= Infostrada TV =

Italian paid-television service

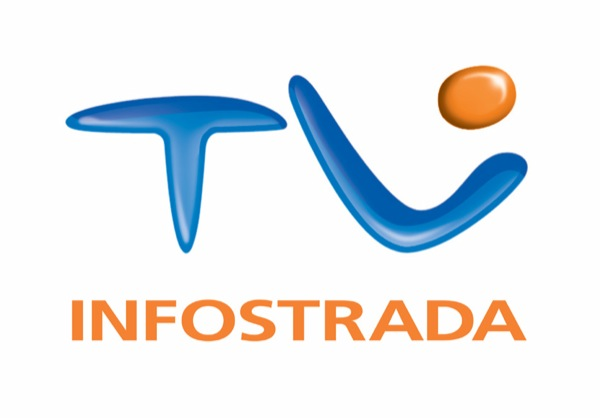
Infostrada TV

Infostrada TV was an Infostrada IPTV service in Italy launched in 2007 by Wind.

It was shut down in June 2012.

== History ==
The service started in December 2007 by Wind employing the Mediaroom technology (at the time owned by Microsoft) as part of Wind's implementation of a triple-play offer. Viewers had access to a 170-channel offer, including DTT channels, foreign channels and subscription packages provided by Sky Italia.

In December 2009, it started offering a package of pay-to-play games from French company Visiware under its Playin' TV service.

== Channel list ==
=== DTT and radio channels ===
- Rai 1
- Rai 2
- Rai 3
- Rai 4
- Rete 4
- Canale 5
- Italia 1
- La7
- Rai Gulp
- MTV Italy
- Sportitalia
- Sportitalia 24
- Boing
- Rai News 24
- DeeJay TV
- Iris
- Coming Soon Television
- Rai Sport Più
- Class News
- Mediashopping
- Rai Storia
- Rai Radio 1
- Rai Radio 2
- Rai Radio 3
- Rai FD4 Leggera
- Rai FD5 Auditorium
- Rai Isoradio

=== Other international channels ===
- EuroNews (in Italian)
- BBC World
- Al Jazeera International
- TV5Monde Europe
- TVE Internacional
- Oasi TV
- Bloomberg Television (in Italian)
- TV Moda
- Sky TG24
- Adult Movie Club
- CNN International
- Das Erste
- ZDF
- RTL
- ProSieben
- Sat.1
- Vox (German TV channel)
- 3sat

Some Sky channels (included the HDTV channels) are available with a separate subscription.

For the end of 2008 is planned the start of the video on demand and pay-per-view service on Infostrada TV with the first channels.
