= Marco Baldini =

Italian television and radio personality (born 1959)

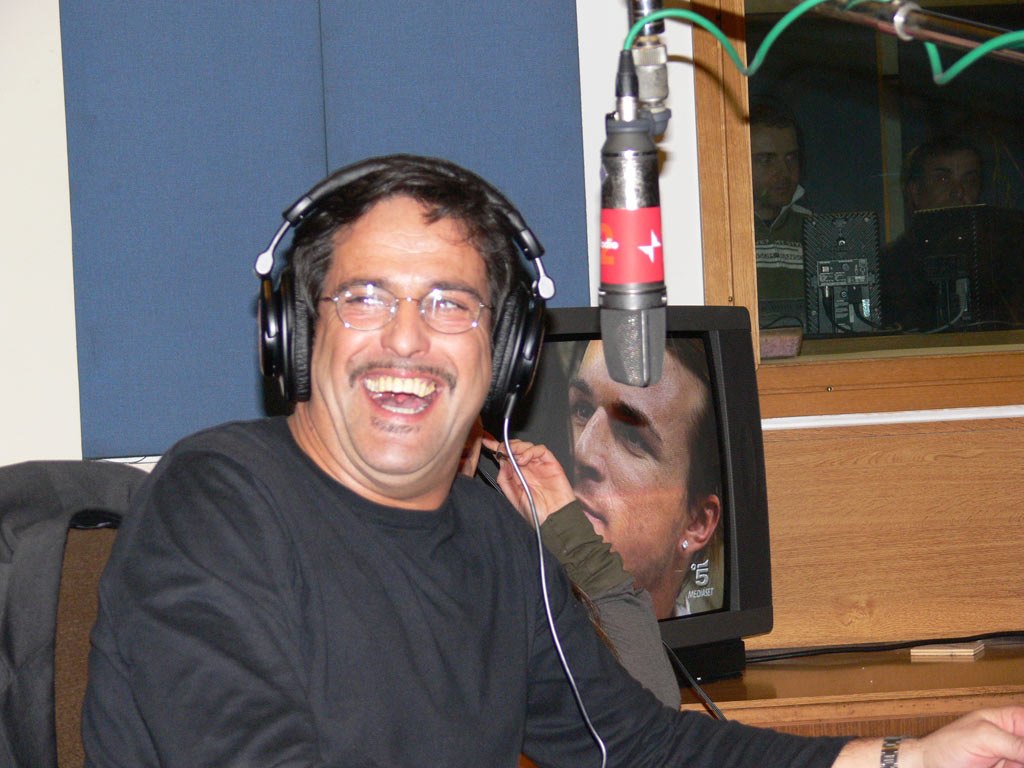
- Born: 3 September 1959 (age 65); Florence, Italy
- Occupations: Italian television personality; radio host
- Spouse: Stefania Lillo (m. 2007; div. 2014)
- Website: http://www.marcobaldo.it

Marco Baldini (born 3 September 1959 in Florence) is an Italian television and radio personality. He is best known for his highly successful partnership with Fiorello on radio and television.

== Biography ==
After starting at age 21 to work for in Tuscan radio with Marco Vigiani, he began broadcasting nationally with Radio Deejay, for which he has produced several programmes (Baldini Ama Laurenti, Tutti per l'una, Baldini's land, Marco Baldo Show). In 1989, Marco first broadcast his show Viva Radio Deejay on the Milanese network with Rosario Fiorello, who provided impressions and characters. In 1987, he hosted the Videomusic programme On the air.

He has had several personal problems. This led him to be dropped from Radio DeeJay, after which he moved for a short time to Italy Radio Network (RIN), where he conducted, along with Fave, Angelo and Max, a programme called Le Fave del Mattino (The Morning Beans). His personal problems continued, and he was also forced to leave his position at the RIN.

Baldini produced the radio version of the television programme "Tonight I'll pay ... Revolution", broadcast on Rai Uno in 2004 and hosted by Fiorello. Baldini managed the radio transmission and interacted with Fiorello in a series of sketches similar to those used in the program Viva Radio2.

In 2007, he participated in the celebrity poker tournament organised by Sky Sports.

In January 2008, he hosted, together with Fiorello, the ten-part minishow Viva Radio Two ... minutes, aired on Rai Uno after the 8 o'clock news.

On 9 March 2013, he returned to Radio Deejay on weekend mornings, with the programme "The Marchino catches the worm", wave from 7.00 to 9.00.

On 21 June 2013, the director of Radio Deejay, Linus, announced on his blog the conclusion of the employment relationship with Baldini, to take place at the beginning of the following month.

=== Political commitment ===
In April 2008, he joined the call for unity by the communists, along with other public figures.

In July 2009, he was one of the promoters of the movement "Left-Communist People".

=== Compulsive gambling ===
Baldini had serious problems related to gambling, being obsessed especially with horse races.
In several interviews, he described his compulsive gambling as a severe pathology which had led him to lose circa 6 million Euros and become a victim of loan sharks (including Casamonica clan), with creditors phoning him up to 60 times a day. Apparently his disease was rooted in a deeper psychological distress.
Baldini stated that many friends of his had lent him some money: among them, Linus (who had helped him with almost €50.000 that were never returned), Fabrizio Frizzi and Giancarlo Magalli.
Baldini also confessed that he had even been on the verge of suicide due to his desperation.
Following his troubles, he hasn't bet on horse races since 2008. Despite that, Baldini said that he was still playing SuperEnalotto, as the main thing to avoid was the desire of winning something back. He also decided to visit schools to tell young people his experience and warn them about the risks gambling entails.
In September 2005 he published his autobiography Il giocatore (ogni scommessa è un debito), Italian for "The player (every bet is a debt)".

=== Private life ===
In September 2007, Marco married the radio host Stefania Lillo, with his friend Fiorello as best man. The couple divorced in 2013.

He considers himself Roman Catholic.

He is a fan of the ACF Fiorentina soccer team.

== Advertising ==
- (2008) – Fiat series of commercials shot in the studio of Viva Radio 2 with his colleague Fiorello
- (2011–2012) – Wind, advertising always Fiorello is where the new "Bello della telefonia"

== Filmography ==
The 2008 comedy-drama movie The Early Bird Catches the Worm, is an adaptation of his autobiography The Player (each bet is debt), with Elio Germano playing Baldini.
