= Rai Vd'A =

Television channel in the Aosta Valley, Italy

- Country: Italy
- Broadcast area: Aosta Valley

Ownership
- Owner: RAI
- Sister channels: Rai 3

Links
- Website: Rai Vd'A

Rai Vd'A (an acronym for Rai Vallée d'Aoste or Rai Valle d'Aosta) is the regional branch of Italy's public broadcaster RAI in the Aosta Valley (French: Siège régional RAI pour la Vallée d'Aoste). It is responsible for producing and broadcasting radio and television programmes in both Italian and French within the region of the Aosta Valley. Some programming is also offered in Valdôtain patois.

== Languages ==
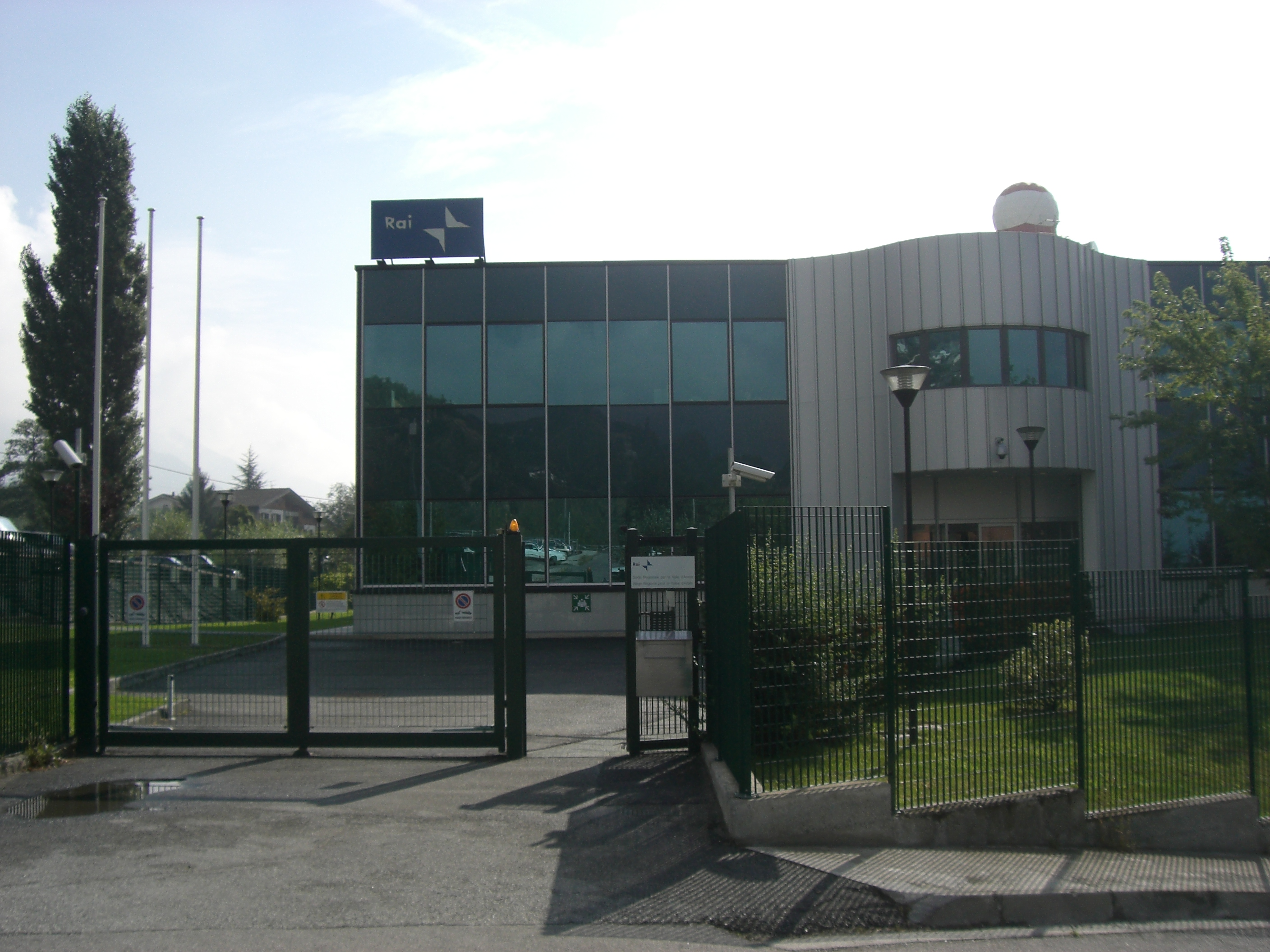
The RAI Vd'A headquarters in Grande-Charrière (Saint-Christophe).

The station is managed and programmed by the RAI Aosta Valley headquarters located in Grande-Charrière, Saint-Christophe. Under the terms of the RAI service contract, the broadcaster is committed to producing radio and television content in minority languages officially recognised by the Italian state. For French in the Aosta Valley, this obligation is fulfilled through Rai Vd'A.

Broadcasts are in Italian and French without subtitles, as both languages are co-official and hold equal status in the region.

Programmes in Valdôtain dialect, a regionally recognised but unofficial language, are always subtitled in Italian and/or French.

== History ==
Rai Vd'A started in the early 1960s as a radio program in French (La Voix de la Vallée), produced in French from Turin, however production from the Aosta Valley began in full in 1968 at Chambéry Street in Aosta, only on radio. On 15 December 1979, its television broadcasts began with the start of Rai's third TV network, which gave airtime for regional programming. The first bulletin was read by Daniele Amedeo, aged 33 at the time,

As of 2009, radio programming was heard in opt-outs on Rai Radio 1 (which had La Voix de la Vallée) and Rai Radio 2. The latter housed Bleu Musique, which it co-produced with Option Musique from Switzerland. For the thirtieth anniversary of television production, Rai Vd'A aired a season of special programs throughout December, with the documentary I fiori all'ochiello, a three-part documentary on its connection with the mountaneering community, reports from the 41st edition of Charaban and special Christmas and New Year's programs.

Rai Vd'A was known since the beginning for pre-empting national radio and television programs. Historically, it pre-empted Jack Folla on Radio 2 and the popular soap opera Un posto al sole on Rai 3. The advent of digital terrestrial television eased some problems, while Rai 3 gained a full simulcast of the national feed on LCN 503. However, in April 2020, it was reported that cultural programs such as Quante Storie and Passato e Presente on LCN 3 were being pre-empted in favor of cartoons dubbed into Valdôtain patois.

== Television programming ==
Rai Vd'A offers general programming with a strong focus on documentaries and news content relating to the Aosta Valley. It airs on Rai 3 exclusively in the Aosta Valley and is streamed online from Monday to Friday from 20:00 to 20:25, and on Sundays from 9:45 to 10:45.

The channel was also formerly broadcast 24/7 in HD on RAI Mux 5.

The schedule includes a variety of Italian- and French-language programming, such as series, in-depth reports, and documentaries exploring the life, culture, and traditions of the Aosta Valley, as well as neighbouring regions like the Canton of Valais (Switzerland) and Auvergne-Rhône-Alpes (France).

== Radio programming ==
Radio content in Italian and French is more extensive than the television offering. On Rai Radio 1, two current affairs programmes air Monday to Friday from 12:35 to 13:00 and from 13:35 to 14:00. On Saturdays, the station broadcasts additional content from 9:35 to 10:30 (in collaboration with Radio Suisse Romande and Radio France), from 12:35 to 13:00, and from 13:25 to 14:00.
