= DeeJay TV =

- Country: Italy
- Broadcast area: Italy

Programming
- Language: Italian
- Picture format: 1080i 16:9 (HDTV)

Ownership
- Owner: GEDI Gruppo Editoriale

History
- Launched: 10 June 2002

Availability

Terrestrial
- Digital: Channel 69

Streaming media
- website: https://www.deejay.it/tv/

DeeJay TV is an Italian music TV channel, opened in 2002 as a music satellite channel, and re-launched in 2009 on digital terrestrial television.

It was bought in 2015 by Discovery Italia, who changed it to a general-entertainment channel and later renamed it to Nove. DeeJay TV reopened in 2018, again on digital terrestrial television.

== History ==
In 2002, a subsidiary of Gruppo Editoriale L'Espresso launched the music channel Deejay TV on satellite. In its first year, the channel delivered its programming entirely free-to-air. In 2003, an agreement with Sky Italia was signed and Deejay TV became a paid channel, available exclusively on the newly-born platform. From 2007, the channel was made available on cable, still paid, on the TV di Fastweb, Alice Home TV and Infostrada TV platforms.

On 19 October 2009, the national network All Music, acquired in 2004 by Gruppo L'Espresso, ceases its own transmissions. From that date, on its slot, music videos and a promo announcing the birth of a new channel aired. On 1 November 2009, the Deejay TV brand becomes detached from the former paid cannel, officially becoming the new name of All Music. The new owner became All Music S.p.A., a company controlled by Gruppo L'Espresso. On Sky, instead, the extant channel kept its programming intact, adopting, however, a new name: MyDeejay.

From 27 February 2012, the channel started broadcasting in 16:9 widescreen, while from 21 April that same year, the channel moves from free-to-air to free-to-view on satellite, using the Tivùsat system.

On 26 November 2010, with the announcement of the new digital terrestrial channel line-up, the Ministry of Economy and Development granted LCN 9 ti Deejay TV, number that was still dependent on negotiations from TAR and the State Council.

The network, which initially was a music channel, started dedicating only a minimal amount of its schedule to music programming from January 2013; only during Deejay chiama Italia and the afternoon program Occupy Deejay it did actually carry music, but most of the time it aired TV series, movies and its own productions. In the same period there was an increase in home shopping programs in the afternoon as "DMC Shop", which with its half-hour length, started taking slots from othe programs.

From early 2014, the channel suffers a severe decadence and risks the closure due to an economic crisis owing to a lack of advertising revenue, as advertised by radio host Linus in an interview.

On 22 January 2015, an agreement between Gruppo Espresso and Discovery Italia was signed for the cession to the latter of All Music S.p.A., the owner of the channel. The takeover took place on 1 February, beginning a transitional phase which culminated on 3 October 2016, becoming Nove.

From 8 January 2018, following the announcement of the acquisition of Elemedia of LCN 69, the channel resumed its activities on the Rete A 1 multiplex with an infocard. The relaunch took place on 14 January 2018 on both digital terrestrial television Sky Italia channel 714 (replacing myDeejay). The channel carries Deejay chiama Italia in simulcast with Radio Deejay (also with evening repeats) as well as music videos, the 30 Songschart and Summer Camp.

On 1 July 2019, it left Sky Italia. On 22 July of the same year, its terrestrial channel became available only in high definition.

On 17 September 2019, the HD icon was added to the channel's logo. It was removed on 22 October 2021.

== See also ==
- Radio DeeJay
