= Cable radio =

Sound content transmitted via signals on coaxial cable

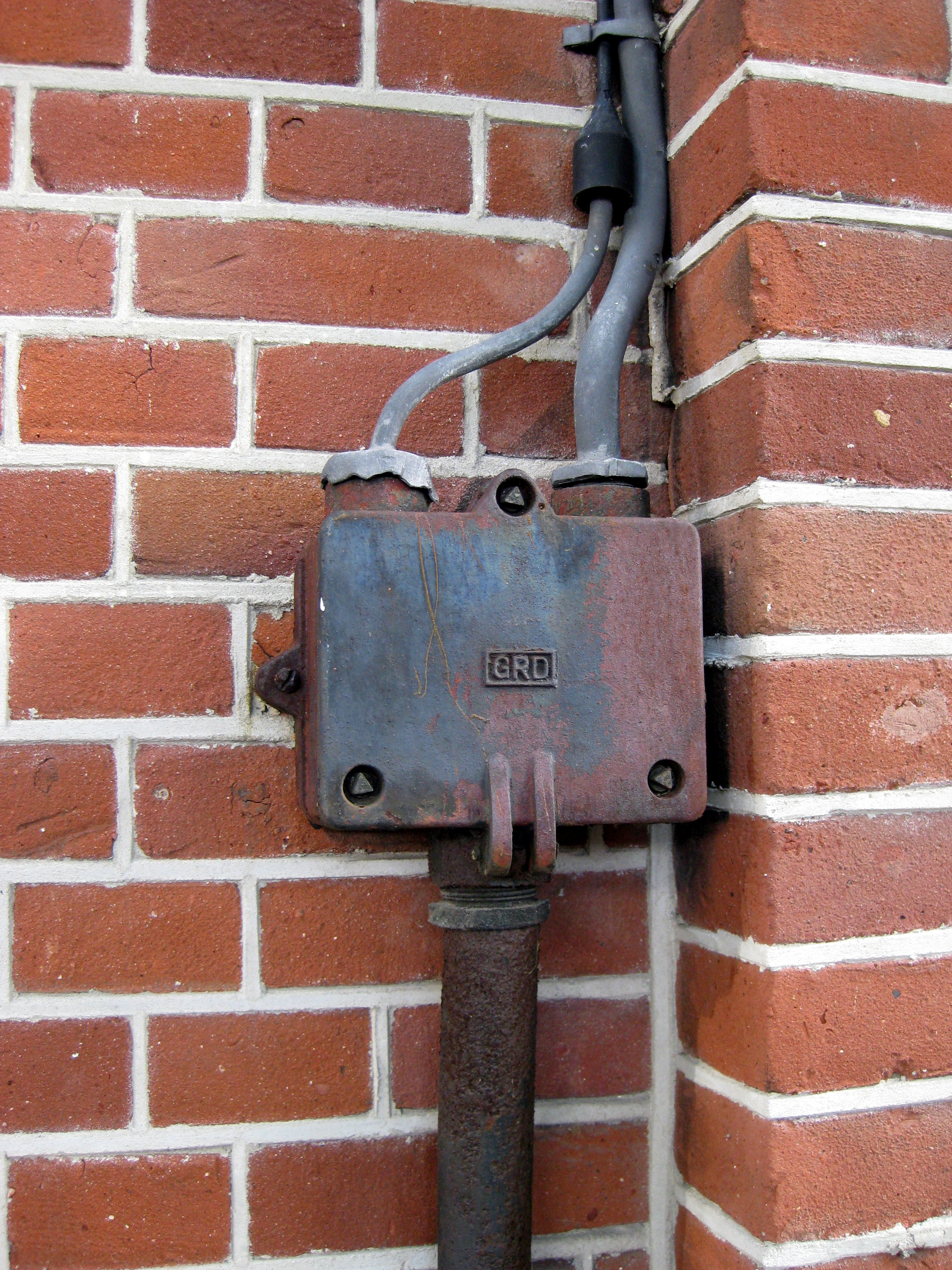
Distributor of the GRD (Communal Radiodistribution Service) in Utrecht, Netherlands, 2010

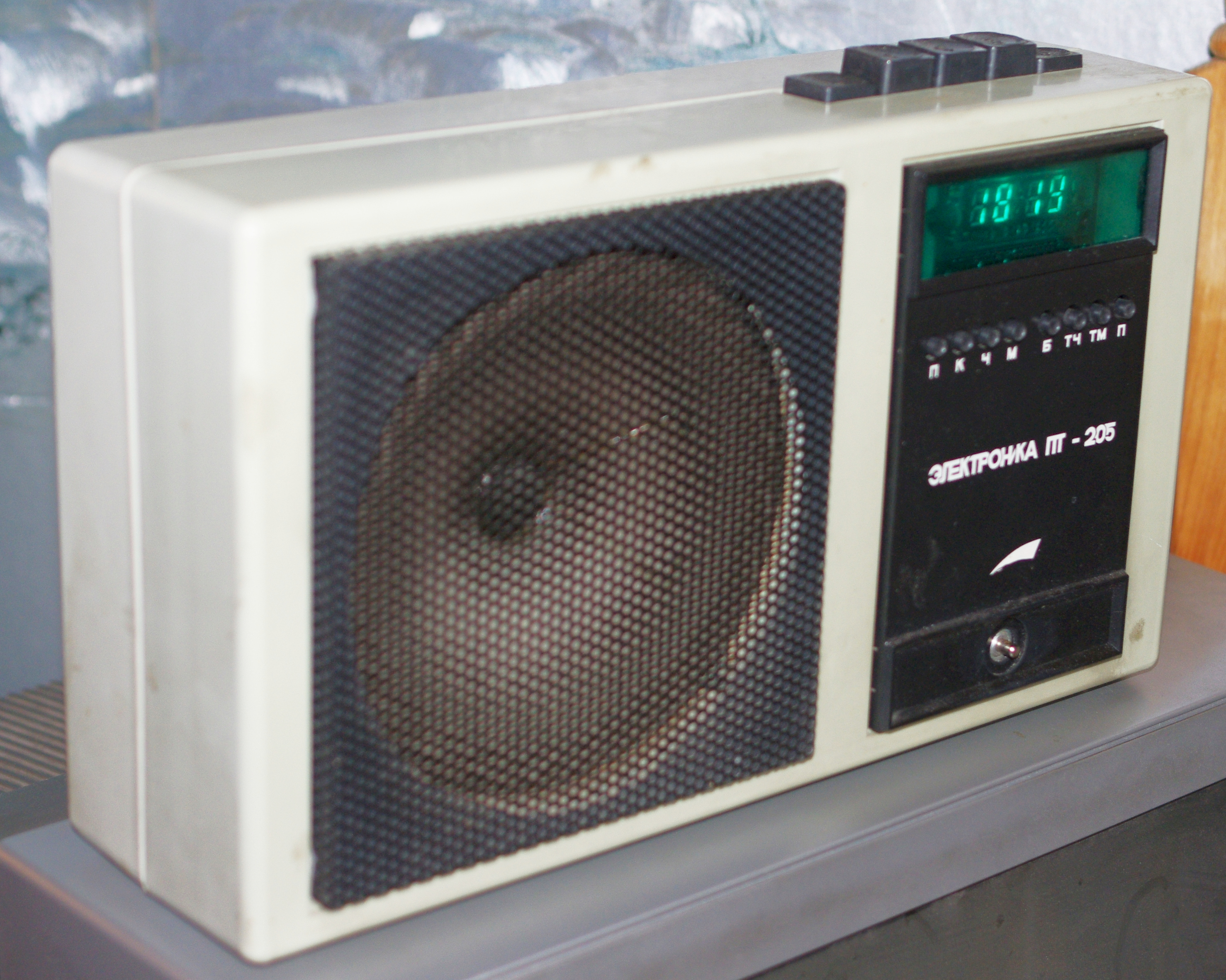
Elektronika russian cable radio

Cable radio is radio broadcasting into homes and businesses via a cable. This can be a coaxial cable used for television, or a telephone line. It is generally used for the same reason as cable TV was in its early days when it was "community antenna television", in order to enhance the quality of over-the-air radio signals that are difficult to receive in an area. However, cable-only radio outlets also exist. It can be both FM or AM.

The use of cable radio varies from area to area – some cable TV systems don't include it at all, and others only have something approaching it on digital cable systems. Additionally, some stations may just transmit audio in the background while a public-access television cable TV channel is operating in between periods of video programming.

From the late 1970s to the late 1980s, before the advent of MTS Stereo television broadcasts, an additional cable decoder was offered to cable TV subscribers, which was connected to the FM antenna terminal of a radio receiver and broadcast audio simulcasts of television broadcasts on certain frequencies, but separately transmitted in FM stereo, along with traditional local radio stations at their specific frequencies, utilizing the cable system's own taller receiving antenna for maximum audio clarity. For instance, MTV's audio would be offered on a cable radio frequency, thus the video being played in monaural sound on cable would have its television audio muted, and the stereo audio instead heard through the radio receiver.

A related secondary meaning of the term is any automated music stream – the usual format of cable-only "stations".

== History ==
The creator of wired radio is considered to be Julian Ochorowicz, a psychologist, philosopher, publicist, and inventor of Polish origin, who distinguished himself in such fields as electrical engineering, television, photography, and chemistry, and invented a double-membrane electromagnetic telephone. In 1880, a loudspeaker of his invention was used in the first voiceover of an opera performance in Paris.

== United States ==
The first "commercial" cable radio station in the United States was CABL-FM 108 in California, on the Theta Cablevision system, serving West Los Angeles and surrounding areas. It went live on January 1, 1972, and was run by Brad Sobel, playing what he called "progressive top 40". CABL-FM 108 came into being after Sobel's original venture, K-POT, a bootleg FM station on 88.1 MHz, was silenced by the Federal Communications Commission (FCC) in November 1971. The illicit station ran for three days until it was shut down, and the event made the front page of the Los Angeles Times and the Los Angeles Herald-Examiner. Because Theta Cablevision charged extra for its FM hookups, CABL-FM 108's potential audience was between 4,700 and approximately 25,000 (based on information provided by Brad Sobel in an article in Billboard), out of Cablevision's approximately 100,000 subscriber households.

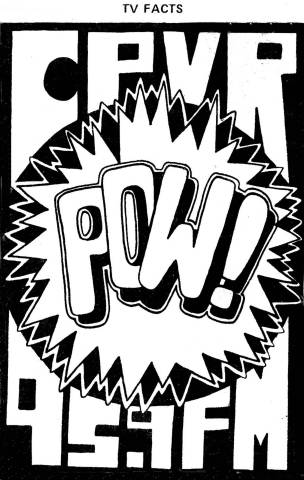
95.9 CPVR-FM ad in the Daily Breeze (November 1973)

The first exclusively cablecasting community radio station was CPVR in Palos Verdes, California, a suburb of Los Angeles. CPVR 95.9 Cable FM radio was on the Times-Mirror cable system, and was started by a group of teenagers who initially practiced being disc jockeys in the homes of two of the founders. Since traditional broadcasting equipment was prohibitively expensive at the time, a young engineer named Tom Hewitt built much of the electronic hardware from scratch.

Mark Speer and Brad Gardner began the venture, which was run as a non-profit youth organization from a studio in the Golden Cove shopping center in Rancho Palos Verdes beginning in March 1972. Even though it was non-profit, it was not subject to the restrictions of terrestrial public radio stations, and thus was able to subsidize expenses by accepting commercial advertising.

Because the staff and audience were part of a highly desirable demographic (many of the DJs weren't even old enough to drive), advertisers of the day, such as concert promoter Pacific Presentations and local record stores eagerly bought ad time in order to reach such a prime demographic (males/females, 13-24) as CPVR had attracted during its history, further enabling CPVR to not only continue operations, but expand into larger studios.

Greg McClure (a.k.a. Isaac O. Zzyzx), Jim Sideris, Harv Laser, David Zislis, Richard Hower, Tony Fasola, Dave Chrenko (a.k.a. Johnny Ace), Kerry Doolin, Liane Benson, Lorraine Dechter, Clyde Stanton (a.k.a. Certified Clyde) and Kathy Bauer were some of the young disc jockeys who helped create the station's legendary style and sound. Unlike Cable 108, CPVR was not only on the FM dial, but was in stereo, and also appeared on the cable system's "barker" channel (Channel 3).

Although the station was only on the "cable" for about two years programming free-form rock and roll, CPVR often scooped its over-the-air competitors, breaking acts such as Bruce Springsteen and Queen, and often premiering landmark albums such as Pink Floyd's The Dark Side of the Moon and Procol Harum's Grand Hotel sometimes several weeks before the Los Angeles stations picked them up.

Many of the original staff went on to careers in media. (Co-founder Brad Gardner has since been nominated for four Emmys, winning two—one for a music video, "The Doctor is In", and the other for the veterinary show Horse Vet. His other two nominations are for directing and audio.) For those involved and those who heard it, this tiny little community rock-and-roll radio station holds a special place in their hearts and minds, often discussed in the same breath as KMET, KPPC, KWST, KRLA, KROQ-FM and KNAC, legendary southern California radio stations in their own right.

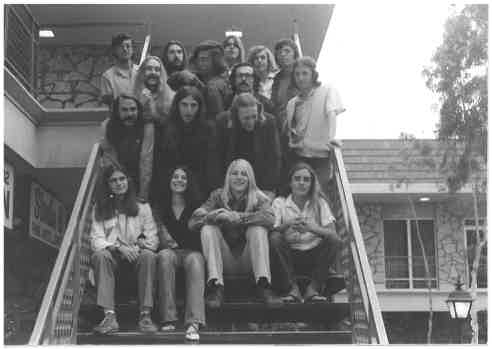
CPVR Staff Photo 1973

For a time, cable radio stations popped up across California and elsewhere in the U.S., most run by high school and/or college students. CCIA, a cable radio station on the campus of California Institute of the Arts, Valencia, California, is one example. But as the founders of these stations grew older and moved on, there was no one to take up where they left off. Eventually all these cable radio stations went dark. Today, where college or community groups might have once considered starting a "cable" radio station, they now look to creating an internet radio station.

On the East Coast the most popular commercial cable radio station was WLHE, started in 1979 in Woburn, Massachusetts. This station was the first commercial cable-only radio station in the country, and ran from 1979 to 1987. Larry Haber, owner and operator, started it. Frank Palazzi and Alan Rupa were the first disc jockeys. Palazzi was known as Frank Fitz, and Alan Rupa was known as Alan James. Mr Haber went by his own name. Other DJs were Jim Fronk (aka Jim Jacobs), oldies expert Chuck Steven, country music expert Glen Evans, indie rock expert Mark Sawyer, and jazz expert Scott Cavanagh (a.k.a. Scott Rogers). Larry Haber was the station’s first president and general manager, Palazzi served as program director, and Rupa was music director. The station was heard only on Continental Cablevision's local Channel 6 in Woburn, Wilmington, Stoneham, North Reading, and Billerica, Massachusetts.

== Canada ==
In Canada, the Canadian Radio-television and Telecommunications Commission previously required most cable companies to provide cable FM service; those that did were required to convert all local AM broadcast radio stations to cable FM signals. The commission now requires only that campus, community, native radio stations, and one CBC Radio station in each official language, be provided by local cable companies, either via cable FM or digital cable audio channels.

== North Korea ==
North Korea has had a cable radio system sometimes referred to as 'Third Broadcast' since the 1940s and it was declared that all cities and villages had been reached by the service in 1975.

Operated by the North Korean Ministry of Communications and focusing on music, news, and educational programs, Third Broadcast has been mandatory in new apartment blocks since the 1980s and is present in some offices and loud speakers posted in public places.

== United Kingdom ==
The earliest cable-only radio stations in the United Kingdom was Radio Thamesmead in Thamesmead, South East London and Radio Swindon Viewpoint in Swindon, Wiltshire. Cable relays of early BBC stations (in areas where direct reception was poor) dates back to the late 1920s.

== Australia ==
The Melbourne suburb of St. Kilda had a landline radio station called 3SA which operated on weekends and public holidays from March 1954 until July 2010.

== Singapore ==
Rediffusion Singapore was a popular cable radio service on the island from 1949-1980's, which broadcast in English and Chinese. It is now a subscription digital radio service, broadcasting on DAB+.

== Malta ==
Rediffusion Malta was a popular cable radio service on the island from 1935-1975, with broadcasts in English and Maltese Language. In 1975 the service was nationalised and it was demised on 31 January 1989. It is now part of Radio Malta

== Italy ==
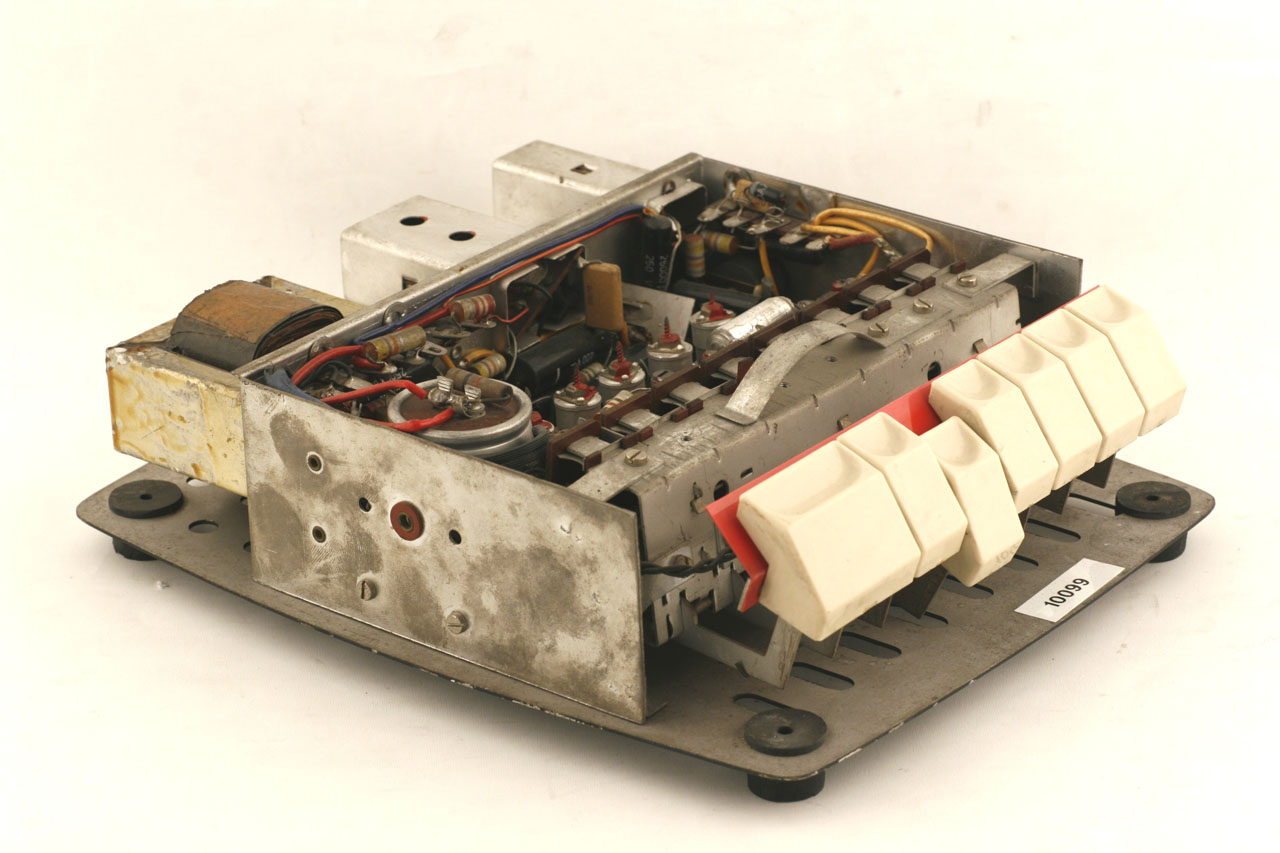
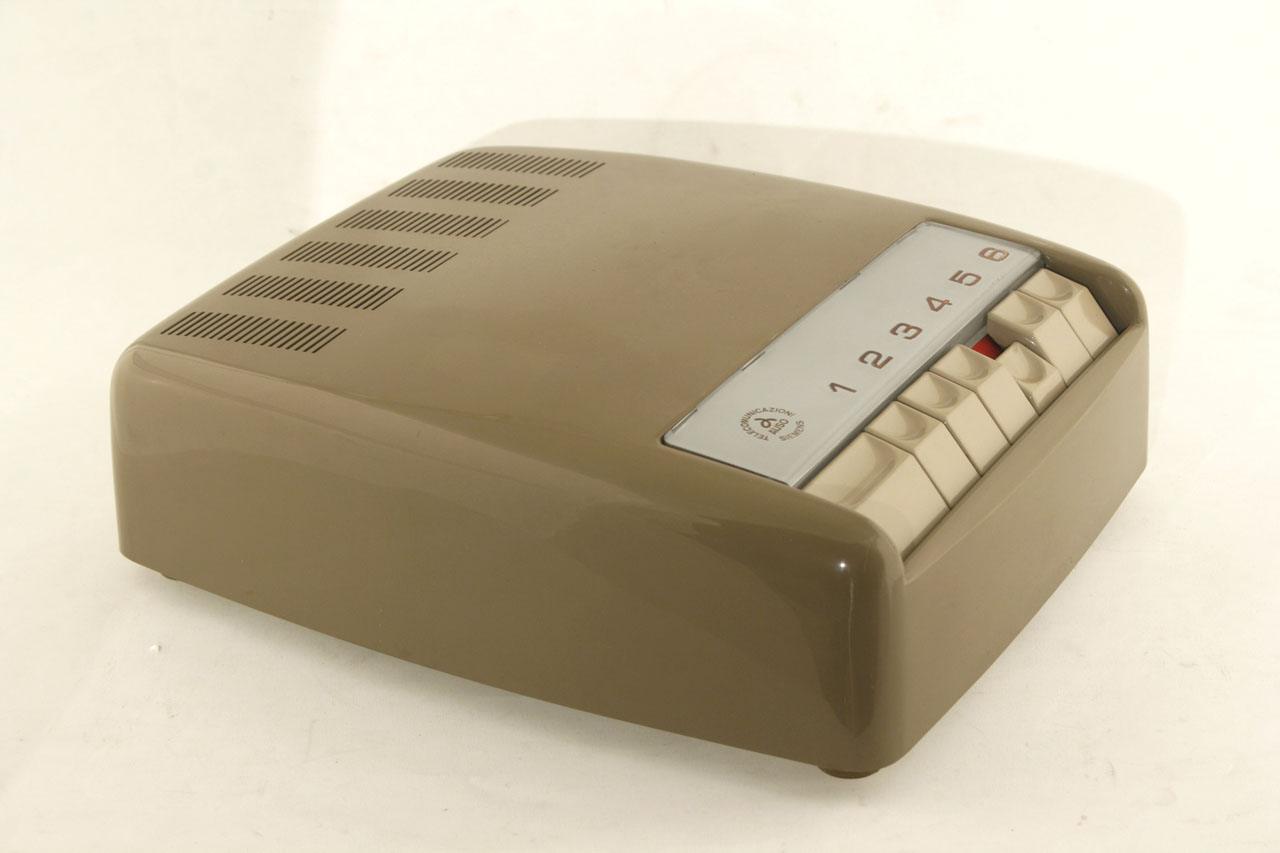
Early Italian cable radio tuner, designed to be plugged into a regular radio's phono input

Italy had cable radio, called Filodiffusione (lit. "wire-broadcasting"), between 1958 and 2023. The service offered six amplitude-modulated longwave channels, 15 kHz wide, with the following center frequencies:

Channel	Frequency
FD1	178 kHz
FD2	211 kHz
FD3	244 kHz
FD4	277 kHz
FD5	310 kHz
FD6	343 kHz

Filodiffusione was available in its coverage areas (approx. 7 km from major exchanges) over SIP's public switched telephone network, for a small additional fee; it was touted as an upgrade over wireless radio thanks to its improved channel bandwidth, interference resistance, and wider choice of programmes. While its popularity sharply declined in the 1970s (with the introduction of frequency-modulated radio and the legalisation of commercial broadcasting) and again in the 2000s (being incompatible with *DSL service), filodiffusione developed a good reputation for the quality of programming, eventually becoming available over the Internet and other digital media.

Though no end of service was formally announced by TIM – with only a passing mention of the intention to discontinue it in 2023 – a listener reported that FD was no longer receivable by February 2023.

== Switzerland ==
The Swiss Telefonrundspruch was introduced in 1931 to supply buildings in alpine valleys – which were difficult to reach with FM/VHF radio stations – with AM radio that was carried over the landline telephone network. From 1956, it offered the following six radio stations:

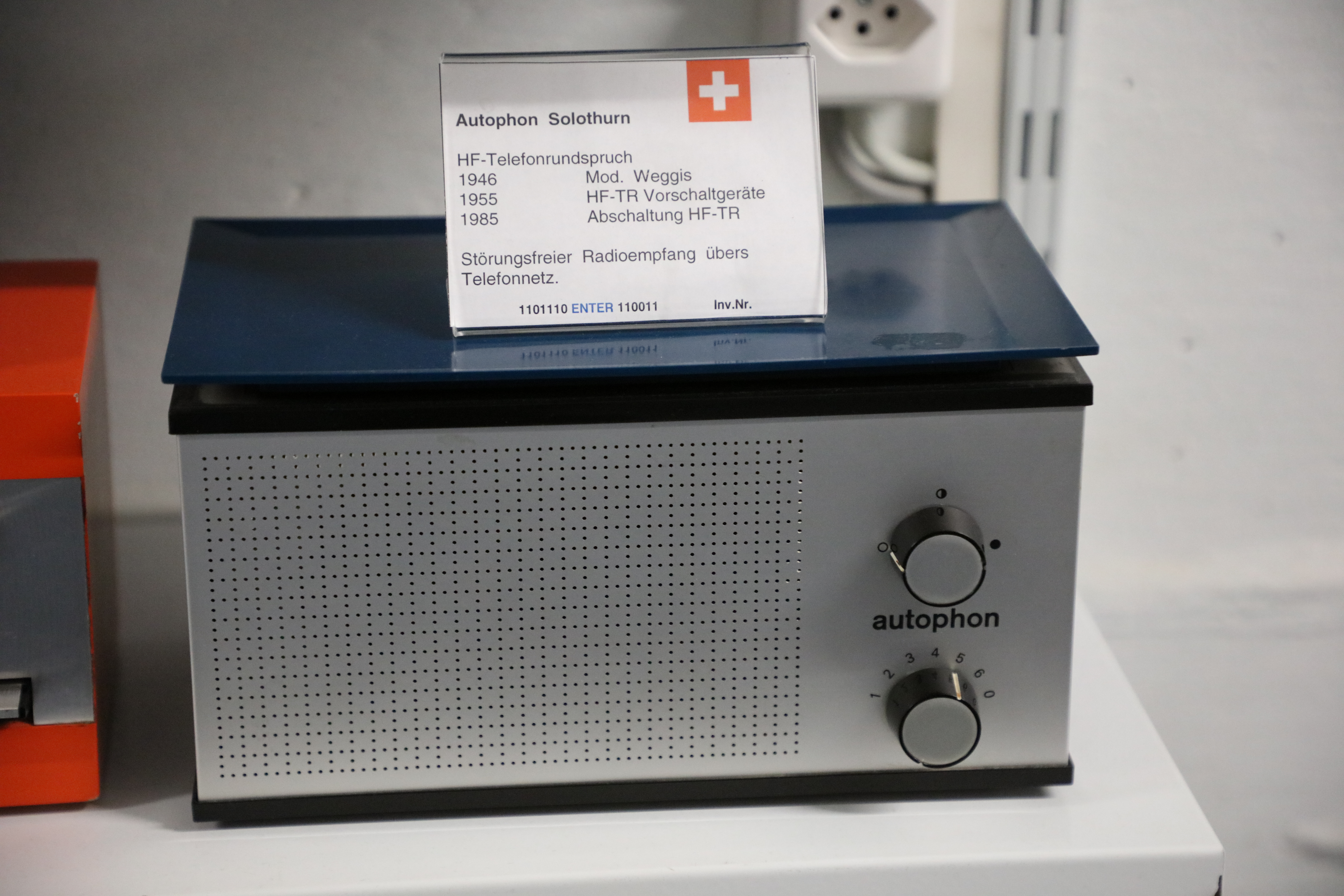
Swiss 'Telefonrundspruch' radio, showing the dials for the volume and the six programs

Channel	Frequency
Swiss Radio International (English)	175 kHz
RSR1 "la première" (French)	208 kHz
Classical music	241 kHz
RSI1 "rete UNO" (Italian)	274 kHz
DRS 1 (German)	307 kHz
Easy music	340 kHz

1940 saw the introduction of the HF-TR variant, which allowed listening to the radio programme while a phone conversation was held. In 1969, Switzerland counted 400,000 Telefonrundspruch radio sets.

In the late 1990s, the Telefonrundspruch service was terminated because it interfered with the digital ISDN and ADSL technologies. FM via cable was discontinued by 2024, freeing up channels for DOCSIS 3.1 services.

There are a few options with a cable TV connection in Switzerland, depending on the operator:

- DAB+ Cable is offered by some operators.
- DVB-C radio
- Streaming for certain channels, via the operator-furnished TV box.

== See also ==
- Linjesender – an AM or baseband audio-based system over powerlines or telephone lines, still used in some parts of the world.
- Théâtrophone – a system for disseminating opera and theatre performances over the public telephone network which predates regular broadcasting.
- Carrier current – a system used in the United States and some other places for very localised distribution of radio programming over electric power cables.
- Satellite radio
- Power line communication
- Music Choice
- CRN Digital Talk Radio Networks
- Galaxie
- Max Trax
- DMX (music)
- Drahtfunk
