= Rosario Fiorello =

Italian comedian (born 1960)

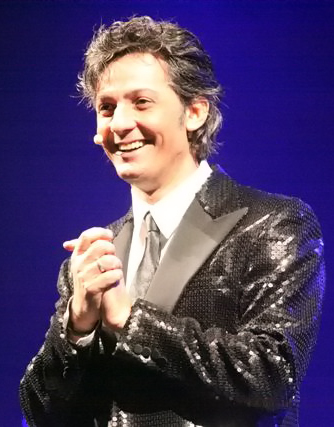
- Fiorello at a stage of his theatre tour in Florence in 2011
- Born: Rosario Tindaro Fiorello; 16 May 1960 (age 66); Catania, Italy
- Occupations: Showman; comedian; television personality; singer; radio personality; television host; actor; musician; producer
- Spouse: Susanna Biondo
- Website: http://www.rosariofiorello.it

Rosario Tindaro Fiorello (born 16 May 1960), known just as Fiorello, is an Italian comedian, singer, radio and television presenter.

== Career ==
Fiorello was born in Catania, Sicily, and raised in Augusta, Sicily. He began his career working in tourist villages, first as a barman, and then as an entertainer. Near the end of the 1980s, Fiorello was brought to Milan by Bernardo Cherubini, whom he had met in Valtur Villages. Bernardo, brother of Jovanotti, who introduced him to Claudio Cecchetto, who directed Radio Deejay and where he met Antonio Germinario, a talent-scout, that become his manager for many years. Soon afterwards, Fiorello began hosting the show "Viva Radio Deejay" with Marco Baldini.

Having become popular through the TV show Karaoke, Fiorello went on to host various TV shows. Soon after, he endured a period of drug problems that kept him away from the world of TV. However, he returned to show business and television in the 1990s, displaying great abilities as a showman, first in the Mediaset networks, then with RAI in 2001, 2002, and 2004 with Stasera Pago Io.

Since 2002, Fiorello has hosted the radio broadcast Viva Radio 2 together with Marco Baldini and the musician Enrico Cremonesi, during which Fiorello shows off his skills as a singer, mimic and entertainer. The authors of the program were Rosario Fiorello with Marco Baldini, Francesco Bozzi, Alberto De Risio, Riccardo Cassini and Federico Taddia. In the summer of 2003, was published the 1st of a long series of CD's that collected the best of his radio show. The CD's included the imitation of: Mike Bongiorno and the Forgetful of Cologno (Berlusconi), Andrea Camilleri, Antonio Cassano, Carlo Azeglio Ciampi, Gianni Minà, Franco Califano, Carla Bruni, Oliviero Toscani, Marina Flaibani from Onda Verde, Nanni Moretti, Vittorio Cecchi Gori, Ignazio La Russa, the prince Albert of Monaco, Monica Bellucci and her husband Vincent Cassel and many more. In 2007 Fiorello and Baldini realized the single Chi Siamo Noi, that included many gags of their radio show Viva Radio 2, the song was written by Rosario Fiorello, Corrado Rizza, Domenico Scuteri and Luca Leonori and it was in the Italian pop chart.

Fiorello's skills as a vocalist have brought him to the cinema as well. He has participated in such varied roles as: a dubber in cartoons (most recently Garfield), to an appearance in the film The Talented Mr. Ripley, in the role of Fausto, a young Italian friend of the main characters.

His younger brother Giuseppe Fiorello is an actor.

In 2008 came out the compilation "Pronto c'e’ Mike" with his gags on the phone with Mike Bongiorno during the radio show "Viva Radio 2", with a book written by Aldo Grasso. On 14 November 2011 Fiorello back on television with a new program entitled "Il più grande spettacolo dopo il weekend" (inspired by the song "Il più grande spettacolo dopo il Big Bang" of his friend Lorenzo Jovanotti). The first episode showed excellent results, with 10 million viewers and almost 40% share. The data, already outstanding, to further improve in the second episode (with over 12 million viewers and a share of almost 43% [10]) and third (almost 12 million viewers and over 43% share).

== Impressions and characters ==
Fiorello's most famous imitations include Mike Bongiorno, and that of Silvio Berlusconi as a character called Smemorato di Cologno who, in the parody, loses his memory every time something related to communism is mentioned. Smemorato di Cologno is a pun on the main character of the Italian comedy Lo smemorato di Collegno, Cologno being instead the headquarters of Berlusconi's well-known media company. Other famous impressions and characters include:

- Albert II, Prince of Monaco
- Andrea Camilleri, an Italian writer
- The Signorina buonasera, a RAI announcer
- Antonio Cassano, an Italian Football player
- Avvocato Messina, a lawyer who defends his clients with absurd pleas
- Barbara Palombelli, an Italian journalist
- Bruno Vespa, an Italian journalist
- Carla Bruni
- Carlo Azeglio Ciampi, former President
- Federico Moccia, an Italian writer
- Franco Battiato, an Italian singer/songwriter
- Franco Califano, an Italian singer/songwriter
- Gianni Minà, an Italian journalist
- Gianni Morandi, an Italian singer
- Giorgio Napolitano, current President
- Giovanni Muciaccia, the presenter of the TV program Art Attack
- Giulietto e Romeo, two gay truck drivers
- Kim Jong-il
- Kimi Räikkönen
- Ignazio La Russa, an Italian politician
- Luciano Pavarotti, Italian Operatic Tenor
- Maurizio Costanzo
- Marco Carta, an Italian singer who won the Sanremo Music Festival in 2009
- Marina Flaibani of the radio program Onda Verde
- Martano Volpi, a mad man from Tuscany
- Monica Bellucci
- The "mostroinviato" (monster-correspondent), which in Italian sounds like "nostro inviato" (our correspondent)
- Nanni Moretti, an Italian director and actor
- Oliviero Toscani, an Italian photographer
- Paolo Fava, an imaginary jazz player
- Padre Georg, Benedetto XVI's secretary
- Recep Tayyip Erdoğan
- The hunchback of Notre Dame, a character of Riccardo Cocciante's musical
- The tenor Roberto Alagna
- Roberto Cavalli
- Romano Prodi, former Prime Minister
- Silvio Berlusconi
- Silvio Muccino as Sasha
- Tony Sperandeo, an Italian character actor famous for his stereotypical gangster roles
- Umberto Eco
- Valerio Staffelli, a journalist from the TV program Striscia la notizia
- Vincent Cassel
- Vittorio Cecchi Gori
- Vladimir Putin

During 16 May 2006 episode, on Fiorello's birthday, Carlo Azeglio Ciampi called to wish him a happy birthday and to congratulate him for his impression, especially for the fact that Ciampi doesn't always pronounce clearly the last syllable of some words.

During November 2006 the newspaper Avvenire (linked with CEI) criticized Fiorello for his impression of Padre Georg. Most of the journalists admitted that they had never listened to the radio program directly.

== Discography ==
=== Singles ===
- La canzone del sole (1991)
- Azzurro (1991)
- Una carezza in un pugno (1992)
- Si o No (Please don't go) (1993)
- Spiagge (1993)
- Puoi (1993)
- Mare Nostrum (1993)
- Finalmente tu (1995)
- Ridi (1995)
- Dimmi dimmi perché (1998)
- Vivere a colori (1998)
- Città vuota (2004)
- L'appuntamento (2005)

=== Album ===
- Veramente falso (1991)
- Nuovamente falso (1992)
- Spiagge e lune (1993)
- Karaoke Compilation (1993)
- Finalmente tu (1995)
- Saro Fiorello (1996)
- Dai miei amici cantautori (1997)
- Batticuore (1998)
- I miei amici cantautori (2000)
- Fiorello the Greatest (2002)
- A modo mio (2004)

=== Duets ===
- With Caterina: "Il cielo – Favola semplice", (1994)
- With 360 Gradi: "E poi... non ti ho vista più" 2003
- With Marco Baldini: "Chi siamo noi" (from Chi siamo noi – Gli inediti di Viva Radio 2) 2007
- With Giorgia: "Più" (from Spirito libero - Viaggi di voce 1992-2008) 2008
- With Claudio Baglioni: "Porta Portese" (from QPGA) 2009
- With Max Pezzali: "Sei un mito" (from Max 20) 2013
- With Mina: "Baby, It's Cold Outside" (from Christmas Song Book 2013
- With Matteo Brancaleoni and Fabrizio Bosso: "L'italiano" (from the album Made in Italy) 2015
- With Danti: "Fatti mandare dalla mamma" 2017

=== Compilation ===
- Uno è famoso, l'altro no: il meglio di Viva Radio2 CD + LIBRO (2002)
- Viva Radio 2 (il meglio del 2003) (2003)
- Viva Radio 2 (il meglio del 2005) (2005)
- Viva Radio Deejay - Il meglio di... (2006)
- Viva Radio 2 (il meglio del 2006) (2006)
- Fiorello e Baldini visti da dietro (2006) – DVD –
- Viva Radio 2 (il meglio del 2007) (2007)
- Chi Siamo Noi (Gli inediti di Viva Radio 2) (2007)
- Pronto c'è Mike: Telefonate al "vero" Mike Bongiorno con libro di Aldo Grasso (2008)
- Viva Radio 2 (il meglio del 2008) (2008)

== Filmography ==
=== Films ===
Year	Title	Role	Notes
1997	Anastasia	Dimitri (voice)	Italian voice-over role
1998	Cartoni animati	Salvatore	
1999	The Talented Mr. Ripley	Fausto	
2002	Johan Padan a la descoverta de le Americhe	Johan Padan (voice)	Italian voice-over role
2004	Garfield: The Movie	Garfield (voice)	Italian voice-over role
2004	Natale a casa Deejay	Wagon's man	
2005	March of the Penguins	Narrator (voice)	Italian voice-over role
2006	Garfield: A Tail of Two Kitties	Garfield/Prince (voice)	Italian voice-over role
2007	Manual of Love 2	Nurse	Cameo appearance
2010	Passione	Himself	Documentary film
2011	Domani	None	Short film; producer
2014	Strani ritmi	Himself	Documentary film
2017	Chi m'ha visto	None	Producer

=== Television ===
Year	Title	Role	Notes
1989–1990	Deejay Beach	Himself/co-host	Musical program
1989–1990	Deejay Television	Himself/co-host	Musical program
1992–1994	Karaoke	Himself/host	Musical program (seasons 1–2)
1993, 1998–2000	Festivalbar	Himself/host	Annual music festival
1995	Don't Forget Your Toothbrush	Himself/host	Game show (season 1)
1996	La febbre del venedì sera	Himself/host	Variety/musical show
1996	Un disco per l'estate 1996	Himself/host	Annual music festival
1996–1997	Buona Domenica	Himself/co-host	Variety show (season 9)
1998	Dio vede e provvede	Rosario	Episode: "Sogni proibiti"
1998–1999	Superboll	Himself/host	Game show
2001–2004	Stasera pago io	Himself/host	Variety show
2008	Romanzo criminale - La serie	Franco Califano	Episode: "Episodio 7"
2011	Il più grande spettacolo dopo il Week End	Himself/host	Variety show
2011–2017	Edicola fiore	Himself/host	Comedy show
2020–2021	Sanremo Music Festival 2020 and Sanremo Music Festival 2021	Himself/co-host	Annual music festival
2022–2023	Sanremo Music Festival 2022 and Sanremo Music Festival 2023	Himself/guest	Annual music festival
2022–present	Viva Rai 2!	Himself/host	Variety show
2023	A casa tutti bene: La serie	Himself	Episode: "Episodio 6"
2023	Raffa	Himself	Docuseries
2024	Sanremo Music Festival 2024	Himself/co-host	Annual music festival

== See also ==
- Viva Radio 2
