= Rai Sport 2 =

- Country: Italy
- Broadcast area: Italy

Programming
- Language: Italian
- Picture format: 576i (SDTV) 16:9

Ownership
- Owner: RAI
- Sister channels: Rai Sport 1

History
- Launched: 18 May 2010
- Closed: 5 February 2017

Availability

Terrestrial
- Digital: LCN 58, Where available

Rai Sport 2 was an Italian sports TV channel, launched on 18 May 2010 by the state-owned RAI television network. It broadcast Italian and international sports events in Italy on DTT channel 58 on Mux Rai 2. It was also available on Sky Italia and on IPTV. The channel was discontinued in February 2017 as RAI consolidated their sports under one network channel combining RAI Sports 1 and RAI Sports 2 into the now RAI Sports + HD.

== Programming ==
When the channel was not broadcasting events, it transmitted the same programming of Rai Sport 1 delayed an hour, including the daily editions of the Tg Sport.

A few programmes include:

- Tour de France
- Milan–San Remo
- Paris–Nice
- Tirreno–Adriatico
- Giro di Sardegna
- Giro del Trentino
- Settimana internazionale di Coppi e Bartali
- Tour of the Basque Country
- Three Days of De Panne
- Tour of Flanders
- Brabantse Pijl
- UCI Road World Championships
