= Rai Isoradio =

- Italy
- Broadcast area: Italy – FM/Some Areas DAB, Hotbird satellite & Internet

Programming
- Format: Highway advisory radio

Ownership
- Owner: RAI
- Sister stations: Rai Radio 1, Rai Radio 2, Rai Radio 3, Rai Radio Tutta Italiana, Rai Radio 3 Classica

History
- First air date: 23 December 1989; 36 years ago

Links
- Webcast: Real Media
- Website: http://www.isoradio.rai.it/

Rai Isoradio is an Italian highway advisory radio service devoted to delivering updated traffic reports (known as Onda Verde) and weather reports provided by Aeronautica Militare, public service announcements by various governmental and public organisations, railways information from Ferrovie dello Stato, news bulletins from GR1, TG1 and TG3, and music.

In collaboration with Autostrade per l'Italia and Autostrada dei Fiori, Rai Isoradio covers all Italian highways (mostly on 103.3 MHz). During nighttime hours (0:30-5:30, known as Isonotte), the network also carries nonstop independent Italian music (interrupted by traffic information every 30 minutes).

== See also ==
- Rai
