= Rai Utile =

Italian TV channel

- Country: Italy
- Broadcast area: Italy

Programming
- Language: Italian

Ownership
- Owner: RAI

History
- Launched: 4 January 2004
- Closed: 1 January 2008
- Former names: Rai Festival/Rai Azzurri/Rai Olimpia

Links
- Website: http://www.raiutile.rai.it/

Rai Utile was an Italian TV channel devoted to Italian government and administration, owned by RAI and launched in 2004.

Has shared its frequencies to Rai Festival during the Festival della canzone italiana in April 2004, to Rai Azzurri during the UEFA Euro 2004 (from 11 June 2004) and to Rai Olimpia during the 2004 Summer Olympics.

Due to a reorganisation, it was closed down in 2008 and replaced temporarily by Rai Gulp and later by Rai 4.

== Pop-up channels ==
=== Rai Festival ===
Rai Festival operated on its frequencies during the week of the Sanremo Music Festival 2004.

=== Rai Azzurri ===
On 12 June 2004, following the Sanremo experiment, it was used to carry Rai Azzurri, a channel dedicated to the goings on of the national football team during UEFA Euro 2004. Among its fixed hosts during the period was Fabrizio Rocca. Newspaper L'Unità criticized the format, as it temporarily replaced a public utility channel, and sarcastically suggested it to be renamed as Rai Ossimoro (Rai Oxymoron).
