= Rai Teche =

Archive of Rai material

- Founded: 1995
- Headquarters: Rome
- Area served: Italy
- Parent: RAI

Rai Teche is a company that manages all archived material that has been produced and broadcast by Italian national public broadcaster RAI throughout its history.

== History ==
The company, originally called Teche e servizi tematici/educativi RAI, was formed in 1995 to categorise and preserve all materials documenting the history of Italian television from over 20 different channels.

In 1999, the old databases were merged and a multimedia catalogue of all broadcasts from the three main channels was published online, along with more than 300,000 hours of historical TV material, prior to the launch of the online radio station in 2000.

Thematic channels were also introduced on digital terrestrial television, with access to the catalogue being limited to those within the company. The content consists of all aired material, including that to which Rai Teche does not have the rights. In February 2014, Rai’s board of directors authorised high-quality digitisation of the historical archives.

In 2004, Rai Teche and Rai Libri published a 500-page large-format volume titled RicordeRai celebrating 50 years of Italian TV broadcasting. With RAI ERI, it published a line of books dedicated to the revival of L'Approdo, a radio show broadcast from the Rai phonology studio in Milan, and another broadcast titled Chiamate Roma 3131. The first issues of Radiorario and an analytical book about TV quiz games were also included in the series. Rai Teche made a considerable contribution of material to the exhibition 1924–2014 la Rai racconta l'Italia, which opened on 31 January 2014 inside Rome's Vittoriano.

As a result of a planned anticipated retired of Rai directors, Barbara Scaramucci was temporarily replaced by the general director Luigi Gubitosi in March 2014. After four months, the board of directors appointed Maria Pia Ammirati as the new director of Rai Teche.

== Consultation ==
The full catalogue can be accessed by citizens in the library located in Viale Mazzini in Rome, in the Bibliomediateca Rai at the Rai Teche production centre in Turin, and in all of Rai's regional offices. In collaboration with the Italian Ministry of Cultural Heritage and Activities, 4 terminals have been installed in the Mediateca Braidense of Milan, located within the former church of Saint Teresa, in the Discoteca di Stato, and in the library of the Accademia Nazionale di Santa Cecilia in Rome. Since June 2018, two terminals are available in the Biblioteca universitaria di Pavia.

Customers requiring material for non-profit events or celebrations are able to make requests to Teche customer service, located in Rome. The material is also sold by Rai itself.

Teche's website does not show the complete catalogue of the archives, but only information on how to access them, as well as chronologies of TV programs and a selection of audio and video clips which recreate the history of Italian radio and TV. The website includes a complete collection of Radiocorriere TV from 1925 to 1995, and a collection by the magazine L'Approdo letterario.

The material is featured on Rai Storia and is used by many thematic channels and companies websites via Rai's generalist channels. Programs based on archives like Techetechetè (aired since 2012), also use the content, as well as the web radio station Radio Techetè.

== Bibliography ==
- Scaramucci, Barbara; Ferretti, Claudio (2003). RicordeRai: 1924/1954/2004. Rome: Rai Eri. ISBN 8839712747. OCLC 799508245.
- Millecanali (supplement to), La storia della radio e della televisione, Cinisello Balsamo, Gruppo Editoriale JCE, 2004.
- Scaramucci, Barbara; Del Pino, Guido (2006). Come si documenta la TV. Rome: Rai Eri. ISBN 8839713964. OCLC 80746113.
- Porcelli, Filippo (2007). Schegge: La TV dopo la TV. Il Saggiatore. OCLC 144614574.
