= Television licensing in Italy =

Overview of the television licensing system of Italy

All owners of television equipment or any other equipment able or adaptable so to receive television are required by Italian law to have a television licence. The licence, colloquially known as canone Rai, is used to part-fund the Italian public service broadcaster Rai. The licence fee was introduced for owners of radio sets in 1923, and is currently governed by a law which dates back to 1938. The annual cost of the licence fee is around €100 once VAT (IVA) is accounted for.

Unlike television licensing in the United Kingdom, there is no exception for those who only use a TV to receive non-broadcast signals such as playing DVDs or watching online videos.

However, if the TV is physically unable to receive any broadcast signals (usually through removing the tuner or having the antenna input sealed through an operation called Sigillatura), no set-top boxes are used to receive broadcasts and only using home media or IPTV, an exemption form may be filed every year to gain a one-year exemption from the tax.

From January 2016 all Italian electricity bills will carry a monthly surcharge which will be the equivalent of one tenth of the annual TV licence fee.

== Cost of the licence fee over time ==
The following table shows the cost of the licence fee excluding the base rate and valued-added tax.

Year	Black & White TV	Color TV
1981	L. 36,320	L. 66,930
1988	L. 88,740	L. 108,770
1990	L. 113,700	L. 114,680
1991		L. 131,140
1992		L. 137,730
1998		L. 156,150
1999		L. 160,530
2000		L. 164,860
2001		L. 167,360
2002		€ 87.76
2003		€ 91
2004		€ 93.46
2007		€ 97.76
2008		€ 98.72
2024		€ 70.00

== Abrogation Proposal ==
On 5 January 2018, Italian former Prime Minister Matteo Renzi proposed to abolish the Rai licensing fee.
