= Rai Way =

Rai Way S.p.A.

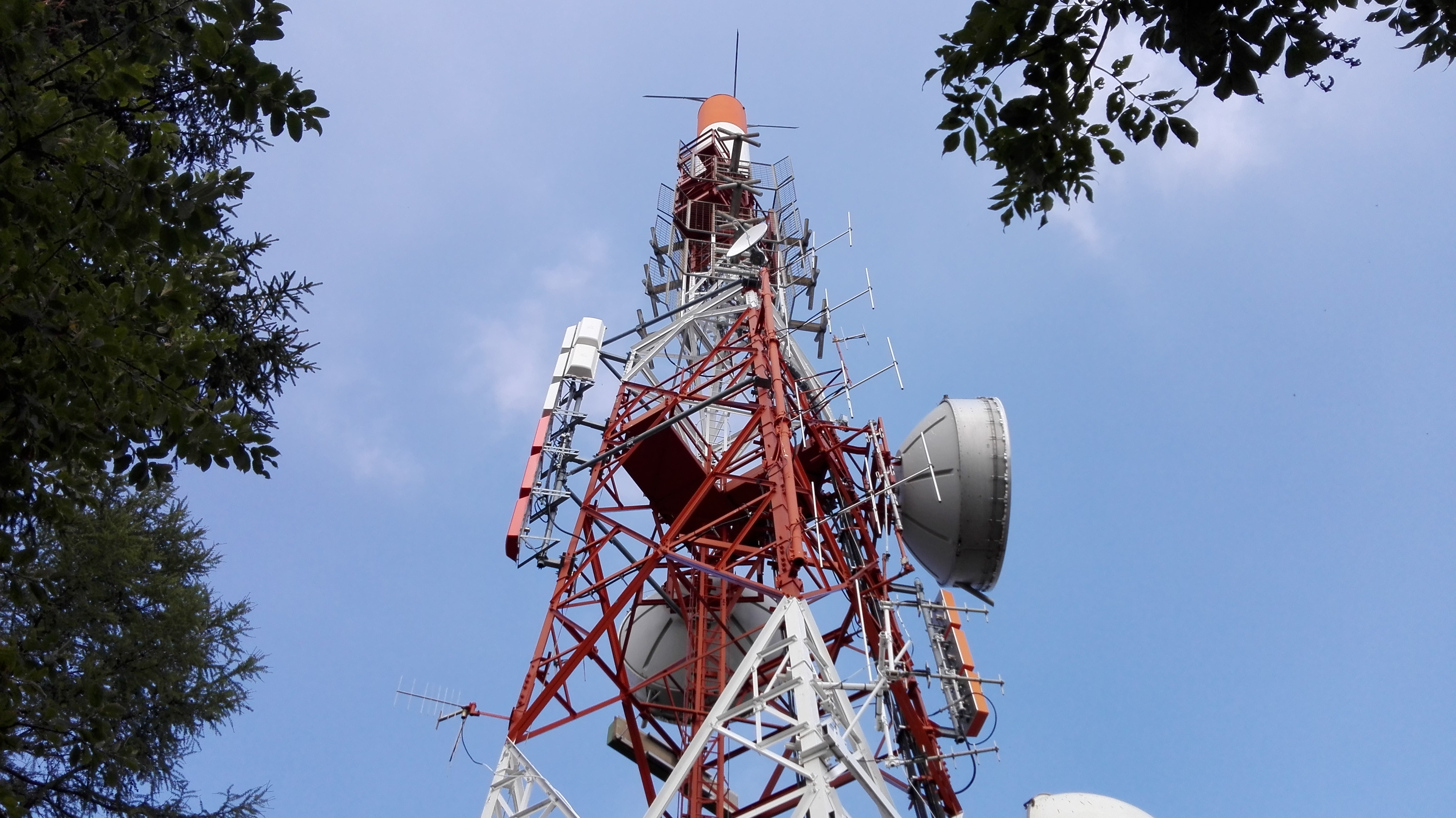
- Rai Way transmitter station located on Punta di Mezzo
- Company type: Public
- Traded as: BIT: RWAY; FTSE Italia Mid Cap
- Founded: 29 July 1999
- Headquarters: 66 via Teulada, Rome, Italy
- Net income: ▲€24,645,775 (2014)
- Total assets: ▲€335,117,552 (2014)
- Total equity: ▲€153,790,400 (2014)
- Owner: RAI (65.073%); BlackRock (5.184%)
- Parent: RAI
- Website: Official website

Rai Way is an Italian listed company that owns the broadcasting infrastructure of state-owned RAI TV station. Its shares are traded into the FTSE Italia Mid Cap Index.

In 2015, EI Towers launched a hostile takeover bid for €1.2 billion; however, Italian law required RAI to hold at least 51% shares of the company.
