= Rai Futura =

- Country: Italy
- Broadcast area: Italy

Programming
- Language: Italian
- Picture format: 576i (SDTV)

Ownership
- Owner: Rai

History
- Launched: May 30, 2005
- Closed: June 1, 2007
- Replaced by: Rai Gulp
- Former names: Futura TV (2005)

Links
- Website: www.futuratv.rai.it

Rai Futura was an Italian entertainment TV channel owned by RAI and launched May 30, 2005 on timeshares with Rai Doc.

== Scheduling ==
Its programmes were dedicated to cinema, music, video games, comic books and television, politics, and books.

- L33T
- Larsen
- Tàbu Show
- Look at You
- Taglia e Cuci

== Personalities ==
From May 30, 2005, to December 26, 2006:

- Daniela Arpino
- Mario Bellina
- Michele Bertocchi
- Livio Beshir
- Luana Bisconti
- Matteo Bisi
- Giulia Blasi
- Giuseppe Carlotti
- Alessandro De Angelis
- Paola Farina
- Adriana Fonzi Cruciani
- Pietro Franzetti
- Enrico Fusai
- Chiara Giallonardo
- Maria Iodice
- Lodovica Mairé Rogati
- Barbara Matera
- Andrea Materia
- Cesare Rascel
- Costanza Melani
- Chiara Michelini
- Federica Peluffo
- Edoardo Pesce
- Francesca Romana Ronchi
- Denise Santoro
- Maria Novella Tei
- Roberta Paris
- Andrea D'Agostini

== Closing ==
Rai Future was closed on June 1, 2007 with Rai Doc, due to decision of RAI, and replaced by Rai Gulp on the same frequencies.
