= Viva Radio 2 =

- Genre: Comedy / Entertainment
- Running time: 110 minutes
- Country of origin: Italy
- Language(s): Italian
- Home station: Rai Radio 2
- TV adaptations: Rai Uno/Raisat Extra
- Starring: Rosario Fiorello - Marco Baldini
- Written by: Rosario Fiorello - Marco Baldini - Francesco Bozzi - Riccardo Cassini- Alberto Di Risio - Federico Taddia
- Directed by: Marco Lolli
- Produced by: Marina Mancini
- Website: http://vivaradio2.rai.it/

Viva Radio 2, an Italian radio program, aired from 2001 to 2008 on Rai Radio 2.

== Content ==
The show was based on Fiorello's imitations. Described by one critic as consisting of "amusing chat, satire, and impersonations", it was co-hosted with DJ Marco Baldini and music director Enrico Cremonesi. The show was written by Rosario Fiorello, Marco Baldini, Riccardo Cassini, Alberto Di Risio, Francesco Bozzi, and Federico Taddia.

== Partial list of imitated characters ==
- Roberto Alagna
- Kimi Räikkönen
- prince Albert of Monaco
- Francesco Amadori
- Franco Battiato
- Silvio Berlusconi (always called Cologno's forgetful)
- Tony Blair, English prime minister
- Mike Bongiorno
- Carla Bruni
- Franco Califano
- Andrea Camilleri, author
- Marco Carta
- Antonio Cassano
- Vincent Cassel
- Roberto Cavalli
- Carlo Azeglio Ciampi, former president
- Giuseppe Ciarrapico
- Riccardo Cocciante
- Maurizio Costanzo, TV host
- Pino Daniele, singer
- Umberto Eco, novelist, literary critic, philosopher, semiotician and university professor
- Erdoğan, Turkish Prime minister at the time
- Father Georg Gänswein
- Francesco Guccini, singer
- Kim Jong-il
- Ignazio La Russa, former defence minister
- Carlo Lucarelli
- Don Antonio Mazzi
- fictional lawyer Messina (a parody of Carlo Taormina)
- Monsignor Emmanuel Milingo
- Gianni Minà, journalist
- Federico Moccia, author
- Gianni Morandi, singer
- Massimo Moratti, former owner of FC Internazionale
- Nanni Moretti
- Silvio Muccino
- Giorgio Napolitano, former president
- Nicoletta Orsomando, TV announcer
- Barbara Palombelli
- Romano Prodi, former prime minister
- Vladimir Putin, Russian Federation president
- Quasimodo of Notre Dame
- Vasco Rossi, singer
- Tony Sperandeo
- Oliviero Toscani
- director and host of a fictional calabrese Television who emulate RAI TV programs
- Bruno Vespa, TV host
- Martano Volpi
- Henry John Woodcock, former prosecutor of Potenza

== Viva Radio 2 on TV ==
Viva Radio 2 was aired on TV on Rai Uno beginning in December 2006, and was broadcast every evening on Rai Uno in weekday access prime time from 21 January 2008 to 2 February 2008 under the name Viva Radio 2... minuti.
