= Linjesender =

System for radio transmission via power lines

A linjesender (English: "line transmitter") was a low-power longwave transmitter system used for broadcasting in Norway with similar systems in other countries. It consisted of a power line communication system, which fed the radio programme on a frequency in the longwave broadcasting range into domestic powerlines. The power lines acted as a combination of transmission line and antenna.

The last linjesender in Norway was closed in 1987 although the Swiss counterpart survived another ten years.

== Features ==
The typical powers used by linjesenders were between 250 watts and 2 kW. Most systems used frequencies in the longwave band or in between the LW and MW band although some used medium wave or frequencies below the standard LW band which required special receivers.

Wired broadcasting had several advantages over conventional broadcasting:

1. Less susceptible to interference
2. Potentially greater number of programmes (as overcrowding on the frequency bands was less of a problem)
3. Potentially greater audio quality as wired transmissions were not subject to the same restrictions on bandwidth as terrestrial AM broadcasts.
4. In a mountainous country like Switzerland it was difficult to obtain satisfactory national coverage with conventional transmitters, particularly in the 1930s when transmissions were typically less powerful than today.

On the other hand there were practical and economic difficulties in extending such services to remote or thinly populated regions. Wired broadcasting could also be used by governments as a tool of censorship through promoting ownership of wire-only receivers which could not receive foreign stations.

== Similar systems ==
Similar systems were used in Germany, where it was called "Drahtfunk" ("wire radio") and in Switzerland, where it was called "Telefonrundspruch" ("telephone broadcast"), both of these systems used domestic telephone lines. In some countries occupied by Germany during the Second World War these systems entirely replaced conventional broadcasting. In the Netherlands all standard receivers were confiscated and replaced with wire-only sets (Draadomroep) as these could receive local and German broadcasts but not enemy stations such as the BBC. Wire broadcast systems were also deployed in parts of the USSR.

In the 1930s some towns in Great Britain used wire broadcasting experimentally either over dedicated cables (sometimes as baseband audio) or through power lines. However as the coverage of conventional broadcast stations improved the popularity of these "radio relay" or "rediffusion" systems waned and local councils were often hostile to their installation.

=== Russia ===
In the former Soviet Union, cable radio was popular and Radio Rossii is reported to have had as many as forty million listeners.

Initially the system had one channel that was transmitted as direct audio. The wires and plugs for the system were the same as for standard power wires and plugs which could cause receivers to burn out by attaching to mains socket. During World War II, all RF receivers were confiscated, but cable radio continued operating and, in particular, was used to transmit warnings of aerial bombing. The 1960s saw an enhancement with the addition of two additional channels, using AM on carrier frequencies of 78 and 120 kHz. The installation of this system became mandatory for all new buildings. The system, along with usual broadcasting, was created to inform people of emergencies.

Today, cable radio outlets are installed in all new homes, but many people don't use them or even uninstall the socket and wires inside their units. However, they continue to pay the mandatory fee (as of 2019, the price in Moscow is approx. 1.56 EUR per month). These payments can be avoided, but due to bureaucratic procedure it is rarely used. There were similar systems in other Soviet republics, such as Ukraine

== See also ==
- Cable radio An FM based system still used in some parts of the world.
- Carrier current A system used in the United States and some other places for very localised distribution of radio programming over electric power cables.
- CRN Digital Talk Radio Networks
- DMX (music)
- Draadomroep A similar system in the Netherlands.
- Drahtfunk A similar system in Germany.
- Filodiffusione A similar system in Italy.
- Galaxie
- Max Trax
- Music Choice
- Party line
- Power line communication
- Telefonrundspruch A similar system in Switzerland.
- Théâtrophone A system for disseminating opera and theatre performances over the public telephone network which predates regular broadcasting.
- Satellite radio
