= Rai Doc =

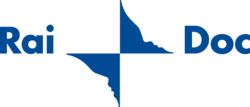
- Country: Italy
- Broadcast area: Italy
- Headquarters: Rome, Italy

Programming
- Language(s): Italian
- Picture format: 576i (SDTV)

Ownership
- Owner: Rai

History
- Launched: 1 April 2004
- Closed: 1 June 2007
- Replaced by: Rai Gulp

Rai Doc was an Italian entertainment TV channel owned by RAI and launched on 1 April 2004 on Digital television in Italy. It had culture-oriented scheduling with programmes dedicated to poetry, arts and movies. It also broadcast Late Night with Conan O'Brien, subtitled in Italian.

From 2005 the channel timeshared its programming with Rai Futura.

The channel was closed on 1 June 2007 with Rai Futura, following a decision by RAI, and replaced by Rai Gulp on the same frequencies.
