= Grapevine radio =

Type of early telephone-style system used to relay radio and locally produced programming

Grapevine radio refers to the transmission infrastructures, used for distributing audio programs, which were built to serve a small number of rural upstate South Carolina communities from the early 1930s to the middle 1940s. Despite their name, these systems did not employ radio transmitters, but were actually a type of "telephone newspaper", because the programs were sent telephonically over wires strung to subscribing homes.

The equipment used to distribute programming over a facility's wire network was located at a central site, for example a general store's back room. Programs normally consisted of retransmissions of radio stations, however, some programming was locally produced, originating from a studio at the distribution site or relayed from a local church or other gathering place. The locally produced programs included announcements and emergency messages, commercials and live performances. The transmissions were made daily, generally starting around 6 a.m. and running until 10:00 p.m. or midnight.

The grapevine systems soon became unneeded, because they primarily served homes that did not have electricity. Once a community received electric service the local grapevine system would soon close down, as the subscribers switched to radio receivers that could receive a wide selection of programs at no cost, instead of the single program and monthly fees characteristic of the grapevine systems.

== Historical background ==
Information about the grapevine installations (also called "speakerline") is limited, because of their brief history and the fact that they do not appear to have been established outside a small region of South Carolina. Unlike radio stations, they did not require government approval to operate. Their existence was also dependent on an unusual and short-lived economic and technical environment, as they required a central distribution site that had access to electricity, plus a surrounding community of prospective subscribers that did not have electric service.

Throughout the 1930s large parts of the United States, including most farms, did not have electricity. Although organized radio broadcasting had begun in the early 1920s, in rural upstate South Carolina there were no nearby radio stations strong enough to be picked up by battery-less crystal radio receivers, and although battery-powered sets existed, without electrical service there was no convenient way to recharge the batteries. The economic struggles caused by the Great Depression meant that many people could not even afford a newspaper subscription. Thus, there was a lack of entertainment and a strong sense of isolation in the region. As one person remembered, connecting to the grapevine service meant that "we had 'arrived' and were at last in touch with the outside world".

The rural electrification projects of the 1930s and 1940s eventually eliminated potential customers, making the grapevine systems no longer needed as their former customers switched to listening to radio stations.

== Initial installation at Mauldin ==
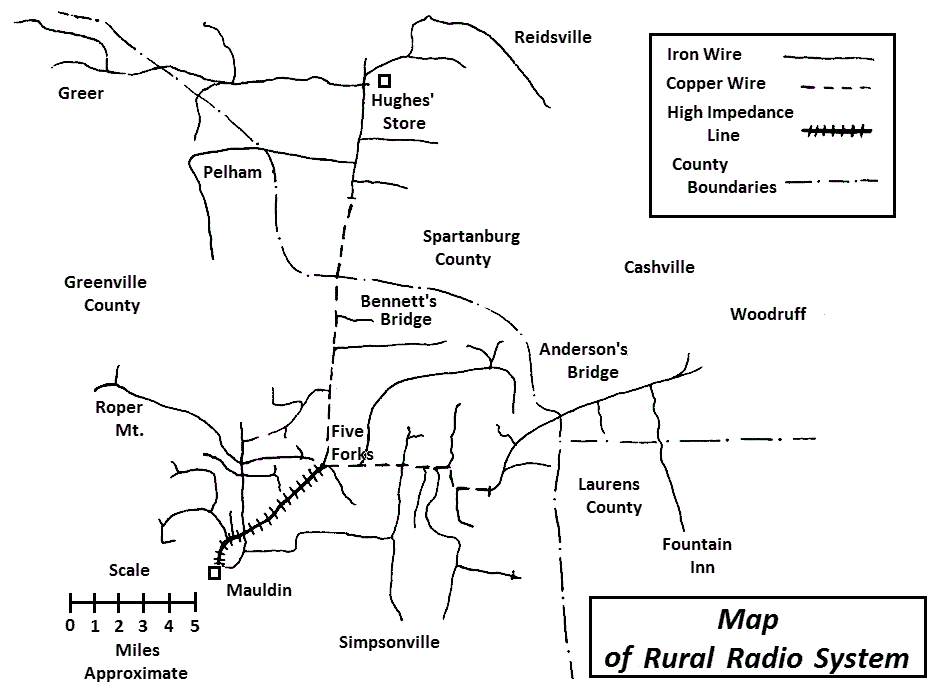
Wire layout of Gordon Rogers' "grapevine radio" installation as of 1936. The transmissions originated from his home near Mauldin, South Carolina.

The first grapevine system was begun in the winter of 1930-1931 by a high school student, Gordon F. Rogers, who lived on farm in central Greenville county near Mauldin, South Carolina. The Rogers farm, unlike most of its neighbors, had electrical service. Gordon Rogers had shown an early aptitude for engineering, developing a clock that automatically turned on the farm's chicken coop lights at 3:00 a.m., as well as an automated system for watering the chickens. Rogers also had an early interest in radio. Dissatisfied with a battery operated set, he successfully reconditioned a vacuum tube receiver that ran on AC electrical power. At this point he decided to also run a single-wire connection with a ground return from his receiver to a loudspeaker at the home of a neighbor who didn't have electricity. With this setup, whenever Rogers' radio was on the neighbor also heard what was being received. Word of this innovation quickly spread, and within a month lines had been run to seven nearby homes.

Rogers' system was essentially sending one-way telephone signals over his own wires, but he had to use voltages far higher than that used by standard telephone lines, because he was sending not only audio but also the power needed to operate what would become hundreds of loudspeakers. His initial setup output was 2.5 watts, but as the system expanded this was increased in steps over time to 350-400 watts. This occasionally led to issues when his wires ran too close to standard telephone lines, which sometimes picked up the strong grapevine transmissions. Special steps had to be taken to eliminate interference with the telephone company's service.

Subscribers had to provide the wire, poles (often actually fence posts) and speakers needed to connect to the main system lines. Unskilled attempts by individuals to tap into the lines without paying generally caused service disruptions for nearby customers, which made it possible to locate and remove the improper connections. Although at first the service was provided for free, as the number of participants grew Rogers began charging a monthly 10 cent fee. This charge was later raised to 25 cents, and at times a $1 surcharge was applied to finance replacement of sections of the transmission lines that needed to be upgraded from the original iron wire to higher quality materials. The system became profitable enough to finance Rogers' attendance at Clemson College. In 1933, at the time of his college enrollment, the system had 5 miles (8.0 kilometers) of lines and 15 subscribers. Increasing demand, spurred by finding a source of affordable speakers ($2.85 each), expanded the number of connections to more than 200 within the next four months, and by June 1934 the transmission lines spanned 15 miles (24 kilometers). By around 1935, there were 600 homes connected to the grapevine service, including sites in Spartanburg and Laurens counties, located up to 24 miles (39 kilometers) distant from the Rogers farm distribution site. The infrastructure had also grown to 400 miles (640 kilometers) of transmission lines.

Programming was provided for about 12 hours each day. Rogers introduced a "local talent" program that featured live performances. A record player provided music for times when static made it difficult to receive the radio rebroadcasts that provided most of the schedule. Provisions were also made to make local announcements. In addition, a carrier current link from the system based at Ware Place allowed programming originating at that location to be picked up and concurrently transmitted by the Mauldin system.

In the spring of 1936, Rogers, now a junior at Clemson, presented a paper, "Bringing Radio to the Rural Home", at a regional conference of the American Institute of Electrical Engineers, which provided technical information about his innovation. His review won first place in its category. The Mauldin-based system remained in operation until the area received electrical service, shutting down around 1939.

== Additional installations ==
=== Ware Place ===
Gordon Rogers' original system served northern Greenville county. A second wire network, originating from a small store in Ware Place, South Carolina, was later established which provided an extensive program service for the southern part of the county. The store's owners, J. R. Chandler, Jr. and his cousin J. E. Chandler, became familiar with the Mauldin facility, and around 1934 arranged for Gordon Rogers and Sherman Fox to install similar distribution equipment at their store. The Chandlers became active participants operating the system and supplying local programming. A studio, which included a piano and a pulpit, was built in the rear of the store. There was also a connection to the local school.

Subscribers were initially charged 25 cents a month, which was later increased to 35 cents. Individual homes had to maintain their local wire connections, and purchase their own speakers: $3 to $5 for a small one, and $7 to $8 for a large one. An unusual additional benefit resulted from the discovery that, after the grapevine programming ended for the night, individual subscribers could hear each other if they spoke loudly into their speakers, resulting in a form of party-line communication. At its peak over 500 homes were connected. The system continued to run during World War II in order to supply war news, after which it was shut down.

=== Hickory Tavern ===
This installation helped launch the political career of Robert C. Wasson, who went on to become the state's Tax Chairman. The Wasson family ran a small store in Hickory Tavern, South Carolina, located in southwest Laurens county. The needed equipment was purchased in March 1936 and the service was immediately popular. Later that year, when Robert Wasson announced what would be a successful candidacy for the state House of Representatives, a newspaper report noted that the store he ran "is known as Wasson Brothers store, mill, and grapevine radio system serving 200 rural homes".

Customers were charged 25 cents per month, and paid $6.50 for a small speaker or $10.50 for a large one — this fee included installation. Robert Wasson's mother, Effie Owens Wasson, handled most of the operational duties, and at its peak about 500 houses within a 12 miles (19 kilometers) radius were connected. Regular news reports and live entertainment made up an important part of the daily schedule. Advertising over the facility was credited with helping to establish the Eaddy-Blakes corner drug store in Laurens, and a former pharmacy employee later wrote that "were Dr. Eaddy still living I'm sure he would attribute the biggest thing to his success in the drug business was this advertising... It cost him about a dollar a week and he had every person from the area as a regular customer in a short time".

Robert Wasson served seven terms in the South Carolina legislature. One of his political objectives was getting electrical service for his community, and after the rural electrification program reached his district the grapevine service ceased operations in 1939.

=== Saylors Crossroads ===
Saylors Crossroads, South Carolina is a small community located in southeastern Anderson county. This system was inspired by the existence of the Ware Place operations, and was established by Charles Murdock in 1937. The Murdock family operated a general store, and a small studio was constructed in a building behind the store. The grapevine service was run by Selma Saylors, who was the twin sister of Charles Murdock's wife. Programming primarily consisted of relaying the transmissions of a local radio station, WAIM in Anderson. WAIM signed off at 9 p.m. each evening, and at that point the program source was switched to picking up "a station in Cincinnati" (presumably WLW). Local programming included the Sunday morning church services from Mount Bethel Baptist Church, carried from 1938 to 1940.

Subscribers paid 45 cents a month, and chose between three speaker sizes: a smaller square-shaped speaker for $7.50, a larger square-shaped speaker for $9.50, and a heart-shaped speaker for $12.50. The speaker purchases financed the installation of the wire connection to the main transmission lines. At its peak, the service had 500 subscribers. This system ended operations in 1941, after the community received electric service.

=== Williamston ===
This system was operated by Carl Ellison, who owned a general store located at Williamston, South Carolina in east central Anderson County. It remained in operation for "seven or eight years", starting sometime in the 1930s and continuing through at least 1940. It had also been initially inspired by the Ware Place operations.

The Ellisons lived in a house behind the general store, and they converted their living room to serve as a studio for locally produced programming. The service cost 50 cents a month, and reached 700 subscribers. Like the Ware Place system, after the grapevine programming ended for the night individuals could be heard by other subscribers by speaking loudly into their speakers. The system featured ministers from Greenville who preached over the system on Friday nights. It also carried the Sunday services from the First Baptist Church in Williamston.

=== Other sites ===
Gordon Rogers estimated that a total of ten to twelve grapevine operations were eventually installed, all located in South Carolina. Additional locations reportedly included Walhalla (located in the center of South Carolina's westernmost county, Oconee), another "near Mauldin", and one "across the Savannah river from Augusta, Georgia".
