= Rai Radio 3 =

Italian radio channel

- Italy
- Broadcast area: Italy - National FM, DAB & DVB-T and Satellite

Programming
- Format: Talk, classical music

Ownership
- Owner: RAI
- Sister stations: Rai Radio 1, Rai Radio 2, Rai Radio Tutta Italiana, Rai Radio 3 Classica, Rai Isoradio

History
- First air date: 1 October 1950; 76 years ago
- Former names: Terzo Programma (1950–1975)

Links
- Webcast: RaiPlay Sound
- Website: RaiPlay Sound

Rai Radio 3 (Radio Tre) is an Italian radio channel operated by the state-owned public-broadcasting organization RAI and specializing in culture and classical music. It is currently directed by Andrea Montanari.

Founded on 1 October 1950 as the Terzo programma, it was loosely based on its British namesake, the BBC Third Programme, which had been established in 1946. It adopted its current name in 1976.

== Program schedule ==
Radio 3 is a thematic channel focused on the cultural sphere, within the scope of classical music and avant-garde music (including live concerts), drama, literature, readings of classic works, history, economics, philosophy, religion, mythology, art and cinema. Information is presented with a critical and analytical slant. In the past, no commercials were broadcast on this channel. All the transmissions are produced by Radio Rai.

Until September 2017, at night, at the end of the program schedule, the network connects with Rai Radio 3 Classica, a cable radio, Dab+, DTT and internet channel broadcasting classical music. This ended however in September 2017 when Rai Radio 3 started its own night programmes. Since August 2022 Rai Radio 3 connects again with Rai Radio 3 Classica during the night from 2 AM (1:30 on Saturday and Sunday) to 6. The radio news headline is hosted in three main editions (at 8.45, 13.45 and 18.45) and other shorter editions in the course of the day.

In addition, the channel broadcasts the events of Euroradio, a network of European public radio stations committed to classical music, jazz and cultural events.

It broadcast one of the long-lived strips of classical music, "Concerto ogni sera" (A concert every evening), then "Concerto della sera" (The evening's concert), which aired from 4 January 1953 to December 1977, around 19.15. Beforehand, from 1951 to 1953 aired "Concerto d'apertura" (Opening concert) at 20.30, which was replaced by "Spazio Tre".

== Logos ==
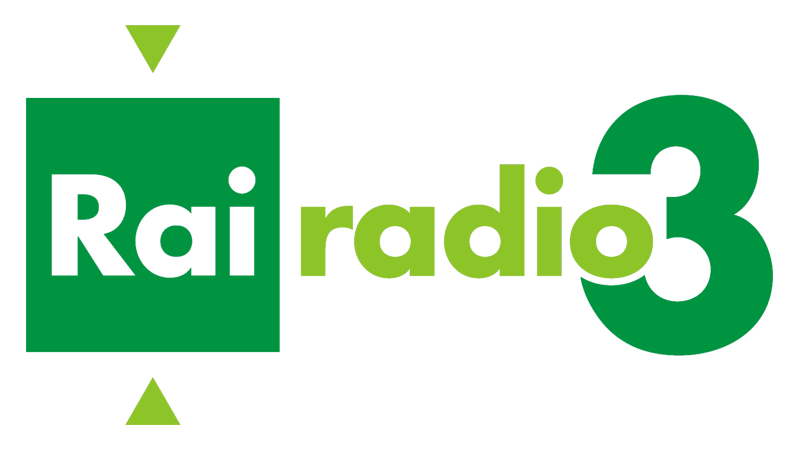
2000–2010	2010–2015	2015–2017	2017–present

== See also ==
- Radio3 Scienza
