= Alice Home TV =

Italian pay TV platform

Alice Home TV was Telecom Italia IPTV service in Italy launched in November 2005.

Sky Italia and Mediaset Premium channels were available with a separate subscription.
