= Rai Radio 3 Classica =

- Italy
- Broadcast area: Italy: DAB and FM in certain areas, DVB-T, Cable radio, Hotbird, Internet

Programming
- Format: Classical music

Ownership
- Owner: RAI
- Sister stations: Rai Radio 1, Rai Radio 2, Rai Radio 3, Rai Radio Tutta Italiana, Rai Isoradio

History
- First air date: 1 December 1958; 67 years ago
- Former names: V-VI Canale Filodiffusione RAI; FD Auditorium; Rai Radio FD 5 Rai Radio 5 Classica; Rai Radio Classica

Links
- Webcast: RaiPlay Sound
- Website: RaiPlay Sound

Rai Radio 3 Classica is a radio channel, owned and produced by the Italian State broadcaster RAI, which broadcasts uninterrupted classical music without commercials.

Until August 2015 it was known as Rai Radio FD 5, and before that as FD Auditorium. From 2015 till 2017 the station was called Rai Radio 5 Classica. Until 31 December 2019 it was called Rai Radio Classica.

== Broadcasting ==
The channel is distributed via:

- the cable radio service Filodiffusione, which was launched in 1958 by RAI and SIP (now Telecom Italia)
- the Hot Bird satellite using DAB technology
- the digital terrestrial DVB-T network (available in Italy only)
- Internet Portal Rai Play Sound

Rai Radio 3 Classica, unlike its sister channel Rai Radio Tutta Italiana, can also be heard on FM in five Italian cities: Rome (on 100.3 MHz), Turin (101.8), Milan (102.2), Naples (103.9), and Ancona (106.0). It is also relayed overnight by Rai Radio 3, generally between 2 AM (1:30 on Saturday and Sunday) and 6. From September 2017 to August 2022 Rai Radio 3 had its own night programming. Rai Radio TRST A also relays Rai Radio 3 Classica daily from 19:35 till 06:58 hrs on FM in the area of Trieste.

== Earlier logos ==
2000–2010	2010–2015	2015–2017	2017–2019	2020–present
