= Rai Radio Tutta Italiana =

- Italy
- Broadcast area: Italy - Some Areas DAB and DVB-T, Cable radio and Hotbird & Internet

Programming
- Format: Italian contemporary popular music

Ownership
- Owner: RAI
- Sister stations: Rai Radio 1, Rai Radio 2, Rai Radio 3, Rai Radio 3 Classica, Rai Südtirol, Rai Isoradio

History
- First air date: 1 December 1958; 67 years ago
- Former names: IV Canale Filodiffusione; FD Leggera; Rai Radio FD 4 Rai Radio 4 Light

Links
- Webcast: RaiPlay Sound
- Website: RaiPlay Sound

Rai Radio Tutta Italiana is a radio channel owned and produced by the Italian state-owned public-service broadcasting organization RAI.

Until 11 June 2017 it was known as Rai Radio 4 Light and broadcast continuous pop, rock, fusion, jazz, Latin American, movie soundtrack, melodic, and easy-listening orchestral music, without commercials. In the past it had also been known as Rai Radio FD4, FD Leggera, and IV Canale Filodiffusione. Since the name change on 12 June 2017 the channel has broadcast only Italian music.

== Broadcasting ==
Rai Radio Tutta Italiana is distributed on Filodiffusione – the cable radio system launched in 1958 by RAI and SIP, now Telecom Italia – and also broadcast digitally using terrestrial DAB (in Italy only) and DVB-S from the Eutelsat Hot Bird 6 satellite (which covers Europe, North Africa, and the Middle East).

Since July 2017 Rai Radio Tutta Italiana also broadcast on Rai GR Parlamento which has FM-coverage during hours when there is no political programming. When there is no political debatjes mostly from 21:00 till 07:00 hrs.

== Earlier logos ==
2000–2010	2010–2015	2015–2017	2017–present
