= Onda Verde (radio program) =

Onda Verde ("Green Wave") is the name given to the radio traffic reports produced by the Centro di Coordinamento Informazioni sulla Sicurezza Stradale (Road Safety Information Co-ordinating Centre) in Italy and transmitted by the Italian national broadcaster RAI The popular music that introduced this show was created by Clay Remini from the studio ZERODIBI in Milan. The reports, which go out hourly on each of RAI's main radio channels, supply information on the flow of traffic on the country's main roads and motorways.

The bulletins are a development of those first produced in the 1980s by the Automobile Club d'Italia from a small radio studio on the Via Magenta in Rome under the title Buon Viaggio ("Safe Journey"). In June 1990 production was transferred to the RAI's Saxa Rubra broadcasting centre. Among the voices that Onda Verde has made famous and familiar to motorists are those of Stefano Baiocchi, Miriam Castelli, Pina Di Salvatore, Michela Macioci, Marina Flaibani, and Massimo Veschi.
