= RAI =

State-owned Italian broadcasting company

Coordinates: 41°55′4″N 12°27′59″E

RAI – Radiotelevisione italiana S.p.A.
- Logo used since 2016

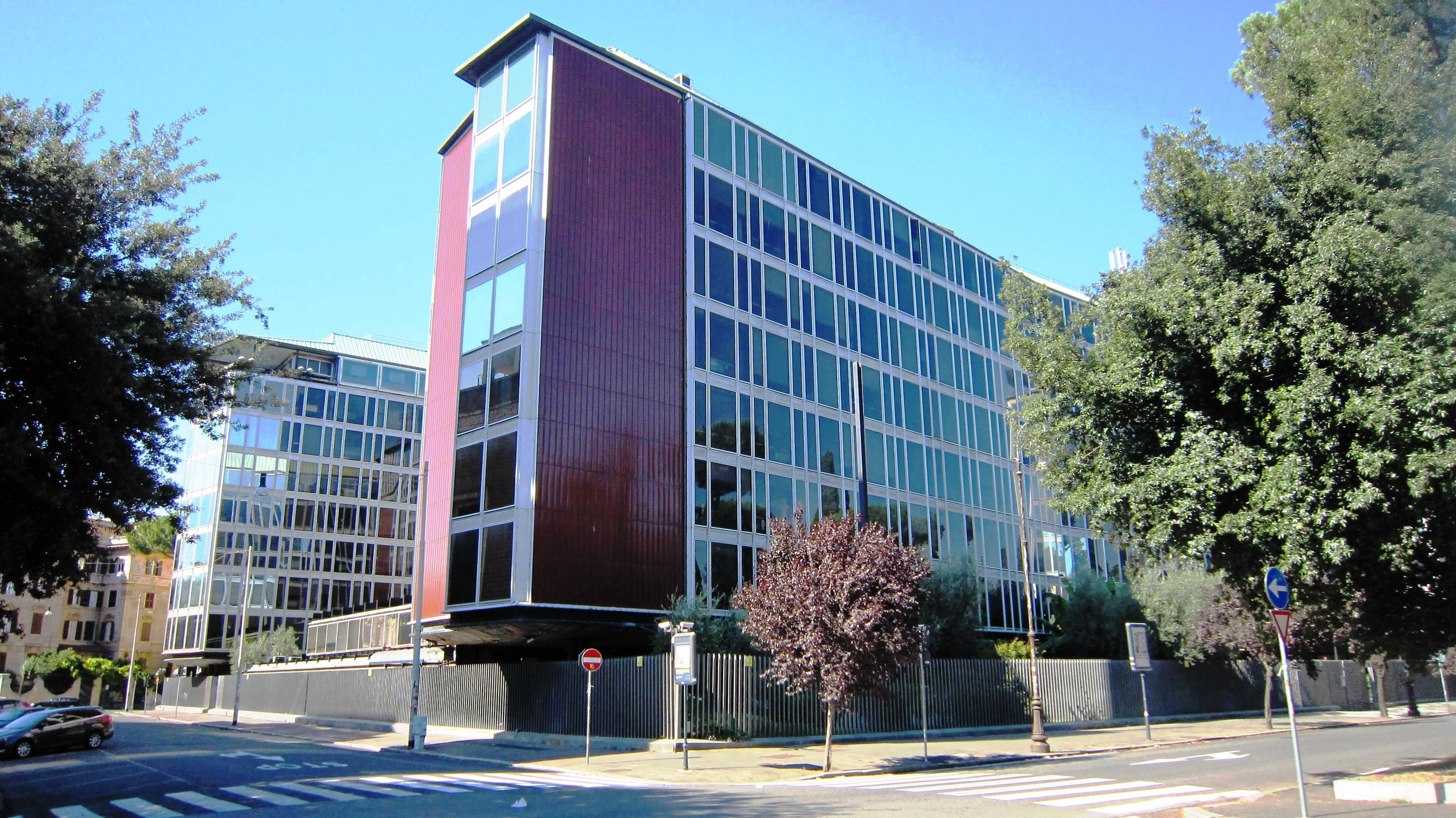
- RAI headquarters in Rome
- Type: Società per azioni (S.p.A.), state-owned
- Industry: Mass media
- Founded: 1924; 102 years ago (as URI); 1944; 82 years ago (as RAI); 1954; 72 years ago (as RAI S.p.A.)
- Founder: Government of Italy
- Headquarters: 14 Viale Giuseppe Mazzini, Rome, Italy
- Area served: Italy and other neighbouring countries
- Key people: Marinella Soldi (chairperson); Roberto Sergio (CEO)
- Products: Broadcasting
- Services: Television; radio; web portal
- Revenue: ▲€2.52 billion (2021)
- Net income: ▲€30.44 million (2021)
- Owner: Ministry of Economy and Finance
- Number of employees: 12,605 (2023)
- Subsidiaries: Rai Way S.p.A.; Rai Pubblicità S.p.A.; Rai Com S.p.A.; Rai Cinema S.p.A.; 01 Distribution S.r.l.
- Website: www.rai.it; www.raiplay.it; www.raiplaysound.it

RAI – Radiotelevisione italiana (Italian: [ˈrai ˌradjoteleviˈzjoːne itaˈljaːna]; "Italian Radio [and] Television"), commercially styled as Rai since 2000 and known until 1954 as Radio Audizioni Italiane (RAI), (Note: Originally a distinction was made in Italian between wireless telegraphy (radiofonia) and wireless telephony (radioaudizione circolare). The latter term has now fallen into disuse.) is the national public broadcasting company of Italy, owned by the Ministry of Economy and Finance. RAI operates many terrestrial and subscription television channels and radio stations. It is one of the biggest broadcasters in Europe and the biggest in Italy, competing with Mediaset and other minor radio and television networks. RAI has a relatively high television audience share of about 35.9%.

Half of RAI's revenues come from the broadcast receiving licence fees, the remainder from the sale of advertising time. In 1950, RAI became one of the 23 founding members of the European Broadcasting Union.

== Structure ==
RAI is 99% owned by the Italian Government Ministry of Economy and Finance and is the sole licensee (concessionaria in esclusiva) of the radio, television, and multimedia broadcasting public service. For this reason, the agreement with the Government prescribes a series of rules and guarantees that RAI must follow to ensure fair public service to the citizens.

Management and Board of Directors are elected by the ruling Parliament through the Parliamentary Commission for the General Direction and Supervision of Broadcasting Services (Commissione parlamentare per l'indirizzo generale e la vigilanza dei servizi radiotelevisivi), every three years, in agreement with almost all parliamentary exponents, usually following the political side of the majority and leaving some space for minor roles to minority parties exponents.

RAI is formally a private joint-stock company (società per azioni), although all stocks are state-owned; its company statute describes how the strict relationship with the Republic is also ruled by different national laws. The most recent one is the 2015 Riforma della Rai, "Rai Reform", i.e. the 2015 law no. 220, including the Testo unico della Radiotelevisione ('Consolidated Law on Radio and Television'). RAI and broadcasting are supervised by the commission, which also rules economic budgets and main regulations, including public service's electoral segments during electoral campaigns.

== History ==
=== 1924 ===
Unione Radiofonica Italiana (URI) was formed in 1924 with the backing of the Marconi Company following a model adopted in other European countries. URI made its inaugural broadcast—a speech by Benito Mussolini (1883–1945) at Teatro Costanzi—on 5 October. Regular programming began the following evening, with a quartet performing Haydn's Quartet No. 7 in A major from Palazzo Corradi. At 21.00 CET, Ines Donarelli Viviani announced for the first time: "URI—Unione Radiofonica Italiana Rome station 1RO 425 metres wavelength. To all those who are listening our greetings, good evening." Guglielmo Marconi's S.A. Radiofono—Società Italiana per le Radiocomunicazioni Circolari (Radiofono) held 85% of URI shares and Western Electric's Società Italiana Radio Audizioni Circolari (SIRAC) held the remaining 15%.

Under the provisions of Royal Decree No. 1067 of 8 February 1923, wireless broadcasting became a state monopoly under the control of the Ministry of Posts and Telegraphs; URI was commissioned to provide services for a minimum of six years pursuant to Royal Decree No. 2191 of 14 October 1924 Concessione dei servizi radioauditivi circolari alla Società Anonima Unione Radiofonica Italiana. When URI's contract expired in 1927, it was succeeded under Royal Decree Law No. 2207 of 17 November 1927 by the partially nationalised Ente Italiano per le Audizioni Radiofoniche (EIAR), which became Radio Audizioni Italiane S.p.A. (RAI) with investment from Società Idroelettrica Piemontese (SIP) in 1944.

=== 1940s ===
During the reconstruction following World War II, much of RAI's early programming was influenced by the "Reithian" style of the BBC. The emphasis was on educational content. Programs such as Non è mai troppo tardi and Un viaggio al Po introduced people to what life was like in other parts of the country, at a time when most people could not afford to travel.

Over the following years, RAI made various changes to its services. It reorganised its radio stations in November 1946 into two national networks, Rete Rossa and Rete Azzurra ('Red Network' and 'Blue Network'). It added the culture-based Terzo Programma in October 1950. On 1 January 1952, the Rete Rossa became the Programma Nazionale (focusing on informational content) and the Rete Azzurra became the Secondo Programma (with a greater emphasis on entertainment). The three radio channels eventually became today's Rai Radio 1, Rai Radio 2, and Rai Radio 3.

=== 1950s ===
In 1954, the state-owned holding company Istituto per la Ricostruzione Industriale (IRI) became the sole shareholder and URI—now renamed RAI – Radiotelevisione italiana to reflect its extended responsibilities—finally began a regular television service. On 3 January at 11:00 CET, the first RAI television announcer presented the day's schedule, which was broadcast from the service's Milan headquarters and relay stations in Turin and Rome. At 14:30, the first regular programme in Italian television history was broadcast: Arrivi e partenze, hosted by Armando Pizzo and Mike Bongiorno. The evening's entertainment was a theatre performance, L'osteria della posta, written by Carlo Goldoni. 23:15 saw the start of the day's concluding programme, La Domenica Sportiva—the first edition of a weekly series which continues to this day. First experimental color tests started during 1968, official first tests during 1972, full-color TV started in 1977.

=== 2000s ===
RAI was originally the subsidiary of RAI Holding S.p.A. RAI Holding was absorbed into RAI as of 1 December 2004, per Article 21 of Law 112/04. RAI is governed by a nine-member Administrative Council. Seven of the members are elected by a committee of the Italian Parliament. The other two (one of which is the president) are nominated by the largest shareholder: the Ministry of Economic Development. The Council appoints the Director-General. The Director-General and the members of the Administrative Council are appointed for a renewable three-year term.

In 2005, the government of Silvio Berlusconi proposed partial privatisation of RAI by selling 20% of its ownership. This proposal was very controversial, in part because Berlusconi was the head of the leading private broadcaster Mediaset. Some critics stated that Mediaset could become the buyer and thus increase its dominant position. After the revelation that RAI would lose €80m ($96m, £54m) in 2006, the privatisation plan was suspended in October 2005.

=== 2010s ===
On 18 May 2010, Raisat received a major upgrade and re-branded with a new logo and a new name. It and all of the sister channels dropped the sat part from the name and became Rai YoYo, Rai 5 (formerly known as Rai Extra), Rai Premium, and Rai Movie (formerly known as Raisat Cinema). On 11 June 2013, RAI was one of the few European broadcasters to condemn and criticise the closure of Greece's state broadcaster ERT. RAI is 99% owned by the Italian Government Ministry of Economy and Finance, so it is said that it broadcasts content that may politically influence people.

=== Corporate identity ===
Logo used from 1949 to 1954 uses via roma font

The Erberto Carboni logo used from 3 January 1954 to 1970

3rd logo of RAI used from 1970 to 1982 designed by Alberto Ribero

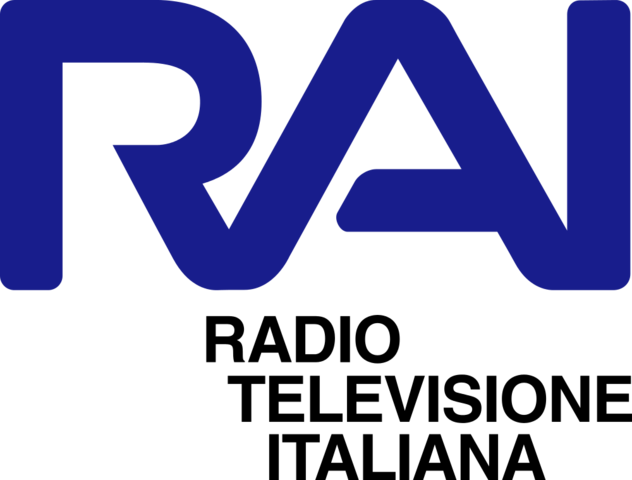
RAI logo from 3 October 1983 to 26 September 1988 (Studio ARA)

The Giorgio Macchi redesign used from 26 September 1988 to 16 March 2000

The "butterfly" logo used from 16 March 2000 to 17 May 2010 (AReA)

RAI logo from 18 May 2010 to 11 September 2016 (FrameByFrame)

Current variation of the logo introduced on 12 September 2016

The Alberto Ribera logo was introduced in 1967, however, this did not have significant application except on studios and portable cameras. A second variation of the Carboni logo was introduced in 1977, which was not officially adopted but appeared in some graphics, including that of the time signal.

== Controversies ==
=== Political fairness and balance between public service and commercial TV market ===
RAI's broadcasts content and nominees are frequently accused of political bias, depending both on the management for each channel or programme, and on the lack of meritocracy in contracts with television hosts and technicians, also concerting cachets and salaries. However, many people underline that RAI needs to balance political equity and public services with the market rules and competitors. All these issues are ongoing.

RAI's main channels are considered slightly politically oriented: Rai 1 is liberal or centre-right, Rai 2 is usually more right-oriented, while Rai 3 typically has the majority of left oriented programmes and hosts Fabio Fazio and Bianca Berlinguer, or the journalistic deep investigation programme Report, famous for its investigations over far-right scandals. This issue in Italy is referred as lottizzazione and is yet to be solved.

=== Political censorship and civil rights advocacy controversies ===
RAI is frequently subjected to controversies and censorship accusations regarding political matters, especially civil rights and LGBT issues. The broadcaster was strongly accused in 2008 of cutting the gay love scene of the Oscar-winning movie Brokeback Mountain. RAI initially apologised for the cut, explaining that the cut was due to a pre-cut edition originally planned for the prime-time slot, and wasn't corrected when airing was shifted to the late-night slot. Critics noticed that similar scenes of heterosexual lovers were never cut out before in prime-time and reinforcing the accusation of homophobic censorship. The company rescheduled a new uncut version of the movie, but this was aired again in an even later time slot, a choice seen as a confirmation of the accusation. Only two years later, the movie aired again with all homosexual sex and kisses cut off. RAI was forced again to apologise, accusing a problem" with the pre-cut edition by the distribution company and a lack of fact-checking by the RAI employee.

In 2011, episode 125 of the German TV Soap Um Himmels Willen ('For Heaven's Sake'), shown in Italy since 2004, was entitled Romeo and Romeo and due to screen on Rai 1 but was left out in order to "avoid controversy", according to the broadcaster. In 2016, during the first clear broadcast of the show How to Get Away with Murder, on Rai 2, the gay kisses for one of the main characters (portrayed by Jack Falahee) were completely cut off. RAI apologised again, stating that the incident was "merely the mistake of an overzealous editor". Criticism on the social media platforms was so strong that Falahee and showrunner Shonda Rhimes both tweeted against the network's "inexcusable" censorship.

==== Fedez controversy ====
In 2021, another accusation was made against RAI by Italian rapper Fedez. During the 1 May Concertone, a traditional Italian TV broadcast concert in celebration of the International Workers' Day, the rapper was invited to perform and have a speech on the stage. The rapper honoured the entertainment workers affected by the COVID-19 pandemic and spent half of his speech in support of legislation that would punish violence against women and LGBT people as hate crimes in Italy. During his speech, he recalled all the political exponents' hate speech (confirmed by videos or sentenced by court) during the late years, and accused Rai 3's executive of trying censoring his speech by order of superiors as "this is how it works". RAI immediately denied all accusations and Fedez leaked a recorded audio of the conversation between him and the executives, where managers and hosts (declaring their names and roles to him) tried to censor his speech, by "asking you to adapt to a system that you probably don't get".

After the video was reposted by all national media and web news sites, RAI sued the rapper, while a parliamentary investigation was opened. Fedez replied he was proud and ready to face the court, and he said he was available as a testimony for the RAI's Superior Commission. Fedez's accusation was one of the biggest media scandals of RAI, as not only all political parties took sides in the cause (centre and left in favour of the rapper, including ex-prime ministers Giuseppe Conte and Enrico Letta, while right and far-right parties in favour of RAI, including Matteo Salvini and Giorgia Meloni's colleagues). The scandal increased when the parliamentary commission denied a hearing with Fedez, only speaking with RAI's executives. In the very much criticised email answer (which screenshot was published by Fedez on Instagram) the Office of the Commission stated that even if not prohibited by law, it was not custom to invite external people to the Commission investigation. Fedez replied to the email with only three clown emojis, a fact that further angered the far-right politicians.

In July, the new board of RAI was elected, including the CEO and executives; this led to RAI's CEO Fuortes revealing not only the withdrawal of the action in court for failing all the required accusatory elements but also that no legal action was ever meant by the new management. Far-right exponents opened a parliamentary question over the withdrawal. After the CEO's declaration, no other details were said about any apology or agreement with Fedez: nonetheless, the rapper was invited by Fabio Fazio to the first episode of the new season of his late show. Following the 2021 controversy, Fedez reinforced some controversy against RAI when he announced he was not invited to the 2022 Concertone for the first time.

==== Editorial independence ====
Shortly after the Meloni government took office in October 2022, influential managers were replaced, and well-known journalists and presenters such as Fabio Fazio, Bianca Berlinguer, and Lucia Annunziata left RAI. In 2023, Giorgia Meloni was accused of pressuring out the head of RAI for not supporting her political agenda. In 2024, Meloni called for her government's ministers to be given more speaking time in the European election campaign. In doing so, she called on the RAI to violate the law "par conditiono", according to which all parties must receive the same amount of broadcasting time. The resistance to this was massive, and the plans are off the table for the time being.

==== Accusing of censorship on Liberation Day 2024 ====
Antonio Scurati, a well-known Italian writer and expert of the history of fascism, was commissioned by the public broadcaster RAI to read a speech on the day of liberation from fascism (Italian: Festa della Liberazione) on 25 April. However, at short notice, Scurati was disinvited again and was no longer allowed to give his speech. The presenter of the show did not want to accept that and quickly decided to read out his words in front of the camera.

A passage from Scurati states, "As long as those who govern us do not utter the word anti-fascism, the specter of fascism will continue to haunt the house of Italian democracy." It is a clear criticism of Prime Minister Meloni, because the leader of the Fratelli d'Italia party has not distanced herself from her party's fascist beginnings.

He was turned down for ideological and political reasons, Scurati told the German public broadcaster ARD. "I criticized the fact that, during the 19 months of Meloni's government, the Prime Minister insisted on the reading of history that corresponds to her neo-fascist background, i.e. she shifted the blame for the slaughter and massacres onto the German Nazis, even though the fascists of Salò were accomplices and collaborators."

=== Budget and unjustified expenses ===
RAI was investigated and fined (with many executives arrested or fired) for unjustified expenses and suspicious gifts. It was noticed that, frequently, dinners, expensive watches and jewellery were all paid by RAI for unknown people outside the company. In 2022, a new scandal was investigated by the Guardia di Finanza surrounding corruption and bribes. At least 5 people in total were arrested, while the investigation is still ongoing.

== TV channels ==
=== Current channels ===
==== In high definition and ultra definition ====
| Logo | Name | Launched | Description |
|---|---|---|---|
| | Rai 1 | 3 January 1954 | Generalist and family-oriented |
| | Rai 2 | 4 November 1961 | Generalist, catering towards youth/urban audiences |
| | Rai 3 | 15 December 1979 | Cultural and regional programming |
| | Rai 4 | 14 July 2008 | Youth/urban programming and movies |
| | Rai 5 | 26 November 2010 | Arts and culture programming |
| | Rai 4K | 17 June 2016 | Ultra HD 4K programming channel |
| | Rai Movie | 1 July 1999 | Films |
| | Rai Premium | 31 July 2003 | Popular fiction and films |
| | Rai Gulp | 1 June 2007 | Shows for older children and pre-teens (Ages 8–15) |
| | Rai Yoyo | 1 November 2006 | Shows for younger children and preschoolers (Ages 2–5) |
| | Rai News 24 | 26 April 1999 | Rolling news coverage |
| | Rai Storia | 2 February 2009 | Documentaries about history and culture |
| | Rai Sport | 1 February 1999 | Sports coverage news |
| | Italiana (powered by Rai) | 1 October 2026 | Documentary, cultural and cuisine |

Programming on Rai 1/2/3 and Sport via satellite is encrypted outside Italy due to programming and sports rights.

==== International ====
| Logo | Name | Launched | Description |
|---|---|---|---|
| | Rai Italia | 1 January 1992 | Catered towards Italian expatriates |
| | Rai World Premium | 6 May 2013 | Italian culture and national TV shows |

==== Regional ====
| Name | Launched | Language | Region |
|---|---|---|---|
| Rai Alto Adige | 1960 | Italian | Trentino-Alto Adige/Südtirol |
| Rai Ladinia | 26 September 1988 | Ladin | Trentino-Alto Adige/Südtirol |
| Rai Südtirol | 7 February 1966 | German | Trentino-Alto Adige/Südtirol |
| Rai 3 BIS FJK | 1995 | Italian and Slovene | Friuli-Venezia Giulia/Furlanija Julijska Krajina |
| Rai Vd'A | 1968 | Italian and French | Valle d'Aosta/Vallée d'Aoste |

=== Discontinued channels ===
- Rai Azzurri: UEFA Euro 2004 (2004, broadcast using Rai Utile frequencies)
- Rai Doc: cultures, styles (1 April 2004 – 1 June 2007)
- Rai Extra: generalist (31 July 2003 – 26 November 2010)
- Rai Festival: Sanremo Music Festival 2004 (2004, broadcast using Rai Utile frequencies)
- Rai Futura: technologies, video games, etc. (30 May 2005 – 1 February 2007, broadcast on the same frequences of Rai Doc at settled times)
- Rai HD (22 April 2008 – 18 September 2016)
- Rai Med (26 April 2001 – April 2014)
- Rai Olimpia: 2004 Summer Olympics (2004, broadcast using Rai Utile frequencies)
- Rai Sport 2 (18 May 2010 – 5 February 2017)
- Rai Sport 2 HD (1 August – 19 September 2016, HD version launched for 2016 Summer Olympics and 2016 Summer Paralympics)
- Rai UniNettuno Sat Uno (1998 – April 2014)
- Rai Nettuno Sat Due (2003 – 1 February 2009)
- Rai Utile (4 January 2004 – 1 January 2008)
- Rai Widescreen: 1998 FIFA World Cup (1998–1999)
- Rai On Cultura (IPTV)
- Rai On Fiction (IPTV)
- Rai On Fiction Live (IPTV)
- Rai On News (IPTV)
- Rai On Ragazzi (IPTV)
- Rai On Spettacolo (IPTV)
- Rai On Sport (IPTV)
- RaiSat 1 (1997–1999)
- RaiSat 2 (1997–1999)
- RaiSat 3 or Rai Educational Sat (1997–2000)
- RaiSat Album (1 June 1999 – 30 July 2003)
- RaiSat Art (1 June 1999 – 30 July 2003)
- RaiSat Fiction (2000 – 30 July 2003)
- RaiSat Gambero Rosso Channel (1999 – 31 July 2009)
- RaiSat Ragazzi (1 July 1999 – 31 October 2006)
- RaiSat Show (1 June 1999 – 31 July 2003)
- RaiSat Smash Girls (1 November 2006 – 1 August 2009)
- Salute! (2009–2010)
- Yes Italia (2009–2012)
- Rai Scuola (2009–2026)

== Radio stations ==
Rai Radio logo (September 2017)

=== Current stations ===
On FM, Satellite, DAB/DAB+, DTT, Web:

- Rai Radio 1: news and sports
- Rai Radio 2: adult contemporary music and talk shows
- Rai Radio 3: classical music and culture
- Rai Radio 3 Classica: classic and opera music
- Rai Gr Parlamento: coverage of proceedings in the Italian Parliament
- Rai Isoradio: for motorway users

Regional stations:

- Rai Südtirol: German-language programmes for the Trentino-Alto Adige/Südtirol region
- Rai Radio Trst A: Slovene-language programmes for the Friuli-Venezia Giulia/Furlanija Julijska Krajina region
- Rai Friuli Venezia Giulia: Italian, Friulian and Slovene language programmes; as Rai Friûl Vignesie Julie (in Friulian) and Rai Furlanija Julijska Krajina (in Slovenian)
- Rai Vd'A: Italian, French and Valdôtain programmes

Only on Satellite, DAB/DAB+, DTT, and Web:

- Rai Radio Tutta Italiana: only Italian music
- Rai Radio Techete': featuring items from the radio archives
- Rai Radio Live Napoli: music from Naples
- Rai Radio Kids: station for children from 2 to 10 years old
- Rai Radio 1 Sport: sports
- No Name Radio: independent music

=== Discontinued stations ===
- RaiStereoUno (1982–1991)
- RaiStereoDue (1982–1991)
- RaiStereoNotte (1982–1995)
- RadioVerdeRai (1991–1994)
- StereoRai (1991–1994)
- Rai Italia Radio (1 July 1930 – 31 December 2011)
- Notturno Italiano (1952–2011)
- Radio Rai Sport
- Rai Radio 8 Opera (6 August 2015 – 11 June 2017)
- Rai Radio Indie (first Rai Radio 2 Indie; 18 June 2018 – 16 December 2022)

== Divisions and subsidiaries ==
Strutture Rai ('Rai Structures') is a news organisation internal to RAI, or rather an internal management and division, created in order to independently manage the programs broadcast on the generalist and, in particular, thematic networks. After 2000, RAI reorganised its corporate structure with the creation of specific structures, listed here:

- Rai Cultura (previously Rai Educational or Rai Edu): operates event and documentary channels
- Rai Documentari: documentary productions
- Rai Expo: supporting and making the public aware of the Expo 2015 event in Milan
- Rai Fiction: production company for feature films, TV films, etc.
- Rai Giornale Radio: the radio newsroom
- Rai Gold: management of thematic channels dedicated to cinema and television series
- Rai Kids: children's programming and production company
- Rai Meteo: weather forecasts and reports
- Rai News: production of news and information services such as Televideo
- Rai Notte (1996–2012): overnight TV programming on Rai 1, 2, and 3
- Rai Parlamento: operates the Rai Gr Parlamento, Senato della Repubblica and Camera dei deputati channels
- Rai Quirinale: transmits broadcasts from the President's Quirinale Palace
- Rai Radio: production of radio programs, generally in Rome, and management for the radio division
- Rai Sport: production of live coverage of sporting events on the three generalist channels (Rai 1, Rai 2, Rai 3) and its own channel of the same name
- Rai Teche: the broadcast archives
- Rai Vaticano: transmits broadcasts from the Vatican
- Struttura Grandi Eventi: production and broadcast of major events
- TG1: production of news and information services on Rai 1
- TG2: production of news and information services on Rai 2
- TG3: production of news and information services on Rai 3
- TGR: production of local news and information regional services on Rai 3

=== Related companies ===
- Rai Cinema (1998–): film production company
  - 01 Distribution (2000–): film distributor
  - Rai Cinema International Distribution (2024–): international film sales
- Rai Click (2000–2009): television programs on demand, later replaced by Rai On
- Rai Com (2015–): promotes the marketing rights of the productions
- Rai Pubblicità (1926–): advertising agency
- Rai Corporation (1960–2012): production, distribution, and marketing in the United States
  - Rai Corporation Canada (1987–2012)
- RaiNet (1999–2014): managed the web portals from the rai.it and rai.tv domains
- RaiSat (1997–2010): subsidiary created to produce thematic TV channels for satellite television
- Rai Trade (1987–2011): promoted the marketing rights of the productions
- Rai World (2011–2014), previously Rai Internazionale (1995–2011): radio and television distribution abroad, operated Rai Italia
- Rai Way (1999–): broadcasting network for the distribution of the broadcast signal
- Sacis (1955–1997): television rights management and marketing

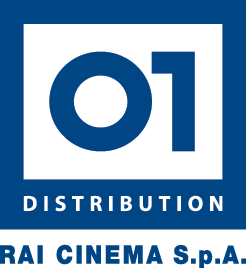

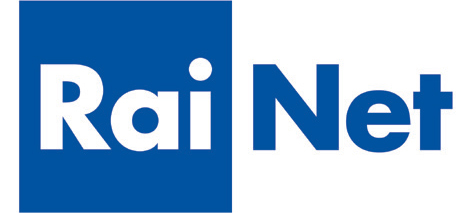

=== Other services ===
- Rai Alto Adige: broadcasts television and radio programs throughout the territory of Alto Adige and Trentino
- Rai Libri: magazine and broadcast publisher
- Rai Mobilità (TV) and Rai Ondaverde (radio): traffic reports (known as Onda Verde) produced by the Centro di coordinamento informazioni sulla sicurezza stradale (Road safety information coordination center)
- Rai Orchestra: the broadcaster's radio orchestra
- RaiPlay: multimedia platform
  - RaiPlay Sound
  - RaiPlay Yoyo
- Rai Vd'A: produces and broadcasts radio and television programs in Italian and French on the territory of the Aosta Valley. There are also broadcasts in the Valdôtain dialect.

== Rai Libri ==
Rai Libri
- Formerly: Rai Eri (1996–2018); Nuova Eri (1987–1995); Edizioni Radio Italiana (ERI) (1949–1987)
- Industry: Publishing
- Genre: Magazines; Broadcast schedules; Media reports
- Predecessor: URI/RAI
- Founded: 1949; 77 years ago in Turin, Italy
- Headquarters: 18 Via Umberto Novaro, Rome, Italy
- Revenue: 2,360,000,000 euro (2020)
- Number of employees: 12,751 (2021)
- Parent: RAI

Rai Libri is the print publishing arm of RAI. It primarily publish magazines and periodicals for news, entertainment, the broadcast industry, and since its inception, broadcast schedules. Since 1969, it has also published the Dictionary of Orthography and Pronunciation, the largest Italian dictionary of its type.

=== Publishing history ===
RAI's history in print with the Unione Radiofonica Italiana (URI)'s weekly magazine Radio Orario which debuted in January 1925 and became Radiocorriere in 1930. Edizioni Radio Italiana (ERI) was founded in 1949 in Turin, formed entirely from RAI capital to build on Radiocorriere's success. In 1954 primary ownership was split between RAI and Istituto per la Ricostruzione Industriale (IRI). That same year Radiocorriere became Radiocorriere TV, which would continue to be published until RAI divested in 1995.

During the 50s and 60s the ERI published Classe Unica, L'Approdo letterario and L'Approdo Musicale, and in 1969 the first edition of the DOP. The 80s saw the premiere of the monthlies Moda (1983) and King (1987), along with registering a new company name in 1987: Nuova Eri Edizioni Rai-Radiotelevisione Italiana S.p.A., or "Nuova Eri".

Since the 1990s, RAI/ERI has increasingly focused on publishing books written by its own broadcast stars, both in news and entertainment. In 1995 Nuova ERI closed and reopened in 1997 as "Rai Eri". On 15 October 2018, they renamed to "Rai Libri". Rai Libri also edits technical publications: Elettronica e telecomunicazioni since 1946, Nuova rivista musicale italiana since 1967, and Nuova civiltà delle macchine since 1957. It produces its own reports on communications and media, with the second edition of the book-and-documentary RicordeRai released in 2004 in collaboration with Rai Teche.

=== Radiocorriere TV ===
RAI (originally URI) had printed its broadcast schedules nearly without interruption starting in 1925 as Radio Orario, then from 1930 as Radiocorriere, then continuously from 1954 as Radiocorriere TV, until RAI divested in 1995. The magazine was restarted under publisher Rcc edizioni with a print edition from 1999 to 2008, closing due to poor sales. It reopened in 2012 as an online-only publication, with a handful of special-occasion independent print runs in the intervening years, including 2005 (its 80th anniversary), 2010 (switchover to DTTV), and 2011 (150th anniversary of the unification of Italy). The Rai Ufficio Stampa website has published programming schedules and television blurbs online since 2011 under the magazine's name. On 3 January 2014, Rai Teche published online the complete 1925–1995 archives of URI/RAI's Radio Orario/Radiocorriere/TV.

== Headquarters and offices ==
| Seat | Centers of television production | Auditoriums/theatres | Studios |
|---|---|---|---|
| Rome | Centro radiotelevisivo "Biagio Agnes", Saxa Rubra | | 16 |
| Rome | CPTV Via Teulada, 66 | | 9 |
| Rome | CPTV Studi "Fabrizio Frizzi", Via Ettore Romagnoli, 30 | | 6 |
| Rome | Teatro delle Vittorie | 1 theatre | |
| Rome | Auditorium of Foro Italico | 1 auditorium | |
| Milan | CP Corso Sempione, 27 | 3 auditoriums | 5 |
| Milan | CPTV Via Mecenate, 76 | | 4 |
| Naples | CP Viale Marconi, 9 | 1 auditorium | 7 |
| Turin | CP Via Verdi, 16 | 1 auditorium | 6 |

=== Local offices ===
- North-west: Genoa, Saint Christophe
- North-east: Bologna, Bolzano, Trento, Trieste, Venice
- Centre: Ancona, Florence, Perugia, Pescara
- South: Bari, Campobasso, Cosenza, Potenza
- Islands: Cagliari, Palermo

=== Foreign offices ===
There are RAI offices in foreign countries, which produce news reports that are broadcast live in Italy. These offices are in Brussels, Paris, Berlin, London, New York City, Beijing, Cairo, Jerusalem, Nairobi, Moscow, Rio de Janeiro, and Bangkok.

== Finances ==
=== Debt level ===
As March 2015, RAI has a debt of €442 million and the Italian Court of Audit was worried about the size of RAI's debt for the impact that this may have on Italian people, as the company is owned by the state.

=== Mandatory annual fee on all televisions in Italy ===
Italians must purchase an annual television licence for about €90 every year in order to legally own a TV or HDTV. It is known as Canone Rai, "Rai Tax", because it is used to part-fund the RAI. Since 2016, it is financed through the electricity bill.

== Over-the-top media service ==
RaiPlay is RAI's over-the-top media service (OTT). It covers viewers across multiple devices such as computers, tablets, smartphones. The service's website contains all of RAI's radio stations and television channels.

== See also ==
- Television in Italy
- Television licensing in Italy
- Prix Italia
