= Rai Radio 2 =

Italian radio channel

- Italy
- Broadcast area: Italy - National FM, DAB & DVB-T and Satellite

Programming
- Format: Talk, contemporary music

Ownership
- Owner: RAI
- Sister stations: Rai Radio 1, Rai Radio 3, Rai Radio Tutta Italiana, Rai Radio 3 Classica, Rai Isoradio

History
- First air date: 21 March 1938; 88 years ago
- Former names: EIAR (1938–1944); RAI (1944–1945); Rete Rossa (1945–1951); Secondo Programma (1951–1975)

Links
- Webcast: RaiPlay Sound
- Website: RaiPlay Sound

Rai Radio 2 (Radio Due) is an Italian radio channel operated by the state-owned public-broadcasting organization RAI and specializing in talk programmes and popular music.

== History ==
The origins of the channel can be traced back to 21 March 1938, when the EIAR – which was to become Radio Audizioni Italiane (RAI) in 1944 – began transmitting a second, separately programmed radio service in major cities.

Following the end of World War II and reconstruction and improvement of the surviving transmitter network, radio broadcasting was reorganized (with effect from 3 November 1946) to provide two national channels covering most of the country. The first channel was known as the Rete Azzurra (blue network) and the second as the Rete Rossa (red network). These "neutral" names were chosen to imply that, while at any one time each channel aimed to provide programming of a contrasting style to that available on the other, the two channels were nominally equal in status and had an equally wide-ranging remit.

On 1 January 1952, as part of a move aimed at giving each of its channels a more distinctive "personality" – a cultural Terzo Programma (third programme) having already been added on 1 October 1950 – RAI renamed the Rete Rossa as the Secondo Programma (second programme), later to become RAI Radio 2.

== Programmes ==
Rai Radio 2 is among the highest-rated Italian radio stations in terms of audience share.

Viva Radio2, was one of the most famous and successful programs of the channel, it was hosted by the popular comedian and TV/radio personality Fiorello, together with Marco Baldini.

The most popular shows are Il ruggito del coniglio, Caterpillar and 610.

Radio 2, like its sister channels Radio 1 and Radio 3, has its own radio news service (Giornale Radio), known as GR2.

== Logos ==
1991–1994	1994–1997	1997–2000	2000–2010	2010–2015	2015–2017	2017–present
