= Rai Radio 1 =

Italian radio channel

- Italy

Programming
- Format: News/sports/AC

Ownership
- Owner: RAI
- Sister stations: Rai Radio 2, Rai Radio 3, Rai Radio Tutta Italiana, Rai Radio 3 Classica, Rai Isoradio

History
- First air date: 6 October 1924; 101 years ago
- Former names: URI (1924–1927); EIAR (1927–1944); RAI (1944–1946); Rete Azzurra (1946–1951); Programma Nazionale (1951–1975)

Links
- Webcast: RaiPlay Sound
- Website: RaiPlay Sound

Rai Radio 1 (Radio Uno) is an Italian radio channel operated by the state-owned public-broadcasting organisation RAI and specialising in news, sports, talk programmes, and popular music.

== History ==
The channel is the direct descendant of the first radio station to operate in Italy, which began its transmissions from Rome on 6 October 1924. This station, call sign 1-RO, was operated by the privately owned Unione radiofonica italiana (URI). In 1927 this company was absorbed by the state-owned Ente Italiano per le Audizioni Radiofoniche (EIAR) which from that date became the only authorised radio broadcaster in Italy.

The EIAR was renamed Radio Audizioni Italiane (RAI) in 1944 and as part of the reconstruction and improvement of the surviving transmitter network following World War II, radio broadcasting was reorganized (with effect from 3 November 1946) to provide two national channels covering most of the country. The first channel was known as the Rete Azzurra (blue network) and the second as the Rete Rossa (red network). These "neutral" names were chosen to imply that, while at any one time each channel aimed to provide programming of a contrasting style to that available on the other, the two channels were nominally equal in status and had an equally wide-ranging remit.

On 1 January 1952, as part of a move aimed at giving each of its channels a more distinctive "personality" – a cultural Terzo Programma (third programme) having already been added on 1 October 1950 – RAI renamed the Rete Azzurra as the Programma Nazionale (national programme), later to become Radiouno and eventually Rai Radio 1.

== Programmes ==
The channel's main programmes include news/talk shows such as Radio anch'io and sports-related broadcasts – in particular, live coverage of all games played by the Italy national team. Commentaries on Serie A and B football matches are aired live on Tutto il calcio minuto per minuto, one of Radio 1's most popular shows, which has been on the air since 1960.

=== Radio programs for Italian minorities in Slovenia and Croatia ===
From Monday to Saturday from 3:45 pm to 4:45 pm, the Trieste editorial staff broadcasts "L'Ora della Venezia Giulia" a radio program dedicated to the Italian minority present in Slovenian Istria, Rijeka and Dalmatia (Croatia), the only indigenous minority that Italy has outside its borders. The program consists of two events:

News: 15-minute radio news edited by the journalistic editorial staff of TGR Friuli-Venezia Giulia; "Trespassing": daily space, from Monday to Saturday, of current affairs and culture on topics of common interest by the Italian programming structure of the Rai FVG headquarters. On Friday the program is carried out in collaboration with the Popular University of Trieste. On Sundays, from 2.30 pm to 4.00 pm, the programs for linguistic minorities offer spaces dedicated to culture, prose, religion and the columns Books in the North-East, Strade del sacro, Il Pensiero Religious. Added to these is a 15-minute radio news at 3.45pm, Sunday at 3.30pm.

The medium wave radio signal, radiated by the Venezia1 transmitter, was receivable on the 936 kHz frequency throughout the Upper Adriatic basin until 10 September 2022. Now it is offered live on Radio1 on digital terrestrial for smart TV owners, in streaming on the regional Rai website and in free-to-air on the satellite 13.0 ° E Hot Bird 13C frequency 11766.00 MHz polarization V 52 HB9 Europe DVB-S2 8PSK 29900 3/4.

== Logos ==
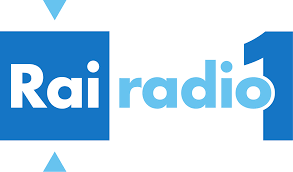
2010-2015	2015–2017	2017–present
