= List of radio stations in Palermo =

The following is a list of licensed FM radio stations in the city of Palermo, Italy sorted by frequency.

| FM frequency (MHz) | Name | Owner | Transmitter position | Description |
|---|---|---|---|---|
| 87.500 | RPM Radio Planet Music | Radio Santa Flavia Centrale Music SRL | Santa Flavia/Contrada Cittadella | |
| 87.700 | Radio Italia Solo Musica Italiana | Radio Italia S.p.A. | Altofonte/Cozzo di Castro | Italian music |
| 88.000 | Radio Spazio Noi InBlu | Associazione Radio Spazio Noi ETS | Palermo/Monte Pellegrino | Relay InBlu |
| 88.300 | Radio Norba | Mediaset | Palermo/Monte Pellegrino | |
| 88.500 | Studio 90 Italia | Studio 90 S.r.l. | Palermo/Monte Pellegrino | Italian music |
| 88.500 | RGS Radio Giornale di Sicilia | Società Editrice Sud | Belmonte Mezzagno/Pizzo Neviera | |
| 88.800 | Dabliu Radio | W-Dabliù Radio Snc | Palermo/Monte Pellegrino | |
| 89.100 | Radio Cuore | Gruppo RMB/Multiradio | Palermo/Monte Pellegrino | Italian music |
| 89.400 | Radio Maria Italia | Associazione Radio Maria | Palermo/Monte Pellegrino | Religious |
| 89.700 | Radio Zeta | RTL 102.5 | Palermo/Monte Pellegrino | |
| 89.900 | Rai Radio 1 Sicilia | RAI | Cesarò/Monte Soro | |
| 90.000 | Radio Monte Carlo | Mediaset | Palermo/Monte Pellegrino | Italian language |
| 90.300 | Rai Gr Parlamento | RAI | Palermo/Monte Pellegrino | Political |
| 90.600 | Radio Musica Italiana | Centro Media S.r.l. | Palermo/Monte Pellegrino | Italian music |
| 90.800 | Radio Margherita | Gruppo Orobello | Cefalù/Cozzo Carbonara | Italian music |
| 90.800 | Radio Arcobaleno | Gruppo Orobello | Palermo/Partanna Mondello (Via Spina Santa) | |
| 91.000 | Radio News | ADN Italia | Palermo/Monte Pellegrino | Oldies music |
| 91.100 | Rai Radio 1 Sicilia | RAI | San Giovanni Gemini/Mount Cammarata | |
| 91.300 | Radio Med | Pubblimed S.p.A. | Palermo/Monte Pellegrino | |
| 91.500 | Virgin Radio Italia | Mediaset | Cefalù/Cozzo Carbonara | Rock Music |
| 91.500 | Canzoni Napoletane | Gruppo Orobello | Misilmeri/Cozzo Bizzolelli | Classical Neapolitan Music |
| 91.600 | Radio Evangelo Misilmeri | Assemblies of God in Italy | Palermo/Monte Pellegrino | Religious |
| 91.800 | RTA Radio Tivù Azzurra | Associazione Start Azzurra S.p.A. | Palermo/Monte Pellegrino (Roccia dello Schiavo) | |
| 91.900 | Rai Radio 2 | RAI | Cesarò/Monte Soro | |
| 92.000 | Radio Radicale | Radical Party | Palermo/Monte Pellegrino | Political |
| 92.300 | Radio Time 90 | Mass Media Produzioni Italia S.r.l. | Palermo/Monte Pellegrino | 90s music |
| 92.600 | Radio Voce della Speranza | Associazione Tele Radio Avventista di Catania | Palermo/Monte Pellegrino | Religious |
| 92.900 | Radio Capital | GEDI Gruppo Editoriale | Palermo/Monte Pellegrino | |
| 93.200 | Virgin Radio Italia | Mediaset | Palermo/Monte Pellegrino | Rock Music |
| 93.500 | Radiofreccia | RTL 102.5 | Palermo/Monte Pellegrino | Rock music |
| 93.700 | Radio Subasio | Mediaset | Palermo/Monte Pellegrino Est | |
| 93.900 | Rai Radio 3 | RAI | Cesarò/Monte Soro | Cultural |
| 94.000 | Radio Time | Mass Media Produzioni Italia S.r.l. | Palermo/Monte Pellegrino | |
| 94.300 | RTA Radio Tivù Azzurra | Associazione Start Azzurra S.p.A. | Santa Flavia/Contrada Cittadella | |
| 94.300 | RGS Radio Giornale di Sicilia | Società Editrice Sud | Palermo/Mondello (Via Marta Bonanno) | |
| 94.600 | Radio LatteMiele | PRS/Centro Media S.r.l. | Palermo/Monte Pellegrino | Italian music |
| 94.900 | Rai Radio 1 Sicilia | RAI | Palermo/Monte Pellegrino | |
| 95.200 | Radio Margherita | Gruppo Orobello | Palermo/Monte Pellegrino | Italian music |
| 95.500 | Radio Battikuore | Pubbli Hit Srl | Palermo/Monte Pellegrino (Roccia dello Schiavo) | |
| 95.500 | Rai Radio 1 Sicilia | RAI | Belmonte Mezzagno/Pizzo Neviera | |
| 95.800 | Radio Cusano Campus | Università degli Studi Niccolò Cusano | Palermo/Monte Pellegrino | |
| 95.900 | Rai Radio 2 | RAI | San Giovanni Gemini/Mount Cammarata | |
| 96.100 | Radio JukeBox | ADN Italia | Palermo/Monte Pellegrino | |
| 96.300 | Radio One | R. & T. S.r.l. | Palermo/Monte Pellegrino | |
| 96.600 | Radio Vela | Radio Vela Agrigento Srl | Bagheria/Monte Giancaldo | |
| 96.900 | Rai Radio 2 | RAI | Palermo/Monte Pellegrino | |
| 97.200 | R101 | Mediaset | Palermo/Monte Pellegrino | |
| 97.400 | Dabliu Radio | W-Dabliù Radio Snc | Palermo/Mondello (Via Monte Ercta) | |
| 97.500 | Radio Norba | Mediaset | Caccamo/Monte Rotondo-Contrada San Rocco | |
| 97.500 | Rai Radio 2 | RAI | Belmonte Mezzagno/Pizzo Neviera | |
| 97.600 | Radio Monte Carlo | Mediaset | Altofonte/Cozzo di Castro | Italian language |
| 97.800 | Radiofreccia | RTL 102.5 | Belmonte Mezzagno/Monte Grifone | Rock music |
| 97.800 | RTL 102.5 | RTL 102.5 | Bagheria/Contrada Consona | |
| 98.100 | Radio Reporter | Radio Reporter Cooperativa A.r.l. | Palermo/Monte Pellegrino (Roccia dello Schiavo) | |
| 98.400 | Rai Isoradio | RAI | Palermo/Monte Pellegrino | Traffic news |
| 98.600 | Radio Mia | Pubbli Hit Srl | Palermo/Monte Pellegrino | |
| 98.900 | Rai Radio 3 | RAI | Palermo/Monte Pellegrino | Cultural |
| 99.200 | RTL 102.5 | RTL 102.5 | Belmonte Mezzagno/Monte Grifone | |
| 99.300 | Radio Spazio Noi InBlu | Associazione Radio Spazio Noi ETS | Santa Flavia/Contrada Cittadella | Relay InBlu |
| 99.500 | Radio Classica | Class Editori | Palermo/Monte Pellegrino | Classical Music |
| 99.500 | Rai Radio 3 | RAI | Belmonte Mezzagno/Pizzo Neviera | Cultural |
| 99.500 | Radio Evangelo Misilmeri | Assemblies of God in Italy | Misilmeri/Contrada Pantaleo | Religious |
| 99.700 | Radio Antenna Borgetto | Associazione Radio Antenna | Palermo/Monte Pellegrino | |
| 99.700 | RBSS RB Stereo Sound | Associazione Culturale Radio R.B. Stereo Sound | Campofelice di Roccella | |
| 99.700 | Radio Castell'Umberto | Discoring Sicilia 2001 S.r.l. | Naso/Contrada Badato | |
| 99.900 | Italia News 24 | ADN Italia | Bagheria/Monte Giancaldo | |
| 99.900 | Rai Radio 3 | RAI | San Giovanni Gemini/Mount Cammarata | Cultural |
| 100.100 | Giornale Radio | LuckyMedia srl | Palermo/Monte Pellegrino | All-news |
| 100.300 | Radio Italia Solo Musica Italiana | Radio Italia S.p.A. | Gratteri/Via San Mamiliano | Italian music |
| 100.500 | Radio Sportiva | Gruppo RMB/Priverno | Palermo/Monte Pellegrino | Sports talk radio |
| 100.700 | Radio Dimensione Suono | RDS | Santa Flavia/Contrada Cittadella | |
| 100.700 | Radio Dimensione Suono | RDS | Palermo/Partanna Mondello (Via Spina Santa) | |
| 100.900 | Radio Evangelica | Chiesa Cristiana Evangelica Internazionale Pentacostale | Palermo/Monte Pellegrino | Religious |
| 101.200 | Radio Italia Anni 60 | Eventi S.r.l. | Palermo/Monte Pellegrino | Oldies music |
| 101.400 | Radio DeeJay | GEDI Gruppo Editoriale | Cefalù/Cozzo Carbonara | |
| 101.600 | Radio 105 | Mediaset | Monreale/Monte Caputo | |
| 101.800 | RTL 102.5 | RTL 102.5 | Marineo/Contrada Costa Zita | |
| 102.000 | Radio In | Radio In Srl | Palermo/Monte Pellegrino | |
| 102.300 | RTL 102.5 | RTL 102.5 | Palermo/Monte Pellegrino | |
| 102.500 | Radio Studio Centro | Due Erre Italia Soc. Coop. | Marineo/Contrada Costa Zita | |
| 102.700 | RGS Radio Giornale di Sicilia | Società Editrice Sud | Palermo/Monte Pellegrino | |
| 103.000 | Radio Kiss Kiss | CN Media S.r.l. | Palermo/Monte Pellegrino | |
| 103.300 | Radio Capital | GEDI Gruppo Editoriale | Palermo/Monte Pellegrino | |
| 103.700 | Radio Arcobaleno | Gruppo Orobello | Palermo/Monte Pellegrino | |
| 104.000 | Radio Margherita | Gruppo Orobello | Belmonte Mezzagno/Monte Grifone | Italian music |
| 104.000 | Radio Marineo Centrale | Radio Marineo Centrale Srl | Marineo/Contrada Costa Zita | |
| 104.300 | Radio Sprint | Radio Sprint S.r.l. | Palermo/Monte Pellegrino (Roccia dello Schiavo) | |
| 104.500 | Radio 24 | Il Sole 24 Ore | Palermo/Monte Pellegrino | All-news and Talk radio |
| 104.800 | Radio Italia Solo Musica Italiana | Radio Italia S.p.A. | Palermo/Monte Pellegrino | Italian music |
| 105.100 | Radio 105 | Mediaset | Palermo/Monte Pellegrino | |
| 105.400 | Radio Maria Italia | Associazione Radio Maria | Monreale/Monte Caputo | Religious |
| 105.700 | Radio Margherita Giovane | Gruppo Orobello | Palermo/Monte Pellegrino | Italian music |
| 106.000 | Radio Margherita | Gruppo Orobello | Palermo/Monte Pellegrino Est | Italian music |
| 106.300 | Radio Spazio Noi InBlu | Associazione Radio Spazio Noi ETS | Palermo/Poggio Ridente | Relay InBlu |
| 106.600 | Radio Dimensione Suono | RDS | Palermo/Monte Pellegrino | |
| 106.900 | Radio Time | Mass Media Produzioni Italia S.r.l. | Monreale/Monte Caputo | |
| 107.200 | Radio Maria Italia | Associazione Radio Maria | Altofonte/Piano di Renda | Religious |
| 107.200 | Radio Maria Italia | Associazione Radio Maria | Cefalù/Cozzo Carbonara | Religious |
| 107.500 | Radio DeeJay | GEDI Gruppo Editoriale | Palermo/Monte Pellegrino | |
| 107.800 | m2o | GEDI Gruppo Editoriale | Palermo/Monte Pellegrino | Dance music |

== See also ==
- List of radio stations in Italy
- List of radio stations in Rome
- List of radio stations in Naples
