= List of radio stations in Italy =

Of all the claimants to the title of the "Father of Radio", the one most associated with it is the Italian inventor Guglielmo Marconi. He was the first person to send radio communication signals in 1895. By 1899 he flashed the first wireless signal across the English Channel and two years later received the letter "S", telegraphed from England to Newfoundland. This was the first successful transatlantic radiotelegraph message in 1902.

Today, radio waves that are broadcast from thousands of stations, along with waves from other sources, fill the air around us continuously. Italy has three state-controlled radio networks that broadcast day and evening hours on both AM and FM. Program content varies from popular music to lectures, panel discussions, as well as frequent newscasts and feature reports. In addition, many private radio stations mix popular and classical music. A short-wave radio, though unnecessary, aids in the reception of VOA, BBC, Vatican Radio in English and the Armed Forces Network in Germany and in other European stations.

Name	Owner	Location	Notes	Transmission	Website
Radio Byoblu libera e indipendente	Byoblu Edizioni S.r.l.s	Worldwide	Public; News/Talk; Popular music	Streaming online	www.byoblu.com/radio
m2o	GEDI Gruppo Editoriale	Rome	Commercial; Electronic dance music	FM, DAB+, DVB-T, DVB-S	www.m2o.it
No Name Radio	RAI	Rome	Public; Independent music;	DAB+, DVB-T, DVB-S	www.raiplaysound.it/nonameradio
R101	Mediaset	Milan	Commercial; Adult Contemporary	FM, DAB+, DVB-T, DVB-S	www.r101.it
Radio 105 Network	Mediaset	Milan	Commercial; Rock, Pop, Hip Hop	FM, DAB+, DVB-T, DVB-S	www.105.net
Radio 24	Il Sole 24 Ore	Milan	Commercial; News/Talk	FM, DAB+, DVB-T, DVB-S	www.radio24.it
Radio Capital	GEDI Gruppo Editoriale	Rome	Commercial; Classic Hits/Adult Contemporary	FM, DAB+, DVB-T, DVB-S	www.capital.it
Radio DeeJay	GEDI Gruppo Editoriale	Milan	Commercial	FM, DAB+, DVB-T, DVB-S	www.deejay.it
Radio Dimensione Suono		Rome	Commercial; It's also called RDS	FM, DAB+, DVB-T, DVB-S	www.rds.it
Radio Freccia		Cologno Monzese (MI)	Commercial; Music rock	FM, DAB+, DVB-T, DVB-S	www.radiofreccia.it
Radio Italia Solo Musica Italiana	Gruppo Radio Italia	Cologno Monzese	Commercial; Italian Hits	FM, DAB+, DVB-T, DVB-S	www.radioitalia.it
Radio Kiss Kiss		Naples	Commercial	FM, DAB+, DVB-T, DVB-S	www.kisskiss.it
Radio Maria	Associazione Radio Maria	Erba(CO)	Community; Catholic	FM, DAB+, DVB-T, DVB-S	www.radiomaria.it
Radio Monte Carlo	Mediaset	Milan	Commercial; It's also called RMC	FM, DAB+, DVB-T, DVB-S	www.radiomontecarlo.net
Radio Popolare	cooperative	Rome	Community; News/Talk	FM DAB+, DVB-S	www.radiopopolare.it
Radio VivaFm	Gruppo Viva S.r.l	Lake Garda	Commercial; Pop, Contemporary	FM, streaming online, DAB+	www.vivafm.it
Radio Radicale	Radical Party	Rome	Community; News/Talk	FM, DAB+, DVB-S	www.radioradicale.it
Radio Risposta web	Centro Evangelico Modenese	Modena	Religious station	streaming online	Radio Risposta Web
Rai Gr Parlamento	RAI	Rome	Public; News/Talk	FM, DVB-S	www.grparlamento.rai.it
Rai Isoradio	RAI	Rome	Public; Traffic and weather news	FM, DAB, DVB-S	www.raiplaysound.it/isoradio
Rai Radio 1	RAI	Rome	Public; News/Talk; Generalist	FM, DAB+, DVB-T, DVB-S	www.raiplaysound.it/radio1
Rai Radio 1 Sport	RAI	Rome	Public; Sport	DAB, DVB-T, DVB-S	www.raiplaysound.it/radio1sport
Rai Radio 2	RAI	Rome	Public; Popular music; Entertainment	FM, DAB, DVB-T, DVB-S	www.raiplaysound.it/radio2
Rai Radio 3	RAI	Rome	Public; Culture; Classical music	FM, DAB, DVB-T, DVB-S	www.raiplaysound.it/radio3
Rai Radio 3 Classica	RAI	Rome	Public; Classical music	DAB, Cable, DVB-T, DVB-S	www.raiplaysound.it/radio3classica
RTL 102.5		Cologno Monzese (MI)	Commercial	FM, DAB+, DVB-S	www.rtl.it
Virgin Radio Italia	Mediaset	Milan	Commercial; Rock	FM, DAB+, DVB-T, DVB-S	http://www.virginradioitaly.it
Rai Radio Kids	RAI	Rome	Public; Children's	DAB, DVB-T, DVB-S	www.raiplaysound.it/radiokids
Rai Radio Techete'	RAI	Rome	Public; Comedy; Drama; Classical music	DAB, DVB-T, DVB-S	www.raiplaysound.it/radiotechete
Rai Radio Tutta Italiana	RAI	Rome	Public; Easy listening music	DAB, Cable, DVB-T, DVB-S	www.raiplaysound.it/radiotuttaitaliana
Rai Radio Live Napoli	RAI	Naples	Public; Music from Naples	DAB, DVB-T, DVB-S	www.raiplaysound.it/radiolivenapoli
Radio Sportiva	Mediahit	Ponsacco (PI) Prato	Commercial; Sport	FM, streaming online, DAB+, DVB-S2	Radio Sportiva
Radio Libertà	Radio Libertà Società Cooperativa	Milan	Community; News/Talk	DAB+, DTT, DVB-S2	Radio Libertà
RadioRadio		Rome	Local; News/Talk	DAB, DVB-S	www.radioradio.it
RTL 102.5 Best		Milan	Commercial; Hot Adult Contemporary	DAB, DVB-S	www.rtl.it
Radio Pianeta		Cividate al piano (BG)	Local; News/Talk	FM	www.radiopianeta.it
Multiradio	Multiradio srl	Tolentino (MC)	Local; Adult Contemporary	FM	www.multiradio.it
Radio Bruno	Radio Bruno	Carpi (MO)	Local; Pop, Contemporary	FM, streaming online, Dvb-T	www.radiobruno.it
Radio Subasio	Radio Subasio S.R.L.Mediaset	Assisi (PG)	Local; Adult Contemporary	FM, DAB+, DVB-S2	Radio Subasio
Radio 23 FEEL THE FLOW	Radio 23 FEEL THE FLOW	Milan (MI)	Italian and International Hip Hop, Rap, Trap	streaming online	www.radio23.it
Radio Zeta		Cologno Monzese (MI)	Commercial; Music Rock and Pop	FM, DAB+, streaming online, DVB-T, DVB-S	www.radiozeta.it

== See also ==
- List of radio stations in Turin
- List of radio stations in Rome
- List of radio stations in Naples
- List of Italian-language radio stations
- List of European medium wave transmitters
- Media of Italy
- List of newspapers in Italy
- List of magazines published in Italy
- Television in Italy
- List of television channels in Italy
- History of Italian journalism
- Censorship in Italy
- Telecommunications in Italy
- Internet in Italy
