= Telecommunications in Italy =

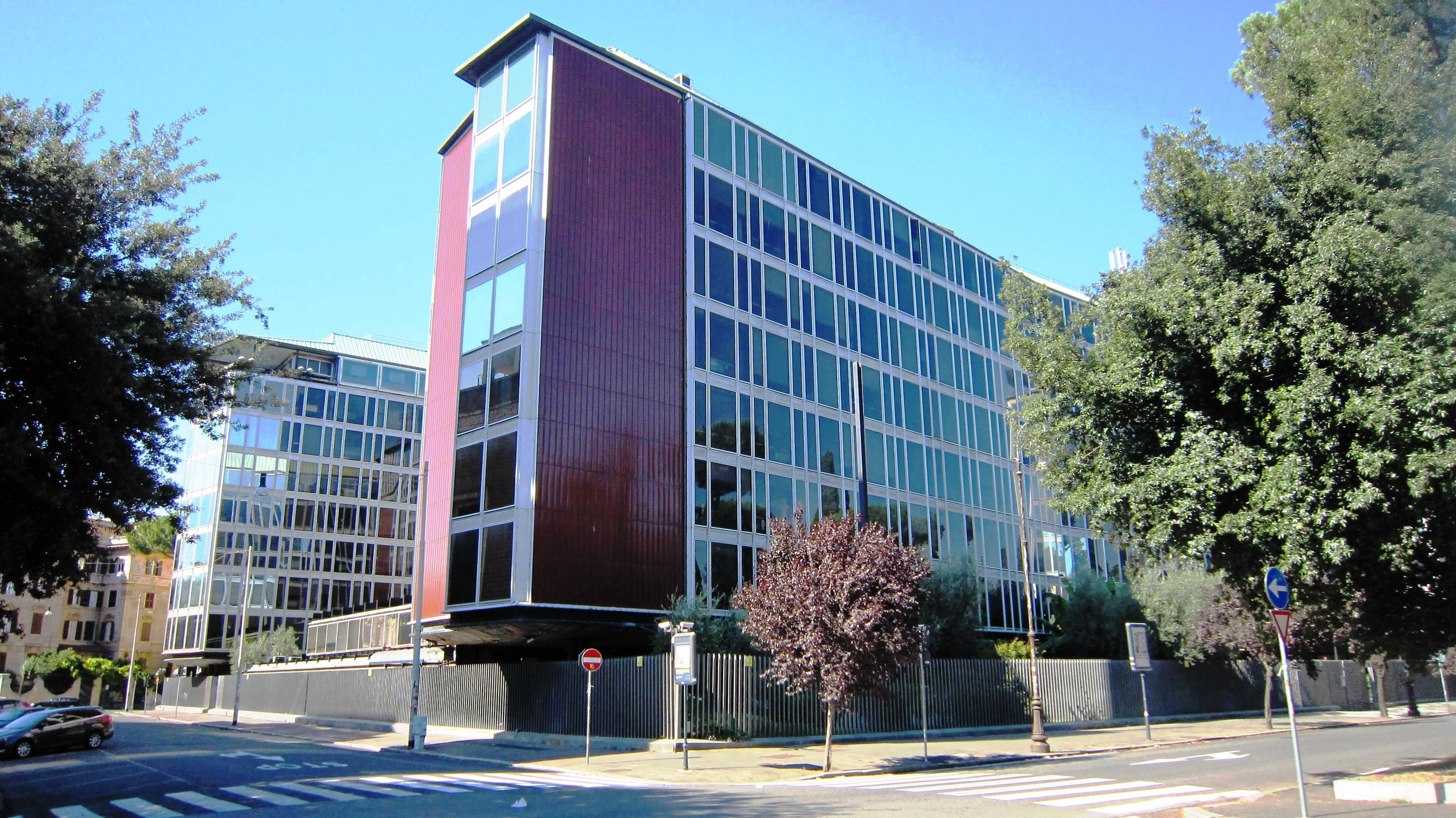
RAI headquarters in Rome

The most important telecommunications in Italy are telephone, radio, television and the Internet.

== Telephone companies ==
- Acantho
- Aexis
- Alcotek
- Alltre
- Incu
- Lars
- AT3
- Hybrid (only in Bergamo)
- Blu
- Brennercom (coverage only in South Tyrol, Trentino and Northern Italy)
- BT
- Budget Telecom
- Cdc 1085
- ClickTel
- Colt Telecom
- Digitel
- EasyTel
- EcsNet
- Elemedia
- Elitel
- Energit
- Eurotime Communication
- Eutelia
- Fastweb
- FreeLine
- ho-mobile
- Iliad
- Intred
- Kena Mobile
- Leadercom
- Linkem
- LTS (coverage in Sicily)
- Messagenet
- Millecom
- Mobaila
- Momax
- Nodalis
- Noicom
- OlimonTel
- Orobiacom
- Plugit
- Selet Telecomunicazioni
- Tag Comunicazioni
- TIM
- Tibis Communication
- Tiscali
- Unidata
- Very Mobile
- Vodafone
- Wind Tre

== Radio stations ==
Radio stations in Italy
Name	Owner	Location	Notes	Transmission	Website
Radio Byoblu libera e indipendente	Byoblu Edizioni S.r.l.s	Worldwide	Public; News/Talk; Popular music	Streaming online	www.byoblu.com/radio
m2o	Elemedia	Rome	Commercial; Electronic dance music	FM, DAB, DAB+, DVB-T, DVB-S	www.m2o.it
R101	Mediaset	Milan	Commercial; Adult Contemporary	FM, DAB, DAB+, DVB-S	www.r101.it
Radio 105 Network	Mediaset	Milan	Commercial; Rock, Pop, Hip-Hop	FM, DVB-S	www.105.net
Radio 24	Il Sole 24 Ore	Milan	Commercial; News/Talk	FM, DAB, DVB-S	www.radio24.it
Radio Capital	Elemedia	Rome	Commercial; Classic Hits/Adult Contemporary	FM, DAB, DVB-T, DVB-S	www.capital.it
Radio DeeJay	Elemedia	Milan	Commercial	FM, DAB, DAB+, DVB-T, DVB-S	www.deejay.it
Radio Dimensione Suono		Rome	Commercial; It's also called RDS	FM, DAB, DAB+, DVB-S	www.rds.it
Radio Italia Solo Musica Italiana	Gruppo Radio Italia	Cologno Monzese	Commercial; Italian Hits	FM, DAB, DVB-S	www.radioitalia.it
Radio Kiss Kiss		Naples	Commercial	FM, DVB-S	www.kisskiss.it
Radio Maria	Associazione Radio Maria	Erba(CO)	Community; Catholic	FM, DAB, DVB-S	www.radiomaria.it
Radio Monte Carlo	Mediaset	Milan	Commercial; It's also called RMC	FM, DVB-S	www.radiomontecarlo.net
Radio Popolare	cooperative	Rome	Community; News/Talk	FM	www.radiopopolare.it
Radio Radicale	Radical Party	Rome	Community; News/Talk	FM, DAB, DVB-S	www.radioradicale.it
Rai Gr Parlamento	RAI	Rome	Public; News/Talk	FM, DVB-S	www.grparlamento.rai.it
Rai Isoradio	RAI		Public; Traffic and weather news	FM, DAB, DVB-S	www.isoradio.rai.it
Rai Radio 1	RAI	Rome	Public; News/Talk; Generalist	FM, MW, DAB, DVB-T, DVB-S	www.raiplayradio.it/radio1
Rai Radio 2	RAI	Rome	Public; Popular music; Entertainment	FM, DAB, DVB-T, DVB-S	www.raiplayradio.it/radio2
Rai Radio 3	RAI	Rome	Public; Culture; Classical music	FM, DAB, DVB-T, DVB-S	www.raiplayradio.it/radio3
RTL 102.5		Cologno Monzese (MI)	Commercial	FM, DAB, DVB-S	www.rtl.it
Virgin Radio Italia	Mediaset	Milan	Commercial; Rock	FM, DAB, DAB+, DVB-S	http://www.virginradioitaly.it
Rai Radio Tutta Italiana	RAI	Rome	Public; Easy listening music	DAB, Cable, DVB-T, DVB-S	www.raiplayradio.it/radiotuttaitaliana
Rai Radio 3 Classica	RAI	Rome	Public; Classical music	DAB, Cable, DVB-T, DVB-S	www.raiplayradio.it/radioclassica
Radio Padania Libera	Lega Nord	Varese	Community; News/Talk	DAB, DVB-S	www.radiopadania.info

== Television channels ==
See also: RAI § TV channels

=== RAI – national ===
==== In high definition and ultra definition ====
RAI Terrestrial channels
Logo	Name	Type	Launched	Description
	Rai 1	Free-to-air	3 January 1954	Generalist and family-oriented
	Rai 2	Free-to-air	4 November 1961	Generalist, catering towards urban audiences
	Rai 3	Free-to-air	15 December 1979	Cultural and regional programming
	Rai 4	Free-to-air	14 July 2008	Youth/urban programming and movies
	Rai 5	Free-to-air	26 November 2010	Arts and culture programming
	Rai 4K	Free-to-air	17 June 2016	Ultra-high-definition (4K) channel
	Rai Movie	Free-to-air	1 July 1999	Movies
	Rai Premium	Free-to-air	31 July 2003	Popular fiction and films
	Rai Gulp	Free-to-air	1 June 2007	Shows aimed at young children ages 8–14
	Rai Yoyo	Free-to-air	1 November 2006	Shows aimed at young children ages 4–7
	Rai News 24	Free-to-air	26 April 1999	Non-stop rolling news
	Rai Storia	Free-to-air	2 February 2009	Documentaries about history and culture
	Rai Sport	Free-to-air	14 September 2015	Sports coverage and related news
	Italiana	Free-to-air	1 October 2026	Documentary, cultural and cuisine

=== RAI – regional ===
Logo	Name	Launched	Language	Region
	Rai Alto Adige	1960	Italian	Trentino-Alto Adige/Südtirol
	Rai Ladinia	1988	Ladin	Trentino-Alto Adige/Südtirol
	Rai Südtirol	1966	German	Trentino-Alto Adige/Südtirol
	Rai 3 BIS FJK	1995	Italian and Slovene	Friuli Venezia Giulia/Furlanija Julijska Krajina

=== Mediaset ===
See also: Mediaset

Mediaset Terrestrial channels
Logo	Name	Type	Launched	Description
	Rete 4	Free-to-air	4 January 1982	General, High-definition
	Canale 5	Free-to-air	11 November 1980	General, High-definition
	Italia 1	Free-to-air	3 January 1982	General, High-definition
	20	Free-to-air	3 April 2018	TV Series and Sports
	Iris	Free-to-air	30 November 2007	Movies
	Twentyseven	Free-to-air	17 January 2022	Cinema
	La5	Free-to-air	12 March 2010	Entertainment and Lifestyle
	Cine34	Free-to-air	20 January 2020	Cinema
	Focus	Free-to-air	17 March 2018	Documentaries
	Top Crime	Free-to-air	1 June 2013	Entertainment
	Italia 2	Free-to-air	4 July 2011	Entertainment and Sports
	TGcom24	Free-to-air	28 November 2011	News
	Mediaset Extra	Free-to-air	26 November 2010	General

== Internet ==
The Internet country code top-level domain (ccTLD) for Italy is .it and is sponsored by National Research Council. The .eu domain is also used, as it is shared with other European Union member states. Currently Internet access is available to businesses and home users in various forms, including dial-up, fiber, cable, DSL and wireless.

According to netindex.com, the Italian average for fixed connections is below the global average (96.98 Mbit/s download and 51.28 Mbit/s Up) with an average speed of 79.62 Mbit/s download and 31.41 Mbit/s in upload.

== Statistics ==
- Telephones - main lines in use: 19.52 million (2019)
- Telephones - mobile cellular: 79.48 million (2019)
- Telephone system: well-developed, fully automated telephone and data services
  - domestic: high-capacity cable and microwave radio relay trunks
  - international: satellite Earth stations - 3 Intelsat (with a total of 5 antennas - 3 for Atlantic Ocean and 2 for Indian Ocean), 1 Inmarsat (Atlantic Ocean region), and NA Eutelsat; 21 submarine cables.
- Radio broadcast stations: AM about 100, FM about 4,600, shortwave 9 (1998)
- Radios: 50.5 million (1997)
- Television broadcast stations: 358 (plus 4,728 repeaters) (1995)
- Televisions: 30.5 million (1997)
- Internet hosts: 22.152 million (2009)
- Internet users: 24.992 million (2008)
- Country code (Top-level domain): .it

== See also ==
- Media of Italy
