= List of radio stations in Rome =

The first Medium wave radio station in Rome was launched on 6 October 1924 by URI. The first Shortwave radio station in Rome was launched in 1930 by URI. After the 8 September 1943 was opened Radio Roma. The first private radio station in Rome was GBR, launched in 1974 and after Radio Dimensione Suono in 1976.

The following is a list of licensed FM radio stations in the city of Rome, Italy and are sorted by their frequencies.

FM frequency (MHz)	Name	Owner	Transmitter position	Description
87.600	Rai Radio 1 Lazio	RAI	Rocca di Papa/Monte Cavo (Costarelle)	
87.900	Radio Onda Rossa		Rocca di Papa/Monte Cavo	
88.100	Radio Laziale	Università degli Studi Niccolò Cusano	Rocca di Papa/Monte Cavo	Sports talk radio
88.300	Radio Freccia	RTL 102.5	Rocca di Papa (Madonna del Tufo)	Rock music
88.600	Radio Radicale	Radical Party	Rocca di Papa/Monte Cavo	Political
88.900	Radio Zeta	RTL 102.5	Rocca di Papa/Monte Cavo	
89.100	Radio Cusano Campus	Università degli Studi Niccolò Cusano	Rocca di Papa/Monte Cavo	
89.300	Lazio Style Radio		Rocca di Papa/Monte Cavo	Sports talk radio
89.500	Radio Norba	Mediaset	Rocca di Papa/Monte Cavo	
89.700	Rai Radio 1 Lazio	RAI	Rome/Monte Mario	
89.900	Radio Gamma Stereo		Norma	Pop, oldies
90.000	Radio Roma Sound		Monte Porzio Catone	
90.000	Radio Maria Italia	Associazione Radio Maria	Genzano di Roma	Religious
90.100	Radio DeeJay	GEDI Gruppo Editoriale	Configni/Monte Cosce	
90.300	Radio DeeJay	GEDI Gruppo Editoriale	Rocca di Papa/Monte Cavo	
90.500	Radio Capital	GEDI Gruppo Editoriale	Rocca di Papa/Monte Cavo (Strada Comunale - Monte Cavo Campagna)	
90.700	Radio Olympia		Rocca di Papa/Villa Romita	Sports talk radio
90.900	Radio Manà Manà Sport Roma	Università degli Studi Niccolò Cusano	Rocca di Papa/Monte Cavo	Sports talk radio
91.000	Radio Dimensione Suono		Tivoli	
91.200	Rai Radio 2	RAI	Rocca di Papa/Monte Cavo (Costarelle)	
91.400	Radio Italia Solo Musica Italiana		Segni	Italian music
91.500	RTL 102.5	RTL 102.5	Rome/Monte Mario	
91.700	Rai Radio 2	RAI	Rome/Monte Mario	
92.000	R101	Mediaset	Palombara Sabina/Monte Gennaro	
92.200	RTL 102.5	RTL 102.5	Palombara Sabina/Monte Gennaro	
92.200	Radio Freccia	RTL 102.5	Rieti/Frazione Campoforogna-Monte Terminillo	Rock Music
92.400	RTL 102.5	RTL 102.5	Rocca di Papa/Monte Cavo	
92.700	Teleradiostereo		Rocca di Papa/Via Ariccia	Sports talk radio
92.900	Spazio Radio		Rome/Casilina	
93.000	Radio Roma Capitale	Gruppo Roma Radio	Palombara Sabina/Monte Gennaro	
93.200	Radio Quattro		Rome/Via Del Mascherino	
93.300	Radio Zeta	RTL 102.5	Vatican City/Palazzina Leone XIII	
93.400	Radio Zeta	RTL 102.5	Monte Soratte	
93.500	Radio Mater		Rome/Via Massimi	Religious
93.500	Radiofreccia	RTL 102.5	Rome/Via Luigi Maria Arconati	Rock music
93.700	Rai Radio 3	RAI	Rome/Monte Mario	Cultural
94.000	Radio Subasio	Mediaset	Palombara Sabina/Monte Gennaro	
94.200	Virgin Radio Italia	Mediaset	Albano Laziale/Via dei Cappuccini	Rock music
94.300	Radio Subasio	Mediaset	Monte Soratte	
94.500	Radio Subasio	Mediaset	Rocca di Papa/Monte Cavo	
94.800	Radio Maria Italia	Associazione Radio Maria	Rocca di Papa/Monte Cavo	Religious
95.100	Radio Maria Italia	Associazione Radio Maria	Monte Compatri	Religious
95.300	Giornale Radio		Frascati/Villa Tuscolana	All-news
95.500	Radio Capital	GEDI Gruppo Editoriale	Rocca di Papa/Monte Cavo (Costarelle)	
95.800	m2o	GEDI Gruppo Editoriale	Rome/Monte Mario	Dance music
96.100	Radio 105	Mediaset	Rocca di Papa/Monte Cavo	
96.300	Radio inBlu	Conferenza Episcopale Italiana	Vatican City/Palazzina Leone XIII	
96.500	Radio 105	Mediaset	Rome/Monte Mario	
96.600	Radio 105	Mediaset	Rome/Piazza Certaldo	
96.600	Radio Rock Italia		Rome/Via Luigi Maria Arconati	Italian Rock Music
96.800	RID 96.8		Rocca di Papa/Monte Cavo	
97.000	m2o	GEDI Gruppo Editoriale	Monte Compatri	Dance music
97.200	Radio Kiss Kiss		Monte Compatri	
97.500	Radio Italia Solo Musica Italiana		Frascati/Villa Tuscolana	Italian music
97.700	Radio Romanista	Radio Globo	Rocca di Papa/Monte Cavo	Sports talk radio
97.900	Radio Kiss Kiss		Rocca di Papa/Monte Cavo (Costarelle)	
98.100	Radio Sei	Gruppo Roma Radio	Rocca di Papa/Monte Cavo	Sports talk radio
98.400	Rai Radio 3	RAI	Rocca di Papa/Monte Cavo (Costarelle)	Cultural
98.500	RTR 99		Rieti/Frazione Campoforogna-Monte Terminillo	Oldies music
98.700	Virgin Radio Italia	Mediaset	Frascati/Villa Tuscolana	Rock music
99.000	RTR 99		Rocca di Papa (Madonna del Tufo)	Oldies music
99.200	Simply Radio		Albano Laziale/Fauno del Bosco	
99.400	Rai GR Parlamento	RAI	Rocca di Papa/Monte Cavo (Costarelle)	Political
99.600	Radio Globo		Rocca di Papa/Monte Cavo	
99.800	Radio Core de' Roma		Rocca di Papa/Monte Cavo (Costarelle)	
100.000	R101	Mediaset	Rocca di Papa/Monte Cavo	
100.300	Rai Radio 3 Classica	RAI	Rome/Monte Mario	Classical music
100.500	Strike Radio		Monte Porzio Catone	
100.700	Radio Globo Vintage	Radio Globo	Rocca di Papa/Monte Cavo	Oldies music
101.000	Radio DeeJay	GEDI Gruppo Editoriale	Rocca di Papa/Monte Cavo (Costarelle)	
101.300	Radio Birikina	Zanella Holding	Rocca di Papa/Monte Cavo	
101.500	Radio Bruno	Multiradio	Rocca di Papa/Monte Cavo	
101.700	Radio Evangelo Roma	Assemblies of God in Italy	Rocca di Papa/Monte Cavo	Religious
101.900	Dimensione Suono Roma	RDS	Rocca di Papa/Monte Cavo	
102.100	Radio Freccia	RTL 102.5	Palombara Sabina/Monte Gennaro	Rock music
102.300	Radio Roma		Palombara Sabina/Monte Gennaro	
102.400	Radio Radicale	Radical Party	Rome/Monte Mario	Political
102.700	RAM Power		Monte Compatri	
103.000	Radio Dimensione Suono	RDS	Rocca di Papa/Monte Cavo	
103.300	Radio News	ADN Italia	Frascati/Villa Tuscolana	
103.300	Rai Isoradio	RAI	A1 – Autogrill Ferronia Ovest	Traffic info
103.500	Rai Isoradio	RAI	Rocca di Papa/Monte Cavo (Costarelle)	
103.700	Radio Subasio	Mediaset	Calvi dell'Umbria/Monte San Pancrazio	
103.800	Radio Vaticana 105 Live	Vatican City	Vatican City/Palazzina Leone XIII	Religious
104.000	Radio Roma		Monte Compatri	
104.200	Rete Sport	Gruppo Roma Radio	Monte Compatri	Sports talk radio
104.500	Radio Radio		Palombara Sabina/Monte Gennaro	Talk radio
104.800	Radio Voce della Speranza		Rocca di Papa/Monte Cavo	Religious
105.000	Radio Vaticana 105 Live	Vatican City	Vatican City/Palazzina Leone XIII	Religious
105.300	Dimensione Suono Soft	RDS	Rocca di Papa/Monte Cavo	
105.500	Radio Subasio	Mediaset	Serrone/Monte Scalambra	
105.600	Radio Italia Solo Musica Italiana		Rocca di Papa (Madonna del Tufo)	Italian music
105.800	Radio Sportiva	Radio Incontro/Priverno	Rocca di Papa/Monte Cavo	Sports talk radio
106.100	Radio Monte Carlo	Mediaset	Frascati/Villa Tuscolana	Italian language
106.300	Radio Monte Carlo	Mediaset	Rocca di Papa/Monte Cavo	Italian language
106.600	Radio Rock		Rocca di Papa/Monte Cavo	Rock music
106.900	Radio Mambo		Rocca di Papa/Monte Cavo	Latin Music
107.100	Antenna Uno		Rocca di Papa/Monte Cavo	
107.400	Radio 105	Mediaset	Palombara Sabina/Monte Gennaro	
107.600	Radio Italia Anni 60		Monte Compatri	Oldies
107.900	Radio 24	Il Sole 24 Ore	Rocca di Papa/Monte Cavo	All-news and Talk radio

== See also ==
- List of radio stations in Italy
- List of radio stations in Turin
- List of radio stations in Naples
