= List of radio stations in Turin =

The following is a list of licensed FM radio stations in the city of Turin, Italy sorted by frequency.

FM frequency (MHz)	Name	Owner	Transmitter position	Description
87.600	Radio Frejus		Colle della Maddalena	
87.800	RBE-Radio Beckwith Evangelica		Rocca Berra	
88.000	Radio Dora		Colle della Maddalena	
88.200	Rai GR Parlamento	RAI	Eremo	Political
88.500	TOradio		Colle della Maddalena	
88.700	Radio Margherita	Gruppo Orobello	Colle della Maddalena	Italian music
89.000	Radio Party Groove	Fast Media	Colle della Maddalena	House music
89.300	Radio Fantastica Piemonte	Fast Media	Colle della Maddalena	
89.500	Radio Fantastica Piemonte	Fast Media	Montoso	
89.700	Radio GRP 2 Melody	GRP Giornale Radio Piemonte	Colle della Maddalena	
90.000	Radio Torino International		Superga	Romanian language
90.300	Radio Capital	GEDI Gruppo Editoriale	Colle della Maddalena	
90.500	Radio DeeJay	GEDI Gruppo Editoriale	Montoso	
90.700	RTL 102.5		Bossola	
90.900	Radiofreccia	RTL 102.5	Colle della Maddalena	Rock music
91.200	Radio Subasio	Mediaset	Colle della Maddalena	
91.500	Radio Evangelo Piemonte	Assemblies of God in Italy	Colle della Maddalena	Religious
91.800	Radio Margherita	Gruppo Orobello	Superga	Italian music
92.100	Rai Radio 1 Piemonte	RAI	Eremo	
92.400	Radio Kiss Kiss		Eremo	
92.700	Radio Bruno	Multiradio	Colle della Maddalena	
93.000	m2o	GEDI Gruppo Editoriale	Colle della Maddalena	Dance music
93.300	Radio News	ADN Italia	Colle della Maddalena	
93.600	Radio Birikina	Zanella Holding	Colle della Maddalena	
93.900	Radio Energy		Colle della Maddalena	
94.200	Radio Ricordi	ADN Italia/RCM Radio Città e Musica	Moncalieri	Italian oldies music
94.400	Radio Juke Box	ADN Italia/RCM Radio Città e Musica	Colle della Maddalena	
94.700	Virgin Radio Italia	Mediaset	Colle della Maddalena	Rock Music
95.000	Radio Manila	Fast Media	Colle della Maddalena	
95.300	Radio Torino	Fast Media	Colle della Maddalena	
95.600	Rai Radio 2	RAI	Eremo	
95.900	Radio Zeta	RTL 102.5	Colle della Maddalena	
96.200	Radio Dimensione Suono	RDS	Colle della Maddalena	
96.400	Discoradio	Ritzland Records	Corio Canavese/Frazione San Bernardo	Dance music
96.700	Radio Gran Paradiso		Monte Quinzeina	
97.000	Radio Italia Anni 60		Colle della Maddalena	Oldies music
97.300	Radio Capital	GEDI Gruppo Editoriale	Corio Canavese	
97.600	Radio Italia 1	Fast Media	Colle della Maddalena	
97.900	Radio Torino Biblica		Colle della Maddalena	Religious
98.200	Rai Radio 3	RAI	Eremo	Cultural
98.500	Radio Nostalgia	Radio Number One	Colle della Maddalena	Oldies music
98.700	Radio Classica	Class Editori	Colle della Maddalena	Classical music
99.000	Discoradio	Ritzland Records	Eremo	Dance music
99.300	Radio GRP		Superga	
99.600	Radio 105	Mediaset	Colle della Maddalena	
99.900	Radio Nanè		Superga	
100.200	Radio Shake Hit	Fast Media	Colle della Maddalena	Dance music
100.500	Radio GRP 3	GRP Giornale Radio Piemonte	Superga	
100.800	Party Radio	Fast Media	Colle della Maddalena	Oldies music
101.000	R101	Mediaset	Colle della Maddalena	
101.200	Radio LatteMiele	PRS/Fast Media	Colle della Maddalena	Italian music
101.500	Radio OneDance	Radio Number One	Colle della Maddalena	Dance music
101.800	Rai Radio 3 Classica	RAI	Eremo	Classical Music
102.100	RTL 102.5		Colle della Maddalena	
102.300	RTL 102.5		Moncalieri/Strada Della Valle	
102.500	RTL 102.5		Corio/Frazione San Bernardo-Strada vicinale del Bandito	
102.800	Radio Radicale	Radical Party	Superga	Political
103.100	Radio Dimensione Suono	RDS	Eremo	
103.300	Rai Isoradio	RAI	Eremo	Traffic news
103.500	Radio Cusano Campus	Università degli Studi Niccolò Cusano	Colle della Maddalena	
103.700	Radio Sportiva	Priverno	Colle della Maddalena	Sports talk radio
104.000	Radio Number One		Corio Canavese/Strada del Bandito	
104.200	Radio Number One		Colle della Maddalena	
104.400	Radio Dimensione Suono	RDS	Corio Canavese/Frazione San Bernardo	
104.600	Radio Antenna 1		Moncalieri/Strada Moncalvo	
104.700	Radio Antenna 1		Colle della Maddalena	
105.000	Radio 24	Il Sole 24 Ore	Colle della Maddalena	All-news and Talk radio
105.250	Radio BlackOut		Colle della Maddalena	
105.500	Radio Monte Carlo	Mediaset	Colle della Maddalena	Italian language
105.710	Radio Mater		Colle della Maddalena	Religious
105.900	Radio 105	Mediaset	Bielmonte	
106.000	Radiofreccia	RTL 102.5	Colle della Maddalena	Rock music
106.300	Radio Italia Solo Musica Italiana		Colle della Maddalena	Italian music
106.600	Radio Italia Solo Musica Italiana		Corio Canavese/Strada del Bandito	Italian music
106.900	Radio DeeJay	GEDI Gruppo Editoriale	Colle della Maddalena	
107.100	Radio DeeJay	GEDI Gruppo Editoriale	Corio Canavese/Strada del Bandito	
107.400	Radio Nichelino Comunità-InBlu	Fast Media	Colle della Maddalena	Relay InBlu
107.700	Radio Maria Italia	Associazione Radio Maria	Colle della Maddalena	Religious
107.900	Radio Maria Italia	Associazione Radio Maria	Prarostino/Borgata Castelletto	Religious

== See also ==
- List of radio stations in Italy
- List of radio stations in Rome
- List of radio stations in Naples
