= List of radio stations in Naples =

The following is a list of licensed FM radio stations in the city of Naples, Italy, sorted by frequency.

FM frequency (MHz)	Name	Owner	Transmitter position	Description
87.500	Radio Italia Solo Musica Italiana		Ercolano/Mount Vesuvius/Vesuvius Observatory	Italian music
87.600	Radio Italia Solo Musica Italiana		Vico Equense/Monte Faito	Italian music
87.700	Radio Più		Ercolano/Mount Vesuvius/Vesuvius Observatory	
87.900	RCS Network		Ercolano/Mount Vesuvius/Vesuvius Observatory	
88.000	m2o	GEDI Gruppo Editoriale	Naples/Camaldolilli	Dance music
88.100	Radio Capri		Anacapri	
88.200	Radio 105	Mediaset	Naples/Camaldoli	
88.200	Radio 105	Mediaset	Vico Equense/Monte Faito	
88.400	Radio LatteMiele	PRS	Ercolano/Mount Vesuvius/Vesuvius Observatory	Italian music
88.600	RCS Network		Vico Equense/Monte Faito	
88.800	Radio Napoli	Radio Kiss Kiss	Naples/Camaldoli	Neapolitan music
89.000	Radio Kiss Kiss		Naples/Camaldoli	
89.300	Rai Radio 1 Campania	RAI	Naples/Camaldoli	
89.500	Radio Centro Campania		Ercolano/Mount Vesuvius/Vesuvius Observatory	Neapolitan music
89.600	Radio DeeJay	GEDI Gruppo Editoriale	Vico Equense/Monte Faito	
89.800	Radio Dimensione Suono	RDS	Naples/Camaldoli	
89.850	New Radio Network		Casertavecchia	
90.050	Radio Maria Italia	Associazione Radio Maria	Vico Equense/Monte Faito	Religious
90.200	Radio Maria Italia	Associazione Radio Maria	Ercolano/Mount Vesuvius/Eremo	Religious
90.500	Radio Dimensione Suono	RDS	Ercolano/Mount Vesuvius/Vesuvius Observatory	
90.800	Radio Sportiva	Priverno/Sagittarius	Ercolano/Mount Vesuvius/Vesuvius Observatory	Sports talk radio
91.000	Rai GR Parlamento	RAI	Vico Equense/Monte Faito	
91.200	Radio Maria Italia	Associazione Radio Maria	Tramonti/Monte Sant'Angelo	Religious
91.300	Rai Radio 2	RAI	Naples/Camaldoli	
91.600	Radio Monte Carlo	Mediaset	Vico Equense/Monte Faito	Italian language
91.900	Radio Maria Italia	Associazione Radio Maria	Naples/Camaldoli	Religious
92.100	Radiofreccia	RTL 102.5	Naples/Via Leonardo Bianchi	Rock music
92.250	Radio DeeJay	GEDI Gruppo Editoriale	Naples/Camaldolilli	
92.500	Radio Norba	Mediaset	Naples/Camaldolilli	
92.500	Radio Sant'Anna		Lettere	Neapolitan music
92.700	Radio Norba	Mediaset	Vico Equense/Monte Faito	
93.000	R101	Mediaset	Naples/Camaldoli	
93.300	Rai Radio 3	RAI	Naples/Camaldoli	Cultural
93.500	Virgin Radio Italia	Mediaset	Naples/Camaldoli	Rock music
93.500	Virgin Radio Italia	Mediaset	Vico Equense/Monte Faito	Rock music
93.700	Virgin Radio Italia	Mediaset	Ercolano/Mount Vesuvius/Vesuvius Observatory	Rock music
93.900	Radio Club 91		Ercolano/Mount Vesuvius/Vesuvius Observatory	
93.900	Radio Club 91		Vico Equense/Monte Faito	
94.100	Rai Radio 1 Campania	RAI	Vico Equense/Monte Faito	
94.300	Radio Club 91		Naples/Via Camaldolilli	
94.600	Kiss Kiss Italia	Radio Kiss Kiss	Naples/Camaldoli	Italian music
94.800	Radio Ibiza	Radio Kiss Kiss	Ercolano/Mount Vesuvius/Vesuvius Observatory	Club music
94.850	Radio Antenna 2		Vico Equense/Monte Faito	Italian music
95.000	Radio Punto Nuovo		Naples/Via Camaldolilli	
95.000	Radio Kolbe InBlu		Naples/Chiesa San Lorenzo Maggiore	Religious
95.200	Radiofreccia	RTL 102.5	Vico Equense/Monte Faito	Rock music
95.400	Radio Zeta	RTL 102.5	Vico Equense/Monte Faito	
95.600	Radio Marte		Ercolano/Mount Vesuvius/Vesuvius Observatory	
95.900	Kiss Kiss Italia		Vico Equense/Monte Faito	Italian music
96.100	Rai Radio 2	RAI	Vico Equense/Monte Faito	
96.300	1 Station Radio		Vico Equense/Monte Faito	Dance music
96.400	Radio Margherita		Ercolano/Mount Vesuvius/Vesuvius Observatory	Italian music
96.600	R101	Mediaset	Ercolano/Mount Vesuvius/Vesuvius Observatory	
96.800	Radio Italia Solo Musica Italiana		Naples/Camaldolilli	Italian music
96.800	Radio Italia Solo Musica Italiana		Vico Equense/Monte Faito	Italian music
97.000	Radio Kiss Kiss		Vico Equense/Monte Faito	
97.300	AFN Napoli-The Eagle	AFN	Naples/Camaldoli	English language
97.500	Radio Ibiza	Radio Kiss Kiss	Vico Equense/Monte Faito	Club music
97.500	Radio Radicale	Radical Party	Casertavecchia	Political
97.700	Radio Marte		Naples/Camaldoli	
97.800	Onda Verde		Lettere	Neapolitan music
97.900	Radio Marte		Naples/Camaldolilli	
98.000	Radio Ibiza		Casertavecchia	Club music
98.100	Rai Radio 3	RAI	Vico Equense/Monte Faito	Cultural
98.300	m2o	GEDI Gruppo Editoriale	Ercolano/Mount Vesuvius/Vesuvius Observatory	Dance music
98.600	Radio Monte Carlo	Mediaset	Vico Equense/Monte Faito	Italian language
98.800	Radio Nuova San Giorgio		Ercolano/Mount Vesuvius/Vesuvius Observatory	Neapolitan music
99.000	Radio Punto Nuovo		Ercolano/Mount Vesuvius/Vesuvius Observatory	
99.000	Radio Punto Nuovo		Vico Equense/Monte Faito	
99.200	Kiss Kiss Napoli	Radio Kiss Kiss	Ercolano/Mount Vesuvius/Vesuvius Observatory	
99.200	Kiss Kiss Napoli	Radio Kiss Kiss	Vico Equense/Monte Faito	
99.500	Radio DeeJay	GEDI Gruppo Editoriale	Ercolano/Mount Vesuvius/Vesuvius Observatory	
99.700	Radio 105	Mediaset	Ercolano/Mount Vesuvius/Vesuvius Observatory	
100.000	Radio Capri		Naples/Camaldoli	
100.250	Radio Subasio	Mediaset	Vico Equense/Monte Faito	
100.500	Radio CRC		Ercolano/Mount Vesuvius/Vesuvius Observatory	
100.700	Radio Margherita		Naples/Camaldoli	Italian music
100.700	Radio Margherita		Vico Equense/Monte Faito	Italian music
100.950	Rai GR Parlamento	RAI	Naples/Camaldoli	
101.200	Radio Cusano Campus	Università degli Studi Niccolò Cusano	Vico Equense/Monte Faito	
101.400	1 Station Radio		Ercolano/Mount Vesuvius/Vesuvius Observatory	Dance music
101.600	Radio Radicale	Radical Party	Ercolano/Mount Vesuvius/Vesuvius Observatory	Political
101.800	Radio Radicale	Radical Party	Naples/Camaldoli	Political
101.800	Radio Italia Anni 60		Vico Equense/Monte Faito	Oldies
102.000	RPZ - Radio Punto Zero		Vico Equense/Monte Faito	
102.300	RTL 102.5		Vico Equense/Monte Faito	
102.600	RTL 102.5		Naples/Camaldoli	
102.800	Radio Evangelo Campania	Assemblies of God in Italy	Naples/Via Camillo Guerra	Religious
102.800	Radio Evangelo Campania	Assemblies of God in Italy	Vico Equense/Monte Faito	Religious
103.000	Kiss Kiss Napoli	Radio Kiss Kiss	Naples/Camaldoli	
103.300	Rai Isoradio	RAI	Naples/Camaldoli	Traffic news
103.500	Radio 24	Il Sole 24 Ore	Naples/Camaldoli	All-news and Talk radio
103.700	Radio 24	Il Sole 24 Ore	Ercolano/Mount Vesuvius/Vesuvius Observatory	All-news and Talk radio
103.900	Rai Radio 3 Classica	RAI	Naples/Camaldoli	Classical music
104.100	Radio Italia Anni 60		Ercolano/Mount Vesuvius/Vesuvius Observatory	Oldies
104.300	Giornale Radio	LuckyMedia srl	Naples/Camaldoli	All-news
104.600	Radio Capital	GEDI Gruppo Editoriale	Ercolano/Mount Vesuvius/Vesuvius Observatory	
104.800	Radio Capital	GEDI Gruppo Editoriale	Naples/Camaldoli	
105.000	Radio 105	Mediaset	Tramonti/Monte Sant'Angelo	
105.100	Radio Kiss Kiss		Ercolano/Mount Vesuvius/Vesuvius Observatory	
105.300	Romantica Radio		Ercolano/Mount Vesuvius/Vesuvius Observatory	Romantic music
105.600	Radio Maria Italia	Associazione Radio Maria	Naples/Camaldoli	Religious
105.800	Radio Amore	Sagittarius	Naples/Camaldoli	
106.000	Radio Napoli	Radio Kiss Kiss	Naples/Camaldoli	Neapolitan music
106.200	RTL 102.5		Ercolano/Mount Vesuvius/Vesuvius Observatory	
106.500	Radio Subasio	Mediaset	Ercolano/Mount Vesuvius/Vesuvius Observatory	
106.800	RPZ - Radio Punto Zero		Ercolano/Mount Vesuvius/Vesuvius Observatory	
107.000	Radio Ibiza	Radio Kiss Kiss	Naples/Camaldoli	Club music
107.200	R101	Mediaset	Vico Equense/Monte Faito	
107.500	Radio Dimensione Suono	RDS	Vico Equense/Monte Faito	
107.800	Radio Radicale	Radical Party	Vico Equense/Monte Faito	Political
108.000	Radio Studio Emme		Ercolano/Mount Vesuvius/Vesuvius Observatory	Neapolitan music

== See also ==
- List of radio stations in Italy
- List of radio stations in Turin
- List of radio stations in Rome
- List of radio stations in Palermo
