= List of radio stations in Monaco =

The following is a list of radio stations in Monaco.

== Monte Carlo ==
Frequency	RDS	Name	Notes	Power	Monaco	France	Italy
87.7	__RDS___	Radio Dimensione Suono					Yes
87.9	__RTL___	RTL	News/Talk	1 kW		Yes	
88.2	R.MARIA_	Radio Maria Italia	Religious	0.1 kW			Yes
88.4	_R_M_C__	Radio Monte Carlo		50 kW			Yes
88.9	_AGORA__	Radio Agora	Local radio	0.2 kW		Yes	
89.1	*RADIO1	Rai Radio Uno Liguria	Government	4 kW			Yes
89.6	_CULTURE	France Culture	Government	5 kW		Yes	
89.9	RADIO_24	Radio 24		5 kW			Yes
90.3	M_RADIO_	M Radio	National music	50 kW		Yes	
90.6	_MEDI_1_	Medi 1	News/Talk	1 kW	Yes		
91.1	*RADIO2	Rai Radio 2	Government	4 kW			Yes
91.4	SKYROCK	Skyrock (radio station)	Urban contemporary			Yes	
91.7	_MUSIQUE	France Musique	Government	5 kW		Yes	
92.1	_VIRGIN_	Virgin Radio Italia	Pop/Rock/Electro			Yes	
92.5	R.MARIA_	Radio Maria Italia					Yes
92.7	________			0.1 kW	Yes		
92.9	__RTL2__	RTL2		1 kW		Yes	
93.2	__JAZZ__	Jazz Radio	Jazz music	0.2 kW		Yes	
93.5	NOSTALGI	Nostalgie	Oldies	50 kW		Yes	
93.8	NOSTALGI	Nostalgie	Oldies	1 kW		Yes	
94.2	__RDS___	Radio Dimensione Suono					Yes
94.5	________			0.1 kW	Yes		
94.8	BLEUAZUR	France Bleu Azur		5 kW		Yes	
95.1	________			0.1 kW	Yes		
95.4	_MONACO_	Radio Monaco	Government	1 kW	Yes		
95.7	__JAZZ__	Jazz Radio	Jazz music	0.2 kW		Yes	
96.1	___FG.__	Radio FG	Dance/Electro	1 kW		Yes	
96.4	_CHERIE_	Chérie		0.3 kW			
96.7	_ETHIC__	Radio Ethic	Environment/Nature	0.3 kW	Yes		
97.0	__INTER_	France Inter	Government	5 kW		Yes	
97.3	CAPITAL_	Radio Capital	Classic Hits and News/Talk				Yes
97.6	__RFM__	RFM	Adult contemporary	1 kW		Yes	
97.9	__SUD___	Sud Radio	News/Talk	200 W		Yes	
98.2	_MONACO_	Radio Monaco	Government	500 W	Yes		
98.5	__RMC___	RMC		50 kW		Yes	
98.8	__RMC___	RMC		1 kW		Yes	
99.1	__105___	Radio 105 Network	Pop music & Urban contemporary	0.1 kW			Yes
99.4	__105___	Radio 105 Network	Pop music & Urban contemporary	1 kW			Yes
99.8	__NRJ___	NRJ	Hot adult contemporary	1 kW		Yes	
100.2	__ZETA__	Radio Zeta	Government			Yes	
100.5	EMOTION_	Radio Emotion		1 kW		Yes	
100.9	NUMBER_1	Radio Number One		10 kW	Yes		
101.1	__FUN___	Fun Radio	Dance & Adult contemporary	0.2 kW		Yes	
101.3	EUROPE_1	Europe 1	News/Talk	1 kW		Yes	
101.6	__RMC2__	Radio Monte Carlo 2 (RMC 2)		10 kW			Yes
102.1	PITCHOUN	Radio Pitchoun	Children	0.2 kW	Yes		
102.4	_RIRE_&_	Rire & Chansons	Entertainment	0.3 kW		Yes	
102.7	CLASSIQ_	Radio Classique	Classical	50 kW		Yes	
103.0	__RFM___	RFM		1 kW		Yes	
103.3	__RDS___	Radio Dimensione Suono		0.5 kW			Yes
103.6	RADIO103	Radio 103		10 kW			Yes
104.1	M_RADIO_	M Radio		1 kW		Yes	
104.6	_CHERIE_	Chérie		0.1 kW		Yes	
105.0	__RDS___	Radio Dimensione Suono		5 kW			Yes
105.3	_DEEJAY_	Radio Deejay		1 kW			Yes
105.5	__INFO__	France Info	News/Talk	5 kW		Yes	
105.7	RADICALE	Radio Radicale	News/Talk	100 kW			Yes
106.0	RADIO_88	Radio 88		1 kW			Yes
106.3	RIVIERA_	Riviera Radio	English language / News	1 kW	Yes		
106.5	RIVIERA_	Riviera Radio	English language / News	50 kW	Yes		
106.8	_R_M_C__	Radio Monte Carlo		1 kW			Yes
107.1	__R101__	R101	Classic Hits	1 kW			Yes
107.3	__BFM___	BFM	Economy	1 kW		Yes	
107.7	_VINCI__	Radio Vinci Autoroutes	Highway advisory radio			Yes	
107.9	KISSKISS	Radio Kiss Kiss	Soul, Funky and Disco music	2 kW			Yes
