= Tiraboschi =

Tiraboschi is a surname. Notable people with the surname include:

- Arduino Tiraboschi (born 1951) Italian biathlete
- Girolamo Tiraboschi (1731 – 1794), Italian literary critic
- Michele Tiraboschi (born 1965) Professor of Labour Law
- Roberto Tiraboschi (born 1958), Italian author
