= Automated telephone survey =

Automated telephone surveys is a systematic collection a data from demography by making calls automatically to the preset list of respondents at the aim of collecting information and gain feedback via the telephone and the internet. Automated surveys are used for customer research purposes by call centres for customer relationship management and performance management purposes. They are also used for political polling, market research and job satisfaction surveying.

An automated phone survey applies the interactive voice response system is any telephone system that interacts with callers without input from a human other than the caller. More specifically, interactive voice response, or IVR, is the technology that automates telephone contact between humans and machines.

== Characteristics ==
- Place automatic calls for landline, mobile phones, PHS, totally free of artificial operation.
- Be served with self-helped indicating voice, customer service representative (CSR) and interchangeable services.
- Apply multiple concurrent calls, can call a number of different target simultaneously.
- Accomplished with text direct synthesis voice (TTS). The text could be transferred to fluent speech automatically.

== Types ==
- Government and Administration

assessing the efficiency and achievement of the government by investigation

- Conference Feedback

Provide a dial-in number, and ask participants to call in to give their feedback after a conference session. Make participation open to all, and eliminate paper forms and manual tabulation.

- Job Satisfaction

Survey employees in companies and get know what they want and need, then make changes in human resource management and welfare system, which help to retain the staff.

- Automatic Notifications

Remind people to pay their utilities automatically

- Customer Satisfaction

Establish a comprehensive customer satisfaction survey system to get feedback about what they want and subsequently offer the better services.

- Academic Research

Educational institutions including colleges and universities rely on phone surveys to get the feedback from the students and parents.

- Robo-Polling

Use of automated phone surveys is common in polling during political campaigns, where it is frequently referred to as robo-polling. It is a low cost and quick way of generating data but it has been criticized because of this. Mike O'Neil of O'Neil Associates Public Opinion Research called this method "cheap and untrustworthy" and news organisations such as CNN, the Associated Press, the New York Times, the Wall street Journal and the Washington Post will not use results from automated polls.

== Advantages ==
=== Low costs ===
Compared to the conventional questionnaires, it saves times and money to conduct the automated telephone survey. It only requires the time to record the questions beforehand.

=== Simple and convenient to process data ===
The survey is based on the computer system, which leads to a faster way to process, analyse and store the data gathered from the phone interviews. In addition, the data is rapidly renewing.

=== High accessibility ===
It is sure that there are more people getting access to telephone rather than other methods (email, TV). Sitting in front of the computer screens monitor and calling people to complete the survey is more convenient than face-to-face interviews. Besides, it is more efficient than mailing out the surveys without response. Therefore, the automated telephone survey is ideal for data collection since it regards anyone from the population as potential respondents.

=== Accurate and reliable results ===
Well-trained interviewers will record the questions in a uniform manner in advance, which means there is little or no biases towards the respondents. Since the data is gathered from a considerable number of people, it means the sample is random and less self-selective. It indicates that the statistically significant results can be collected.

=== Secure ===
The process is conducted anonymously, which means the respondents are able to keep their answers private and confidential. This facilitates the privacy in responses for some controversial and sensitive topics.

== Disadvantages ==
=== Call screen and hang ups ===
The caller identification system is available for more and more people, and some of them may just answer the phone they expected. When they see the unfamiliar numbers, they may not decide to answer or hang up immediately. Approximately two thirds of people in the USA refuse to take part in them. People who have unlisted numbers or have registered on a do not call list will be automatically excluded. Others may choose not to answer by screening calls with answering machines or caller ID. The fact that only a small percent of the population is willing to participate can lead to biased or unreliable results. As they are conducted over the phone, they are also disadvantaged a lack of body language or visual observations.

=== Time control ===
The key of high respondent rate is to control the time of survey. The interview may disrupt the personal time of respondents because they may be involved in other activities, such as eating dinner or watching television. It is necessary to create closed-end questions.

=== Source of numbers ===
Therefore, the respondents' personal information may be disclosed.

== The process of creating an automated telephone survey ==
1. Set the questions and design the survey via the website.
2. Record questions in a good manner.
3. Upload the respondent phone list and dial the number automatically
4. Get responses in time.

== Improving survey response rates ==
=== Give a brief introduction of the survey to each respondent at the start of interview. ===
- Tell each survey respondent the source of personal contact information clearly in case of violating privacy.
- Outline the purpose of the survey, along with an estimate of the time needed to complete the survey.
- Promise confidentiality and anonymity to the respondent of their answers and opinions.
- Let the respondent know that participation in the survey is of their own free will.
- Ask for permission to begin the survey.

=== Collect each response as accurate as possible. ===
- With the assistance of information systems, enter that response into the computer to establish the database.

=== Classify demographic data, which allows the data could be for useful information. ===
- Demographic data includes gender, age, political affiliation, religious affiliation, gender identity and ethnicity.

=== Be concise ===
- Try to make the questionnaire as short and clear as possible. It is better keep it under 10 questions.

=== Provide incentives ===
- Little incentives including small discounts will draw respondents' attentions.

=== Highly trained interviewers are necessary ===
- In order to facilitate the procedures of telephone surveys and enhance the quality of data collection, the staff must be well-trained with the supervision of monitor.

== Other sampling methods ==
- Online survey
- Face-to-face survey
- Mail survey

== See also ==
- Call centre
- Text to speech
- Speaker recognition
- IVR
- Nuisance call
- CSR
- TTS
