= RTL 102.5 TV =

- Country: Italy

Programming
- Language: Italian
- Picture format: 1080i (HDTV)

Ownership
- Owner: RTL 102.5 Hit Radio S.r.l.

History
- Launched: 2001
- Former names: 102.5 Hit Channel (2000–2001)

Links
- Website: http://www.rtl.it/

Availability

Terrestrial
- Digital: Channel 36 and 536 (HD)

RTL 102.5 TV is an Italian music television channel, broadcasting as live video feed of the Italian radio station RTL 102.5. It broadcasts on-air transmissions from the studio, as well as music videos cut to fit the radio edit; whenever a song has no official video, a mix of previous videos or a sequence or images chosen from social networks is shown instead.

== History ==
After long period of experimental services started in 2000, 102.5 Hit Channel was launched in 2001, based mainly on text messaging from the viewers. In 2006, due to low viewers ratings, the channel switch to Radiovisione, broadcasting the whole RTL 102.5 programming.

== Programming ==
Excluding some news bulletins, few programmes and advertising, the broadcast day of RTL 102.5 radio is broadcast live on television.

== Availability ==
It is available free to air on Hot Bird and digital terrestrial television in Italy along with few Italian local television channels. It is also rebroadcast on Canale Italia.

== See also ==
- Radio na Wizji
