= Monte Zappi =

Mountain in Italy

Monte Gennaro
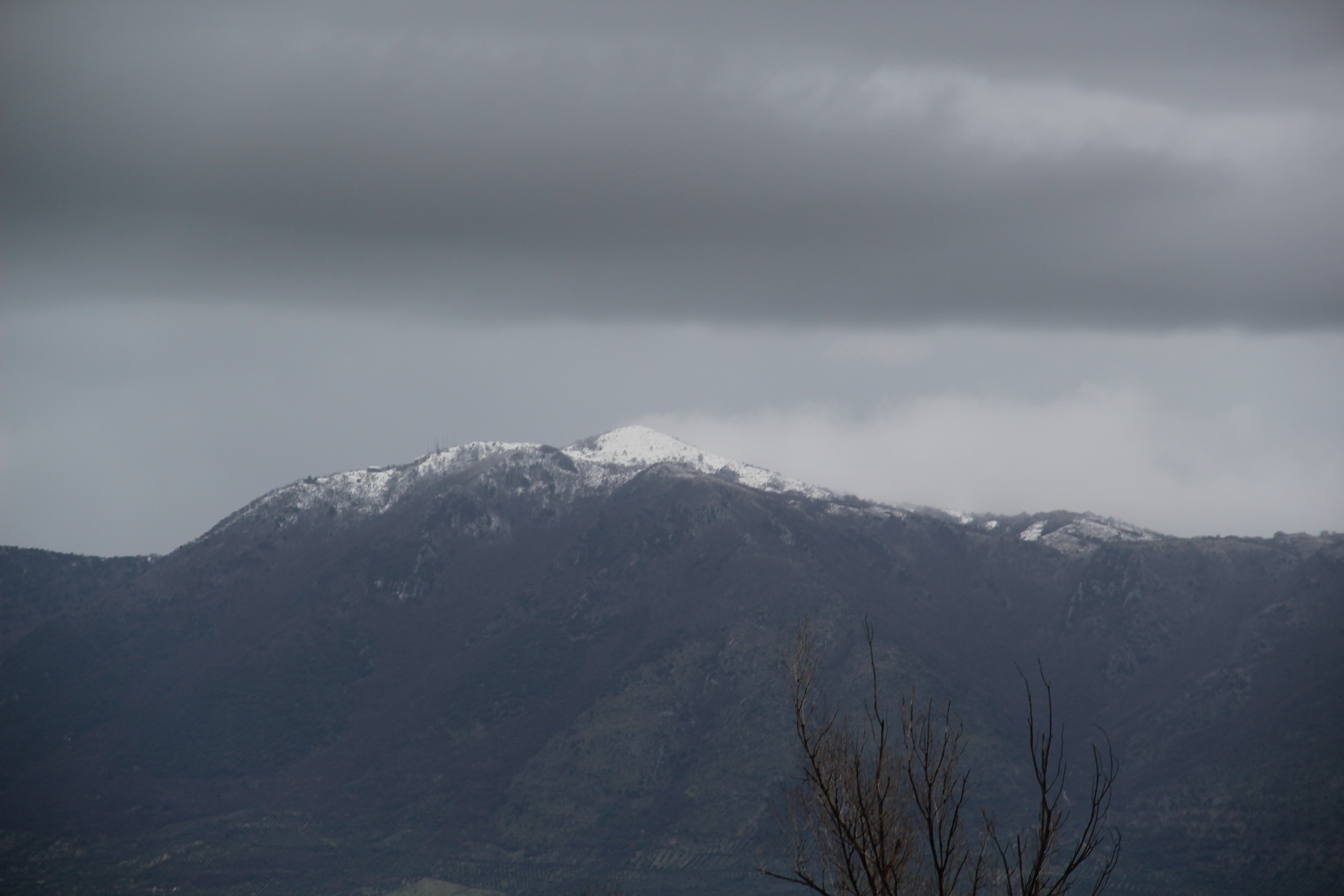
- Monte Gennaro seen in March after a snowfall.

Highest point
- Elevation: 1,276 m (4,186 ft)
- Coordinates: 43°03′22″N 12°48′31″E

Geography
- Location within Italy
- Location: Lazio, Italy
- Parent range: Monti Lucretili

Monte Gennaro is a peak in the Monti Lucretili, in Lazio, central Italy. It has an elevation of 1,271 metres (4,170 ft) and is the highest peak visible from Rome looking eastwards. It is located in the province of Rome, in the communal territories of Palombara Sabina and San Polo dei Cavalieri.

== History ==
It is likely identifiable with the Lucretili Mons mentioned by Horace as visible from his Sabine farm, and probably identical with the Mons Lucretius mentioned in the Liber Pontificalis, which speaks of possessio in territorio Sabinensi quae cognominatur ad duas casas sub monte Lucretio in the time of Constantine. The name ad duas casas is supposed to survive in the chapel of the Madonna della Casa near Rocca Giovane, and the Mons Lucretilis is generally (and rightly) identified with Monte Gennaro, a limestone peak 4,160 ft (1,270 m) high, which forms a prominent feature in the view northeast of Rome. Excavations on the supposed site of Horace's farm were begun in September 1909.
