= Belmonte Mezzagno =

Belmonte Mezzagno Bellumunti U Mizzagnu (Sicilian)
- Comune
- Comune di Belmonte Mezzagno
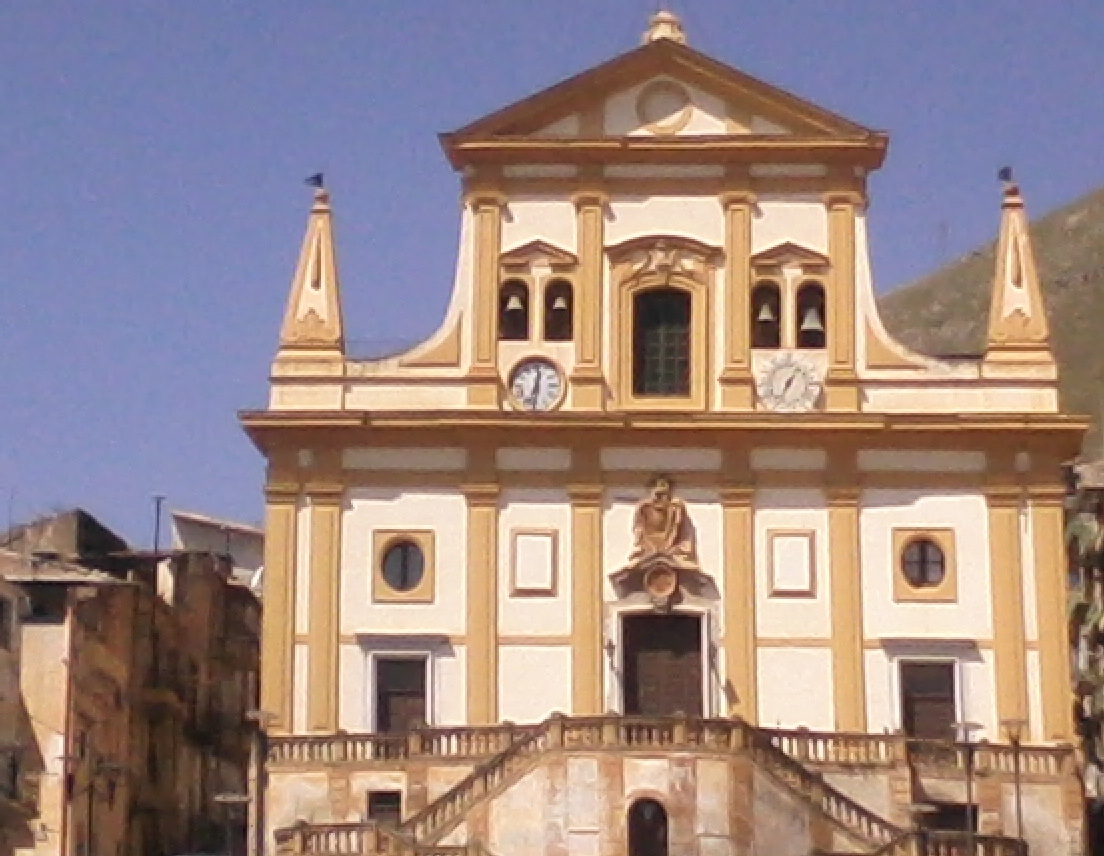
- Church of the Most Holy Crucifix

- Coat of arms

- Location within Italy Location within Sicily
- Coordinates: 38°3′N 13°23′E
- Country: Italy
- Region: Sicily
- Metropolitan city: Palermo (PA)

Government
  - Mayor: Ivan Ferraro

Area
  - Total: 29.2 km^{2} (11.3 sq mi)
- Elevation: 356 m (1,168 ft)

Population (Dec. 2004)
  - Total: 10,424
  - Density: 357/km^{2} (925/sq mi)
- Demonym: belmontesi o mezzagnoti
- Time zone: UTC+1 (CET)
  - Summer (DST): UTC+2 (CEST)
- Postal code: 90031
- Dialing code: 091
- Website: Official website

Belmonte Mezzagno (Sicilian: Bellumunti but more properly U Mizzagnu in the local version of the Sicilian language) is a comune (municipality) in the Metropolitan City of Palermo in the Italian region Sicily, located about 15 kilometres (9 mi) south of Palermo.

Belmonte Mezzagno was founded in 1752, when Prince Giuseppe Emanuele Ventimiglia asked and obtained the "Licentia Populandi" from King Charles III. The first urban settlement of the country was the "Bagghiu", a large open-air court, where the houses overlooked and was accessed by a large common entrance dominated by an arch placed at the edge of the Spatola torrent, where inhabitants could easily draw water. The first census taken in 1752 by the priest, don Stefano Grasso, shows that there were 64 houses and 185 inhabitants. The Bourbon army destroyed much of the town by fire on May 8, 1849 as retribution for the towns support of the 1848 Sicilian revolution.

In the State Archives of Palermo, there is a request by priest don Nicolo Lo Valvo for compensation for pastoral services in the land of Belmonte prior to its official founding from September 1741 to December 1742. It is not known for certain whether the land was being occupied seasonally or permanently during this period of time. The first church, founded in 1756, soon became too small for the growing community. The result was the construction of the Chiesa Madre del SS. Crocifisso in 1776 which is still a center of life in Belmonte Mezzagno today.

Belmonte Mezzagno is famous for its olive oil and goat's milk cheese.

== Demographic evolution ==
Historical population

Year	Pop.	±%
1861	3,605	—
1871	3,881	+7.7%
1881	4,297	+10.7%
1901	4,931	+14.8%
1911	4,684	−5.0%

Year	Pop.	±%
1921	4,906	+4.7%
1931	4,977	+1.4%
1936	4,718	−5.2%
1951	5,899	+25.0%
1961	6,522	+10.6%

Year	Pop.	±%
1971	7,431	+13.9%
1981	8,252	+11.0%
1991	9,601	+16.3%
2001	10,322	+7.5%

Source: Data from ISTAT
