= San Giovanni Gemini =

- Comune
- Comune di San Giovanni Gemini
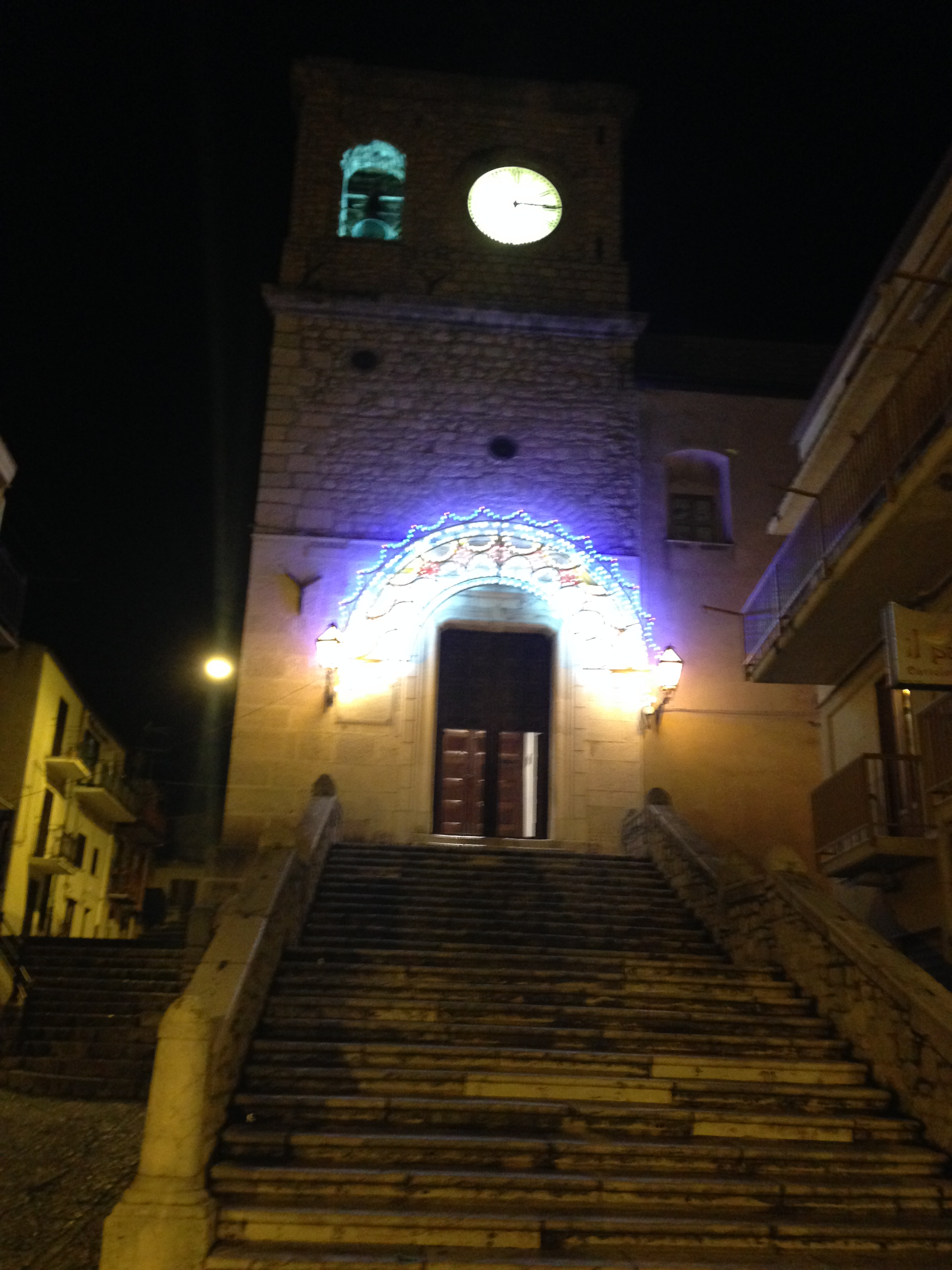
- Mother church.

- Location within Italy Location within Sicily
- Coordinates: 37°38′N 13°39′E
- Country: Italy
- Region: Sicily
- Province: Agrigento (AG)

Government
  - Mayor: Dino Zimbardo

Area
  - Total: 26.3 km^{2} (10.2 sq mi)
- Elevation: 670 m (2,200 ft)

Population (30 November 2016)
  - Total: 8,023
  - Density: 305/km^{2} (790/sq mi)
- Demonym: Sangiovannesi
- Time zone: UTC+1 (CET)
  - Summer (DST): UTC+2 (CEST)
- Postal code: 92020
- Dialing code: 0922
- Website: Official website

San Giovanni Gemini (Sicilian: San Giuvanni) is a comune (municipality) in the Province of Agrigento in the Italian region Sicily, located about 60 kilometres (37 mi) southeast of Palermo and about 35 kilometres (22 mi) north of Agrigento.

== History ==
Originally, the town was called San Giovanni di Cammarata due to the closeness of the eponymous mountain. In 1879, the name was changed into San Giovanni Gemini after the two equally high hills in the area known as "i gemelli" (twins).

The town was founded in 1451 by the Count of Cammarata, Federico Abbatelli Chiaramonte when he obtained the privilege of building new lands (Ius aedificandi); it wasn't until 1507, though, that he obtained from King Ferdinand II of Aragon permission to populate the land (licentia populandi)

San Giovanni was elevated to a duchy by Count Ercole Branciforte, who was invested with the title of duke by King Philip II of Spain; the royal privilege was granted on 10 November 1587 and made official in Palermo on 15 May 1588. Under his ownership, the duchy underwent a substantial economic and demographic growth which led him to separate the territory into two parts named Cammarata and San Giovanni.

The Duchy of San Giovanni passed as a dowry to the Moncada family in 1666 following the marriage in that year of Duchess Giovanna Branciforte Moncada (1645-1680). She was invested as the owner of the fiefdom on 18 February 1656 alongside her maternal uncle Ferdinando Moncada Gaetani, son of Ignazio of the princes of Paternò.

In 1708, the town was bestowed to Count don Luigi Moncada, whose family ruled San Giovanni and Cammarata until the abolition of feudality in 1812, the year when feudalism was abolished in Sicily. The abolition was a result of the new Sicilian Constitution granted by King Ferdinand III of Bourbon.

== Industry ==
Situated on the slopes of Cammarata mountain, San Giovanni Gemini's industry has an agrarian bias with the focus on cereals, citrus fruits, olives, almonds, beans and fruit. Cattle breeding and sheep farms are flourishing while the local handicrafts are characterised by wooden, wrought iron, and ceramic objects. There are numerous rock-salt mines and sand quarries in the area.

== Local sights ==
San Giovanni Gemini's rich history and Catholic heritage are reflected in a number of local sights. The seventeenth century Chiesa Madre is a particular highlight: dedicated to S. Giovanni Battista, it contains a wooden crucifix and an urn both of which have been dated back to 1700. In addition, the town contains two other religious highlights in the Chiesa del Carmine and the nearby sixteenth century convent.

San Giovanni Gemini borders the municipality of Cammarata.
