= Customer service representative =

Agent responsible for handling complaints, processing orders, and communicating services

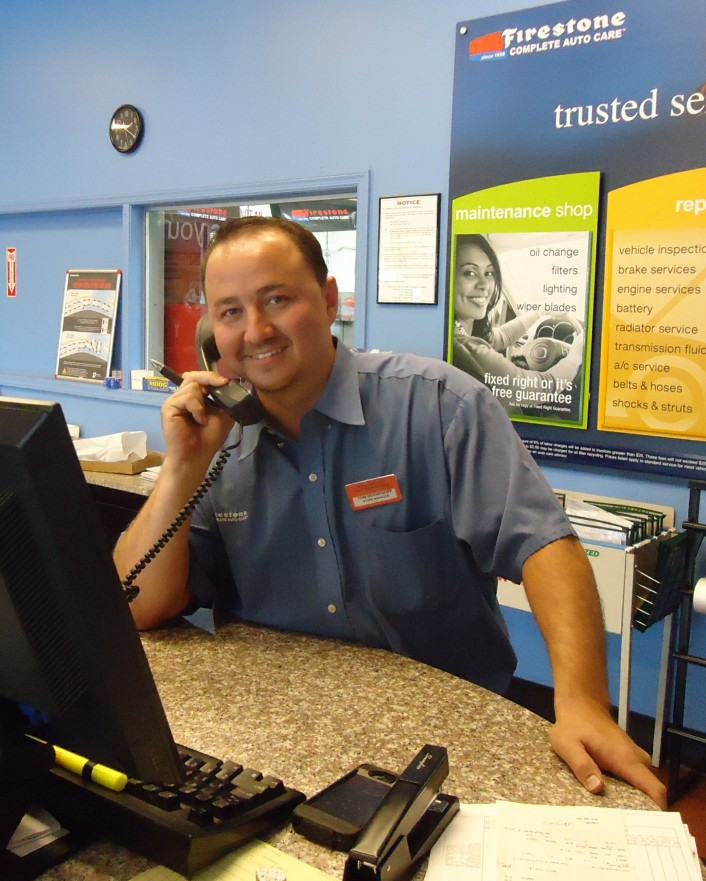
A Firestone customer service representative in Berkeley Heights, New Jersey

Customer service representatives, customer service advisors, customer service agents, or customer service associates are employees who interact with customers to handle and resolve complaints, process orders, and provide information about an organization’s products and services. They may work in an office with a call center or in retail. Customer service representatives answer questions or requests from customers or the public. They typically provide services by phone, but some also interact with customers face to face, by email or text, via live chat, and through social media. Qualifications include good communication, problem-solving, and computer skills.

== Required skills ==
Customer service representative positions often require at least a high school diploma. Representatives often have some experience with office software.

First impressions are important in this job. The moment one begins to communicate with a customer, one is being judged. The way one communicates with a customer will not only influence how the conversation develops, but the overall impression of the CSR and the organization they represent. There are five key customer service skills that define the best CSRs:

- Ability to establish rapport with customers.
- Problem solving
- Strong listening skills
- Strong commercial awareness
- Team working

== Salary ==
Although earnings may vary, the median hourly average for CSRs in 2017 was $15.81, in the US. People in this job typically have less than 20 years' experience. Skills that are associated with high pay for this job are those in customer service metrics, Microsoft Office, customer relationship management, and oral and verbal communication.

== See also ==
- Sales territory
- Clerk
