= RadioRock =

Radio Rock
Italy
- Broadcast area: Central-Italy, Lazio
- Frequencies: FM 106.6 (in Rome and Lazio)

Programming
- Format: Rock music

History
- First air date: 1985

Links
- Website: www.radiorock.it

Radio Rock is an Italian radio station based in Rome which broadcasts in most of Lazio, and is streamed over the internet from its website.

Radio Rock broadcasts rock music 24 hours a day. It started in 1985 and has steadily grown over the years. According to the Audiradio report on the first quarter of 2010 it reached 156,000 people daily (average).

In 1998, when three of the founders left the station (Artico, Castaldo, Andreani), the audience averaged 101,000 for the day.

Radio Rock is well known in the Italian rock scene for promoting international musicians previously unknown. This has been possible since Radio Rock sponsored a great number of concerts and events in Rome. According to this organization, Radio Rock brought to its public a number of artists such as Porcupine Tree, the Bevis Frond, Ozric Tentacles, Nirvana and others.

Different disc jockeys have worked free for Radio Rock since its foundation in 1985. Each DJ brings a particular choice in musical selection, but all of them are deeply fond of rock music. In 2004 was born Radio Rock Italia, a side project about only Italian rock music presented by female DJs: Francesca, Anto, Marta, Tosca, Vale.

Radio Rock broadcasts on FM 106,600 mhz, DAB (Digital Audio Broadcasting) and online at www.radiorock.it

== DJ list ==
- Emilio Pappagallo
- Matteo Catizone
- Fabio Giannotti
- Dj Armandino
- Dj Oreste
- Prince Faster
- Paolo Mazzullo [dead in 2010]
- Marco Terragni
- Margus aka Mario Tagliaferri
- Michele Luches
- Aldo Semenuk
- Massimo Di Roma
- Michele Properzi
- Stefano Santoni
- Peter Sarram
- Faber Cucchetti
- Jelena Milic
- Claudia McDowell
- Gianni Ciaccio
- Marco Scozzafava (aka Marco Silvestri)
- Marco Cavalieri
- Gianpaolo Castaldo
- Giampiero Crisanti
- Franz Andreani
- Marco Artico
- Flavia Cardinali
- Baffo Jorg (Metal Massacre Format, died in 2012)
- Daniela Giuliani

Starting from Radio Rock, some dj's founded Radio Rock "The Original" (www.radiorock.to) in 1999 and in 2008 won the "European Podcast Award" in Professional Category for Italy. In 2010 Paolo Mazzullo, one of the founders, had a stroke and died. After his death, in 2011 other dj's decided to leave Radio Rock creating the Rock AM project on Radio Popolare Roma.
