= Michele Tiraboschi =

Italian professor and writer (born 1965)

- Born: 27 June 1965 (age 61); Seriate, Bergamo, Italy
- Education: University of Milano
- Occupations: Professor and writer

Michele Tiraboschi (born 27 June 1965 in Seriate – Italy) is a Full Professor of Labour Law at the University of Modena and Reggio Emilia, Italy, and is the author of many publications. He is known for his participation in national debates on Italian labour market reforms and for his research in labour law.

== Professional career ==
Michele Tiraboschi is currently the Director of the Marco Biagi Centre for International and Comparative Studies in Modena and the ADAPT – Association for International and Comparative Studies in Labour and Industrial Relations in Bergamo. He is the founding editor of the E-Journal of International and Comparative Labour Studies and the Editor of the ADAPT Labour Studies Book-Series, both are published by ADAPT University Press. He is also the Deputy Director of the Italian Labour Law Review in Italian (Diritto delle Relazioni Industriali) (Giuffrè.). From 2002 to 2008, Michele Tiraboschi was appointed by the President of the Italian Republic as a member of the Guarantee Committee for the implementation of the Law on the Right to Strike. He represented the Italian government in the Directorate of the European Foundation for the Improvement of Living and Working Conditions. For many years, he has been a consultant and legal advisor to the Italian Ministers of Labour and Social Policy, Higher Education and Research, and the Estonian Minister of Labour in the area of conflict of interest.

== Publications ==
Professor Tiraboschi has published extensively in Italian and English in a wide range of areas in Labour Law, labour market reforms, trade union law and community law, youth employment, education and employment, forms of representation of atypical/ temporary labour force, and labour contracts. He is a columnist on employment and industrial relations of the Italian newspapers Il Sole 24 Ore and Avvenire.
