= Mass media in Italy =

Mass media in Italy includes a variety of online, print, and broadcast formats, such as radio, television, newspapers, and magazines.

== History ==
The governmental Ministry of Communications formed in 1924. "The legalization of local, independent broadcasting stations in 1976 radically changed the media landscape."

== Newspapers ==
Among the most widely read national newspapers in Italy are Corriere della Sera, Corriere dello Sport – Stadio, La Gazzetta dello Sport, Il Giorno, la Repubblica, and La Stampa. "Local and regional papers are particularly vital in Italy."

== See also ==
- Cinema of Italy
- Internet in Italy
- Telecommunications in Italy
- Italian literature
- Censorship in Italy
- Open access in Italy to scholarly communication
- Italian Periodical Press Union

== Bibliography ==
- Euromedia Research Group; Mary Kelly; et al., eds. (2004). "Italy". Media in Europe (3rd ed.). SAGE Publications. ISBN 978-0-7619-4132-3.
- Mark Gilbert; Robert K. Nilsson (2007). "Media". Historical Dictionary of Modern Italy. Scarecrow Press. ISBN 978-0-8108-6428-3.
- Ross Eaman (2009). "Italy". Historical Dictionary of Journalism. Scarecrow Press. ISBN 978-0-8108-6289-0.
