= Radio Popolare =

- Type: Radio
- Country: Italy
- Availability: Most of Italy
- Official website: http://www.radiopopolare.it/

Radio Popolare (or RP) is an independent radio station based in Milan, Italy. Founded in 1976, Radio Popolare is one of the oldest listener-supported radio stations in Italy. Mostly known for its progressive and liberal political orientation, in 1992 RP founded "Popolare Network" with other five affiliated radio stations based in Rome, Florence and Bologna. Radio Popolare airs public news, public affairs, talk, entertainment and music programming.

== Bibliography ==
- Ma libera veramente. Trent’anni di Radio Popolare: voci, parole, immagini - Editore Kowalski
- Vedi alla voce Radio Popolare, Ferrentino S., Bonini T., Gattuso L. - Editore Garzanti Libri
