= Radio Dimensione Suono =

Radio station in Rome, Italy

RDS
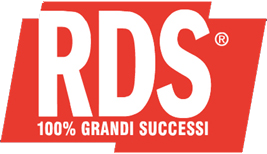

Varese, Milan, Monza, Rome; Italy
- Broadcast area: Italy - National FM, DAB and Hotbird
- Frequencies: FM several frequencies, change from geographical side to side SKY Italia Canale 700 DTT
- Branding: Stardust Records - partner with RDS Next

Programming
- Format: Radio
- Affiliations: Stardust Records -

Ownership
- Owner: Radio Dimensione Suono S.p.A.
- Sister stations: Dimensione Suono Roma, Dimensione Suono 2, Ram Power

History
- First air date: 1978

Technical information
- Class: Europa

Links
- Website: www.rds.it - [www.stardustrecords.it]

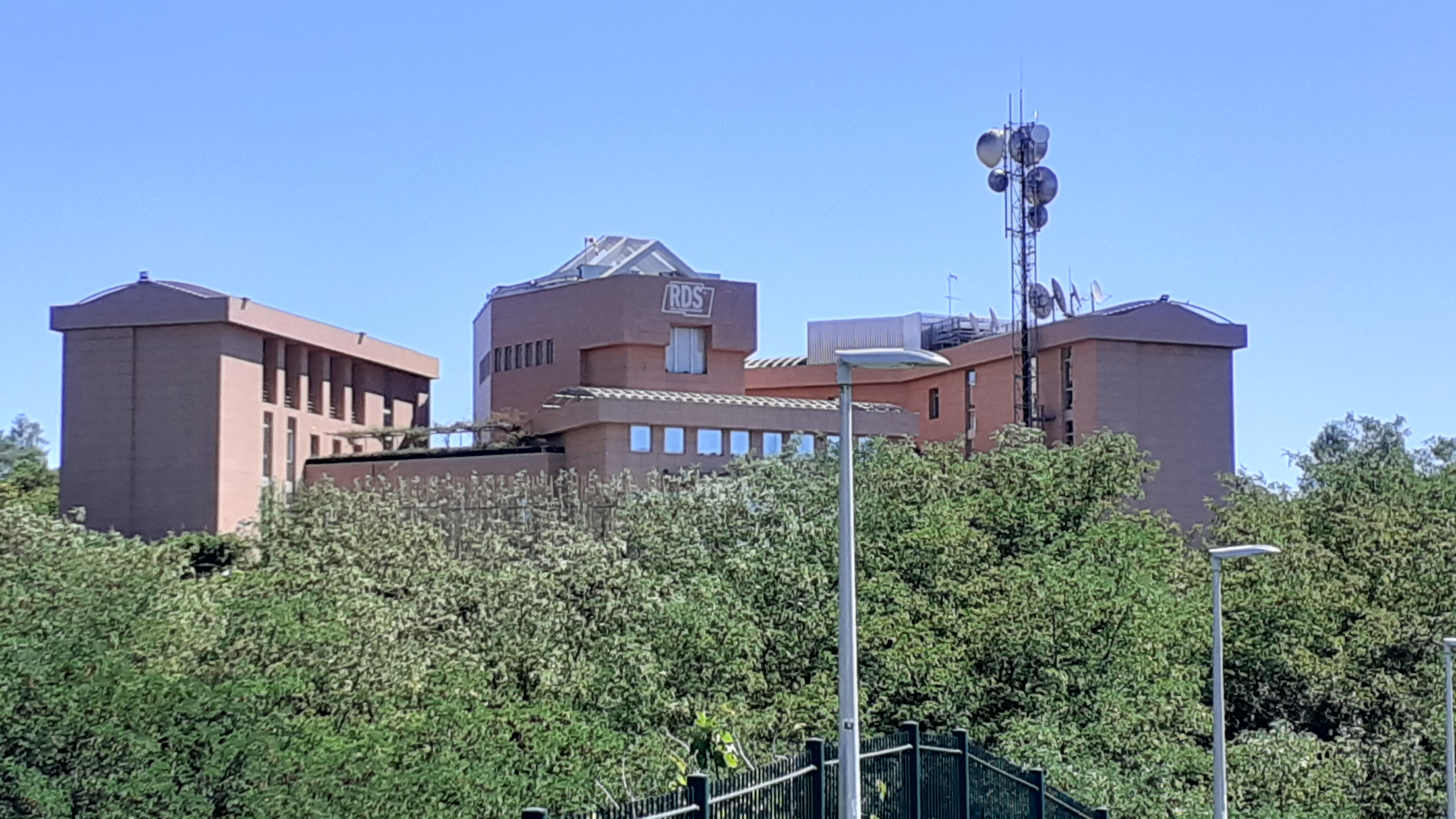
RDS headquarters in Pineto Regional Park

Radio Dimensione Suono (RDS) is a radio station founded in 1978. It broadcasts in the Italian language, and broadcasts Pop music and Italian music.

It is also broadcast on SKY Italia channel 700 and was also broadcast for a few months on Worldspace.

== Weekday programming ==
RDS's primary weekday programming includes:

Frequence	Programme	Description (CET time)	
at exact time	Un ricordo con RDS	An old hit that did not go off before 1980 and that it did not go off after 2007 (2006 in the past)	
at exact time	every 30 minutes	Novità RDS	New single releases from Italy and around the world
at exact time	every 30 minutes	Tournée RDS	This space includes a song of a certain group or artist which RDS sponsor. At the same time listeners are invited to sms the name of the band or artist to win a ticket to their concert
Anteprima RDS	every 30 minutes	This space includes 4 songs (cut and mixed) coming from an album not yet released. At the same time listeners are invited to sms the name of the artist or album to win it beforehand	
every 40 minutes	Sport News	A short summary of the latest sport news lasting around 1–2 minutes	
every 33 minutes	Weekend RDS	Talk show (from Friday 19h20 to Sunday 23h20)	
every 57 minutes	Attualità RDS	The latest news cory around 3 minutes	
every 57 minutes	100 sec con Enrico Mentana	100 seconds with the journalist Enrico Mentana (09h59, 10h59, 11h59, 17h59 & 18h59)	
every 57 minutes	Cinema RDS	Rosaria Renna narrates the synopsis of a current film, helped by audio samples from the film	

== Personalities ==
- Valerio Scarponi
- Claudio Guerrini
- Anna Pettinelli
- Sergio Friscia
- Max Pagani
- Filippo Firli
- Paolo Piva
- Valerio Scarponi
- Petra Loreggian
- Flippo Ferraro
- Marlen Pizzo
- Chiara de Pisa
- Flippo Firli
- Giuditta Arecco
- Roberta Lanfranchi
- Max Del Buono
- Beppe De Marco
- Melania Agrimano
- Corrado Trisoglio
- Renzo di Falco
- Danny Virgilio

== Bumpers ==
Until 2015, RDS knowns only one bumper. From 28 September 2015 RDS, adds five more bumper, one with a choir, one with a loop, one with doubts, one with a guitar, and one with a DJ. The summer bumpers are the same: six bumpers. In the first there are people singing the summer, in the second with sparkling sound, the third is a fast bumper and the voice starts after a short music, in the fourth there are girls, in the fifth is a romantic song and is the slowest summer bumper and in the last bumper a person says Estate (summer) at low voice. From 10 September 2018 RDS (Most comes back in other occasion) comes seven new bumper: The first is a long bumper. The second and the third has a Christmas variant, the four is a slow bumper, the fifth and the sixth are the same, but in the sixth after a short music the name is repeat like other bumper, and the final bumper (with guitar and like the fourth bumper with NEW HIT) is (almost) with the similar structure of the fourth bumper before September 10, 2018, but the warning (Selezioniamo le migliori Novità, per trasformarle in grandi successi.) is before Novità that it is said three instead five times and a slower time instead to be Novità before the warning and the slogan (Musica Nuova (New Music)) but RDS is the same: is at end of the bumper like other bumpers: RDS!!! (instruments play the jingle instead people saying it for the first time!). As the first mid of June 2019, RDS adds five new bumpers: The first is a DJ, the second is people saying: Voglia d'Estate (Italian for Summer Like), the third is a person saying the slogan at rap time, the fourth is a girl saying the slogan and it is not the bumper showed before 20 and 40 minutes, and the final bumper is similar, but the RDS slogan it says two times. However, the six bumper of Summer until 2018 there are used after 30 minutes after RDS Novità without the full bumper replaying some warning (different: Ricordare un emozione, con un successo senza tempo.), similar to New Hit Bumper. In summer 2020 there are the same. From Christmas 2018, RDS adds two bumper added from 10 September 2018 in Christmas version with bells. The other Christmas Bumpers for 151.54.33.102 are unknown. The 00:00 Time until September 9, 2018, a speaker will say the hour and then the conductors will talk. As of September 10, RDS add a New Bumper where they say the hour and after there are people saying :Whoo! and next the up said bumper. After there all (9 songs), there are music and the Radio name's. In summer 2020, Rosaria Renna says in what Estate (in English Summer) the song that will play it was famous (from 1980 to 2010 for 30 years).

== Past personalities ==
- Stefano Piccirillo (now at Radio Kiss Kiss)
- Mauro Marino (now at Radio Kiss Kiss)
- Gigi Ariemma (now at Radio Capital)
- Federico Russo (now at Radio Deejay)
- Elena Di Dioccio
- Maurizio Costanzo
- Barty Colucci (now at RTL 102.5)
- Roberto Coppola
- Andrea Pellizzari (now at Radio Deejay)
