= Radio Radicale =

- Rome; Italy
- Frequency: Various

Programming
- Format: News, talk, and politics; parliamentary debates

Ownership
- Owner: Pannella List/Italian Radicals
- Operator: Centro di Produzione Spa

History
- First air date: 1976

Links
- Website: radioradicale.it

Radio Radicale is the official radio station of the Italian Radical Party and its successor, the Italian Radicals. Founded in 1976 as part of the Radio libere ("Free Radio”) movement, it has no commercial advertisements and is partly funded by the party, with support from the Italian government as part of an agreement for the broadcasting of Parliamentary sessions.

Despite being an official political party organ, Radio Radicale dedicates its airtime to broadcasting parliamentary live debates from the Italian Chamber of Deputies and the Italian Senate as well as important court cases. It broadcasts Italian political party conventions of all political spectrums, from far right to far left. The remaining airtime is used for programs about current events relevant to the political beliefs of the Radical Party.

In December 2008, Radio Radicale was awarded by Italia Oggi as "best specialized radio broadcaster".

== History ==
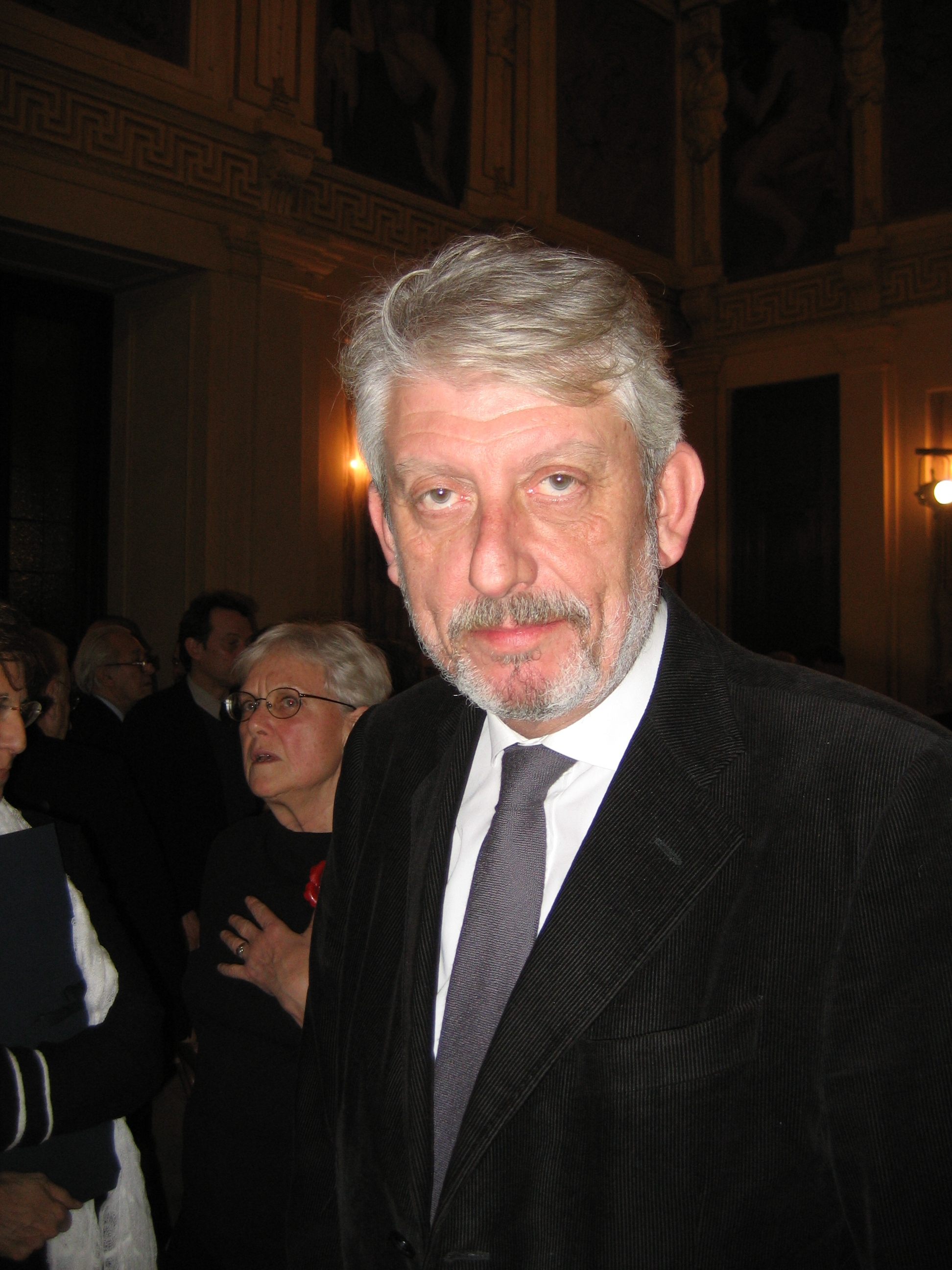
Former director Massimo Bordin.

Radio Radicale was founded between 1975 and 1976 by a group belonging to the Radical Party in a small apartment near Villa Pamphili, in the Gianicolense district of Rome.

Following the liberalization of radio broadcasting by the Constitutional Court between 1974 and 1976, and the spread of small private radio stations, Radio Radicale was known for its use of low-cost equipment but it stood out for its particular philosophy. Radio Radicale set out to create a valid public service alternative to the state broadcaster RAI, using the name “Radicale” (radical not just in reference to its role as a party organ but also for an editorial policy characterized by impartiality, professionalism and innovation.

Along with the news about the party, Radio Radicale began a schedule dedicated to the main events of the Italian institutional and political life: since the beginning, its main distinctive traits had been the live broadcasts of parliamentary sessions, congresses of the main parties and important trials, making them accessible to the wide population without interruption or journalistic commentary.

The radio station presented press reviews, direct discussions with politicians, man-in-the-street interviews and broadcasts for immigrant communities in Italy.

In summer 1986, as the broadcaster risked closure for lack of funds, it received thousands of calls which were put on air uncensored. This was the start of Radio Parolaccia (Radio Swear Word), an original programme where listeners could express their opinions about various themes. The programme was interrupted by the court after one month and the deputy prosecutor Pietro Saviotti signed a seizure decree of the answering machines on 14 August, because listeners had committed crimes like contempt of the institutions and apology of fascism. After two months, the Parliament intervened and extended the public funding for Party publishing to the radio stations, which forced Radio Radicale to officially become a Party branch. The initiative of uncensored phone calls was repeated in 1991 and 1993.

The official website was created in 1998, expanding the station's audio programming with multimedia content. The full archive was placed online for free download.

=== Recent events ===
In 1997, the Prodi I Cabinet refused to renew the agreement with Radio Radicale for the broadcast of parliamentary sessions and RAI began to develop its own dedicated radio station 7 years since the law which instituted it. Important cultural and political personalities asked the government to consider the so-called "Mammì bill"—which obliged Rai to create a parliamentary radio channel—null and void. The proposal was to extend the agreement with Radio Radicale for another 3 years, and to allow for a call for tender when the contract would come up for renewal.

Following a political debate with demonstrations and nonviolent initiatives by the Radicals, the Parliament approved the law Nº 224 of 11 July 1998 concerning Radio broadcasting of Parliament's work and benefits for publishing. The law established the call for tender as a stipulation of the agreement and renewed the contract with Radio Radicale for another three years. RAI's obligation to broadcast parliamentary sessions was kept, but the public company was prevented from extending its radio network until the entry into force of the telecommunications general reform.

In 2001, 2004 and 2006, the agreement with Radio Radicale was renewed according to the stipulations of the financial law. Under the contract, Radio Radicale has to broadcast, between 8 am and 9 pm, at least 60% of the annual total number of hours dedicated by the Parliament to the sessions in the chambers. Those broadcasts cannot be interrupted, preceded or followed, for a period of thirty minutes from their beginning and their end, by commercial or political advertisements.

=== Renewal of the agreement (2010–2013) ===
For 2010 and 2011, the agreement with the Ministry of Economic Development included a €9.9 million funding for Centro di produzione S.p.a. For 2012, two laws of 2011 allowed a total expenditure of €10 million and for 2013 the same amount was confirmed in 2012.

=== Renewal in 2018-2019 ===
Up to 2018, Radio Radicale received €8.2 million, according to the agreement with the Ministry of Economic Development for the broadcast of parliamentary sessions, and another €4 million as acontribution to their publishing activities.

The 2019 budget law has prolonged the agreement for the parliamentary session broadcasting by Radio Radicale for only one semester, allocating €5 million gross (€4 million net) for the year 2019.

== Governance ==
Centro di Produzione SpA is the publisher of Radio Radicale, its archive and of its website. The company, headquartered in Rome, has the following shareholders:

- Pannella List/Italian Radicals: 62.85%
- Sequenza SpA: 25.00%
- Cecilia Maria Angioletti: 6.00%
- Centro di Produzione SpA: 6.15%

== Technologies ==
With 250 transmitters, Radio Radicale covers 75% of the territory of Italy reaching up to 85% of the population in AM and FM. Furthermore, the broadcast via satellite Eutelsat Hot Bird 13 East has allowed Radio Radicale to expand its audience all over Europe and in wide areas of Africa and Asia, including the Middle East, with a potential audience of 98 million households.

Radio Radicale is available also in streaming through the website and an official app for smartphones, offering also additional multimedia content.

It is a member of the consortium DAB Italia for the development and diffusion of DAB technologies in Italy.

== Organization ==
Hours of audio and video recordings are made every year through a system of connections with public institutions and events. Signals are received through fixed or temporary lines by wire, radio, satellite or digital links and, when using analog telephone lines, recordings are immediately digitalised by an encoding system which produces ten channels at the same time around the clock. Once the signal reaches the main headquarters, the different signals are diffused through an active matrix system which allows the distribution of 128 signals.

Centro di Produzione S.p.A. is the owner of the headquarters where Radio Radicale operates, and includes three studios. Two of them have their own independent Radio director, while the third is connected with two director and it is mainly dedicated to post-production. All four studios can broadcast.

In addition to the main studios, the broadcaster has four production centres where transfers, minor editing and telephone interview recordings are made. Telephone lines used for conversations to be aired are digitalised and all recordings have been made in MP3 format since July 2006.

Radio Radicale is organized through the following divisions:

- Journalistic direction
- Newsroom
- Administrative direction
- Administration
- Archive and Internet
- Technical sector
- Network checking

In addition to its own personnel, these divisions also make use of collaborators and consultants.

== Archive ==
The constant work of document collection and preservation done by Radio Radicale during its activity has allowed the creation of an important and broad archive, defined in 1993 by the Archival Superintendency as being "of a remarkable historical interest". In the same year, the archive was quoted in the volume Fonti orali: censimento degli istituti di conservazione published by the Italian Ministry of Cultural and Environmental Heritage, while in the following year it was a subject of the Congresso sugli archivi dei partiti politici (Congress About Political Parties' Archives) organized by the Central Archives of the State.

The archive can be consulted freely and by everyone.

In May 2007, during the congress L'archivio multimediale di Radio Radicale: un patrimonio per la storia, l'informazione, la democrazia (The Multimedial Archive of Radio Radicale: an Heritage for History, Information, Democracy), organized by RR along with the Doctorate of Research on European History and the Archivists and Librarists Special School of the Sapienza University of Rome, various critics and archivist agreed in recognizing not only the historical and social value of the archival production of Radio Radicale, but also its complementarity with the main collections of Italian documents, first of all those belonging to RAI. The former manager of Rai Teche, Barbara Scaramucci, stated that:

The archive of Radio Radicale is absolutely precious and entirely complementary with the one of Rai [and] is true that a large part of the materials inside the archive of Radio Radicale is not inside the archive of Radio Rai and the work done by Radio Radicale since 1976 is completely different from that one done by Rai radio broadcasting.

Others testified to the uniqueness of the public service done by a private radio station like Radio Radicale. Paola Carucci, councillor of the President of Italian Republic for the Historical Archive, claims:

Compared to our traditional concept of archive, that is a set of documents realized by an entity exercising its functions, Radio Radicale is a mediator of a third subject which records and creates a source produced by others. And it is astonishing that a third subject has thought, for example, about sound recordings of parliamentary debates: why Chamber and Senate have never thought about it?

The choice of Marco Pannella to preserve, catalogue and archive all the recordings without any manipulations on tapes allows the citizens to consult 430 000 documents (cassettes, tapes, mp3, mp4, RealAudio and RealVideo), which contains the most important events of the institutional, political, social and cultural history of Italy: there are full recordings which allow to everyone to know and relive an event in its entirety. The archive of the radio is in continuous expansion and receives every day tens of new documents which are added to those already existing.

=== History ===
The history of the archive is closely linked with Radio Radicale which preserved every cassette and tape of the aired programmes since its first broadcasting in 1976. However, the archive owns also some records done before 1976 and precisely 52 tapes and 216 cassettes for the period from 1967 - 1975, in addition to some tapes of 1941 (a radiophonic interview in English recovered by Ernesto Rossi where Gaetano Salvemini comments the obtaining of the American citizenship), some of 1960 (the recording of a conference held by Ernesto Rossi in Florence entitled L'antifascismo in carcere e al confino) and others of 1966 (Ernesto Rossi's Salvemini maestro ed amico).

The proper archive thought of as a service with its own specialized staff was established three years after the start of Radio activities, so that the sorting of collected recordings has started since 1979. In 1987 the classification and archive changed with the introduction of computer systems and today the analog documentation is at an advanced digitalization. The director of the archive has been Gabriella Fanello Marcucci since 1992.

=== Contents ===
Documents preserved in the Sound Archive of Radio Radicale can be classified in: Institutional Archive, Judicial Archive, Political Parties and Movements Archive, Associations, Unions and Movements Archive and Cultural Archive. The archive has a total of 430,718 recordings, 196,101 speakers and 662,404 media, including over 85,000 interviews, 21,000 hearings of the most important trials, 3,000 congresses held by parties, associations or labour unions, more than 26,000 debates and book presentations, over 6,000 political rallies and demonstrations, 19,500 press conferences and more than 13,000 conventions.

== Official website ==
Online since 1998, the website of Radio Radicale has been one of the first in Italy to stream actuality videos on the web and nowadays political, social and institutional events of the past and of recent times are always available for all the citizens.

=== History ===
Between February and March 1998, Radicals organized a convention entitled Quali lotte e leggi subito per la rivoluzione tecnologica, per la rivoluzione liberale (Which struggles and laws to be done immediately for technological revolution, for liberal revolution), attended by the major Italian entrepreneurs of ITs and telecommunications, lawyers and other specialists of that field.

During the convention, a plan of funding for the construction of a new society of information was proposed to institutions and companies, through the application of new technologies to the democratic activities. In particular, along with the introduction of the electronic vote and of the telematic official notice board, computer literacy in schools, liberalization of telematic publishing and commercial companies, the main proposal was about the online networking of public institutions.

Contents and goals of the congress formed later the foundations of RR website with the guide of Rino Spampanato; the broadcaster realized the first Italian webcast system making freely available the sessions of all the Italian Parliament's broadcast and archived sessions.

The website of Radio Radicale made possible the streaming of the sessions held by the European Parliament, Court of Audit, High Council of the Judiciary and other institutions.

=== Computer technologies ===
The website is made using mainly free software like Linux, PHP, Apache HTTP Server, Apache Solr, MariaDB, Varnish, Nginx and Icecast. It is managed with the open source CMS Drupal, published under GNU GPL licence.

All the hardware units of the content archive and distribution system are allocated in Roma into two different server farms located in the headquarter of Centro di Produzione Spa.

The first server farm holds the racks of the SAN storages with mp3/mp4 files and online distribution systems of audio and video streaming (Icecast and Wowza respectively), set up on Dell servers with the Linux OS Slackware. The SAN is formed by EMC, Dell and Qnap storages with RAID5 discs interconnected with the iSCSI technology for a total space of 170 TByte.

The second server farm is mainly dedicated to the interconnection of network devices and the supply of web services through firewall, switches and routers made by Cisco.

Both server farms have UPSs, generators sets and air conditioning systems to guarantee the management of the operative continuity at a steady temperature and humidity.

All the hardware is redundant to guarantee optimal levels of fault tolerance eliminating the main single points of failure.

The internet connection happens with two fluxes on optic fibre of 1,000 Mbit/s each from two different Internet service providers with that Centro di Produzione Spa has autonomous system relations.

To prevent control and managing activities of the computer network, Centro di Produzione Spa uses software like Nagios and Netflow which can promptly report every possible logical or functional anomaly of the services supplied.

In December 2015 the experimentation for the transition to IPv6 begun through the address assigned to Centro di Produzione by RIPE NCC. Since February 2016 the website is available in dual-stack IPv4+IPv6 with the HTTP/2 protocol.

Since 2016, Radio Radicale has used a content delivery network developed by Google through the Project Shield technology, an initiative by Google Ideas (now Jigsaw) intended to prevent possible Ddos attacks.

=== Creative Commons licence ===
All files published on the website of Radio Radicale have a Creative Commons Attribution 2.5 Italy (CC BY 2.5 IT) licence, which allows the free reproduction, distribution and adaption of the material along with the appropriate credit and the reference to the licence itself as only obligations.

CC licences represent an important instrument for the realization of the main purpose of Radio Radicale concerning the publicity of democratic decisional moments, the promotion of the access to direct knowledge about political events for the largest number of citizens and the free circulation of ideas.

=== Videoparlamento ===
The Videoparlamento service publishes on the web and makes available to citizens the full audio-video documents of all the sessions which has been done in the Chamber of Deputies and in the Senate of the Republic since November 1998.

After the live streaming, the Parliamentary sessions are shown in sheets which respect the various phases of the parliamentary work and allows a direct access to a single intervention or phase. Updating occurs in real time since September 2001. The search engine allows also to do organized searches through all available sessions. The start of the experimentations of these multimedial service was required by law n. 350 of 2003.

=== Fai Notizia ===
In 2006 the editorial board of RadioRadicale.it created FaiNotizia.it, the first Italian website of citizen journalism: based on Newsvine, it was intended as a social and journalistic experiment and an attempt to use the new free and collaborative attitude of the new media at the time, creating a new model of information.

On Fai notizia, registered users could collaborate in searching and writing the news, loading texts, videos, photos, evidencing interesting news found on other websites or blogs. Users commented and voted the reports made by other members and could start collaborative investigations. All the content had been published under Creative Commons licences.

In 2012 Fai notizia was completely renewed and transformed into a format of investigations distributed by Radio Radicale, which offers now little payments for who collaborates in creating reports about great issues of public interest.

== Funding ==
Radio Radicale receives every year a public funding of €8.33 million according to the agreement with the State for the broadcast of parliamentary sessions, and €4.431 million from the publishing funding due to its nature of branch of the Pannella List. In August 2008 Radio Radicale was the only broadcaster to be excluded from the public funds resizing for the publishing due to its nature of private radio broadcaster active according to law no. 230 of 7 August 1990.

The law recognizing "private radio broadcasters which do activities of general interest information" was approved in 1990 to recognize the radio broadcasters which had broadcast "own information programmes about political, religious, economical, social, unions related or literary events for not less than nine hours between 7 am and 20 pm" and "extended the number of plants to the 50 per cent of the provinces and the 85 per cent of the Regions".

Among with the other entities receiving public funds, Radio Radicale is the only one having a national network and spends over €3.7 million every year just for the technical management, and it is also the only one which dedicates almost all the schedule to broadcast service public programmes.

== Schedule and programmes ==
The schedule revolves around parliamentary sessions accordingly to an agreement with former Ministry of Communications (now part of Ministry of Economic Development), covering over 60% of sessions of both Houses through the 8-20 time slot. During the residual time, Radio Radicale tries to document also the activities of other institutions (Communal Councils, Court of Audit, High Council of the Judiciary, European Parliament), as well as congress, festivals and major meetings of all political parties, those organized by trade and labour unions, demonstrations, important press conferences, debates and book presentations.

News bulletins are broadcast every day and they are built around interviews and reading of news provided by press agencies.

Space dedicated to the politicians and parliamentarians in particular is a typical characteristic of RR, tough it is a party branch and so it can not respect the par condicio, and offers a certain balance across the political groups. Politicians often participate in a programme, called Filodiretto (Direct line), where they dialogue with listeners without access limitations but with only a bond of 40 seconds for each call. In recent years these programmes are reduced but the Radio invites a politician every week.

An historical programme of Radio Radicale was Conversazione settimanale con Marco Pannella (Weekly conversation with Marco Pannella), aired from 2001 to January 2016. Former director of the Radio, Massimo Bordin, (alternating with Valter Vecellio) interviewed Marco Pannella about themes regarding politics and initiatives of radicals.

At midnight there is the reading of front pages of the newspapers of the following day and this programme starts the night schedule, when events not broadcast in the daytime schedule are aired along with recordings taken and selected from the archive.

=== On Air ===
- Bollettino del Garante privacy (News bulletin of the Data Protection Authority), biweekly news bulletin about the activity of the Italian Data Protection Authority.
- Notiziario del Mattino (Morning news bulletin)
- Stampa e Regime (Press and regime), the daily press review with a critical vision of the positions taken by national newspapers about events.
- Rassegna stampa estera (Foreign press review)
- Fuor di Pagina (Out of page), press review by Associazione Radicale Certi Diritti
- Radio Carcere (Jail radio), information programme about the penal justice and detention.
- Focus Europa
- Neureka
- L'attualità in Archivio (Actuality in the archive), the political topicality read using materials from the archive of Radio Radicale.
- Albania italianofona (Italian-speaking Albania), a weekly programme from Tirana with interviews to Italian-speaking people in Albania.
- Bollettino dell'Antitrust (Antitrust news bulletin), the news bulletin about the weekly measures of the Italian Competition Authority.
- Derrick, a weekly brief programme about energy, environment and their markets.
- Fai Notizia (Do News), with insights, reportage and investigations from Italy and the world.
- Cittadini in divisa (Citizen in uniform)
- Speciale Giustizia (Judiciary special), dedicated to the world of judiciary. Mondays are dedicated to the activity of the Supreme Judiciary Council and to the events of magistrates associations. Significant trials are also broadcast in their entirety during the programme.
- Spazio Transnazionale (Transnational space)
- Notiziario antiproibizionista, (Anti-prohibitionist news bulletin), a programme about drugs and addictions.
- Adapt, in collaboration with Adapt.it and Full Professor Michele Tiraboschi.
- Il mondo a pezzi (World in pieces)
- Alta sostenibilità (High sustainability), an insight about the 17 goals for a sustainable development promoted by United Nations and the Italian Alliance for Sustainable Development.
- Due microfoni (Two microphones), nocturnal interviews with writers, actors, musicians, singers, journalists and various cultural figures.
- Capire per conoscere (Knowing for understanding), a programme about notions of economy.
- Rassegna della stampa e della blogsfera cinese (Chinese press and blog-sphere review)
- #Agricoltura? Parliamone, (#Agricolutre? Let's talk about it), a programme about the right of food, human development and social renovation from the rural world.
- Rassegna di geopolitica (Geopolitical review)
- Speciale Commissioni (Commissions special), a programme about the activity of Parliamentary Commissions.
- Passaggio a Sud Est (Passage to Southeast), weekly programme about the political situation of Southeast Europe.
- Il diritto alla conoscenza (The Right to know), about the campaign made by the Radical Party for the recognizing of the right to know.
- Overshoot, a programme about environment, territory and the limits of development.
- Osservatorio giustizia (Justice observatory)
- Fatto in Italia (Made in Italy), a weekly programme where Oliviero Toscani and Nicolas Ballario talks about a theme related to the city planning.
- Media e dintorni (Media and surroundings) a programme dedicated to events related to media.
- Rassegna stampa vaticana (Vatican press review)
- L'America Latina con Roberto Lovari (Latin America with Roberto Lovari), a look at events in the Latin America through press and television.
- Translimen, by Associazione Radicale "Esperanto"
- Troppi diritti (Too much rights)
- Forum Mediterrano
- Il Maratoneta (The Marathoner), a programme by Associazione Luca Coscioni about scientific researches
- Fortezza Italia (Italian fortress), a programme of political information and criticism and about news of immigration in Italy.
- Voci dalla Libia - Speciale Fortezza Italia (Voices from Libya - Fortezza Italia Special)
- Rassegna stampa africana (African press review)
- Rassegna stampa turca (Turkish press review)
- Cinema & Cinema, review of the "film of the week"
- L'ora di Cindia (The hour of Cindia), a programme about events in China and India.
- Il Medio Oriente visto da Gerusalemme (Middle East seen by Jerusalem)
- L'ultimo spettacolo - cinema e teatro ai tempi della crisi (The last show - Cinema and theater in the times of crisis), a programme where during each episode a reality of performance arts and shows is opposed to the economical crisis.
- Le parole e le cose (The words and the things), a programme of talk and analysis with major writers, authors and intellectuals.
- LavorareInfo (WorkInfo)
- Africa Oggi (Africa Today)
- Dei diritti e delle pene (On rights and punishments), a conversation with Elisabetta Zamparutti of the Committee for the Prevention of Torture of the European Council.
- La nuda verità (The naked truth), a programme about love, affectivity and sexuality of people with disabilities
- A che punto è la notte? (At what point Is the night?)
- Non C'è Pace Senza Giustizia (No Peace Without Justice)
- America Sociale (Social America)
- Connessioni - editoriale sull'economia (Connections - Editorial about economy), ideas for a economy of knowledge.
- Asiatica (Asian), a look into geopolitics, society, populations, rights, economy of the Asian continent.
- Maestri (Masters), portraits of "remarkable masters".
- RadicalNonviolentNews
- Il rovescio del diritto (The reverse of law), by the “Comitato radicale per la giustizia Piero Calamandrei”.
- Scegliere il futuro (Choosing the future), about knowledge instruments for choosing the future
- Partito Radicale: trasmissione autogestita (Radical Party: Self-managed broadcast)
- Voci africane (African voices), by the Movement of Africans
- Critica e militanti (Criticism and militants)
- Lo stato del diritto (The state of right)
- Diario di iniziativa radicale (Diary of a radical initiative)
- Agenda settimanale delle Istituzioni (Weekly agenda of institutions), a programme about principal events in the week regarding institutions, international field and economy.
- Visto dall'America (Seen by America), a weekly programme about international politics according to the United States.
- In dialogo (Dialoguing)
- Quota 3001
- Ricerca e futuro (Research and future), a weekly programme of information by Lorenzo Fioramonti, deputy Minister of Education, Universities and Research of the Conte Cabinet.
- L'Italia in crisi (Italy in crisis)
- Fortezza Europa (Fortress Europe), an observatory on European and Italian politics on immigration.
- Lettere eretiche (Eretical mails)
- AgiChina
- Le petizioni online su Change.org (Online Petitions on Change.org), a weekly interview with the promoter of an online petition of the Italian version of Change.org.
- UNPO
- Divorziobreve.it, a programme about initiatives for brief divorce
- Musulmane laiche (Laical Muslim Women), by the League of Laical Muslim Women.
- Italiani per sbaglio (Italians by mistake), a monthly programme by Valter Vecellio and Gianmarco Pondrano about liberal/radical figures.
- Le ragioni personali (Personal reasons)
- Rassegna stampa culturale (Cultural press review)
- Set - Cinema fuoricampo (Set - Off-screen cinema)
- Dietro le parole (Behind the words)
- LAB 4.0, a laboratory and observatory about Industry 4.0 and sharing economy.
- Diplomatic, a conversation with the editor of La Stampa Maurizio Molinari about main international dossiers.
- Potere pubblico e giustizia amministrativa (Public power and administrative justice)
- Radio Europa (Radio Europe), a programme broadcast in collaboration with the Italian representative of the European Commission.
- Oikonomia
- Presi per il web (Taken for the web)
- Il Medio Oriente visto dal Cairo (Middle East seen from Cairo)
- Public policy
- Benelux e dintorni (Benelux and surroundings)
- Notiziario della guerra e della droga (War and drug News Bulletin)

=== Closed ===
- Conversazione settimanale con Marco Pannella (Weekly conversation with Marco Pannella)
- Filodiretto del lunedì (Direct line of Monday), weekly programme for a direct line with a politician without filters.
- Filodiretto del lunedì notte (Direct line of Monday night), dedicated to listeners about initiatives and themes related to the Italian Radicals.
- Blogroll, a review of blogs analysing and commenting events of the week.
- Controluce (Backlight)
- Catallassi, weekly insight about economy.
- Rond Point Schumann, a programme made with the contribution of the European Commission
- Sudamericana (South American), weekly press review of Latin America.
- La nota di politica interna di Iuri Maria Prado. (Internal politics note by Iuri Maria Prado)
- Generazione elle (L Generation), a programme of Radio Radicale made along with the webmagazine "Generazione Elle".
- Media dossier, dedicated to the situation of media in Italy
- La rassegna delle prime pagine dei quotidiani internazionali (Press review of first pages of foreign newspapers)
- Il lessico dell'economia (The lexicon of economy)
- Vincino l'impresentabile (Vincino the unpresentable), the week seen by satirical cartoonist Vincino.
- Supplemento economico di Stampa e Regime (Economical supplement of press and regime), the daily financial press review.
- Staminali e dintorni (Stem cells and surroundings)
- Buddhismo in occidente (Buddhism in the West)
- Speciale Global (Global special), a weekly programme about geopolitics.
- Notiziario Aids (AIDS News Bulletin)

Since 1980, Radio Radicale has broadcast pieces of requiems during the breaks between programmes as a symbol of mourning, and protest, in front of deaths for hunger which occurs every day. The most used are those from the Requiem in D minor, composed by W. A. Mozart, but other classical music pieces are broadcast, like the Dies Irae from Messa da Requiem by Giuseppe Verdi and rarely the Sanctus from the Requiem by Gabriel Fauré.

== See also ==
- Marco Pannella
- Partito Radicale
- Radicali Italiani
