= Virgin Radio Italia =

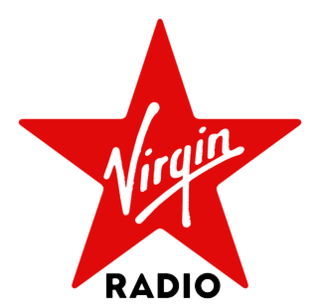
- Italy
- Broadcast area: Italy; Monaco; San Marino; Croatia; Slovenia
- Frequencies: FM: multiple frequencies DAB+: multiple frequencies SKY Italia Channel 700; DVB-S: Hotbird 13C; DVB-S2: Eutelsat 9B

Programming
- Format: Rock music

Ownership
- Owner: Mediaset
- Sister stations: Radio 105 Network; Radio Monte Carlo

History
- First air date: July 12, 2007

Links
- Webcast: Listen live
- Website: www.virginradio.it

Virgin Radio is a music-based Italian radio station, which started nationwide broadcasting on 12 July 2007 at 12:00 AM (with the song "What a Wonderful World" by Joey Ramone). It is owned by Mediaset and the programming consists of rock music (rockabilly, hard rock, punk rock, rock and roll and more).

== Virgin Radio TV ==
Virgin Radio TV was an Italian music television channel, launched on 30 November 2010. Freely available on selected local digital terrestrial television networks in Italy and on Hotbird 8, feature a separate programming and music playlist from his radio counterpart. On 1 August 2012 it ceased broadcasting only in digital terrestrial television.
