= Rai Gr Parlamento =

- Italy
- Broadcast area: Italy - Some Areas DAB/FM, Hot Bird & Internet

Programming
- Format: News, talk, and politics

Ownership
- Owner: RAI

History
- First air date: 5 January 1998; 28 years ago
- Former names: GR Politica Parlamento (1998–2000)

Links
- Webcast: RealMedia
- Website: http://www.grparlamento.rai.it/

Rai Gr Parlamento is an Italian radio channel devoted to live coverage of proceedings in the Italian Parliament (Chamber of Deputies and Senate), the Presidency of the Italian Republic, the European Parliament, and Regional and some Communal Councils. It was launched in 1998 by RAI and the Italian Ministry of Communications.

Transmissions are on FM, DAB, Hot Bird frequencies, and via RealMedia live audio streaming.

When there is no political or info programming, from 21:00 till 07:00 hrs, Rai GR Parlamento delays Rai Radio Tutta Italiana with Italian music.

== Scheduling ==
- Sinai, (religion) hosted by Pier Luigi Gregori and Gianpietro Olivetto
- Radio 7, hosted by Aldo Papa
- Pop Politics, (entertainment) hosted by Angelo Mellone
- Pagine in frequenza, (books) hosted by Alessandro Forlani
- Le Regole del Gusto, (cooking) hosted by Gerardo Antelmo
- La Politica nel Pallone, (soccer) hosted by Emilio Mancuso
- L'altro Sport, (sports) hosted by Roberto Imbastaro
- In nome della Legge, (laws) hosted by Gianfranco D'Anna
- Il Parlamento e le Arti, (arts) hosted by Roberta Ammendola
- Economia in Aula, (economics) hosted by Paolo Corsini
- Clima, (ecology) hosted by Gaetano Giordano
- Articolo 32, (health) hosted by Gerardo D'Amico
- Agorà, hosted by Anna Notariello

== Logos ==
2000–2010	2015	2015–2017	2017–present

== See also ==
- RAI
- Camera dei Deputati (TV channel)
- Senato Italiano (TV channel)
