= Radio Capital =

Private Italian radio station

- Italy
- Broadcast area: Italy - National FM, Satellite Radio, DVB-T and DAB.
- Frequencies: FM several frequencies, change from geographical side to side SKY Italia channel 713 tivùsat channel 622

Programming
- Format: Classic Hits/Adult Contemporary/News/Talk.

Ownership
- Owner: Gruppo Editoriale L'Espresso, EXOR (Agnelli)
- Sister stations: Radio DeeJay, m2o

History
- First air date: 1977

Links
- Webcast: Windows Media
- Website: www.capital.it

Radio Capital is an Italian private radio station, was founded in May 1977 and is owned by the Gruppo Editoriale L'Espresso (ultimately by EXOR owned by the Agnelli-family) and began broadcasting in 1985.

Broadcast FTA on Hot Bird, on SKY Italia channel 713 and on tivùsat channel 622.

== Programming ==
- Capital Party (hosted by Andrea Prezioso)
- Risponde Zucconi (hosted by Vittorio Zucconi)
