= Radio 24 (Italy) =

- First logo from 1999 to 2016

Italy
- Broadcast area: Italy, Albania, Austria, Croatia, Slovenia, Switzerland - National FM & Satellite
- Frequencies: FM several frequencies, change from geographical side to side SKY Italia Channel 700

Programming
- Format: All-news

Ownership
- Owner: Il Sole 24 Ore

Links
- Webcast: ,
- Website: radio24.it

Radio 24 is an Italian national radio station mainly devoted to news, founded on 4 October 1999. It is owned by the editorial group Gruppo 24 ORE, which also owns the newspaper Il Sole 24 Ore.
