= Radio 105 =

- Italy
- Broadcast area: FM frequencies in Italy and Monaco, DAB, DVB-T, DVB-H, DVB-S on Hotbird and worldwide with internet streaming

Programming
- Format: Pop and Urban contemporary

Ownership
- Owner: Mediaset

History
- First air date: 16 February 1976

Links
- Website: www.105.net

Radio 105 is an Italian private radio station, owned by Mediaset, who also owns Virgin Radio Italia and Radio Monte Carlo. It was founded on 1976 as Radio Studio 105.
