= Radio DeeJay =

Italy
- Broadcast area: FM frequencies in Italy, Switzerland and Monaco; DTT and DAB in Italy; satellite worldwide
- Frequencies: FM several frequencies, change from geographical side to side SKY Italia Channel 700; Alice Home TV Channel 774

Programming
- Format: Music radio

Ownership
- Owner: Elemedia, GEDI, Exor

History
- First air date: 1 February 1982; 44 years ago

Links
- Webcast: Real Media Windows Media
- Website: www.deejay.it

Radio DeeJay is an Italian radio station. It was founded on 1 February 1982 by the Italian radio and television personality Claudio Cecchetto and was acquired by the Gruppo Editoriale L'Espresso (GEDI) in 1989. In 2020, Exor (belonging to the Agnelli family) became the owner of GEDI and consequently of Radio DeeJay.

== TV channel ==
From the end of 2000, on the satellite platform began broadcasting DeeJay TV.

The TV channel, under the artistic guidance of Linus, was visible from all over Europe until 2003, the year in which the issuer becomes part of the Sky package and coding their own programs. In October 2009, the channel broadcasts in plain-text, replacing the All Music channel on its frequency. On the Sky platform, the MyDeejay channel is broadcast instead.

== See also ==
- Kataweb
- Carlo De Benedetti
