= R101 (Italy) =

- Italy
- Frequencies: FM: Various nationwide; SKY Italia: Channel 700

Programming
- Format: Adult contemporary

Ownership
- Owner: Mediaset

History
- First air date: March 10, 1975
- Former names: Radio Milano International; 101 Network; Radio 101; One-O-One

Links
- Website: www.r101.it

R101 (formerly Radio Milano International, 101 Network, Radio 101, One-O-One, and Radio 101, current name since June 6, 2005) is an Italian radio station that broadcasts adult contemporary music and news bulletins from TG5 and TGCOM.

It is headquartered in Milan, Italy and is owned by RadioMediaset.

== History ==
The station started broadcasting on March 10, 1975 as Radio Milano International, one of the first, if not, chronologically the first, private radio stations in Italy. The station used a truck to avoid being intercepted by Escopost, the Postal Police. It was founded by two couples of brothers: Angelo and Rino Borra and Piero and Nino Cozzi, all Milanese, with a median age of around twenty years.The founders acquired a used military transmitter and set up the studio Piero's bedroom, located at Locatelli 1 Street (close to Piazza della Repubblica). In this format, with an investment of one million lira, they started broadcasting from 27 MHz (citizens band) and later 101 MHz in FM.

On April 15, 1975 the transmitter was put under siege by the authorities because it was not regularly registered. Broadcasts restarted ten days later, when magistrate Cassare accepted the appeal in defense of the radio station.

Radio Milano International was audible in a 40 km radius, being financed by commercial advertising, although rumors had emerged that the station was funded by CIA, suspicions caused by the tense political and ideological climate of the Years of Lead. The station registered an immediate success; after a month, Claudio Cecchetto arrived, disc-jockey of Panthea, one of the most notorious disco houses of the period. Years later, figures like Gerry Scotti and Gigio D'Ambrosio joined the station's microphones.

From 1977, for some time, Radio Milano International also tried television production with Milano International TV, seeking to attract public airing lots of red light movies. In 1987, its broadcasts covered all of the national territory and the station changed its name to 101 Network, later Radio 101 and finally, the current R101.

In 2002, Radio 101 announced the FM return of the Radio Milano International brand, with a local metropolitan project on a redundant frequency of the group.

== Programmes ==
- La Carica di 101
- Sportello Centounico
- La Ricarica di 101
- Mitico!
- Molto Personale
- Prima di tutti
- Gli Stereotipi
- Musicology
- Il Viaggio
- Sabato Italiano
- Superclassifica
- Disco 101
- Molto Personale Hot
- La Domenica degli Sportivi
- I raccattapalle
- Club '80
- Club '90
- Club 101
- Uno per Uno
- Smile - Gli italiani fanno ridere
- Gran riserva
- Sabato stereotipico
- Alta fedeltà
- Il sabato dello sportello
- Scatta in meta

== Personalities ==
- Marco Balestri
- Paolo Cavallone
- Alberto Davoli
- Dario Desi
- Paolo Dini
- Tamara Donà
- Lester
- Massimo Lopez
- Chiara Lorenzutti
- Max Novaresi
- Federica Panicucci
- Gerry Scotti
- Sergio Sironi
- Laura Basile
- Cristiano Militello
- Laura Basile
- Elisa Dante
- Claudio Cecchetto
