= RTL 102.5 =

- Italy
- Broadcast area: Italy – National FM, DAB, DVB-T, Satellite and Internet
- Frequencies: FM several frequencies, change from geographical side to side (generally 102.500 MHz); SKY Italia Channel 750

Programming
- Format: Contemporary hit radio

Ownership
- Owner: RTL 102.5 Hit Radio S.r.l.

History
- First air date: 1975

Links
- Webcast: Flash e MP3
- Website: www.rtl.it

RTL 102.5 is a private Italian radio station. Despite its name, this radio station is not endorsed or affiliated with RTL Group (it is owned by Lorenzo Suraci, and RTL is an acronym of Radio Trasmissioni Lombarde (Lombardy Radio Broadcasting), the original name of this station).

It has been the first Italian radio station using the contemporary hit radio format, which involves the broadcasting of greatest hits only.

The RTL 102.5 group also includes the advertising agency Openspace and the satellite television channel RTL 102.5 TV (formerly Hit Channel) where the whole radio schedule is broadcast.

The slogan of the radio station is Very normal people.

== History ==
RTL 102.5 originated in Bergamo in 1975 as Radio Trasmissioni Lombarde ("Lombardy Radio Broadcasting"). Lorenzo Suraci, the current president, took it over in 1988 to advertise his Capriccio discothèque in Arcene, near Bergamo. Rapidly RTL's signal was extended in the whole North of Italy. Then, Suraci tested the national isofrequency to make RTL receivable in the whole of Italy on the same frequency, 102.5 MHz. In 1990 it became one of the 14 Italian national networks. It has been the first private Italian radio station creating its own editorial structure, now directed by Luigi Tornari.

The headquarters are in Cologno Monzese, in the first building in Europe created especially for radio. RTL 102.5 also has an office in Rome, in via Virginio Orsini, near the Piazza del Popolo, which houses part of the editorial staff, recording rooms and the studio from which programs like Onorevole DJ and Chi c'è c'è, chi non c'è non parla are broadcast.

Music & Media reported in April 1994, that RTL 102.5 was revamping its broadcasting schedule to be more risky.

In July 1995, Billboard rated RTL 102.5 in their Top 10 Italian private radio networks with a daily audience of 3.29 million. Billboard reported in June 1996, that RTL 102.5 had been more focused on Adult contemporary music in the last year and 50% of their music had been from Italian acts and 50% had been from international acts. In March 1997, RTL 102.5's managing director, Lorenzo Suraci, denied allegations from the government of payola by Italy's record companies and radio stations. In December 2008, Suraci dismissed complaints that RTL 102.5 did not play enough songs by Italian record labels.

RTL 102.5 radio also owns a music television wing, RTL 102.5 TV.

== Presenters ==
Presenters currently on RTL 102.5:

- Alberto Bisi
- Alessandro Greco
- Amadeus
- Andrea De Sabato
- Andrea Pamparana
- Andrea Salvati
- Angelo Baiguini
- Angelo Di Benedetto
- Armando Piccolillo
- Barbara Sala
- Bruno Vespa
- Carletto
- Carlo Elli
- Charlie Gnocchi
- Conte Galé
- Cristina Borra
- Davide Giacalone
- Fabio Santini
- Fabrizio Ferrari
- Federico Vespa
- Fernando Proce
- Francesca Cheyenne
- Fulvio Giuliani
- Gabriele Parpiglia
- Gigio D'Ambrosio
- Giorgia Surina
- Giorgio Ginex
- Giusi Legrenzi
- Harold Davies
- Il Trio
- Jennifer Pressman
- La Zac
- Laura Ghislandi
- Luca Dondoni
- Max Viggiani
- Myriam Fecchi
- Nicoletta Deponti
- Nino Mazzarino
- Paolo Cavallone
- Pierluigi Diaco
- Pio e Amedeo
- Roberto Uggeri
- Sara Ventura
- Silvia Annichiarico
- Valeria Benatti

Former Radio Caroline presenter Grant Benson also worked for the station in the nineties.

From 2005 to November 2007 the station manager was Roberto Zaino. Before that, his predecessor was Luca Viscardi.

== News Correspondent Network ==
RTL 102.5's News Correspondent Network, set up in August 1991, was a first in the history of national private radio in Italy. To date, it has received numerous accolades and awards for the quality and standard of its reporting.

The team consists of 16 journalists and 120 correspondents located in all major Italian cities, with the five primary editorial offices in Milan, Rome, Naples, Turin and Palermo. Additionally, there are correspondents in other major European cities like London, Paris, Berlin, Athens, Dublin, Monte Carlo and Moscow. Internationally, there are bureaux in the United States (New York and Los Angeles) and Lima, Peru.

The Milan editorial staff consists of Fulvio Giuliani, Paolo Pacchioni, Ivana Faccioli, Sergio Gadda, Alessandra Giannoli, Jolanda Granato, Giusi Legrenzi, Jennifer Pressman, Giovanni Perria, Antonella Rocchi, Andrea Salvati and Max Viggiani. The Rome editorial staff consists of Alberto Ciapparoni, Gabriele Manzo, Maria Paola Raiola and Federico Vespa.
