= Radio Kiss Kiss =

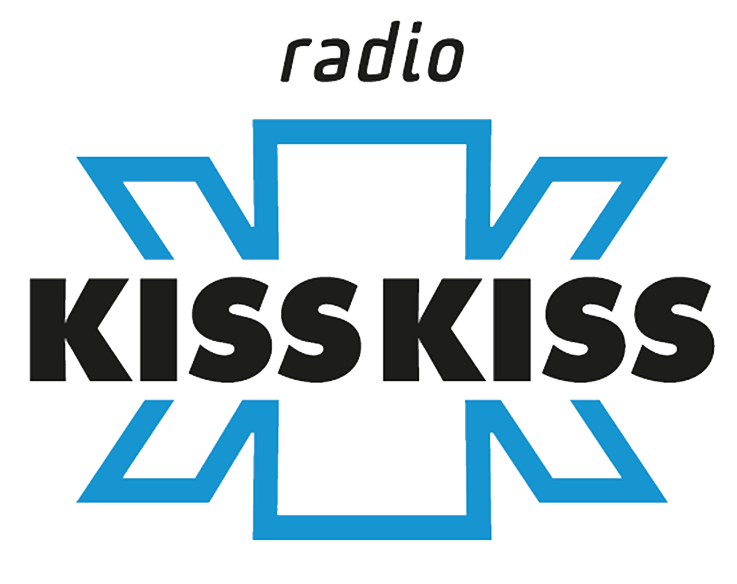
- Italy
- Broadcast area: Italy; Monaco; National FM and DAB (only in Italy), Satellite on Hotbird (FTA), available also on SKY Italia and Internet
- Frequencies: FM several frequencies, change from geographical side to side SKY Italia Channel 700

Programming
- Format: Music radio

History
- First air date: September 12, 1976

Links
- Webcast: Windows Media
- Website: http://www.kisskiss.it/

Radio Kiss Kiss is an Italian commercial radio station and one of the first radio stations aired from Naples. Based in Naples, with two offices, in Rome and Milan, this radio station is devoted to soul, funk and disco music.
