= Tellevent =

Telephonic newspaper experiment

The Tellevent (also spelled Televent), established by James F. Land, was the first organized attempt to develop a subscription news and entertainment "telephone newspaper" service in the United States. Although a number of tests over telephone lines were made throughout Michigan from 1906 to 1908, and the company hoped to eventually expand nationally, it never advanced beyond the exploratory stage.

== History ==
The Tellevent's name came from a contraction of the phrase: "It tells the event to mind's eye." Its main inspiration came from two existing telephone-based subscriber services: the Paris Théâtrophone, which began operation in 1890 and primarily offered live entertainment from local theaters, and the Telefon Hírmondó of Budapest, Hungary, which was established in 1893 and featured a broad range of news and entertainment.

It was reported in January 1906 that the Michigan State Telephone Company, which held the state's Bell Telephone franchise, was conducting "fairly successful" tests in distributing programs "between the theatres, the churches, the Light Guard Armory, the new Penobscot Inn and the residences of several officials of the company", with hopes that "eventually a new use for the telephone will be developed along these lines". The next month, Michigan State Telephone's general manager, James F. Land, credited as the inventor, reported a "most satisfactory" test transmitting a church service and concert in Detroit to a party of Grand Rapids people, located 150 miles (240 kilometers) away. Additional tests followed, including both the 1906 and 1907 May Festivals held by Michigan State University in Ann Arbor. Another report stated that two days of Senatorial Caucus speeches 88 miles (141 kilometers) distant at Lansing had been successfully transmitted to multiple Detroit homes.

March 1907 saw the formation of the American Tellevent Company, incorporated in Michigan and capitalized at $300,000, with the initial officials of E. L. Ford, W. A. Jackson, George M. Black, Arnold A. Schantz, James H. Swart and James F. Land. In July 1907, Land resigned as the Michigan State Telephone Company's general manager, where he had worked for nearly 30 years, in order to spend full-time with the recently founded Michigan Tellevent Company, of which he was the majority stockholder.

A glowing review in the March 17, 1907, issue of the Detroit Free Press, "'Televent,' Latest Wonder of Electric Science", described the expansive goals of the Tellevent promoters. The service was designed to use subscriber's existing telephone lines, and had been initially installed in 100 Detroit homes, connecting them with local theaters. However, it was planned that in the future, "there will be a televent at the stock exchange, banks, at the band concerts on Belle Isle, race track, club houses, hotels, library, political headquarters, court rooms, in short, wherever the public wishes to go". An extensive daily program was also envisioned, starting with "Daily News" at 7:00 a.m., followed by time blocks featuring additional news, stock, and weather reports, assorted special features, a children's hour, then two hours of dinner music, and closing at 11:00 p.m. with three hours of "Grand opera from distant points". Subscription costs were estimated to be around $2 a month, with service provided to private homes, businesses, hotels, and hospitals. Also planned was the option to connect to special services, such as ballgames and speeches.

Tellevent promotional illustration (1907)

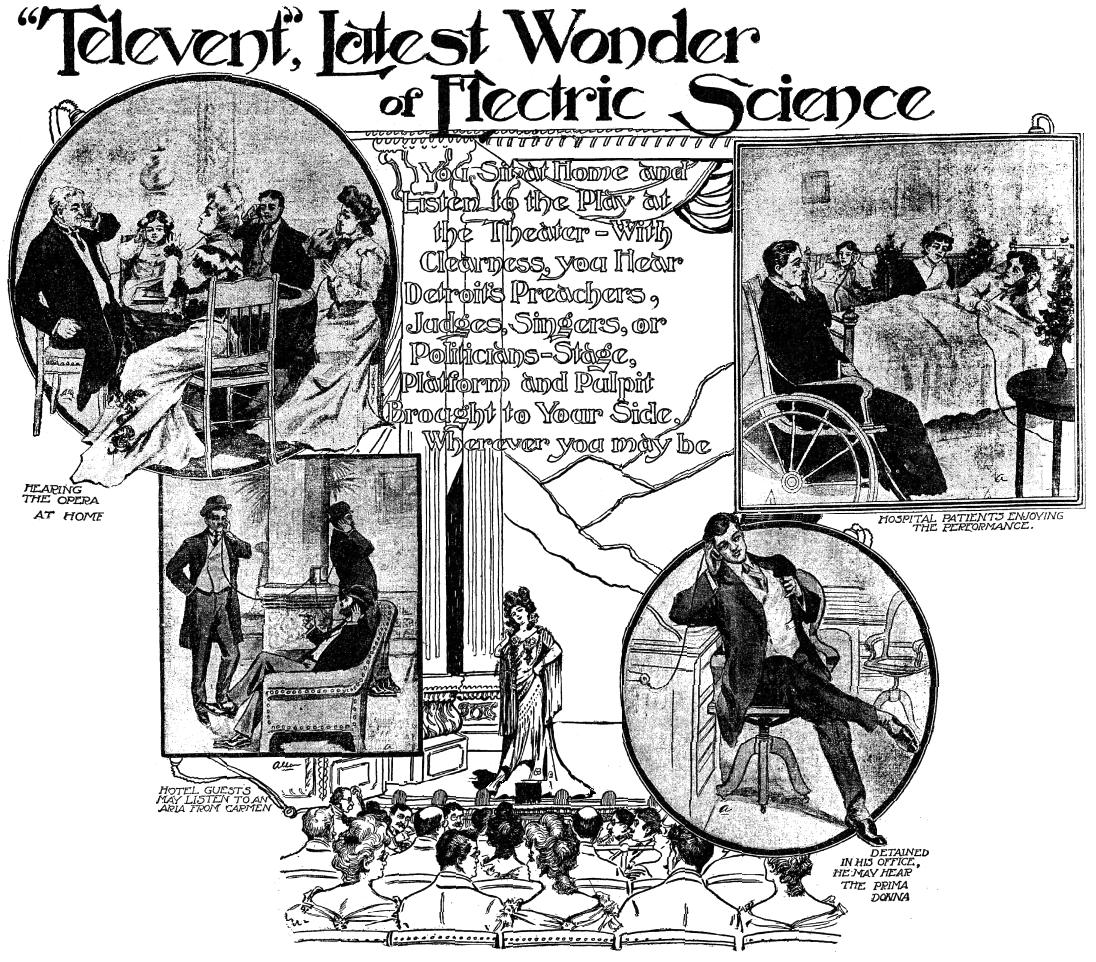
Individuals listening to an opera over the proposed system at home and work, and in a hospital and at a hotel.

Despite the promoters' enthusiasm, it appears that the Tellevent service never went into wider use. Individual reports of test transmissions continued to appear through 1908, but the Michigan Tellevent Company was dissolved on August 2, 1909.

Later efforts in the United States that had similar goals to the Tellevent included the Wilmington, Delaware, Tel-musici, beginning in 1909, a collection of Telephone Herald companies, from 1911 to 1913, and the Chicago Musolaphone in 1913. However, none of these systems achieved financial success, and the idea of using telephone lines for news and entertainment systems would be eclipsed by the development of radio broadcasting in the early 1920s.
