= United States Telephone Herald Company =

The United States Telephone Herald Company, founded in 1909, was the parent corporation for a number of associated "telephone newspaper" companies, located throughout the United States, that were organized to provide news and entertainment over telephone lines to subscribing homes and businesses. This was the most ambitious attempt to develop a distributed audio service prior to the rise of radio broadcasting in the early 1920s.

At least a dozen associate companies were chartered, but despite initial optimism and ambitious goals, only two systems ever went into commercial operation — one based in Newark, New Jersey (New Jersey Telephone Herald, 1911-1912) and the other in Portland, Oregon (Oregon Telephone Herald, 1912-1913). Moreover, both of these systems were shut down after operating for only a short time, due to economic and technical issues.

Corporation activity peaked in 1913, but the lack of success caused the company to suspend operations, and the corporation charter for the United States Telephone Herald Company was repealed in early 1918.

== Company history ==
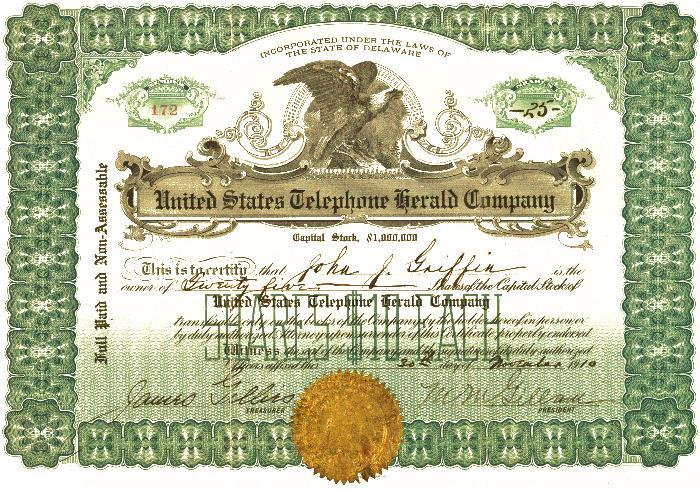
United States Telephone Herald Company stock certificate (1910).

The United States Telephone Herald Company was an authorized offshoot of the Telefon Hírmondó audio service of Budapest, Hungary. The Telefon Hírmondó programming, transmitted to subscribers over telephone wires, consisted of an extensive selection of news during the day, followed by instruction and entertainment during the evening. This "news-teller" service began operation in February 1893, shortly before the death of its inventor, Tivadar Puskás.

Following a visit to Hungary, Cornelius Balassa procured the U.S. patent rights to the Telefon Hírmondó technology. (Later reports state that the company also held the rights for Canada and Great Britain. Another group obtained the rights for Italy, where in 1910 they established the service under the name Araldo Telefonico). The formation of a parent U.S. company, initially operating under a New York state charter as the "Telephone Newspaper Company of America", was announced in October 1909, with organizing directors Manley M. Gillam (president), William H. Alexander (secretary and treasurer), and Cornelius Balassa, all of New York City. In March 1910, the parent company was reorganized as the "United States Telephone Herald Company", now operating as a Delaware-chartered corporation.

An initial demonstration transmission was given at the company headquarters, located at 110 West Thirty-fourth Street in New York City, in early September 1910. The equipment used was similar to that which was employed in Budapest. As in Hungary, announcers were called "stentors", and because vacuum tube technology had not been developed yet, there were limited methods for amplification, so to compensate the stentors had to speak as loudly as possible into oversized dual-microphones. The lack of amplification also meant that subscribers needed to listen through headphones instead of loudspeakers. On February 14, 1911 U.S. patent 984,235, describing "a telephone system... adapted for supplying innumerable subscribers... general news, musical compositions, and operas, sermons, correct or standard time and other happenings at stated intervals of day and night" was granted to Árpád Németh, and assigned to the company.

Regionally-based Telephone Herald affiliates were authorized for the purpose of creating local "telephone newspaper" systems, with "the parent company to receive a royalty on every instrument installed". But ultimately the parent company and its affiliates proved financially unsuccessful, and the United States Telephone Herald Company began winding down operations. Its Delaware business charter was repealed on January 28, 1918, for failure to pay state corporate taxes for two years.

=== Telephone Herald associate companies ===
At least twelve Telephone Herald associate companies were formed, although in only two cases was a telephone newspaper service successfully launched: the New Jersey Telephone Herald (1911-1912) and the Oregon Telephone Herald (1912-1913). (In some cases the service was also referred to as the "telectrophone".)

Each associate company was established by local owners operating under a state-granted business charter. Publicity for these services commonly stated that the telephone newspaper subscriptions would cost 5 cents a day. (For comparison, at this time a copy of the daily Oregonian newspaper in Portland also cost 5 cents.) However, a majority of the associate companies got no further than the promotion or demonstration stages.

In addition to twelve known associate companies, early company publicity stated that installations would also be set up in Chicago, Scranton, Pennsylvania and Montreal, Canada, but systems do not appear to have been established at any of these locations. Also, a December 15, 1912 advertisement for the Central California Telephone Herald listed associate Telephone Herald companies with company names located at New York, Chicago, New Orleans, Seattle-Tacoma, Columbia (British Columbia and Alberta, Canada), Los Angeles and Oakland, but there is no information for these either.

== Associate companies that launched telephone newspapers ==
=== New Jersey Telephone Herald Co. (Newark) ===
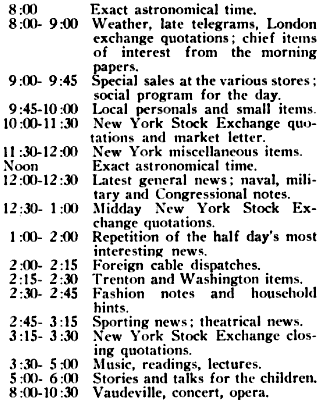
New Jersey Telephone Herald's daily schedule (1912)

Of the two Telephone Herald affiliates which launched commercial services, the New Jersey Telephone Herald was both the first and most publicized. The company had been incorporated in October 1910 in the state of New Jersey by Eugene Gorenflo, Duncan McIsaac and Nicholas J. Surgess.

The original plan was to begin operations in March 1911, however, the New York Telephone Company, which operated the Newark telephone system franchise, initially refused to lease telephone lines to the Telephone Herald, on the grounds that their charter did not permit it. It required a ruling by the Public Utility Commission to compel the telephone company to provide the needed wires. The hiring process for the stentors, who worked as the news readers, was competitive and rigorous. According to one of the original stentors, the position was restricted to "college men" with strong voices and extensive vocabularies. Throughout the day four stentors announced during rotating shifts of 15 minutes each, and did staff work when they were not announcing.

An ambitious daily service, closely patterned after the Telefon Hírmondó, was launched in October 1911, transmitting to fifty receivers located in a department store waiting room plus five hundred Newark homes. The company's central offices, studio, and switch rooms were located in the Essex Building on Clinton Street in Newark. Condit S. Atkinson, who had extensive newspaper experience, headed the service's news department.

The company reported that there were many persons eager to sign up with the innovative service, and it soon had more potential subscribers than could be supported. One young listener later remembered that "it was a great thrill to pick up the small receiver and hear a voice telling about world events", moreover, "It was such a novelty that I could scarcely wait to get home from school and listen to it. It fascinated me. I would listen as long as it was operative, or until I was called to do my homework." One of the program features was a series of original "Trippertrot" stories, written by local children's author Howard R. Garis, which were later assembled into two book collections: Three Little Trippertrots and Three Little Trippertrots on Their Travels, published in 1912.

Despite the enthusiastic response, the company soon ran into serious technical and financial difficulties. Due to a revenue crisis, which resulted in employees walking off the job due to missed paychecks, the service was suspended in late February 1912. A replenishment of funding resulted in a temporary revival in late May, with the primary company officials now consisting of Percy Pyne (president), William E. Gunn (vice-president and general manager), and C. E. Danforth (secretary-treasurer), with C. S. Atkinson renewing his editor functions. The service, now calling itself the "telectrophone", was relaunched in November, however, this would only be a temporary respite, and the telephone newspaper transmissions shut down for good at the end of the year.

A later review suggested that the primary issue was technical, as the twisted pair phone lines used for the Newark operation had different electrical characteristics than the wiring used by the original Telefon Hírmondó plant. Following the permanent suspension of services, the New Jersey Telephone Herald's business charter was declared null and void on January 18, 1916.

Publicity photographs for the New Jersey Telephone Herald (Newark, 1912)

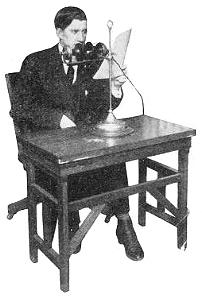
Stentor (news reader)

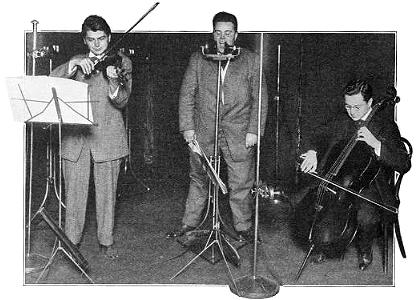
Entertainers

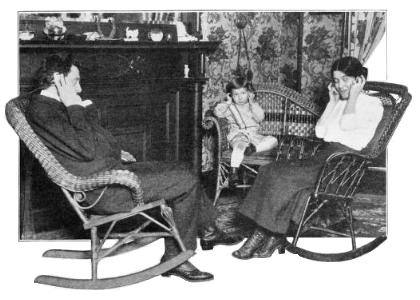
Home listeners

=== Oregon Telephone Herald Co. (Portland) ===
Although less well known than the New Jersey affiliate, the second Telephone Herald company to implement an ongoing telephone newspaper service was the Oregon Telephone Herald Company. But like its predecessor, it also soon faced financial difficulties and was short-lived. The company was incorporated in Oregon, and headquartered at 506 Royal Building (Seventh and Morrison) in Portland. Extensive demonstrations were begun in May 1912, and advertisements the next month said commercial service would start "around October 1st".

A January 1913 solicitation for home subscribers for "The Talking Newspaper and Amusement Purveyor" listed the hours of operation as 8:00 AM to midnight. Later advertisements referred to the service as the "Te-Lec-Tro-Phone", and in April saw the introduction of the reporting of local Portland Beavers baseball games. (In December, a Northwestern League representative complained that the service had hurt attendance, and supported "the ousting of the various telephone herald and signalling systems from the ball parks"). A promotion the following month offered the chance to hear election results for free at twenty-five business sites. In May, the Portland Hotel advertised that diners could listen to "the latest baseball, business and other news by Telephone-Herald" with their meals.

There appears to have been a company reorganization in early 1913, and in March two representatives from the parent company, including chief electrical engineer Árpád Németh, were reported in town to give technical advice. But as with its New Jersey predecessor, the Portland enterprise was in trouble. During the summer, Oregon Corporation Commissioner R. A. Watson stepped in, and, under provisions of the state's "Blue Sky Law", barred the Oregon Telephone Herald from doing business, stating that "There was no question about the honesty of this concern, but the scheme isn't practical, and while it might be popular for a short time it would be a failure in the end; therefore, we refused them a permit to sell stock."

The final advertisements for the company appeared in June 1913, and the state corporation charter was terminated on January 16, 1917, for failure to file statements or pay fees for two years.

Advertisements for the Oregon Telephone Herald (Portland)

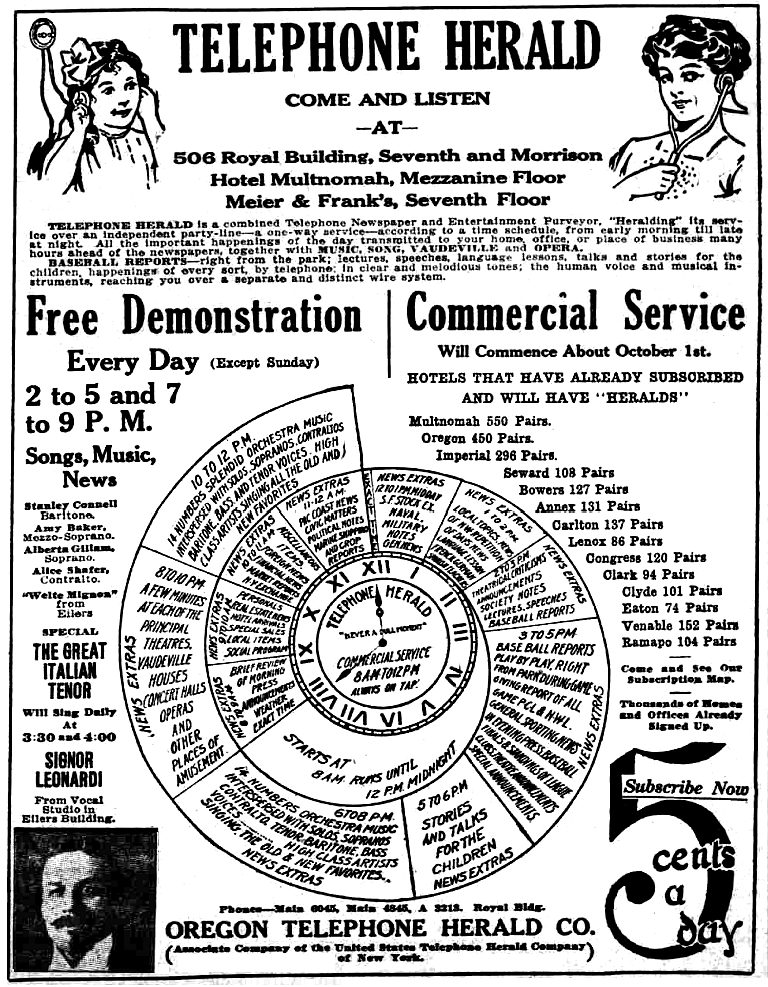
Demonstrations (1912)

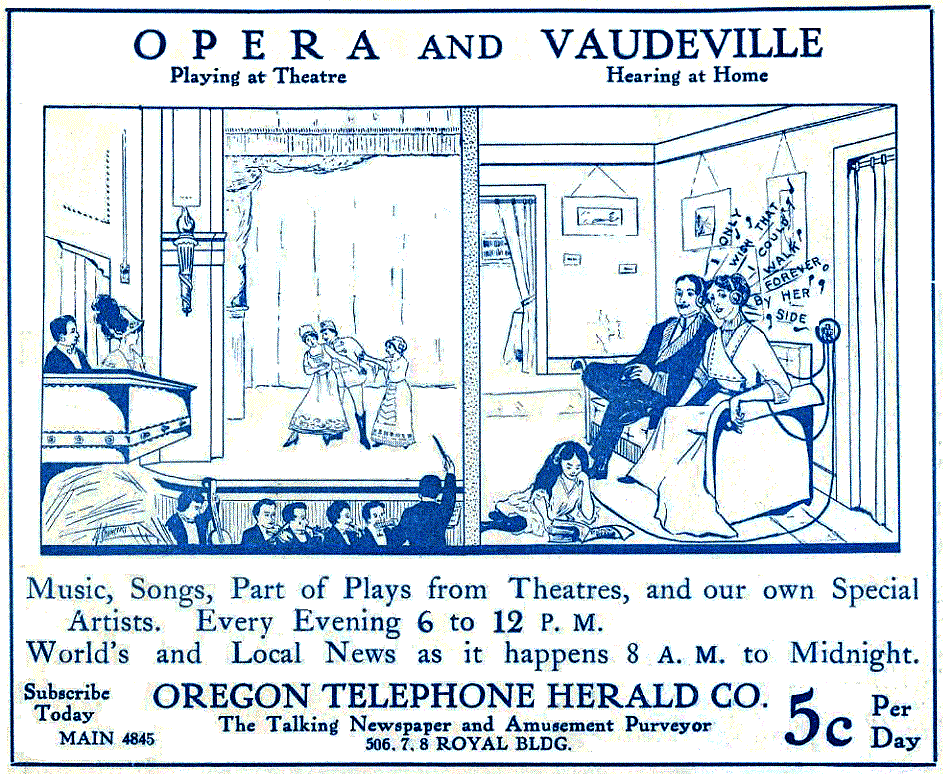
Home subscribers (1913)

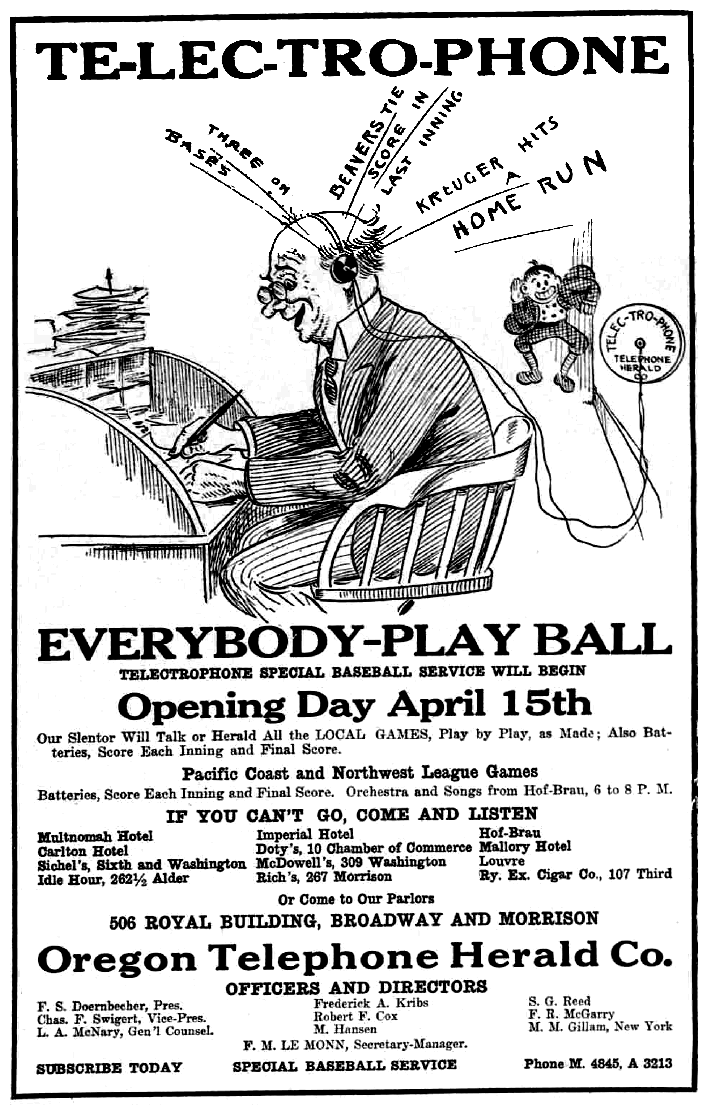
Baseball reports (1913)

== Other associate companies ==
None of the other ten Telephone Herald associate companies launched their proposed telephone newspaper systems, although there were widely varying levels of plans and activities.

=== Boston Telephone Herald Syndicate, Inc. ===
Incorporated in Massachusetts on April 23, 1913, by Ladislaus de Doory (president), John M. Grosvenor, Jr. (treasurer), and Jesse W. Morton. De Doory was also a promoter with the parent company. However, the syndicate does not appear to have made any demonstrations or other significant development, and its business charter was dissolved on February 21, 1916.

=== California Telephone Herald Co. (San Francisco) ===
This was the first of two companies that were headquartered in San Francisco, California. The company received a California business charter in February 1911, issued to G. S. Holbrook, W. A. Whelan, W. B. Heckmann, A. H. Vorrath, R. M. Graham, R. Boreman, William T. Newverth, A. C. Gould and A. Jacoby.

Demonstrations were conducted in September 1911 at 821, 822, 823 Head Building, but no further progress appears to have been made, and the company charter was declared forfeited and repealed for non-payment of taxes in February 1915.

=== Central California Telephone Herald Co. (Sacramento) ===
Incorporated in California in February 1912 by C. J. Ward, F. W. Bresse and S. H. Whisner. Demonstrations were begun on April 1, 1912 from 4th Floor of the Elks' Building. In late 1913, provisions were made to lease a local theater, the Diepenbrock, to serve as a source for programming. However, there was an abrupt change of plans, and instead the owners decided to merge their operations with the Pacific Telephone Herald Company. The telephone newspaper service never became operational, either before or after the Pacific Telephone Herald merger. The company's charter was declared forfeited and repealed for non-payment of taxes in February 1915.

=== Massachusetts Telephone Herald Co. ===
This company was chartered in Delaware in August 1912 by R. R. Cooling, C. J. Jacobs and H. W. Davis of Wilmington, Delaware. There is no additional information, other than the fact that its corporation charter was repealed on January 24, 1916.

=== Pacific Telephone Herald Co. (Oakland, California) ===
The company was incorporated in California. Demonstrations were made at H. C. Capwell Company's Store beginning in February 1913 which lasted through at least April. The original corporate offices were at 303-304-305 Union Savings Bank Building in Oakland. A later incorporation, by C. F. Homer (president), Charles Smith (treasurer) and B. F. Hews (editor), at 1751 Franklin Street, was reported in the fall of 1913.

The company's secretary-treasurer, J. Whited died in September 1913, and the company president, William Angus, was killed in a mining accident in October 1914. In addition, the Pacific Telephone and Telegraph Company initially refused to lease telephone lines to the company, resulting in a complaint filed before the Railroad Commission of the State of California. This case was dismissed on November 5, 1913 after the two sides reached a settlement.

In November 1913, a major expansion was announced, with the purchase from the parent company of the rights to operate in twenty-one western U.S. states and "the greater part of southwestern Canada", and the next month saw a merger with the Central California Telephone Herald Company of Sacramento. But despite the ambitious expansion plans, it does not appear that any regular service was ever established, and the state business charter was forfeited on March 4, 1916 for failure to pay the state license tax.

=== Pennsylvania Telephone Herald Co. (Philadelphia) ===
Incorporated in the state of Delaware on December 30, 1911 by Frank Vernon, Ivor B. Blaiberg, and Albert D. Miller. (Also reported as E. B. Waples, W. W. Day and F. R. Janvier). Although there was a limited amount of corporate activity reported in 1912-1913, nothing of significance appears to have resulted. The corporation charter was repealed on January 25, 1917 for two years taxes unpaid.

=== San Diego Telephone Herald Co. ===
Incorporated in California in August 1911 by H. A. Schmidt (president), M. N. Schmidt and G. Stephens. The principals were inspired by the reported success of the concept in San Francisco, and promotional advertisements were run in the fall of 1911, but the enterprise never began operations, and the state charter was forfeited on November 30, 1912.

=== San Francisco Telephone Herald Co. ===
This was the second San Francisco-based Telephone Herald company, following the earlier California Telephone Herald Company. It was incorporated in the state of California on October 29, 1912, with founding directors of W. H. Dohrmann, J. F. Dohrmann, A. J. Beecher, F. W. Beecher, Thomas R. White, C. E. Youngblood, Rudolph Schlueten, Clarence Eppstein and E. L. Manner.

Demonstrations were given at 687 Market Street in early January 1913, but no further progress appears to have been made. The corporation charter was forfeited November 30, 1913, for failure to pay the state license tax.

=== Southern California Telephone Herald Co. (Los Angeles) ===
One of the first associate companies to be formed, this was also, due to fraud, one of the first to fail. It was chartered in California in May 1911, led by Peter Archbold Gordon Grimes, who turned out to be a con man. Grimes soon ran off with company funds, and was next seen impersonating an aviator in Hawaii. The corporation charter was forfeited on November 30, 1911 for failure to pay its state license tax.

=== Washington Telephone Herald Co. (Seattle) ===
This affiliate, capitalized with $500,000 of common stock, was chartered in the state of Washington in June, 1911. The officers were Sherwood Gillespy, president; B. J. Klarman, vice president; and N. R. Solner, secretary and treasurer. It was also announced that demonstrations were being conducted at the company headquarters at 339-340-341 Henry building. The company soon faced financial difficulties, and in October was forced into receivership due to a salary dispute. The company charter was cancelled sometime during the biennial reporting period of October 1, 1912 to September 30, 1914, for failure to pay the annual state license fee.

Sample promotional advertisements. None of these systems progressed beyond initial demonstrations.

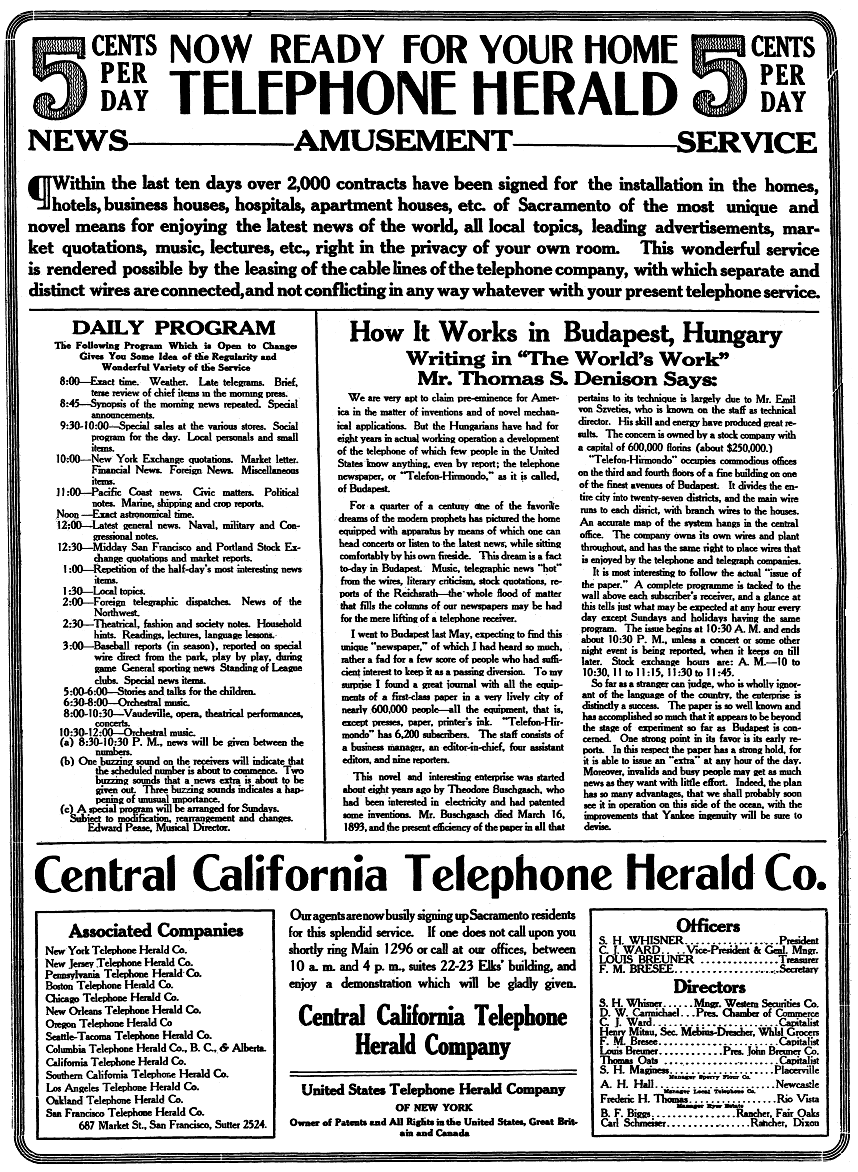
Central California Telephone Herald Co. (Sacramento, 1912)

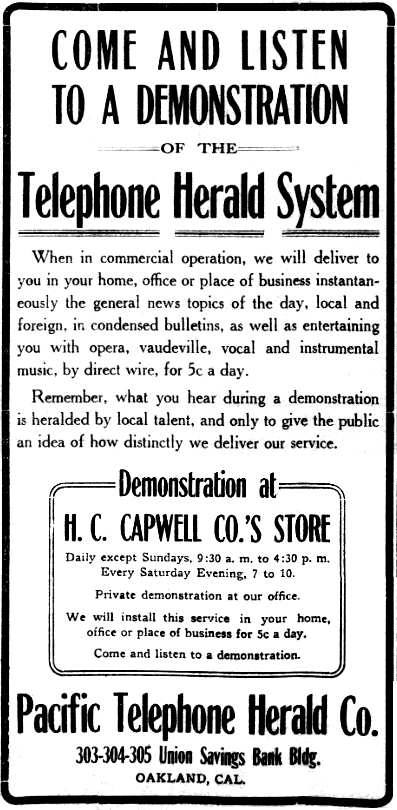
Pacific Telephone Herald Co. (Oakland, California, 1913)

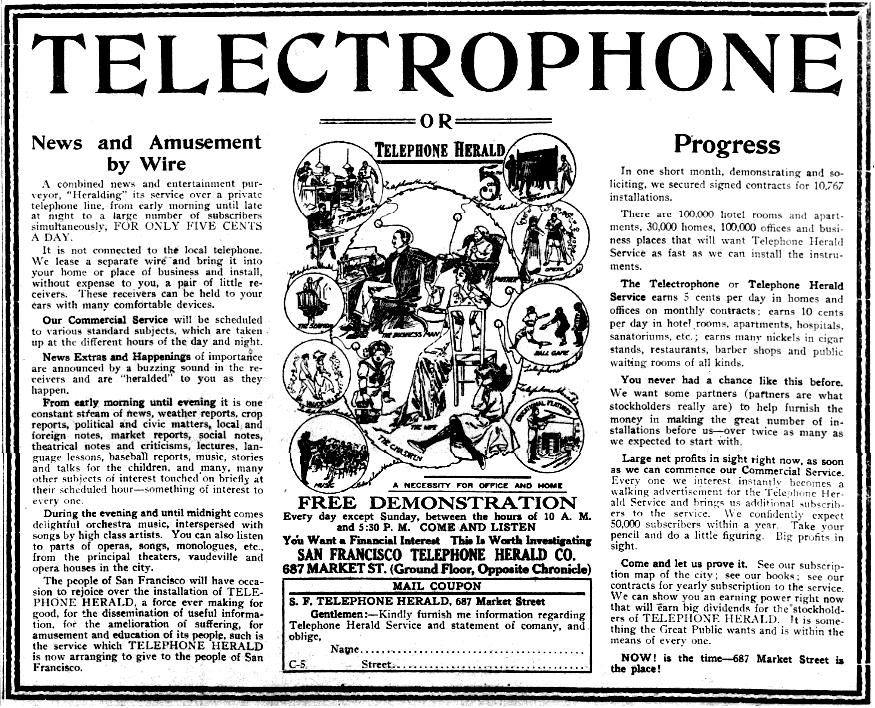
San Francisco Telephone Herald Co. (1913)

== Legacy ==
There were a few other early attempts to set up telephone-based news and entertainment systems in the United States, including the Tellevent, which conducted demonstrations and experimental work in Michigan from 1906-1908, and the Automatic Electric Company's Musolaphone, which operated a short-lived entertainment system in Chicago in 1913. However, these efforts were no more successful than the Telephone Herald companies.

Both the Hungarian Telefon Hírmondó and the Italian Araldo Telefonico survived long enough for their operations to be combined with radio broadcasting in the 1920s. The same did not occur in the United States, and the Telephone Herald companies were the last early effort to offer nationwide audio programming over telephone lines. Although the concept of home audio entertainment was attractive to potential U.S. subscribers, the lack of signal amplification and other technical limitations, such as the need to maintain a telephone line infrastructure, and having to listen over headphones, made the technology unprofitable.

Less than a decade after the failure of the Telephone Herald companies, radio broadcasting was developed, which had the significant advantage that it could dispense with the need to use telephone lines. Moreover, radio programming could be provided free of subscription fees, because selling airtime to advertisers, the financing method most commonly adopted in the United States, provided sufficient revenue for ongoing operations.
