= Radio advertisement =

Commercial business

In the United States, commercial radio stations generate most of their revenue by selling airtime for radio advertisements. These advertisements are paid for by a business or service in exchange for the station airing their commercial or mentioning them on air. The most common type of advertisement is the "spot commercial", which typically lasts no longer than one minute. Longer advertisements, often running for 45, 60, or more minutes, are known as "infomercials" and provide more detailed information about the promoted product or service.

The United States Federal Communications Commission (FCC), established under the Communications Act of 1934, regulates commercial broadcasting. Many of the relevant laws have remained relatively unchanged since the Radio Act of 1927. In 2015, radio accounted for 7.8% of total U.S. media expenditures.

== History ==
Commercial advertising by audio services predates the introduction of radio broadcasting, beginning with the 1893 establishment of the telephone-based Telefon Hírmondó in Budapest, Hungary. As of 1901, this early "telephone newspaper" sold 12-second advertising spots for one forint each, reaching subscribers who listened to its programming.

The first radio stations, introduced in the late 1800s, used crude spark transmitters capable only of sending the dots and dashes of Morse code. In the early 1900s, the first audio-capable transmitters were developed. Although these were initially used for point-to-point communication, there was also experimentation with broadcasting news and entertainment. Many of the earliest test transmissions functioned as advertisements for their owners and their new technologies. Stations soon began playing phonograph records in exchange for on-air mentions of the companies that supplied them. The earliest known instance occurred in July 1912, when Charles Herrold in San Jose, California, began weekly broadcasts from his technical school, including phonograph records provided by the Wiley B. Allen company.

Further developments took place in late 1916 when the De Forest Radio Telephone & Telegraph Company began operating experimental station 2XG in New York City. Lee de Forest arranged with the Columbia Gramophone Company to broadcast phonograph records from their offices; in exchange, he announced the record titles and the name "Columbia Gramophone Company" with each selection. The debut program aired on October 26, 1916, with nightly broadcasts following beginning November 1. De Forest initially used the broadcasts to promote "the products of the De Forest Radio Co.," but later discontinued the sales messages after comments from Western Electric engineers. A commentator in QST magazine observed that 2XG demonstrated the practicality of "conducting regular advertising and news talks by radio," which he described as "decidedly something to think about."

Radio broadcasting was suspended in April 1917 after the United States entered World War I, when a government ban silenced civilian radio stations for the duration of the conflict. After the ban was lifted in October 1919, promotional record broadcasts resumed. Westinghouse engineer Frank Conrad at experimental station 8XK in Wilkinsburg, Pennsylvania, aired records supplied by the Brunswick Shop in exchange for on-air acknowledgements. A more formal example occurred in late October 1920, when the Randolph Wurlitzer Company sponsored a broadcast over station 9XB of Cincinnati, featuring Victor records scheduled for release in November. However, as radio broadcasting expanded rapidly in 1922, the record industry came to believe that radio broadcasts discouraged rather than promoted sales, leading to the end of these promotional arrangements.

Many early radio stations were operated by radio equipment manufacturers such as Westinghouse Electric & Manufacturing Company and General Electric, or by radio receiver retailers, including department stores such as Gimbels, Bamberger's, and Wanamaker's. These companies used broadcasting to promote receiver sales, which in turn financed station operations. As more stations began broadcasting, owners faced increasing financial pressure because running a station involved significant costs, especially once performer payments and music royalty obligations became standard.

In February 1922, the American Telephone & Telegraph Company (AT&T) announced that it would establish stations dedicated to selling airtime to interested parties, a practice AT&T termed "toll broadcasting." Its flagship station, WEAF in New York (now WFAN), aired what is widely considered the first paid radio commercial on August 28, 1922, for the Queensboro Corporation, promoting a new apartment development in Jackson Heights, Queens near the recently completed #7 subway line. Based on cross-licensing agreements, AT&T initially asserted that its patent rights gave it a monopoly on commercial radio broadcasting. Although the courts upheld this interpretation, the practice was widely unpopular, and AT&T eventually created a licensing system that allowed individual stations to sell airtime.

Other stations may have quietly sold airtime before WEAF. Frank V. Bremer reportedly leased his Jersey City, New Jersey amateur station, 2IA, to the Jersey Review in May 1920 for $35 for twice-weekly broadcasts, and again on January 1, 1922, to the Jersey Journal for $50 for a New Year's Day broadcast. On April 4, 1922, Alvan T. Fuller reportedly purchased airtime on WGI of Medford Hillside, Massachusetts, to promote his Packard automobile dealership.

The introduction of radio advertising was initially highly controversial. United States Secretary of Commerce Herbert Hoover said that radio should not be "drowned in advertising chatter". An article in the November 1922 issue of Radio Broadcast complained that "driblets of advertising... are floating through the ether every day" and warned that "the woods are full of opportunists who are restrained by no scruples when the scent of profit comes down the wind." Advertising was effective, however; a real estate developer who paid $50 for 10 minutes on WEAF said that sales increased by $127,000. Although a few stations resisted carrying commercial messages into the mid-1920s, no viable alternative funding model emerged, and by the late 1920s most U.S. radio stations aired commercially sponsored programming.

During the Golden Age of Radio, advertisers commonly sponsored entire programs, with acknowledgements such as "We thank our sponsors for making this program possible" appearing at the beginning or end of broadcasts. As the medium developed, major stations experimented with new formats, and advertising became an increasingly important source of revenue. E. H. Sanders, advertising director at Shell Oil Co., urged broadcasters to work directly with relevant advertisers and sell tie-in commercial spots for established programs. Sanders argued that both advertisers and broadcasters would benefit from such arrangements. Philco informed dealers that during the Philco Hour, broadcast nationwide on Friday nights, the company's name would be mentioned at least a dozen times per episode. The "visual" dimension of programming was left to the listener's imagination. Comedian and voice actor Stan Freberg demonstrated this on his radio show in 1957, using sound effects to depict the Royal Canadian Air Force towing a 10-ton maraschino cherry and dropping it onto a 700-ft. mountain of whipped cream floating in a lake of hot chocolate, cheered on by 25,000 extras. The scene was later adopted by the U.S. Radio Advertising Bureau to promote radio advertising.

The radio industry has undergone significant changes over time. Although new media and technologies now compete for consumer attention, radio remains widely used, with 95% of people in the United States listening weekly. Internet radio listening has also expanded rapidly, rising from 12% in 2002 to over 50% in 2015. Despite an increase in choices for consumers, a 2009 study found that 92% of listeners remained tuned in during commercial breaks.

== Formats ==
Radio advertising is available in a broad range of types and lengths. As the radio industry has evolved and production technologies have improved, the methods used to present commercial content have diversified. The two primary types of radio advertisements are "live reads" and produced spots.

A live read, similar to an ad-libbed commercial, refers to an advertisement read on air by a DJ. The delivery may be based on a script, fact sheet, or the DJ's personal knowledge. Live reads may also take the form of an endorsement, in which the DJ promotes the advertiser's product or service. The Radio Advertising Bureau (RAB) defines an endorsement as one in which a station or on-air personality "endorses" the advertiser's product or service, typically delivered live.

Produced spots are more common. A spot is considered "produced" when it is recorded for the client by a radio station or an advertising agency. Produced commercial formats include straight reads with sound effects or background music, dialogue, monologue (in which the voice talent portrays a character rather than serving as an announcer), jingles, or combinations of these approaches. Research indicates that the overall quality of commercials is generally as important to listeners as the number of advertisements they hear.

== Research and rates ==
Radio stations generally air advertising in clusters or sets distributed throughout the broadcast hour. Studies indicate that the first or second commercial in a break has higher listener recall than those aired later in the set.

Nielsen Audio is one of the main providers of ratings data in the United States. Most radio stations and advertising agencies subscribe to this service, as ratings play a central role in the broadcast industry. Advertising agencies typically purchase airtime based on a target demographic. For example, a client may seek to reach men aged 18 to 49. Ratings data enables advertisers to identify specific segments of the listening audience and to buy airtime accordingly. Within the industry, ratings are often referred to as "numbers".

Ratings data can indicate who is listening to a particular station, the most popular times of day for specific groups, and the percentage of the total listening audience that may be reached with a given advertising schedule. It can also show how many people are listening at each hour. This information allows advertisers to identify strong stations within a market and determine the most efficient times of day to run their advertisements.

In addition to basic ratings, many radio stations have access to other audience data, such as Scarborough Research, which provides further detail about listener activities, ethnicity, types of employment, income levels, consumer habits, and attendance at entertainment venues.

Radio stations sell airtime according to established dayparts. A typical daypart schedule may include 6 a.m.–10 a.m., 10 a.m.–3 p.m., 3 p.m.–7 p.m., and 7 p.m.–midnight. Spots airing from midnight to 6 a.m. are referred to as "overnights". Although daypart schedules vary by station, most follow broadly similar structures. Morning and evening drive times, when audiences are commuting, are typically the most popular and therefore command the highest rates.

Rates may also vary depending on the time of year. January is often a slow period for advertising, and many stations offer discounted rates. Conversely, in warm-weather markets such as Florida, rates may increase during the winter due to seasonal population growth from "snow birds". Rates also depend on market demand and negotiation between the advertiser and the station. During peak periods, some stations may sell out of available advertising inventory, as radio has a finite number of commercial units per hour. During the dot-com boom, some stations reportedly aired up to 20 minutes of commercials per hour. Although commercial loads are lower today—averaging approximately nine minutes per hour—inventory can still sell out during busy seasons.

Advertising rates also vary by spot length. While 60-second spots remain the most common, stations also sell 30-, 15-, ten-, and two-second units. 30-second advertisements have long been used in television but were adopted by radio more recently. Clear Channel introduced the "Less is More" initiative in 2004, promoting 30-second commercials in various U.S. markets. While fewer commercials can increase recall rates, research suggests that 60-second spots may continue to yield stronger brand and message recall.

Stations also air ten-second spots, known as "billboards". These typically accompany station features, such as traffic reports, and are limited to roughly 30 words. 15-second spots are commonly used for promotional announcements, though some stations also sell them.

In addition to traditional broadcasts, some stations sell advertising during streaming audio broadcasts. Historically, streaming feeds included only on-air commercials, but CBS announced that it would introduce separately sold and voiced "live reads" for streaming broadcasts, citing the effectiveness of live endorsements.

== Efficacy ==
More than eight out of ten Americans consider listening to commercials in exchange for free radio to be a "fair deal." Broadcast radio advertising also offers the advantage of being localized and relatively inexpensive compared with other media, such as television. As a result, radio advertising can serve as an effective, lower-cost medium through which businesses can reach their target consumers.

Research indicates that radio advertisements can evoke emotional responses in listeners. In turn, listeners may perceive the ads as personally relevant, which can increase market awareness and potentially improve sales for advertisers. Approximately 25 percent of listeners report greater interest in a product or business after hearing about it on their preferred station.

Local DJs often establish personal rapport with their audiences, which can contribute to listener trust and engagement with promotional messages. Live endorsements have grown in popularity as advertisers seek new ways to reach consumers and differentiate their messages. Studies show that live reads have higher recall and response rates than typical recorded spots. Around 26 percent of listeners report increased interest in a product or business when it is endorsed by a DJ.

As more advertisers turn to live endorsements, demand for DJ-read commercials continues to grow. However, with fewer DJs available at many stations, those who remain often receive a high volume of endorsement requests.

== Regulatory considerations ==
The Communications Act of 1934 established the Federal Communications Commission (FCC), which regulates broadcasting in the United States. In response to the payola scandal of the 1950s, the FCC introduced "sponsorship disclosure" rules. These rules apply to both pay-for-play practices and standard advertisements, based on the principle that consumers have the right to know "by whom they are being persuaded."

Section 317 of the Communications Act, concerning the "Announcement of Payment For Broadcast," is particularly relevant to advertisers. In general terms, the provision requires stations to disclose when money, services, or anything of value is provided—directly or indirectly—in exchange for on-air mentions. For example, if a cell phone provider gives a free phone to a station's DJ and the DJ subsequently praises the company's service on air, the station must disclose that the mention constitutes an advertisement.

In most cases, listeners can distinguish between commercial content and entertainment. The Act includes an "obviousness" exception, meaning that when it is clear that a message is a commercial, the disclosure requirement does not apply. However, whenever anything of value changes hands in exchange for on-air mentions, disclosure is required.

The Federal Trade Commission (FTC) also plays a role in regulating the broadcast industry, particularly concerning false or misleading advertising. In October 2009, the FTC issued updated guidelines on endorsements, requiring clear disclosure of any relationship between an advertiser and an endorser. Under these guidelines, endorsers must reveal any "material connections" they have with a seller or business.

In recent years, there has been increased concern about the blurring of entertainment or editorial content with advertising. Marketers increasingly embed products into media so that consumers may not realize they are being marketed to. On radio, this can make it difficult to distinguish between casual DJ commentary and commercial messages.

== See also ==
- Jingle
- Promo (media)
