= Telephone Herald =

Telephone Herald may refer to:

- The Telefon Hírmondó telephone newspaper service in Budapest, Hungary
- The United States Telephone Herald Company
