= Araldo Telefonico =

Telephone newspaper systems in Italy

Araldo Telefonico ("Telephone Herald" in English) was the name used for a group of telephone newspaper systems located in Italy, which provided news and entertainment programming over telephone lines to subscribing homes and businesses. Beginning with the capital city of Rome in 1910, this was the most widely implemented of the various telephone newspaper operations, however, in the early 1920s, the systems were merged with, and eventually superseded by, the development of radio broadcasting.

== History ==
The Araldo Telefonico employed technology licensed from the operators of the Telefon Hírmondó, which had debuted as a telephone newspaper in Budapest, Hungary in 1893. Beginning in 1906, Luigi Ranieri, an Italian engineer who represented the Construction Mécaniques Escher Wyss and Company of Zurich, Switzerland, applied for permission to install systems in Rome, Milan, and Naples. In August 1909 the Italian government authorized operations in Rome, which began service the next year, with a schedule similar to that of the Telefon Hírmondó's. There was some skepticism about the practicality of the idea among the local newspapers, with one declaring: "the Romans love the quiet life and don't want to be disturbed by things that have nothing to do with them".

The Rome facility featured an extensive range of programs, running from 8:00 a.m. to late at night. Programming consisted of news, including stock exchange reports and information about the Italian Parliament, religious services, time signals, and language courses. Also featured were musical concerts, both from a local studio and via contracted prominent theaters and other establishments. The number of subscribers was 100 in September 1910, growing to 1,100 two years later, and reaching a peak of 1,315 in December 1914. A subscribers directory from 1912 listed numerous prominent individuals, including Italy's Queen Elena, plus a listening station located at the Camera dei Deputati legislative building.

Under the provisions of the authorization issued by the Italian Postal Ministry, the Rome facility was required to pay ongoing fees, but was unable to meet this requirement during the first three years of service, even after a reduction in the fee schedule. Because of this, in February 1914 the Postal Ministry issued an ordinance attempting to revoke its operating license, followed by two orders in 1915 to cease operations, but Luigi Ranieri refused to comply, and continued to operate in defiance of the government instructions. Finally, a 1917 decision by the Tribunale di Roma (Rome city court) ruled in Ranieri's favor, on the grounds that the fees were only applicable to telephone systems providing two-way communication, while the Araldo Telefonico's programming constituted "neither a communication medium nor a telephone" in the generally understood sense. Despite this legal victory, the Rome operation was suspended in 1916 due to World War I. Following the war, the Rome system was relaunched in 1922, with Luigi Ranieri now working with his son, Augusto. Additional systems were built in the city of Milan, plus, in late 1921, Bologna.

Beginning in 1923, Luigi Ranieri began operating a radio broadcasting station, known as Radio Araldo. Initially the Rome Araldo Telefonico maintained a programming advantage over radio stations, because it held the exclusive right to performances made from the best known theaters. In 1924, Radio Araldo was combined with others to form the broadcasting company Unione Radiofonica Italiana (URI); in 1928 the URI became Ente Italiano per le Audizioni Radiofoniche (EIAR), and finally, in 1944, Radio Audizioni Italiane (RAI). Maria Luisa Boncompagni, who, beginning in 1914, had been the announcer in charge of reading the morning news reports provided by the Agenzia Stefani press agency for the Araldo Telefonico, became a prominent URI radio announcer.

In their last years the systems no longer originated their own programming, instead merely serving as relays, sending local radio programs by telephone line to homes that wanted to avoid having to purchase and maintain radio receivers. The Bologna system was the last to remain operational, surviving until 1943, although by then the number of subscribers had dwindled to just 100.
