= Musolaphone =

Audio Distribution System

The Musolaphone (also marketed as the Multa Musola), developed by the Automatic Electric Company of Chicago, Illinois, was an audio distribution system that transmitted news and entertainment over telephone lines to subscribing homes and businesses. The company's "Automatic Enunciator" loudspeakers were employed at the receiving end.

A test commercial installation was established in southside Chicago in 1913, but the project was short-lived and did not prove to be financially successful. This was the last significant attempt to set up a "telephone newspaper" to transmit entertainment over telephone lines in the United States, prior to the development of radio broadcasting in the early 1920s.

== History ==
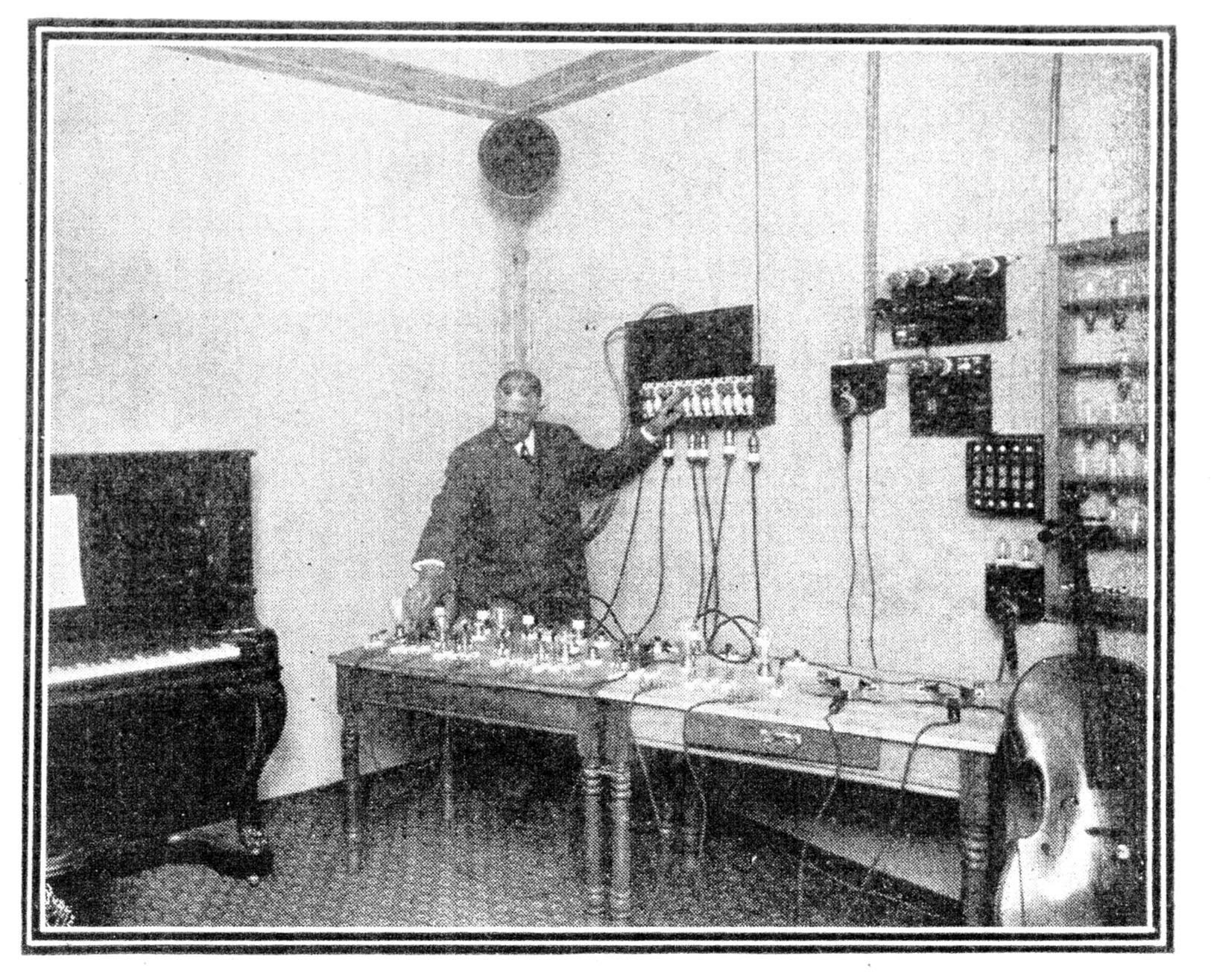
John J. Comer, inventor, demonstrating the Chicago Musolaphone transmission equipment.

In 1910, the Automatic Electric Company, an established firm best known for making automatic telephone switchboards, announced its development of a new loudspeaker, called the "Automatic Enunciator", which was envisioned to have multiple potential uses. In part, Joseph Harris, president of the company, predicted: "An automatic enunciator, by which a man talking in New York can be heard in every part of a large room in Chicago... may make it possible for a public speaker to address a million or more people at one time... Running descriptions of baseball games, or prize fights can be sent over long distances for the entertainment of sporting fans of all varieties."

In 1910 the Automatic Enunciator Company was formed in Chicago to market the invention. Initially, Automatic Enunciators were employed in public address systems, for making announcements in establishments such as department stores, factories, and railroad stations. In 1913, multiple units were installed throughout the Comiskey Park baseball field in Chicago, both for announcements and to provide musical interludes.

The next step was to expand the system to distribute programming to multiple sites, initially under the name "Multa Musola". Company publicity included the following description: "The object of the Multa Musola service is to distribute music by telephone wires from an instrument at the central office, so it can be easily heard in any part of a room without having to listen carefully."

The summer of 1912 saw a series of Multa Musola demonstrations in Portland, Oregon, and in the spring of the next year, advertisements for the Oregon Enunciator Company appeared, promoting both home and business service. This would have competed with another telephone-based news and entertainment service, the Oregon Telephone Herald Company's "telephone newspaper", but there is no evidence that the Multa Musola system ever began operation. Moreover, later that year, Oregon's Corporation Commissioner, R. A. Watson, acting under the state's "Blue Sky" law, prohibited both the Oregon Enunciator Company and the Oregon Telephone Herald Company from doing business in the state, due to concern about their financial viability.

However, an experimental commercial Musolaphone service was established in south-side Chicago in 1913, working in conjunction with the Illinois Telephone & Telegraph Co. Two features that were superior to the Telephone Herald "telephone newspaper" systems was that listening was done over loudspeakers instead of headphones, and the system did not need dedicated, separate telephone lines, because "as soon as connection is made in the telephone exchange to the subscriber's line upon which the service is being given, the other equipment is automatically disconnected. When the subscriber desires to use the telephone, disconnection from the Musolaphone service, as it is called, is obtained by the operation of a push button installed at the telephone instrument". John J. Comer, former General Manager of a similarly designed Tel-musici installation at Wilmington, Delaware, was described as the inventor.

An early 1914 report reviewed the Chicago Musolaphone's daily schedule:

"From eight to twelve in the morning, announcement of special bargain sales at the leading stores is made, and the principal news items are read from the morning papers including the United States weather report, stock market quotations, announcements of special events happening during the day, etc. At twelve o'clock the announcement of standard Western Union time is made. From twelve to one-thirty is given up to a musical program, especially adapted to cafes, restaurants, dining rooms, etc., and following this is a running description of ball games of the home team and scores by innings of other teams in both leagues during the baseball season. In winter lectures by prominent people will be obtainable besides language lessons in French, German, Italian, etc., and a period will be set aside for the reading of children's stories. A half hour's music for dancing will be offered each evening."

Subscribers were charged $3 a week for the service. (For comparison, at this time issues of the Chicago Tribune newspaper cost one cent on weekdays and five cents on Sundays.) Eventually interactive communication was established, as one report stated: "There is in Chicago a teacher of languages whose pupils have grown so in number recently that personal attention to each pupil has come to be out of the question. An arrangement was made with the Automatic Company's studio for connections and service and now the lessons are all transmitted by telephones, service can be cut in any time for the purpose of asking questions or more information on certain points and in all ways the telephone service proves as flexible as the ordinary arrangement in a studyroom."

A challenge was submitted to the Chicago Counsel about the legality of the Musolaphone's operation on Sundays, and the fact that the telephone company was partnering with a service that charged extra beyond the normal telephone rental fees, but a ruling did not sustain either of these objections. An additional complaint was made to the City of Chicago by "a prominent news bureau... which protested that the music interfered with the news service". Again the city ruled in favor of the Musolaphone operation, while further noting that "The company, however, discontinued the music service."

Chicago Musolaphone (1913)

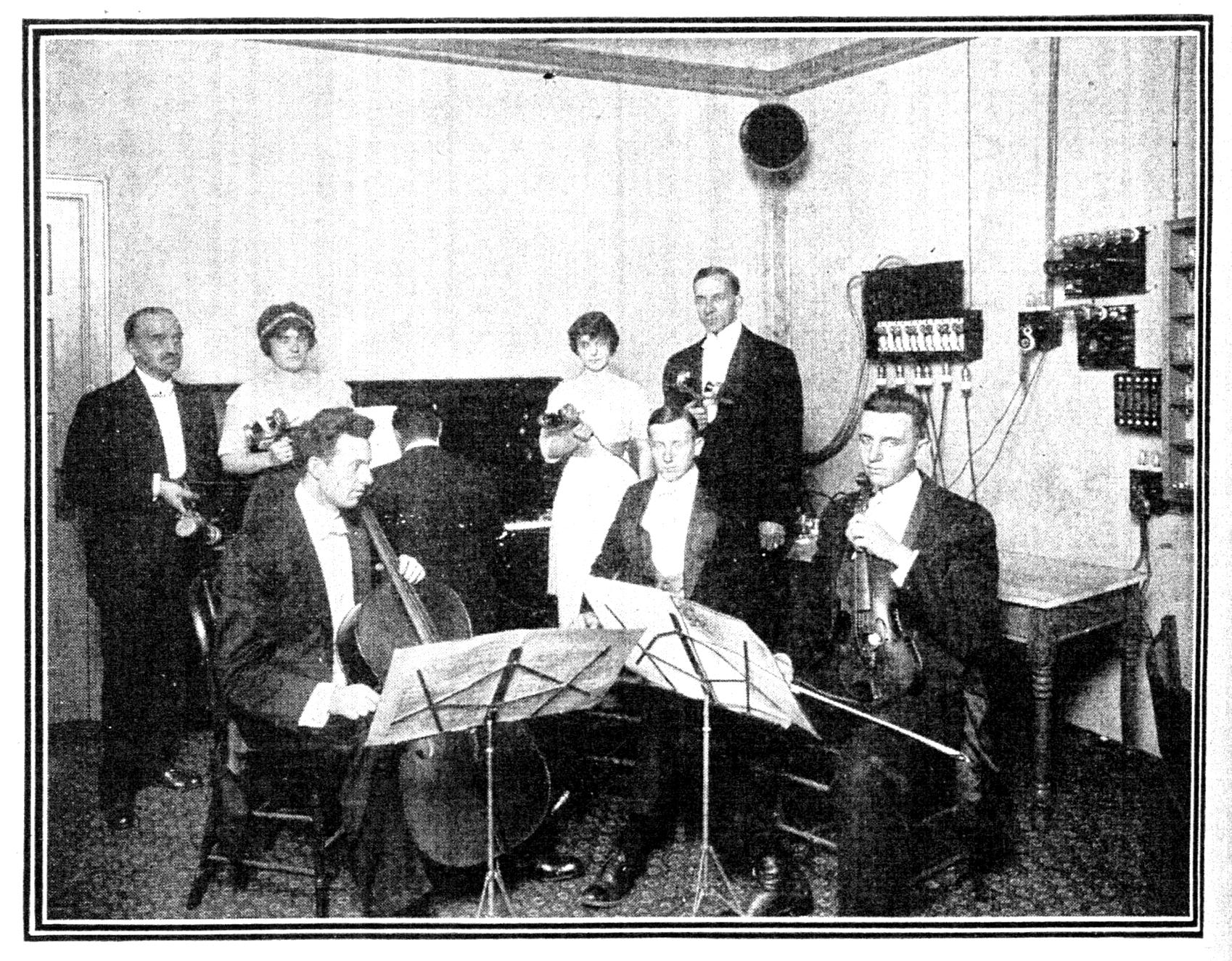
Studio for vocal and instrumental programs.

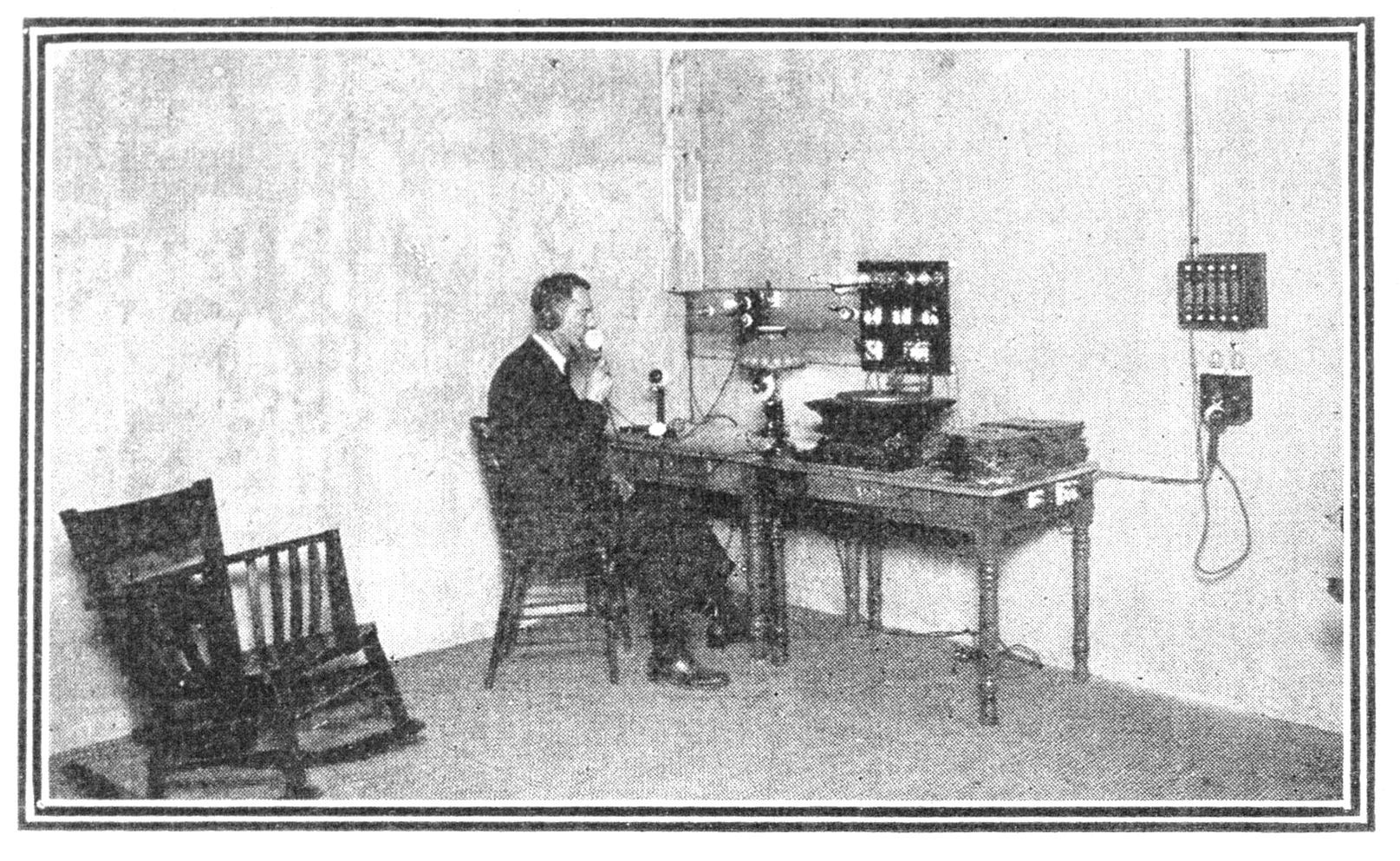
Studio for spoken word and phonograph record transmissions.

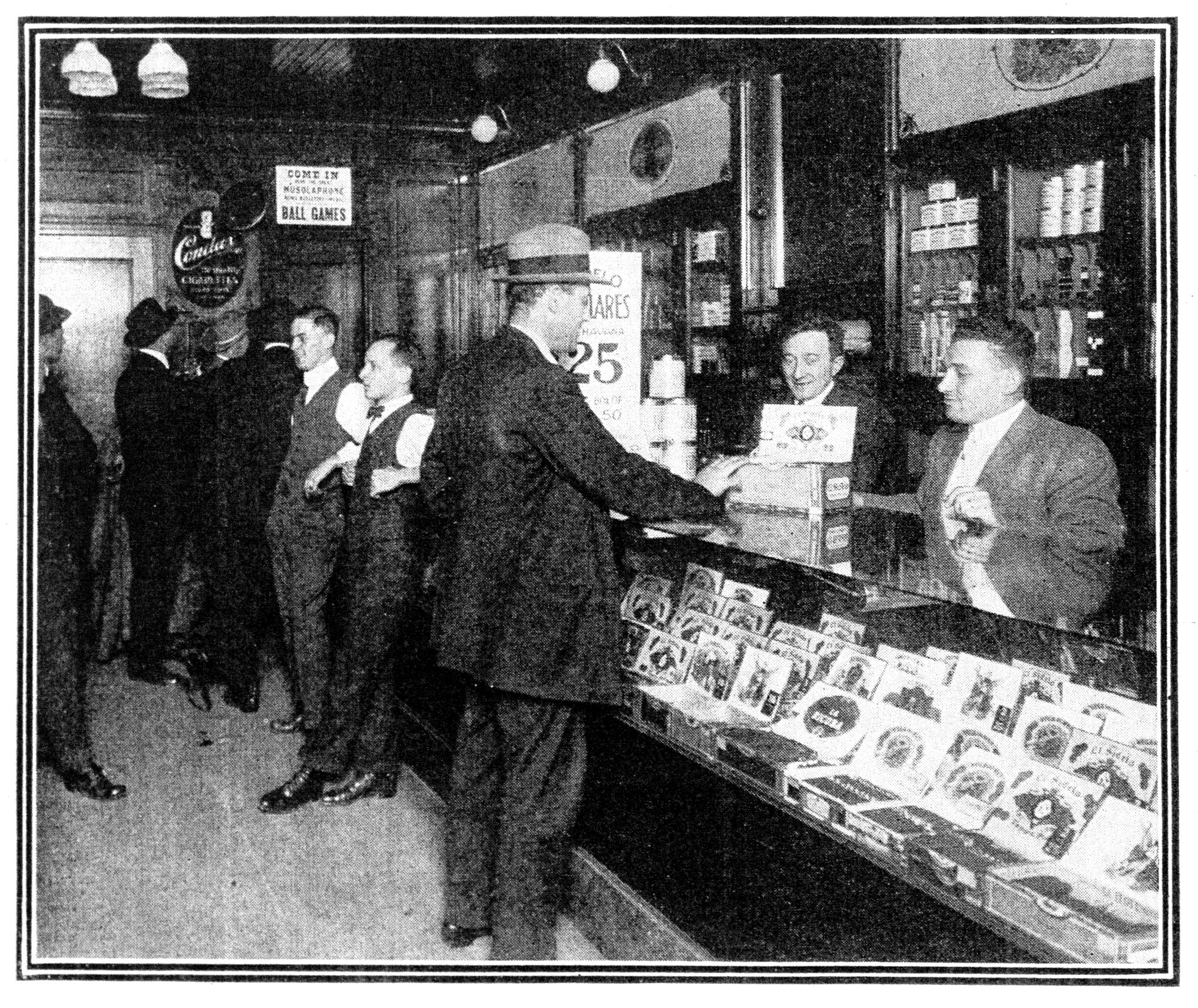
Listening to baseball scores in a cigar shop.

In early 1914, it was announced that the Federal Telephone Company of Buffalo, New York was planning to establish its Musolaphone service, but it appears that no other systems were ever established. However, Automatic Enunciator loudspeakers continued to be marketed, with the emphasis returning to their use in public address systems. The Musolaphone Corporation's Delaware charter was repealed on January 27, 1919 for failure to pay taxes for two years, and the Automatic Enunciator Company was dissolved in 1926.
