= Unione radiofonica italiana =

- Italy
- Broadcast area: Kingdom of Italy

Programming
- Language: Italian
- Format: News, Classical music

Ownership
- Owner: Radiofono; SIRAC; Italian government

History
- First air date: 6 October 1924
- Last air date: 17 November 1927 (de jure); 1928 (de facto)

Unione radiofonica italiana or URI (the "Italian Radiophonic Union"), was an Italian radio broadcaster founded in Turin on 27 August 1924. It was the exclusive radio broadcaster of the Kingdom of Italy.

== History ==
=== Establishment ===
On 8 February 1923, the Royal decree n. 1067 gave the State the exclusive rights for the radio broadcasts to be exercised through a concessionaire company. In consequence, three companies were founded in order to achieve the licence, all of them were related to American and British manufacturers of radio devices:

- The "Società italiana radio audizioni circolari" (SIRAC), founded by Riccardo Gualino and representative of RCA for Italy
- The "Società Anonima Radiofono - Società italiana per le radiocomunicazioni circolari" (Radiofono), founded in September 1923 by Guglielmo Marconi through the British Marconi Company
- The third competitor was engineer Luigi Ranieri, publisher of L'Araldo Telefonico and, accordingly to a provisional licence, the experimental Radio Araldo, formed after an agreement with Western Electric.

Negotiations lasted more than a year, but the Minister of Post Giovanni Antonio Colonna di Cesarò seemed to want to give the licence to Ranieri.

However, at the beginning of 1924, Di Cesarò resigned from the government and he was replaced by Costanzo Ciano, who preferred Marconi.

Ranieri succeeded to achieve a technical test. On 20 March 1924, Radiofono installed a test station in the Centocelle district of Rome, but it failed to broadcast a speech of Benito Mussolini in the Costanzi theater on the next 23 March probably due to electric interferences.

On 3 June 1924, Minister of Communications Costanzo Ciano addressed a letter to the companies who requested the licence, inviting them to find an agreement.

A compromise was reached with the formation of a united company, without however the joining of Radio Araldo which did not have enough capital in order to take part in it. On 27 August 1924, the URI was founded by Radiofono and SIRAC through the subscription of a share capital of 1,400,000 lire (82.9% of Radiofono e 17.1% of SIRAC). Enrico Marches from FIAT was appointed as president, while Luigi Solari, close to Guglielmo Marconi, as deputy president.

=== Broadcasts ===
On 6 October 1924, at 9 pm, the first URI station of San Filippo in Rome, produced by Marconi, broadcast the first regular announcement read by Maria Luisa Boncompagni:

Italian Radiophonic Union. 1-RO, Rome station. Inaugural symphonic concert.

— Maria Luisa Boncompagni

Shortly after, Ines Viviani Donarelli, from the Roman station of Corrodi Palace, presented the first programme:

URI (Unione Radiofonica Italiana). 1-RO: station of Rome. Radio wavelength 425 meters. Our greeting and good evening to all the listeners. It is 9 pm of 6 October 1924. We broadcast the inaugural concert of the first Italian radiophonic station, for the circular radio hearings service. The quartet formed by Ines Viviani Donarelli, who is speaking, Alberto Magalotti, Amedeo Fortunati and Alessandro Cicognani, will perform Haydn from the Opus 7 string quartet, I and II half.

— Ines Viviani Donarelli

The programme, which lasted one hour and a half, broadcast opera, chamber and classical music along with a weather report and news about the stock exchange.

On 27 November 1924, the government gave URI private company the exclusive licences of radio broadcasting for six years (extendable to other four), accordingly to an agreement signed on 27 November 1924 and the Royal Decree n. 2191 of 14 October 1924.

With that decree, URI was considered the only Italian radio broadcaster to be authorized to spread news of public interest and the government was the only one to approve the news broadcasting from press agencies different from Agenzia Stefani, the official source as well as the first Italian press agency founded in 1853 by Camillo Benso, Count of Cavour.

The URI announcer was Maria Luisa Boncompagni from L'Araldo Telefonico and Radio Araldo.

On 18 January 1925, URI published the first issue of Radiorario, a weekly magazine which provided the broadcast schedules and publicized the new media to the public.

The radio station of Rome was followed by the one of Milan (8 December 1925) and Naples (14 November 1926).

In October 1926, adverts began to be broadcast and the advertising space was provided by Sipra.

The radio broadcasting phenomena, initially hindered by prohibitive costs for a very poor Italy, took off in the thirties due to the initiatives promoted by the Fascist regime which gave to each casa del Fascio a radio device and promoted the spread of economical devices like Radiorurale and radio Balilla.

According to the Royal Law Decree n. 2207 of 17 November 1927, URI became the Ente Italiano per le Audizioni Radiofoniche (EIAR) in January 1928.

== See also ==
- Ente Italiano per le Audizioni Radiofoniche
- RAI
- Rai Radio 1

== Bibliography ==
- Balbi, Gabriele (2010). La radio prima della radio. Rome: Bulzoni.
