= Tivadar Puskás =

Hungarian inventor (1844–1893)

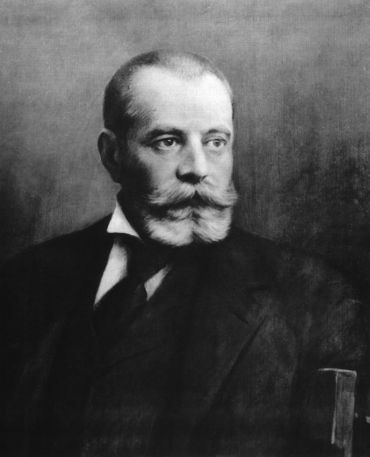
- Born: Tivadar Puskás de Ditró; 17 September 1844; Pest, Kingdom of Hungary, Austrian Empire
- Died: 16 March 1893 (aged 48); Budapest, Austria-Hungary
- Other name: Theodore Puskás
- Occupation: Inventor

Tivadar Puskás de Ditró (in older English technical literature: Theodore Puskás) (17 September 1844 – 16 March 1893) was a Hungarian inventor, telephone pioneer, and inventor of the telephone exchange. He was also the founder of Telefon Hírmondó.

== Biography ==
The Puskás family from Ditró (today Harghita County of Romania), was part of the Transylvanian Hungarian nobility. Puskás studied law and later engineering sciences. After living in England and working for the Warnin Railway Construction Company he returned to Hungary. In 1873, on the occasion of the World Exhibition in Vienna, he founded the Puskás Travel Agency, the fourth-oldest in the world and the first travel agency in Central Europe. After this, Puskás moved to Colorado and became a gold miner. It was while he was in America that Puskás exposed the American "energy machine" inventor Keely as a fraud.

Puskás was working on his idea for a telegraph exchange when Alexander Graham Bell invented the telephone. This led him to take a fresh look at his work and he decided to get in touch with the American inventor Thomas Edison.

Puskás now began to concentrate on perfecting his scheme to build a telephone exchange. According to Edison, "Tivadar Puskas was the first person to suggest the idea of a telephone exchange". The first experimental telephone exchange was based on the ideas of Puskás, and it was built by the Bell Telephone Company in Boston in 1877.

On March 11, 1878, Puskas demonstrated the first working Edison phonograph from the US (using tinfoil) to the French Academy of Sciences. It was generally successful although he was also accused of "ventriloquism." He was responsible for having it manufactured (in limited quantities) by E. Hardy of Paris.

In 1879, Puskás set up a telephone exchange in Paris, where he looked after Thomas Edison's European affairs for the next four years. In Paris he was greatly helped by his younger brother Ferenc Puskás (1848–1884), who later established the first telephone exchange in Pest.

In 1887, he introduced the multiplex switchboard, which was a revolutionary step in the further development of telephone exchanges.

His next invention was the "Telephone News Service" that he introduced in Pest, which announced news and "broadcast" programmes and was in many ways the forerunner of the radio. According to a contemporary scientific journal, at most 50 people could listen to Edison's telephone at the same time, if one more person was connected, none of the subscribers could hear anything. With Puskás's apparatus, by contrast, half a million people could clearly hear the programme coming from the exchange.

In 1890, Puskás was granted a patent for a procedure for carrying out controlled explosions, which was the forerunner of modern techniques. He experimented with this technology when he was working on regulating the Lower Danube.

Puskás registered the patent of technology behind the telephone newspaper Telefon Hírmondó in 1892, in the Patent Office of the Austro-Hungarian Empire, with the title "A new method of organizing and fitting a telephone newspaper". The Telefon Hírmondó service started on 15 February 1893, with around 60 subscribers. After Puskás's death on 16 March 1893, his brother Albert Puskás sold the enterprise and the patent rights to István Popper.

Tivadar Puskás did not win extensive public recognition during his lifetime. However, in 2008, the Hungarian National Bank issued a 1000 Forint commemorative coin in honor of Puskás and the 115th anniversary of the introduction of the Telefon Hírmondó.

Hungarian 2008 Tivadar Puskás commemorative coin (1000 Forints)

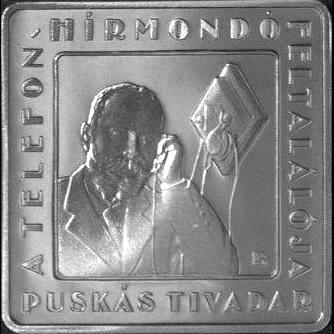
Obverse

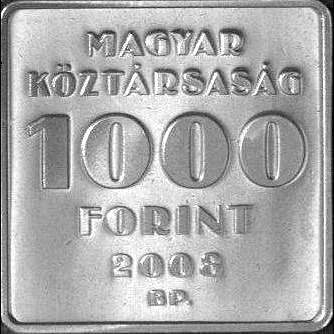
Reverse
