= Telefon Hírmondó =

Telephone newspaper in Budapest, Hungary

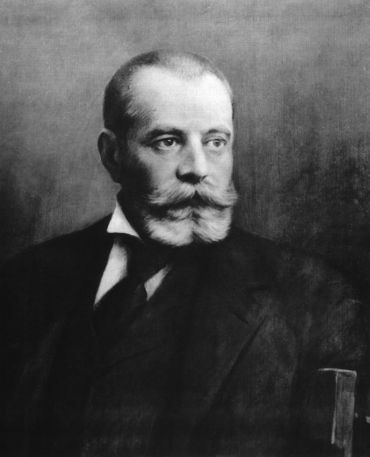
- Tivadar Puskás, Telefon Hírmondó founder
- Type: Daily newspaper
- Format: Telephone newspaper
- Owner: Telefonhírmondó Joint stock company
- Staff writers: Approximately 200 (Winter, 1907)
- Founded: 15 February 1893
- Ceased publication: Original programming until 1 December 1925, relayed radio station programming until 1944
- Headquarters: Budapest
- Country: Hungary
- Circulation: 15,000 (1907)

The Telefon Hírmondó (also Telefonhírmondó, generally translated as "Telephone Herald") was a "telephone newspaper" located in Budapest, Hungary, which, beginning in 1893, provided news and entertainment to subscribers over telephone lines. It was both the first and the longest surviving telephone newspaper system, although from 1 December 1925 until its termination in 1944 it was primarily used to retransmit programmes broadcast by Magyar Rádió.

Three decades before the development of radio broadcasting, the Telefon Hírmondó was the first service to electronically deliver a wide range of spoken and musical programming to a diverse audience. Although its inventor envisioned that the technology could be eventually expanded to serve a national or international audience, the technical limitations of the time ultimately limited its service area to just the city of Budapest.

== Establishment ==
The Telefon Hírmondó was founded by Tivadar Puskás (a few reviews translated his name as "Theodore Buschgasch"), an engineer and inventor who had worked with Thomas Edison. In view of the ever-increasing pace of living, especially in major cities, Puskás recognized that daily newspapers, even with multiple editions, could no longer effectively keep up with developing events. He decided that this problem could be rectified through the introduction of a regularly updated audio news source.

Initially, the Telefon Hírmondó editorial office was located near Astoria, at 6 Magyar Street. The system began operating on 15 February 1893 with around 60 subscribers, and was inaugurated with a message from Puskás, which, translated into English, stated:

We greet the inhabitants of Budapest. We greet them in an unusual way from which telephone broadcasting all over the world will start its victorious journey.

For the initial transmissions, individuals who had telephones called into a central office to listen to Telefon Hírmondó reports that were updated hourly.

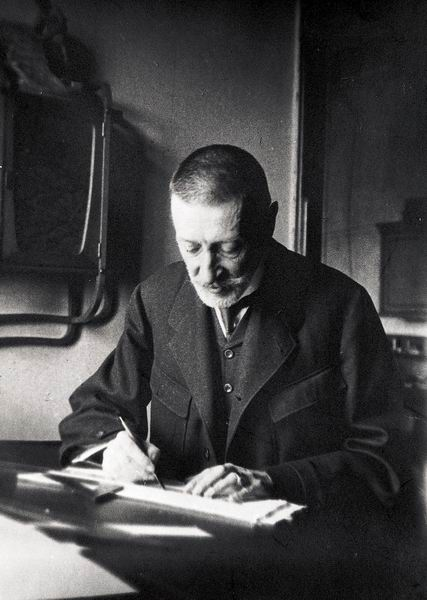
Emile von Szveties

At this time newspapers published in the Austro-Hungarian Empire had to be authorized by the government. The contemporary press laws did not apply to a telephone newspaper, and government officials were wary that the Telefon Hírmondó could develop into an "important tool of power", as it could potentially be used to quickly spread strategic, political, and social information. The Telefon Hírmondó had started operations based on an informal verbal approval, to demonstrate that the idea was practical. After two weeks of successful operation, on 2 March 1893 Puskás sent a letter to Béla Lukács, the Hungarian Minister of Trade, requesting formal authorization to run his "newspaper", under the provisions of the Act No. XXXXI of 1888. Included was a request to be assigned 50 years of exclusive rights for operation within the city of Budapest, although the government was eventually unwilling to approve this portion of the request.

Tividar Puskás died on 16 March 1893, just one month after the Telefon Hírmondó had been launched. His brother, Albert Puskás, took over responsibility for the service, moved the centre of operations to 24 Erzsébet Street, and resumed talks with the Hungarian government for formal operating authorisation. Included in these discussions were any fees that should be paid to the government, as well as limits on the operation's profits. Because the initial design had subscribers using their existing telephones to call the Telefon Hírmondó, there was a question as to how much the telephone company should be compensated for the use of its lines.

While these negotiations were ongoing, Albert Puskás sold the Telefon Hírmondó, along with the associated patent rights, to the engineer István Popper. Effective 26 September 1894, Popper accepted the governmental authorisation conditions. The permission to operate included the provision that the Telefon Hírmondó staff would write down news reports in advance and have them signed by both the manager and the announcer, with copies sent three times daily to the Budapest Royal Prosecutor and the Budapest Police Department, and on the following day to the relevant government ministries.

Popper created The Telefonhírmondó Joint stock company, modernized the equipment, and broadened the range of the programmes. In October 1894, the offices were moved to 22 Kerepesi street, with Emile von Szveties acting as the technical director. The company constructed its own one-way telephone network, independent of the local telephone company, to provide a continuous service to subscribers.

== Technology ==
In 1892, Puskás patented, in the Austro-Hungarian Empire, a telephone switchboard that included relay equipment used to simultaneously transmit telephonic sounds to multiple locations, describing his invention as "A new method of organizing and fitting a telephone newspaper". Additional patents were received internationally, including a Canadian grant, issued in 1893, which characterized the invention as a "Telephonic News Dispenser".

Initially the Telefon Hírmondó used telephone lines provided by the local telephone company to distribute its programmes. It later received permission to string its own lines and, under the guidance of its technical director, Nándor Szmazsenka, constructed a network that divided Budapest into twenty-seven districts. Starting with 43 miles (69 km) of wire, the systems expanded to 372 miles (599 km) in 1901, and 1,100 miles (1,800 km) in 1907. Twenty-seven copper wires ran from microphone receivers in the Opera House to the central office, where the current would pass through a patented device that increased the sound. A main wire ran to each district, with branch wires to individual houses. The distribution to subscribers was regulated by another patented device.

Vacuum-tube amplification would not be developed until the 1910s, so there were limited means for producing signals strong enough to be heard throughout the system. Therefore, for transmitting the news, announcers with especially loud voices — known as stentors — were hired and instructed to speak as forcefully as possible into specially designed double-receivers.

Home installations normally consisted of two earphone telephone receivers, connected to long, flexible wires. A subscriber could listen using both earphones, or, alternately, two persons could listen by each using a single earphone. A loud buzzer, strong enough to be heard throughout a room even when the subscriber's receivers were not currently being listened to, was used to draw attention to important announcements. The American author Thomas Denison, who visited Budapest in 1901, found that transmission of spoken news was "highly satisfactory", but the audio quality for musical programmes, whether vocal or instrumental, "still leaves something to be desired".

== Operations ==
Budapest Telefon Hírmondó (1901)

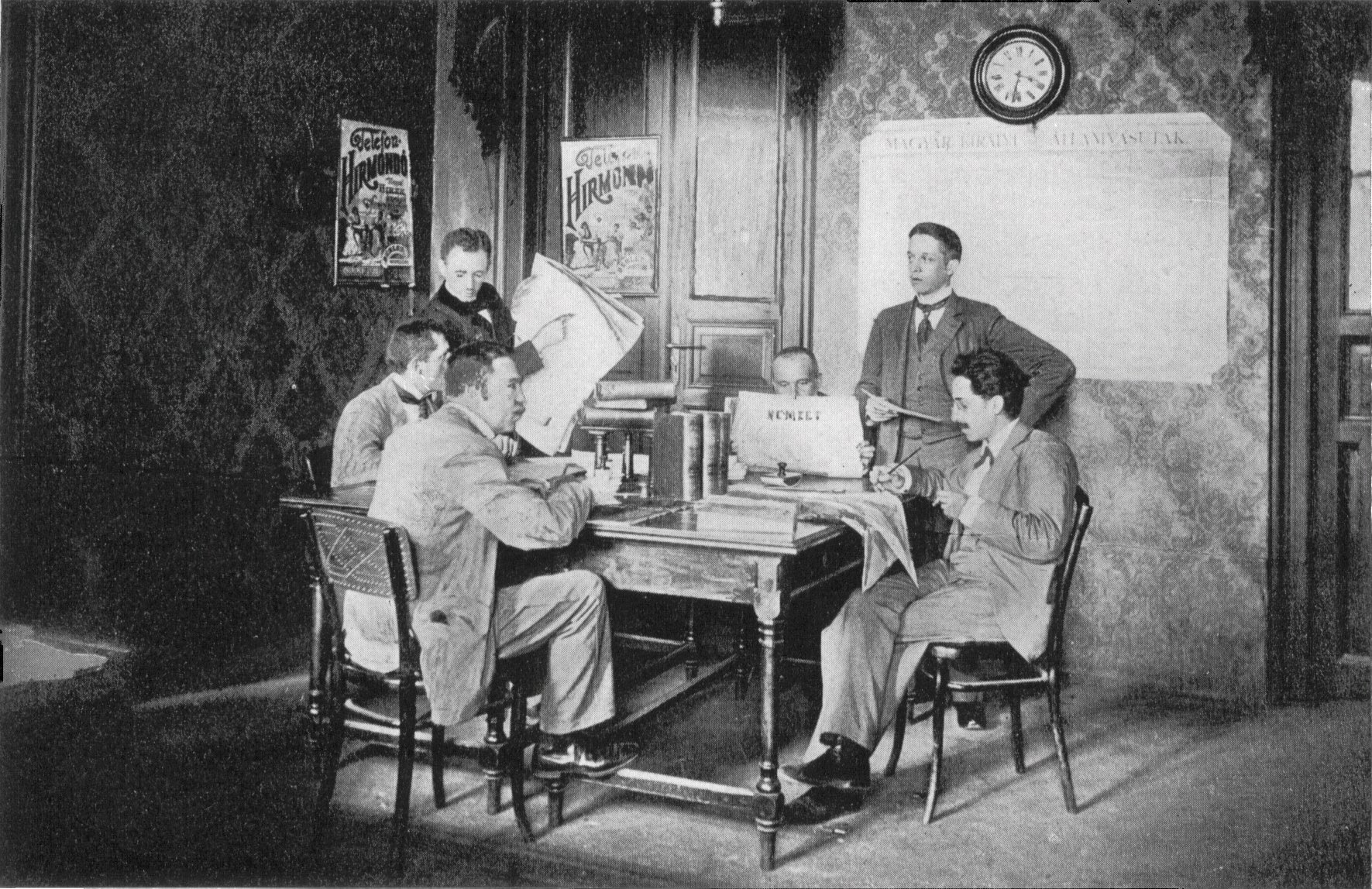
Staff reporters prepared the editorial content

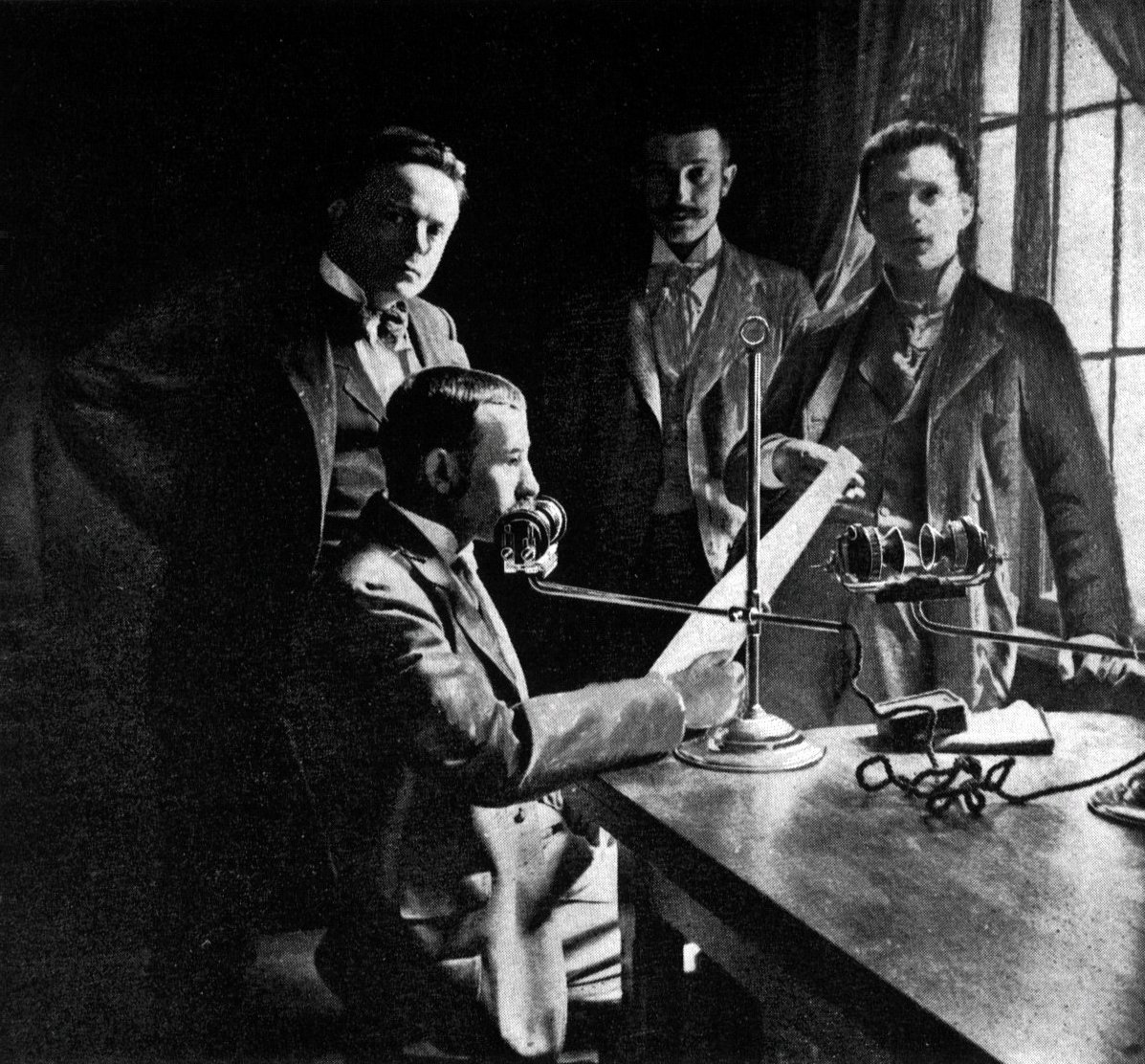
Stentor (announcer), reading the day's news into a double-receiver

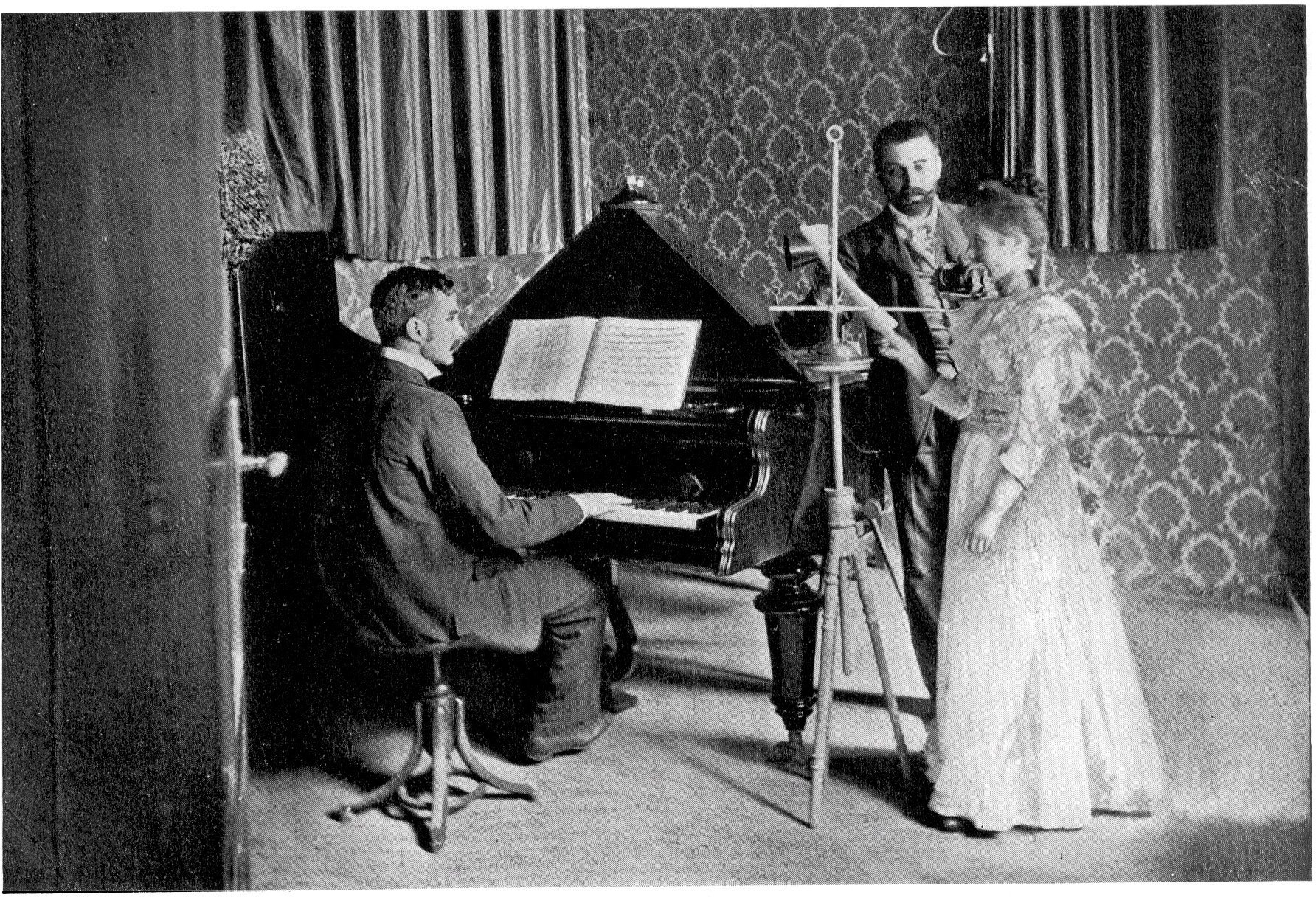
Concert Room

Subscribers received programme listings, reviewing the day's schedule, that could be posted on the wall above their receivers. The "newspaper issue" began with a news bulletin and newspaper article summaries. "Short entertaining stories," "sporting intelligence," and "filler items" of various kinds comprised the afternoon schedule. There were hourly news summaries for those who had missed the earlier bulletins. The evening schedule consisted of theatrical offerings, visits to the opera, poetry readings, concerts, lectures (including repeats of Academy lectures by notable literary figures), and linguistic lessons (in English, Italian and French).

Thomas S. Denison wrote in 1901 that the service began transmitting at 10:30 AM, and generally ended at about 10:30 PM, although it ran later in the case of a concert or some other night event. Stock exchange quotations were transmitted from 10:00 AM to 10:30 AM, 11:00 AM to 11:15 AM, 11:30 AM to 11:45 AM, and again in the afternoon hours. Reports of the Reichsrath and political news were given at 11:45 AM to 12:00 PM; when the Reichsrath was not in session, this period was filled by fuller reports of general and foreign news. At 1:30 PM and 6:00 PM a brief summary of news was provided. 5:00 PM to 6:00 PM was filled by concerts, varied by literary criticism, sporting events etc. On Sundays there were special items: news from 11:00 AM to 11:30 AM, and a concert from 4:30 PM to 6:00 PM. Thursdays featured a concert for children at 6:00 PM.

W. G. Fitz-Gerald stated the following schedule for a day's typical programme in 1907:

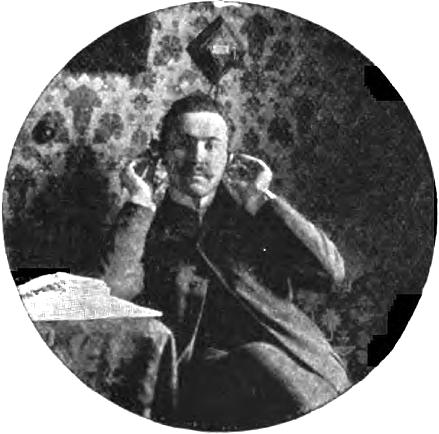
Home subscriber, listening through two earphones that are connected to the diamond-shaped wall panel directly behind him. (1901)

From	To	Programme schedule (1907)
9:00 AM		Exact astronomical time
9:30 AM	10:00 AM	Reading of programme of Vienna and foreign news and of chief contents of the official press.
10:00 AM	10:30 AM	Local exchange quotations.
10:30 AM	11:00 AM	Chief contents of local daily press.
11:00 AM	11:15 AM	General news and finance.
11:15 AM	11:30 AM	Local, theatrical, and sporting news.
11:30 AM	11:45 AM	Vienna exchange news.
11:45 AM	12:00 PM	Parliamentary, provincial, and foreign news.
12:00 PM		Exact astronomical time.
12:00 PM	12:30 PM	Latest general news, news, parliamentary, court, political, and military.
12:30 PM	1:00 PM	Midday exchange quotations.
1:00 PM	2:00 PM	Repetition of the half-day's most interesting news.
2:00 PM	2:30 PM	Foreign telegrams and latest general news.
2:30 PM	3:00 PM	Parliamentary and local news.
3:00 PM	3:15 PM	Latest exchange reports.
3:15 PM	4:00 PM	Weather, parliamentary, legal, theatrical, fashion and sporting news.
4:00 PM	4:30 PM	Latest exchange reports and general news.
4:30 PM	6:30 PM	Regimental bands.
7:00 PM	8:15 PM	Opera.
8:15 PM (or after the first act of the opera)		Exchange news from New York, Frankfurt, Paris, Berlin, London, and other business centers.
8:30	9:30	Opera.

In addition, special lectures or concerts for children were given once a week, and information for all the principal Hungarian and Austrian horse races was reported as soon as the results were known.

The Telefon Hírmondó news collection practices closely followed those commonly employed by print newspapers. A reporter would compose a story and submit it to the chief, who would sign it to fix responsibility. A clerk would then carefully copy the text with lithographic ink onto long galley slips which were transferred to a lithography stone, to be printed in parallel columns 6 inches wide and two feet long (16 cm x 60 cm). Then, two pressmen would take a number of impressions on a roller-movement hand press, using common printing paper. Each sheet was proofread by an assistant editor, with help of a copyholder. The verified sheet comprised part of the daily programme, and was added to the day's file along with the other sheets. A duplicate was cut up into convenient strips for the reading by the stentors.

Although the Telefon Hírmondó had much in common with newspaper publications, it had no leading articles or editorials. The editor alone was responsible in case of action against the paper for libel. By 1901, there had been two or three lawsuits against the editor, and he had prevailed in all the cases. The service exchanged reports with the city newspapers, and the editors and managers of the Telefon Hírmondó received the same usual courtesies extended to the newspapers, such as passes and free tickets.

== Staff ==
In 1901, the Telefon Hírmondó employed about 180 people during winter and 150 in the summer. The staff consisted of a business manager, an editor-in-chief, four assistant editors, and nine reporters. The only ladies among the staff were those who sang in the concerts. At this time the service employed six stentors in the winter: four for duty, and two for alternates. Due to the effort required to speak loudly into the transmitters, readers took turns of ten minutes each. The stentors had strong and clear voices with distinct articulation to maintain clarity of sound over the telephone lines. In the summer, four stentors sufficed. In cases where only two stentors were on duty, they took turns of half an hour maximum. By 1907, the system had a staff of over two hundred people, including two business managers, two principal editors, six sub-editors, twelve reporters, and eight stentors.

== Subscribers ==
The "Telefon-Hirmondo" has proved a real boon to this great city. For one thing it gives news of great importance far sooner than any printed daily can put it before the public. It is the delight of women and children, and is a real entertainment to the sick in their homes, to patients in hospitals, the blind, and all those who have neither time nor money to go to theater, concert, or opera.

— W. G. Fitz-Gerald, Scientific American 1907.

Telefon Hírmondó began operations in 1893 with 60 subscribers, a total that grew to 700 in 1894, 4915 in 1895, 7629 in 1899, around 6200 in 1901, and 15,000 by 1907. Some of the notable subscribers included the Emperor Francis Joseph, the prime minister Baron Banffy, all the other members of the Hungarian Cabinet, Hungarian author Mór Jókai, and the Mayor of Budapest. The Telefon Hírmondó appealed strongly to the more intellectual classes. The principal hotels in the city also subscribed to the service, and their guests were free to use the instrument. The service could also be found in other places, including doctors' waiting rooms, barber shops, cafes, restaurants, and dentists' parlours.

Thomas S. Denison wrote in the April 1901 issue of The World's Work:

The paper is so well known and has accomplished so much that it appears to be beyond the stage of experiment so far as Budapest is concerned. One strong point in its favor is its early reports. In this respect the paper has a strong hold, for it is able to issue an "extra" at any hour of the day. Moreover, invalids and busy people may get as much news as they want with little effort. Indeed, the plan has so many advantages, that we shall probably soon see it in operation on this side of the ocean, with the improvements that Yankee ingenuity will be sure to devise.

== Business model ==
In 1901, the expenses of the newspaper ranged between 9,000 and 10,000 krones per month (a krone was about 42 U.S. cents at that time). The fixed charges (telegrams, salaries, rent etc.) were about 7000 krones a month, and varied with the seasons.

The annual subscription price of the service was 18 krones (the price of 10 kg sugar or 20 kg coffee in Budapest at that time). A receiver would be put into the subscriber's house at the company's expense. The subscriber was obliged to give security for a year's subscription, one-third of which had to be paid when the equipment was ready for use. The balance had to be paid in two equal installments, at the end of four months and eight months respectively.

Short advertising messages were sandwiched between two interesting news items, so that they would command special attention. In 1901, advertisers were charged one krone for a twelve-second message. The system also experimented with coin-operated receivers located in public places, that took 20-Fillér coins.

In the 1920s, the company was granted the right to establish the first radio broadcasting station in Budapest, which began operating on 1 December 1925. The combined operations were now known as the Magyar Telefon Hirmondó és Rádió. The services were offered in parallel for some time, both on radio waves and telephone wires. By 1930, Telefon Hírmondó had started other services, and it had 91,079 subscribers. During World War II, the wire network was destroyed, resulting in the cessation of telephone news services.

== Offshoots ==
The Telefon Hírmondó's technology was patented in a number of countries, and in 1910 the rights to its use was licensed for the establishment of the Araldo Telefonico (Italian for "Telephone Herald") in Rome, Italy. By 1914 Araldo Telefonico surpassed 1300 subscribers. The service was interrupted during World War I, and was re-launched in 1922, under the name Fonogiornale.

Manley M. Gillam, a former advertising manager of the New York Herald, encountered the Telefon Hírmondó while touring Hungary, and obtained the American rights. In 1909 he established the United States Telephone Herald Company, which supported associate companies established throughout the United States. Two of these briefly conducted commercial operations: the New Jersey Telephone Herald Company, located in Newark, New Jersey, from 1911 to 1912, and the Oregon Telephone Herald Company, located in Portland, Oregon, during 1912-1913.

== Legacy ==
There have been varying opinions whether the Telefon Hírmondó should be considered the first "broadcasting" operation, in part due to differing definitions of the term, including semantic differences, involving issues such as audience size, geographic coverage, and whether the transmission is by wire or wireless. Another factor is the ongoing evolution of the technologies used for the electronic distribution of news and entertainment, including the introduction of radio broadcasting in the early 1920s, followed by wired systems such as cable TV, and still later by hybrid approaches including audio streaming over the Internet.

A 1929 Chicago Daily News article that reviewed the history of the Telefon Hírmondó stated that the service's introduction qualified as "the first broadcasting". In 1967, reviewing the history of organized distributed audio in general, David L. Woods concluded that "The Telephonic Newspaper of Budapest marked the first regular 'broadcasting' operation." However, a 1977 analysis of "broadcasting's oldest stations" by Joseph E. Baudino and John M. Kittross discounted Woods' conclusion, and explicitly eliminated the Telefon Hírmondó from consideration, explaining that "we prefer to restrict ourselves to radio broadcasting".

Andrew Orlowski has called the Telefon Hírmondó service "a historical antecedent" of the WAP and mobile data services. Carolyn Marvin states that Telefon Hírmondó can be seen as a "proto-broadcasting system", and An Nguyen notes that it might also fit into the definition of online news as the content was delivered over a point-to-point communication network only to selected users.

Using news, literary and musical pieces that were transmitted through Telefon Hirmondó in 1897, Első Pesti Egyetemi Rádió, a Budapest based university station, for the first time, reconstructed a full "broadcast day". It was transmitted live via telephone from the same room where Telefon Hirmondó operated.

== See also ==
- Telephone newspaper
- Cable radio
- Théâtrophone
- Electrophone (information system)
