= Telephone newspaper =

Early electronic broadcasting method

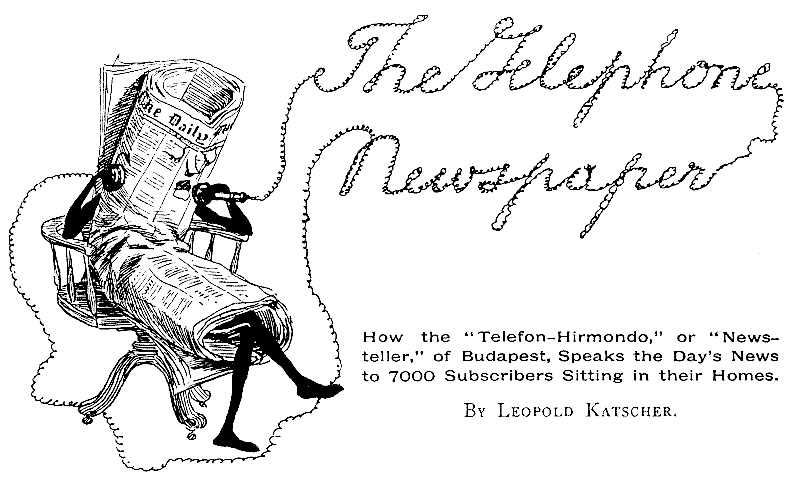
1901 illustration.

Telephone newspapers, introduced in the 1890s, transmitted news and entertainment to subscribers over telephone lines. They were the first example of electronic broadcasting, although only a few were established, most commonly in European cities. These systems predated the development, in the 1920s, of radio broadcasting. They were eventually supplanted by radio stations, because radio signals could more easily cover much wider areas with higher quality audio, without incurring the cost of a telephone line infrastructure.

== History ==
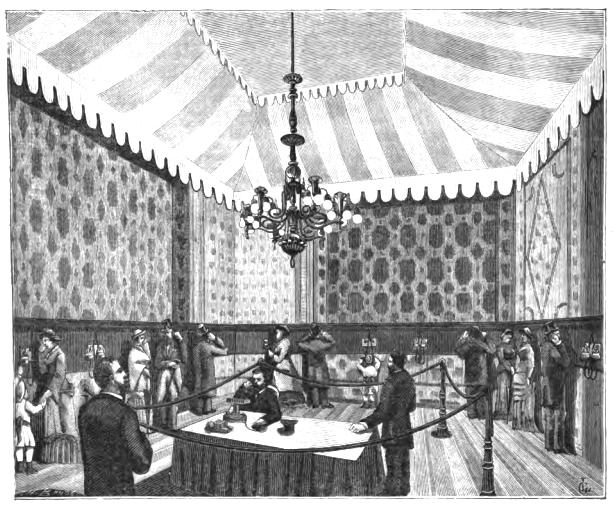
Listening room at the 1881 Paris Electrical Exhibition

The introduction of the telephone in the mid-1870s included numerous demonstrations of its use for transmitting musical concerts over various distances. In one particularly advanced example, Clément Ader prepared a listening room at the 1881 Paris Electrical Exhibition, where attendees could listen to performances, in stereo, from the Paris Grand Opera. The concept also appeared in Edward Bellamy's influential 1888 utopian novel, Looking Backward: 2000-1887, which foresaw audio entertainment sent over telephone lines to private homes.

The initial scattered demonstrations were followed by the development of more organized services transmitting news and entertainment, which were collectively called "telephone newspapers". (The term "pleasure telephone" was also sometimes used in reference to the more entertainment-oriented operations.) However, the technical capabilities of the time — vacuum tube amplification would not become practical until the 1920s — meant that there were limited means for amplifying and relaying telephone signals to multiple sites over long distances, so service areas were generally limited to a single jurisdiction, and in most cases listeners needed to use headphones to hear the programs.

During this era telephones were often costly, near-luxury items, so subscribers tended to be among the well-to-do. Financing for the systems was normally done by charging fees, including monthly subscriptions for home users, and, in locations such as hotel lobbies, through the use of coin-operated receivers, which provided short periods of listening for a set payment. Some systems also accepted paid advertising.

While some of the systems, including the Telefon Hírmondó, built their own one-way transmission lines, others, including the Electrophone, used the existing commercial telephone lines, which allowed subscribers to talk to operators in order to select programs. Programming often originated from the system's own studios, although outside sources were also used, including local theaters and church services, where special telephone lines carried the transmissions to the distributing equipment. In two cases, the Telefon Hírmondó and the Araldo Telefonico, the systems were later merged with radio station operations, becoming relays for the radio programs.

== Individual systems ==
Below is a chronological overview of some of the systems that were developed.

=== Théâtrophone (Paris, France) ===
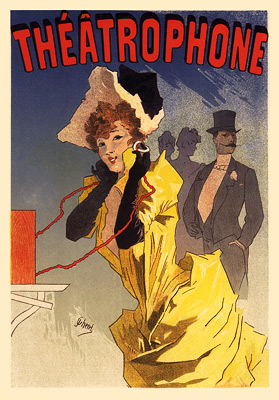
Le théatrophone (1896)

The first organized telephone-based entertainment service appears to be the Théâtrophone, which went into operation in Paris, France in 1890. This system evolved from Clément Ader's demonstration at the 1881 Paris Electrical Exhibition by Compagnie du Théâtrophone of MM. Marinovitch and Szarvady. Although the service received most of its programming from lines run to local theaters, it also included regular five-minute news summaries. Home listeners could connect to the service, with an 1893 report stating that the system had grown to over 1,300 subscribers. The company also established coin-operated receivers, in locations such as hotels, charging 50 centimes for five minutes of listening, and one franc for twice as long.

By 1925, the system had adopted vacuum tube amplification, which allowed listeners to hear over loudspeakers instead of headphones. The service continued in operation until 1932, when it was found it could no longer compete with radio broadcasting.

=== Telefon Hírmondó (Budapest, Hungary) ===
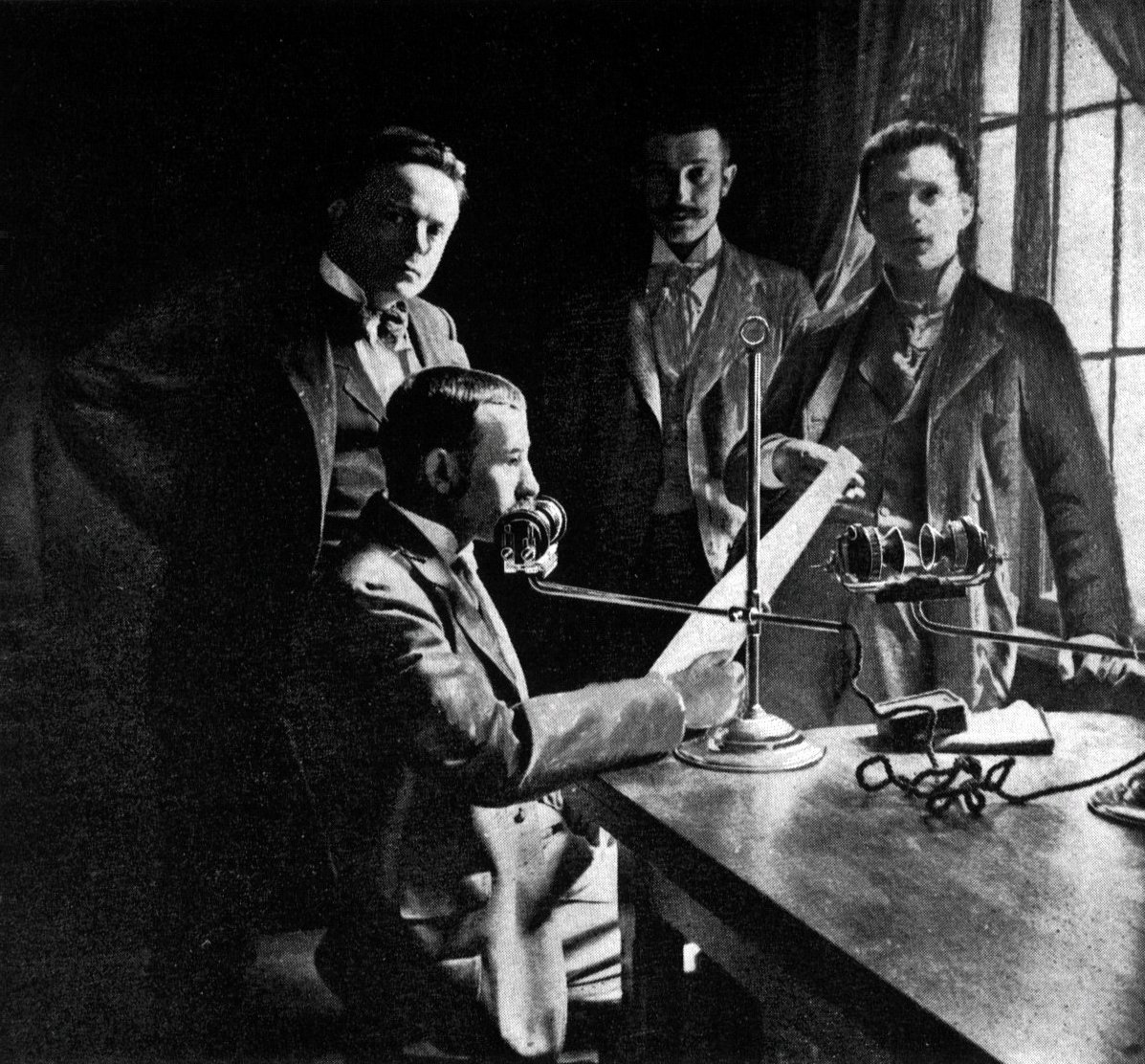
A Telefon Hírmondó "stentor" (announcer) reading the day's news (1901)

The Telefon Hírmondó — the name was generally translated into English as the "Telephone Herald" or "Telephone News-teller" — was created by inventor and telephone engineer Tivadar Puskás.

Puskás had participated in Clément Ader's demonstration at the 1881 Paris Electrical Exhibition. He had also been an important early developer of the telephone switchboard, and he later developed the basic technology for transmitting a single audio source to multiple telephones. On February 15, 1893 the Telefon Hírmondó, which would become the most prominent and longest-lived of all the Telephone Newspaper systems, began operating in the Pest section of Budapest. The system eventually offered a wide assortment of news, stock quotations, concerts and linguistic lessons.

Tivadar Puskás died just one month after the system went into operation, after which his brother assumed responsibility for the system. The Telefon Hírmondó was classified and regulated by the Hungarian government as a newspaper, with a designated editor-in-chief legally responsible for content. Both the Italian Araldo Telefonico and the United States Telephone Herald Company later licensed the Telefon Hírmondó technology for use in their respective countries.

The limited means for signal amplification required that the Telefon Hírmondó employ strong-voiced "stentors" to speak loudly into double-cased telephones, so that they could be heard throughout the system by listeners that used headphones. A loud buzzer, which could be heard throughout a room even when the service was not being actively monitored, was used to draw attention to important transmissions. Service was supplied to private homes as well as commercial establishments, including hotels and doctor's offices. At its peak, the service had thousands of subscribers, and many contemporary reviews mentioned that the subscription price was quite reasonable.

Initially the Telefon Hírmondó provided a short hourly news program using subscriber's regular phone lines. This was soon expanded into a continuous service, now using the company's own dedicated lines. Its schedule in 1907 was as follows:

A. M.
9:00	—		. .	Exact astronomical time.
9:30	—	10:00	. .	Reading of programme of Vienna and foreign news and of chief contents of the official press.
10:00	—	10:30	. .	Local exchange quotations.
10:30	—	11:00	. .	Chief contents of local daily press.
11:00	—	11:15	. .	General news and finance.
11:15	—	11:30	. .	Local, theatrical, and sporting news.
11:30	—	11:45	. .	Vienna exchange news.
11:45	—	12:00	. .	Parliamentary, provincial, and foreign news.
12:00	noon		. .	Exact astronomical time.
P. M.
12:00	—	12:30	. .	Latest general news, news, parliamentary, court, political, and military.
12:30	—	1:00	. .	Midday exchange quotations.
1:00	—	2:00	. .	Repetition of the half-day's most interesting news.
2:00	—	2:30	. .	Foreign telegrams and latest general news.
2:30	—	3:00	. .	Parliamentary and local news.
3:00	—	3:15	. .	Latest exchange reports.
3:15	—	4:00	. .	Weather, parliamentary, legal, theatrical, fashion and sporting news.
4:00	—	4:30	. .	Latest exchange reports and general news.
4:30	—	6:30	. .	Regimental bands.
7:00	—	8:15	. .	Opera.
8:15	(or after			the first act of the opera). . Exchange news from New York, Frankfurt, Paris, Berlin, London, and other business centers.
8:30	—	9:30	. .	Opera.

Radio broadcasting was introduced in Hungary in 1925 with the establishment of Radio Hirmondó, which shared the Telefon Hírmondó studios. With this transition the Telefon Hírmondó became an audio relay system, available for persons who wanted to listen to the radio station without the trouble and expense of purchasing a radio receiver. During World War II the wire network of the company was destroyed, leading to the cessation of the telephone-based service in 1944.

=== Electrophone (London, U.K.) ===
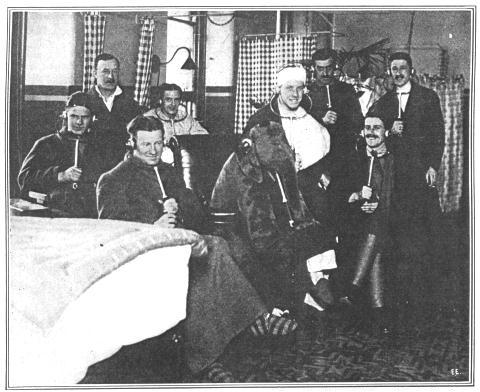
Hospitalized British soldiers, joined by their toy elephant mascot (center), enjoying the Electrophone service (1917)

The Electrophone, established in London in 1895, was similar in operation to the Paris Théâtrophone. The company worked closely with the National Telephone Company, and later with the British Post Office, which took over the national telephone system in 1912. The service's main focus was live theatre and music hall shows, plus, on Sundays, church services. On a few special occasions, it also shared programs with the Théâtrophone, employing a telephone line that crossed the English Channel. Listeners ranged from hospital patients to Queen Victoria.

For locations such as restaurants, coin-operated receivers were installed that provided a few minutes of live entertainment for a sixpenny. Home subscribers accessed Electrophone programming through their regular telephone lines, by calling an operator for a connection to one of a multiple of program offering. Because this tied-up the subscriber's line, incoming calls could not be received while listening to the Electrophone, although operators were instructed to break-in in case of emergency. The rare home that had two telephone lines could use one to receive the Electrophone service, and the other to call the operators to change their selection.

The Electrophone ceased operations in 1925, unable to compete with radio. During its thirty years, the service generally had a few hundred subscribers, although by 1923 the number had risen to 2,000.

=== Tellevent (Detroit, Michigan, U.S.) ===
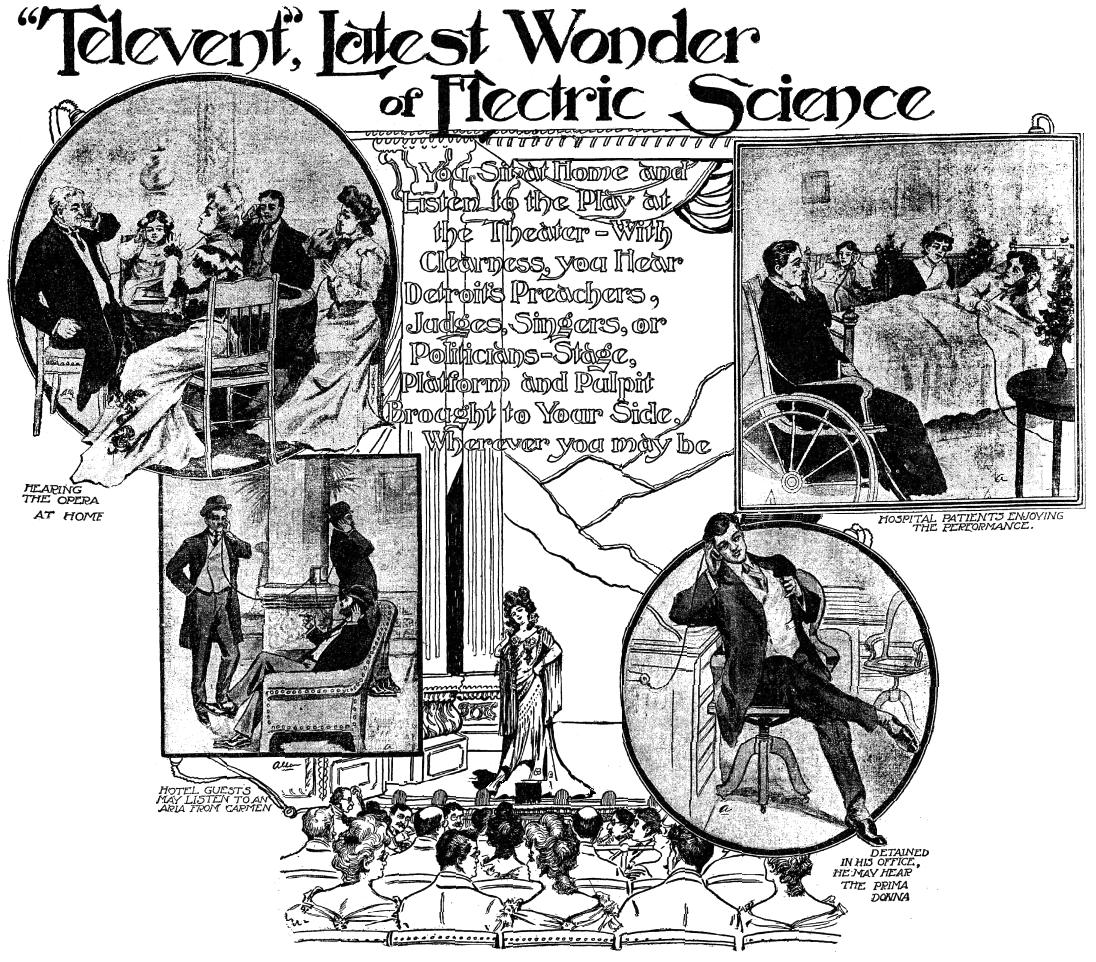
Illustration from Tellevent promotional article (1907)

The Tellevent (also spelled Televent) was the first organized attempt to develop a subscription telephone newspaper service in the United States. The name was a contraction of the phrase: "It tells the event to mind's eye." The main promoter was the Michigan State Telephone Company's general manager, James F. Land, who had been influenced by the Telefon Hírmondó, although his company did not license that system's technology.

Test transmissions throughout the state of Michigan began in 1906, initially "between the theatres, the churches, the Light Guard Armory, the new Penobscot Inn and the residences of several officials of the company". Additional test transmissions continued through 1908. In March 1907, the American Tellevent Company was incorporated in Michigan, and Land resigned from the Michigan State Telephone Company, where he had worked for nearly 30 years, in order to work full-time with the recently founded Michigan Tellevent Company.

An early review reported that the service used subscriber's existing telephone lines, and had been recently installed in 100 Detroit homes, connecting them with local theaters. An extensive daily program was also envisioned, with plans that "there will be a televent at the stock exchange, banks, at the band concerts on Belle Isle, race track, club houses, hotels, library, political headquarters, court rooms, in short, wherever the public wishes to go". Also planned was the option to connect to special services, such as ballgames and speeches. Subscription costs were estimated to be around $2 a month, with service provided to private homes, businesses, hotels, and hospitals.

Despite hopes to eventually expand nationally, the Tellevent never advanced beyond the exploratory stage, and the Michigan Tellevent Company was dissolved in 1909.

=== Tel-musici (Wilmington, Delaware, U.S.) ===
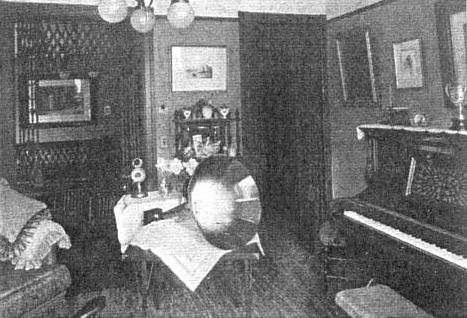
Tel-musici service home installation (1909)

The Tel-musici was initially developed to send requested phonograph recordings, transmitted from a central "music room", to households that listened using loudspeakers called "magnaphones". The primary individual behind the Tel-musici was inventor George R. Webb. In early 1908, a Tel-musici company, with a capitalization of $10,000, was incorporated in the state of Delaware by "a number of Baltimorians", and the service began operation in Wilmington the next year, with George Webb as the company president, and J. J. Comer the general manager. The charge was three cents for each requested standard tune, and seven cents for grand opera. Subscribers were required to guarantee purchases totaling $18 per year.

The Wilmington system was later taken over by the Wilmington and Philadelphia Traction Co. The service added live programs, expanding its offerings to be more along the lines of a general telephone newspaper operation.

The promoters worked to convince local telephone companies to install their own Tel-musici operations, however, although there were plans to expand throughout the United States, only the Wilmington location, which ceased operations around 1914, ever became operational.

=== Araldo Telefonico (Italy) ===
The Araldo Telefonico — Italian for "Telephone Herald" — licensed the technology used by the Telefon Hírmondó for use throughout Italy. Luigi Ranieri, an Italian engineer who represented the Construction Mécaniques Escher Wyss and Company of Zurich, Switzerland, applied for permission to install systems in Rome, Milan, and Naples. In August 1909 the Italian government authorized a Rome operation, which began service the next year, with a schedule similar to the Telefon Hírmondó's.

The Rome system surpassed 1,300 subscribers by 1914, but suspended operations in 1916 due to World War I. The Rome facility was relaunched in 1922. It was joined by systems in the city of Milan, plus, in late 1921, in Bologna—this last system survived until 1943. Beginning in 1923 a Rome radio station, "Radio Araldo", was added. In 1924 Radio Araldo joined with additional private Italian companies to form the radio broadcasting company Unione Radiofonica Italiana (URI); in 1928 the URI became Ente Italiano per le Audizioni Radiofoniche (EIAR), and finally, in 1944, Radio Audizioni Italiane (RAI).

=== Telephone Herald (Newark, New Jersey and Portland, Oregon, U.S.) ===
The United States Telephone Herald Company was founded in 1909, to act as the parent corporation for regional Telephone Herald systems established throughout the United States, with "the parent company to receive a royalty on every instrument installed". (In some cases the service was also referred to as the "telectrophone".) At least a dozen associate companies were chartered, with publicity for these services commonly stating that subscriptions would cost 5 cents a day, but only two systems ever went into commercial operation — one based in Newark, New Jersey (New Jersey Telephone Herald, 1911-1912) and the other in Portland, Oregon (Oregon Telephone Herald, 1912-1913). Moreover, both of these systems were shut down after operating for only a short time, due to economic and technical issues.

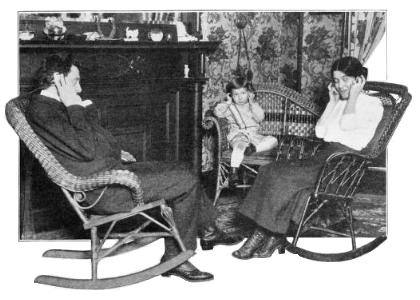
New Jersey Telephone Herald (Newark, 1912)

Following a visit to Hungary, Cornelius Balassa procured the U.S. patent rights to the technology used by the Budapest Telefon Hírmondó. (Later reports state that the company also held the rights for Canada and Great Britain.) The parent company, announced in October 1909, was organized by Manley M. Gillam, and initially operated under a New York state charter as the "Telephone Newspaper Company of America". This was reorganized as the "United States Telephone Herald Company" in March 1910, now operating under a Delaware corporation charter. An initial transmission demonstration was given at the company headquarters, located at 110 West Thirty-fourth Street in New York City, in early September 1910.

Of the two Telephone Herald affiliates which launched commercial services, the New Jersey Telephone Herald, incorporated in October 1910 in Newark, New Jersey, was both the first and most publicized. On October 24, 1911 an ambitious daily service, closely patterned after the Telefon Hírmondó's, was launched to a reported fifty receivers located in a department store waiting room, plus five hundred Newark homes. The company's central offices, studio, and switch rooms were located in the Essex Building on Clinton Street in Newark. Condit S. Atkinson, who had extensive newspaper experience, headed the service's news department.

The company reported that there were many persons eager to sign up, and it soon had more potential subscribers than could be supported. However, the service quickly ran into serious technical and financial difficulties, which resulted in employees walking off the job due to missed paychecks, and operations were suspended in late February 1912. A fresh source of funding resulted in a temporary revival in late May, with C. S. Atkinson renewing his editor functions. However, continuing problems resulted in the transmissions permanently ceasing by December 1912. Following the termination of operations, the New Jersey Telephone Herald's business charter was declared null and void on January 18, 1916.

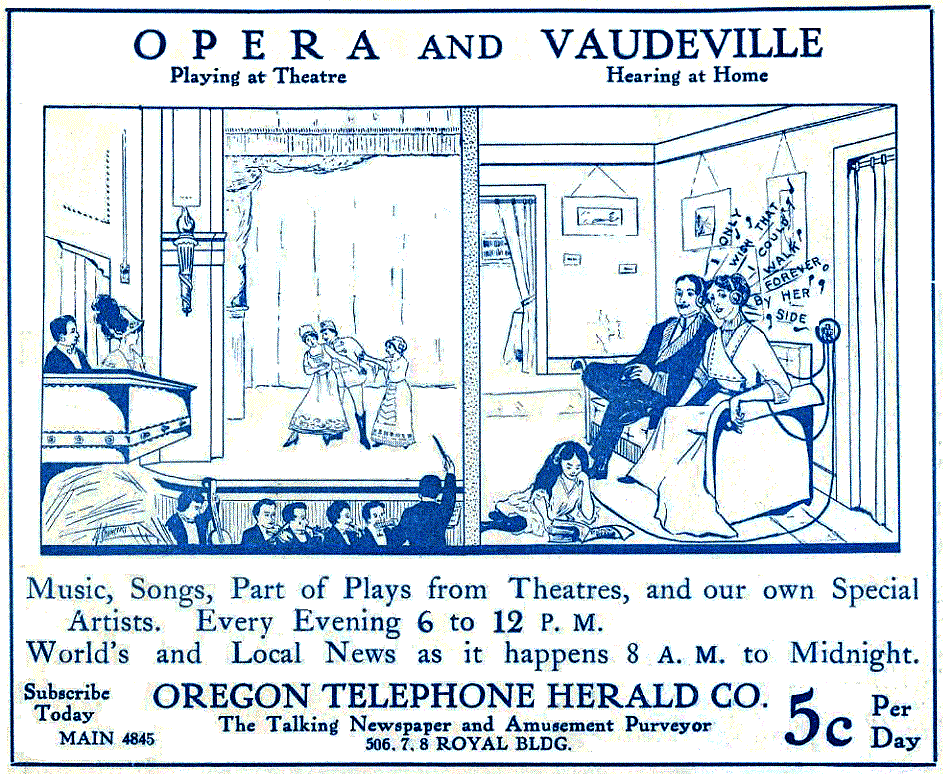
Oregon Telephone Herald (Portland, 1913)

The second Telephone Herald company to implement an ongoing telephone newspaper service was the Oregon Telephone Herald Company, based in Portland. The company was incorporated in Oregon, and headquartered at 506 Royal Building (Seventh and Morrison). Extensive demonstrations began in May 1912, and advertisements the next month said commercial service would start "around October 1st".

A January 1913 solicitation for home subscribers listed the hours of operation as 8:00 AM to midnight. Later advertisements referred to the service as the "Te-Lec-Tro-Phone", and April saw the introduction of the reporting of local Portland Beavers baseball games. A promotion the following month offered the chance to hear election results for free at twenty-five business sites. In May, the Portland Hotel advertised that diners could listen to "the latest baseball, business and other news by Telephone-Herald" with their meals.

There appears to have been a company reorganization in early 1913, but, as with its New Jersey predecessor, the Portland enterprise was facing financial trouble. In August 1913 the state of Oregon, acting under the provisions of its "Blue Sky Law", barred the Oregon Telephone Herald from doing business. The final advertisements for the company appeared in June 1913, and the state corporation charter was terminated on January 16, 1917, for failure to file statements or pay fees for two years.

Corporation activity for the parent United States Telephone Herald Company peaked in 1913, but the lack of success caused the company to suspend operations, and its corporation charter was repealed in early 1918.

=== Musolaphone (Chicago, Illinois, U.S.) ===
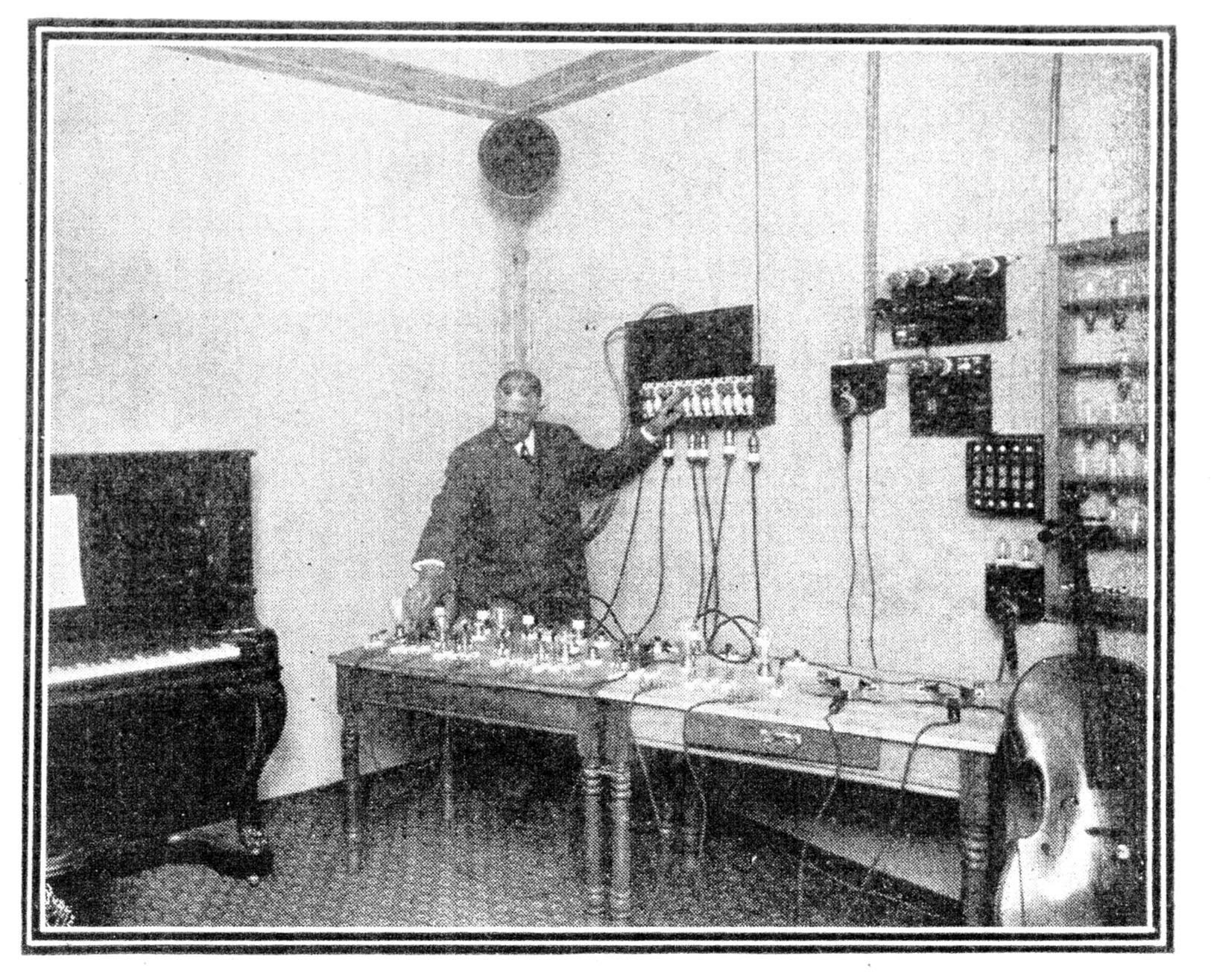
John J. Comer, inventor, demonstrating the Chicago Musolaphone transmission equipment (1914)

The Musolaphone (also marketed as the Multa Musola) was developed by the Automatic Electric Company of Chicago, Illinois to use its "Automatic Enunciator" loudspeakers to transmit entertainment over telephone lines to subscribing homes and businesses. In 1910 the Automatic Electric Company announced its new loudspeaker, with uses including: "An automatic enunciator, by which a man talking in New York can be heard in every part of a large room in Chicago... may make it possible for a public speaker to address a million or more people at one time... Running descriptions of baseball games, or prize fights can be sent over long distances for the entertainment of sporting fans of all varieties."

In 1910 the Automatic Enunciator Company was formed in Chicago to market the invention. Initially, Automatic Enunciators were employed in public address systems. In the summer of 1912 the company began demonstrations in Portland, Oregon, under the name Multa Musola, and in the spring of the next year, advertisements for the Oregon Enunciator Company entertainment system appeared, promoting both home and business service. However, there is no evidence that the Portland Multa Musola service ever began operation, and later that year the state of Oregon, acting under its "Blue Sky" law, prohibited the Oregon Enunciator Company from doing business, due to concerns about its financial viability.

An experimental commercial Musolaphone service was established in south-side Chicago in 1913, working in conjunction with the Illinois Telephone & Telegraph Co. John J. Comer, former general manager of the Tel-musici installation at Wilmington, Delaware, was described as the inventor. An early 1914 report reviewed the Chicago Musolaphone's daily schedule, which began daily at 8:00 a.m., and included news, weather reports, and the exact time at noon, followed by musical programs, "a running description of ball games of the home team and scores by innings of other teams in both leagues during the baseball season", and the "announcement of special bargain sales at the leading stores".

Subscribers were charged $3 a week for the service. The effort was short-lived, however, and discontinued sometime in 1914. In early 1914, it was announced that the Federal Telephone Company of Buffalo, New York was planning to establish its own Musolaphone service, but it appears that no other systems were ever established.

=== Fonogiornale (Milan, Italy) ===
The Milan Fonogiornale ("Phonojournal" in English) company was founded on July 22, 1918 by a Milanese group, including Giuseppe Sommariva, the Jarach Brothers of the Jarach Bank, and journalist Beniamino Gutierrez. Luigi Ranieri provided administrative services.

The Fonogiornale's primary orientation was toward entertainment, with its offerings described as "lectures, melodramas, and public concerts from the well-known Milanese theaters". Although the system operated for ten years, it eventually failed financially, and on November 21, 1928 the company's board of directors moved to liquidate the company.

=== Grapevine radio (South Carolina, U.S.) ===
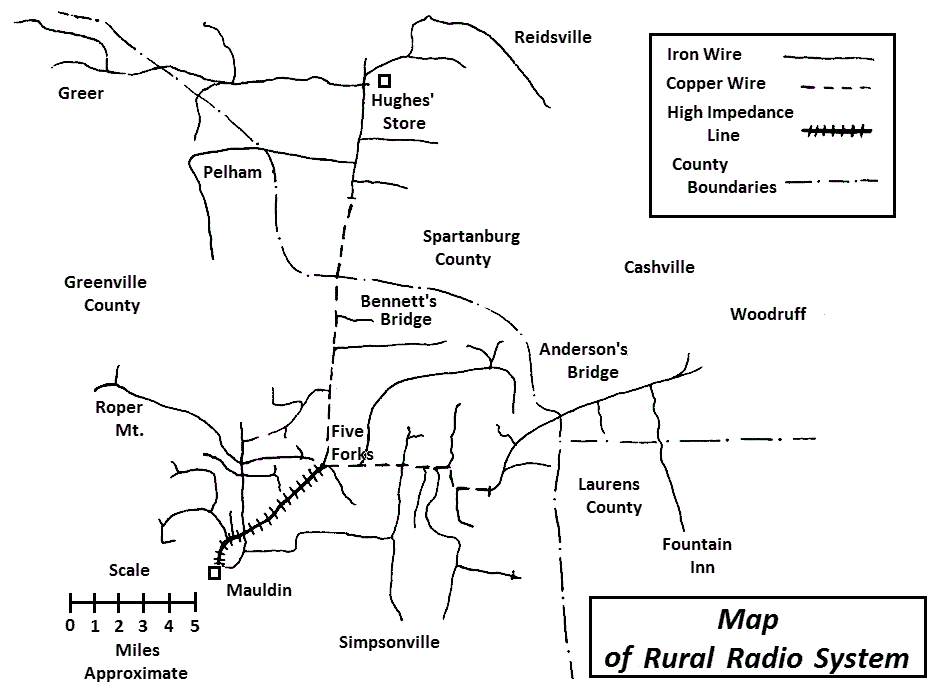
Mauldin, South Carolina "grapevine radio" wire network as of 1936.

"Grapevine radio" was the commonly used name for approximately ten community networks established in rural upstate South Carolina. They were in operation from the early 1930s to the mid-1940s, and each served a few hundred local homes. The programming was distributed from a central site, using equipment in a location such as the back room of a general store, and normally consisted of programs picked up from radio stations which were re-transmitted over the facility's wire network. Local programming was also provided, originating from a studio at the distribution site, or relayed from a local church or other gathering place. The locally produced programming included announcements and emergency messages, commercials and live performances.

The first grapevine system was established by Gordon F. Rogers, operating from his home in Mauldin, South Carolina. The grapevine systems soon became unneeded, because they primarily served homes that did not have electricity. Once a community received electric service the local grapevine system would close down, as the subscribers switched to radio receivers that could receive a wide selection of programs, instead of the single program heard by all the subscribers over the grapevine systems.
