= The Luck of the Irish =

The Luck of the Irish may refer to:

== Film ==
- The Luck of the Irish (1920 film)
- The Luck of the Irish (1936 film)
- The Luck of the Irish (1948 film)
- The Luck of the Irish (2001 film)

== Literature ==
- The Luck of the Irish, a 1917 novel by Harold MacGrath
- The Luck of the Irish, a 1995 non-fiction book by Christine Breen and Niall Williams

== Music ==
- "The Luck of the Irish" (song), a song by John Lennon and Yoko Ono from Some Time in New York City

== Television ==
- "Luck o’ the Irish", Annoying Orange season 2, episode 9 (2010)
- "Luck o’ the Irish", Early Edition season 4, episode 22 (2000)
- "Luck o’ the Irish", Judge Roy Bean episode 37 (1956)
- "Luck o’ the Irish", Mickey episode 14 (1964)
- "Luck of the Irish", Bering Sea Gold special 4 (2017)
- "Luck of the Irish", Brunch at Bobby's season 1, episode 4 (2010)
- "Luck of the Irish", Chopped season 37, episode 1 (2018)
- "Luck of the Irish", Doki season 2, episode 10b (2015)
- "Luck of the Irish", Inspector Gadget (1983) season 1, episode 43 (1983)
- "Luck of the Irish", Moonshiners season 6, episode 4 (2016)
- "Luck of the Irish", My Lottery Dream Home season 5, episode 11 (2018)
- "Luck of the Irish", Sooty & Co. series 5, episode 8 (1997)
- "Scooby's Luck of the Irish", Scooby-Doo and Scrappy-Doo (1980) season 2, episode 3c (1981)
- "The Luck of the Irish?", After Dark series 4, edition 10 (1991)
- "The Luck of the Irish", Big Deal series 1, episode 5 (1984)
- "The Luck of the Irish", Big Fat Gypsy Weddings special 5 (2013)
- "The Luck of the Irish", Blue Heelers season 4, episode 7 (1997)
- "The Luck of the Irish", Death Valley Days season 5, episode 14 (1957)
- "The Luck of the Irish", Extreme Ghostbusters episode 21 (1997)
- "The Luck of the Irish", Love & War season 3, episode 9 (1994)
- "The Luck of the Irish", The Misadventures of Sheriff Lobo season 1, episode 13 (1980)
- "The Luck of the Irish", The Revenge Files of Alistair Fury episode 6 (2008)
- "The Luck of the Irish", Z-Cars series 6, episode 139–140 (1968)

== See also ==
- Bad luck
- Good luck (disambiguation)
- Irish Luck
- Luck of the Draw (disambiguation)
- The Luck o' the Foolish, a 1924 American silent short film
- "Huck of the Irish", The Huckleberry Hound Show season 4, episode 2a (1961)
- "The Luck o' the ...?", Francie and Josie series 3, episode 8 (1965)
- "Mine is the Luck of the Irish", Please Don't Eat the Daisies season 1, episode 29 (1966)
- "The Luck of the Iris", Too Close for Comfort season 3, episode 5 (1982)
- "Luck o' the Ducks", DuckTales (1987) season 1, episode 49 (1987)
- "The Luck o' the Pinkish", The Pink Panther season 1, episode 28b (1993)
- "Luck of the Spookish", The Spooktacular New Adventures of Casper season 2, episode 11a (1997)
- "The Luck of the Fryrish", Futurama season 3, episode 4 (2001)
- "The Luck of the Ed", Ed, Edd n Eddy season 3, episode 10a (2002)
- "Luck o’ the Irish Cottage", Treehouse Masters season 1, episode 8 (2013)
- "The Luck of the Grindish", Wild Grinders season 2, episode 7a (2014)
- "Luck of the Half-Irish", Sullivan & Son season 3, episode 5 (2014)
- "Luck of the Pug-ish", Puppy Dog Pals season 1, episode 22b (2018)
