= Luck of the Draw =

Luck of the Draw may refer to:

== Film and television ==
=== Films ===
- The Gambler Returns: The Luck of the Draw, a 1991 television film; the fourth installment in the Gambler film series
- Luck of the Draw, a 2000 film featuring Andy Milder

=== Television episodes ===
- "Luck of the Draw", 24 Hours in A&E series 5, episode 3 (2014)
- "Luck of the Draw", All Saints season 7, episode 22 (2004)
- "Luck of the Draw", Blue Heelers season 1, episode 44 (1994)
- "Luck of the Draw", Carson's Law episode 129 (1984)
- "Luck of the Draw", Cuffs episode 1 (2015)
- "Luck of the Draw", Dr. Quinn, Medicine Woman season 2, episode 18 (1994)
- "Luck of the Draw", ER season 1, episode 13 (1995)
- "Luck of the Draw", Pawn Stars season 3, episode 17 (2011)
- "Luck of the Draw", Sliders season 1, episode 10 (1995)
- "Luck of the Draw", The Biggest Loser Asia season 2, episode 10 (2010)
- "Luck of the Draw", The Bill series 5, episode 27 (1989)
- "Luck of the Draw", The Bill series 20, episode 60 (2004)
- "Luck of the Draw", The Flying Doctors series 6, episode 49 (1992)
- "Luck of the Draw", Tokyo Pig episode 14 (1997)
- "Luck of the Draw", Zeke's Pad episode 24 (2009)

== Literature ==
- Luck of the Draw, a 2004 novel by Carolina Garcia-Aguilera
- Luck of the Draw (novel), a 2012 novel by Piers Anthony; the 36th installment in the Xanth series

== Other uses ==
- Luck of the Draw (album), by Bonnie Raitt
- Luck of the Draw (board game), a drawing game

== See also ==
- Bad luck
- Good luck (disambiguation)
- Irish Luck
- Luck of the Irish (disambiguation)
