= Umberto Rapetto =

Italian writer and journalist

- Born: 19 August 1959; Acqui Terme, Italy
- Military career
- Branch: Guardia di Finanza
- Service years: 1908–1958
- Rank: Brigade general
- Unit: Gruppo Anticrimine Tecnologico
- Commands: Gruppo Anticrimine Tecnologico

Umberto Rapetto (born in Acqui Terme on 19 August 1959) is an Italian general of the Guardia di Finanza, on leave since 2012, and former commander of the Online Fraud Special Group.

In Telecom Italia after being strategic advisor to the executive chairman, Franco Bernabè, and then - as group senior vice president - director of initiatives and special projects, he left at the end of 2013 in disagreement with the choices of the new top management.

From 2013 to 2015 he hosted the RAI TV show Il Verificatore and in February 2020 he founded the magazine Infosec.news, of which he is the editorial director.

== Biography ==
A former cadet of Nunziatella Military School, as Head of the Technological Crime Group, that he founded and led, in 2001 he directed the investigations that led to the definitive conviction of computer crackers involved in web attacks against the Pentagon and NASA, as well as those delegated by the Italian Court of Audit on the scandal of slot machines not connected to the tax registry, an investigation that led to the conviction of the heads of the State Monopolies and the concessionary companies to pay 2.5 billion euros.

On May 29, 2012, following his removal from office, he resigned from the Guardia di Finanza. His removal is the subject of nine parliamentary pleas.

As an advisor to Marco Pantani's family, he testified on April 16, 2019 before the Anti-Mafia Parliamentary Commission.

== Activity ==
=== University lecturing ===
He has carried out university teaching activities in several universities, including the University of Rome Tor Vergata, Pisa, Calabria, Roma Tre, Trento, Chieti/Pescara, Cattolica del Sacro Cuore in Piacenza, Teramo, Link Campus University, "LUM - Jean Monnet" in Bari, Parma, Palermo, Macerata, La Sapienza in Rome.

=== Teaching ===
Speaker and chairman in national and international conferences on economic and technological crime, in the institutional field he teaches and has taught at the Training Schools of intelligence structures, the Directorate of Electronic and Computer Courses of the Defense Staff, the Italian War School, the Center for Advanced Defense Studies, the Higher Institute of Interforce Major States ISSMI, the Technical School of the Italian State Police, the Higher Institute of Police and many other schools and training institutions for state officers.

He has lectured in several academic institutions including the School of Specialization in Law and Economics of the EC University La Sapienza of Rome, the School of Management of LUISS ("Risk & crisis management"), the Faculty of Engineering of the University La Sapienza of Rome, the Faculty of Architecture "Valle Giulia" of the University La Sapienza of Rome, the Faculty of Political Science "Cesare Alfieri" of the University of Florence.

=== Publishing activity ===
Member since 1990 to the Italian Order of Journalists, has written over two thousand articles on the pages of major national newspapers. He has collaborated with the newspapers Il Messaggero, Italia Oggi, MF Milano Finanza, Il Giornale, L'Indipendente, Il Giorno, La Nazione, Il Resto del Carlino. La Gazzetta del Sud, Affari&Finanza of La Repubblica, Avvenire, La Padania, La Stampa, with the monthlies Capital, Avvenimenti, Newton and Max. He held for two years a weekly column on the cultural pages of Il manifesto.

He collaborates with newspapers Il Secolo XIX and Il Sole 24 Ore, weekly newspapers Corriere della Sera SETTE and Panorama, and he has a column on Oggi. In December 2012 he started a personal blog on Il Fatto Quotidiano.

== Books ==
- Essays:
  - Rapetto, Umberto (1997). CYBERWAR, la guerra dell'informazione. Roma: Buffetti.
  - Rapetto, Umberto (2001). LE NUOVE GUERRE - Dalla Cyberwar ai Black Bloc, dal sabotaggio mediatico a Bin Laden. Milano: BUR Biblioteca Universale Rizzoli. ISBN 88-17-12831-7.
  - Rapetto, Umberto (2002). L'ATLANTE DELLE SPIE. Milano: BUR Biblioteca Universale Rizzoli. ISBN 88-17-12940-2.
  - Rapetto, Umberto (2003). ATTACCO ALL'IRAQ, 100 ragioni segrete, incredibili, ovvie. Milano: BUR Biblioteca Universale Rizzoli. ISBN 88-17-10732-8.
- Informatics and organization:
  - Rapetto, Umberto (1990). CRIMINALITÀ INFORMATICA ED ECONOMICA. Roma: Buffetti Editore.
  - Rapetto, Umberto (1990). IL TUO COMPUTER È NEL MIRINO. Milano: Editrice Il Crogiolo.
  - Rapetto, Umberto (1991). I SISTEMI OPERATIVI DEL PERSONAL COMPUTER. Milano: Pirola Editore (Gruppo Editoriale Il Sole 24 ORE).
  - Rapetto, Umberto (1992). COME ORGANIZZARE UN ARCHIVIO ELETTRONICO. Milano: Pirola Editore (Gruppo Editoriale Il Sole 24 ORE).
  - Rapetto, Umberto (1992). I Database. Milano: Pirola Editore (Gruppo Editoriale Il Sole 24 ORE).
  - Rapetto, Umberto (1993). INTRODUZIONE AL DESKTOP PUBLISHING. Milano: Pirola Editore (Gruppo Editoriale Il Sole 24 ORE).
  - Rapetto, Umberto (1994). SCRIVERE CON IL PERSONAL COMPUTER. Roma: EPC Editoria Professionale. ISBN 88-85847-93-5.
  - Rapetto, Umberto (1994). IL MAGAZZINO CHE FUNZIONA. Roma: EPC Editoria Professionale. ISBN 88-85847-66-8.
  - Rapetto, Umberto (1994). TUTTE LE BANCHE DATI, Come scegliere, come collegarsi. Roma: EPC Editoria Professionale. ISBN 88-85847-84-6.
  - Rapetto, Umberto (1994). INFORMATICA FACILE PER CHI COMINCIA. Roma: EPC Editoria Professionale. ISBN 88-85847-75-7.
  - Rapetto, Umberto (1994). CHECK-LIST INFORMATICA. Roma: EPC Editoria Professionale.
- Law and taxes:
  - Rapetto, Umberto (1991). SCRITTURE CONTABILI E FISCO. Milano: Il Sole 24 ORE / Professione Impresa.
  - Rapetto, Umberto (1991). COME RECUPERARE I CREDITI. Milano: Il Sole 24 ORE / Professione Impresa.
  - Rapetto, Umberto (1992). FRINGE BENEFITS. Milano: Pirola Editore (Gruppo Editoriale Il Sole 24 ORE).
  - Rapetto, Umberto (1993). OBBLIGHI FISCALI E CONTABILITÀ. Milano: Pirola Editore (Gruppo Editoriale Il Sole 24 ORE).
  - Rapetto, Umberto (1993). GUIDA AL NUOVO CONTENZIOSO TRIBUTARIO. Milano: Pirola Editore (Gruppo Editoriale Il Sole 24 ORE).
  - Rapetto, Umberto (1993). 740 SENZA PROBLEMI. Milano: Pirola Editore (Gruppo Editoriale Il Sole 24 ORE).
  - Rapetto, Umberto (1993). ICI - NUOVA IMPOSTA COMUNALE SUGLI IMMOBILI. Milano: Pirola Editore (Gruppo Editoriale Il Sole 24 ORE).
  - Rapetto, Umberto (1994). FISCO NOVITÀ 1994. Rimini: Maggioli Editore.
  - Rapetto, Umberto (1994). CODICE TRIBUTARIO ESSENZIALE. Rimini: Maggioli Editore.
  - Rapetto, Umberto (1994). CHECK-UP FISCALE PER L'AZIENDA E IL PROFESSIONISTA. Roma: EPC Editoria Professionale. ISBN 88-85847-67-6.
  - Rapetto, Umberto (1994). FISCO NOVITÀ - APRILE 1994. Rimini: Maggioli Editore.
  - Rapetto, Umberto (1994). IL RECUPERO DEI CREDITI IN AZIENDA. Roma: EPC Editoria Professionale.
  - Rapetto, Umberto (1994). FARE RICORSO CONTRO IL FISCO. Roma: EPC Editoria Professionale.
  - Rapetto, Umberto (1994). TENERE CORRETTAMENTE SCRITTURE CONTABILI E FISCALI. Roma: EPC Editoria Professionale.
  - Rapetto, Umberto (1994). CASA & FISCO - LA DISCIPLINA TRIBUTARIA DEGLI IMMOBILI. Rimini: Maggioli Editore.
  - Rapetto, Umberto (1994). GUIDA PRATICA AL PATTEGGIAMENTO FISCALE. Rimini: Maggioli Editore.
  - Rapetto, Umberto (1994). INDENNITÀ E FRINGE BENEFITS. Roma: EPC Editoria Professionale.
  - Rapetto, Umberto (1994). NUOVE REGOLE PER IL PATTEGGIAMENTO FISCALE. Rimini: Maggioli Editore.
  - Rapetto, Umberto (1995). CONCORDATO TRIBUTARIO E RAVVEDIMENTO OPEROSO. Roma: EPC Editoria Professionale.
  - Rapetto, Umberto (1995). 740 E ICI - LE DICHIARAZIONI 1995 RIGO PER RIGO. Roma: EPC Editoria Professionale. ISBN 88-8184-019-7.
  - Rapetto, Umberto (1995). 740 E ICI ILLUSTRATI. Roma: EPC Editoria Professionale. ISBN 88-8184-018-9.
  - Rapetto, Umberto (1996). FINANZIARIA 1996 E NOVITÀ FISCALI. Roma: Buffetti Editore. ISBN 88-8184-033-2.
  - Rapetto, Umberto (1996). IL CONTRIBUTO DEL 10% PER COLLABORATORI E LAVORATORI NON SUBORDINATI. Roma: Buffetti Editore.
  - Rapetto, Umberto (1996). IL 10% PREVIDENZIALE PER AMMINISTRATORI, SINDACI E REVISORI DI SOCIETÀ. Roma: Buffetti Editore.
  - Rapetto, Umberto (1997). LA TUTELA DEI DATI PERSONALI. Roma: EPC Editoria Professionale.
  - Rapetto, Umberto (1997). CODICE DELL'USURA. Roma: Buffetti Editore.
  - Rapetto, Umberto (1998). PRIVACY: IL MANUALE OPERATIVO. Roma: EPC Libri. ISBN 88-8184-076-6.
  - Rapetto, Umberto (2003). MUSICA & COPYRIGHT, Copiare, registrare, fare download e masterizzare senza problemi e sanzioni. Roma: EPC Libri. ISBN 88-8184-293-9.
  - Rapetto, Umberto (2003). PRIVACY IN PRATICA, Tutte le cautele punto per punto per proteggere i dati personali. Roma: EPC Libri. ISBN 88-8184-306-4.
  - Rapetto, Umberto (2004). DOCUMENTO PROGRAMMATICO SULLA SICUREZZA, guida alla compilazione. Roma: EPC Libri. ISBN 88-8184-362-5.
  - Rapetto, Umberto (2008). NOVITÀ LEGISLATIVE IN MATERIA DI CRIMINE INFORMATICO. Roma: EPC Libri. ISBN 978-88-6310-033-4.
- Costume and society
  - Rapetto, Umberto (1996). SPIATI? SCOPRITE SE È VERO. Roma: EPC Editoria Professionale. ISBN 88-8184-039-1.
  - Rapetto, Umberto (1997). GENITORI, OCCHIO A INTERNET!. Roma: EPC Editoria Professionale. ISBN 88-8184-039-1.
  - Rapetto, Umberto (2006). TRUFFE.COM. Milano: Cairo Editore. ISBN 88-6052-035-5.
- Divertissement
  - Rapetto, Umberto (1991). MANAGEMENT CONFUSIONALE. Milano: Editrice Il Crogiolo.
  - Rapetto, Umberto (1993). LORO DI NAPOLI. Roma: EPC Editoria Professionale. ISBN 88-85847-63-3.
  - Rapetto, Umberto (1994). IN UNA NOTTE DI PEDILUVIO. Milano: Editrice Il Crogiolo.

== Awards ==

Commendatore dell'Ordine al Merito della Repubblica Italiana
