= Radio Classica =

Italy
- Broadcast area: Italy - National FM, Satellite and Internet
- Frequencies: FM several frequencies, change from geographical side to side HB 8 13°E: 11623 / 27500 / 3/4 V

Programming
- Format: Classical Music, Business talk

Ownership
- Owner: Class Editori

History
- First air date: April 2001

Links
- Webcast: Windows Media
- Website: http://www.radioclassica.fm/

Radio Classica is an Italian radio station operated by Italian publishing company Class Editori, specialising in Classical music. Programming include news and financial reports in collaboration with Class News and Class CNBC.

Radio Classica is broadcast locally in the cities of Milan, Como, Lecco and other areas of Lombardy.
