= Tough luck =

Tough luck may refer to:

- Bad or undesirable luck or fortune

== Music ==
- "Tough Luck" (song), by Laufey, 2025
- "Tough Luck", a song by Caesars from Strawberry Weed, 2008
- "Tough Luck", a song by Nina Nesbitt from Peroxide, 2014

== Television ==
- "Tough Luck" (Ben 10), a 2006 episode
- "Tough Luck" (Jackie Chan Adventures), a 2002 episode
- "Tough Luck" (Supa Strikas), a 2011 episode

== See also ==
- Bad luck (disambiguation)
- Misfortune (disambiguation)
- Good luck (disambiguation)
