= MF =

MF or mf may refer to:

== Biology ==
- Mossy fiber (disambiguation), in neuroscience
- Mycosis fungoides, a type of skin disease
- Myelofibrosis, a chronic clonal malignant disease
- Methuselah Foundation, a non-profit volunteer organization devoted to anti-aging research
- Microfibril rosettes, the sites of cellulose microfibril synthesis in plants

== Agriculture and transportation ==
- Milk fat, on dairy product labels in Canada
- Master of forestry
- Massey Ferguson, an agricultural equipment company
- Mitsubishi Fuso Truck and Bus Corporation, a Japanese manufacturer of trucks and buses
  - Mitsubishi Fuso Truck of America, Inc., a North American subsidiary
- Xiamen Airlines (IATA airline designator MF)
- MF or M/F, ship prefix for a motor ferry
- The prefix for steel-wheel rolling stock on the Paris Metro
- Mandatory frequency airport, a non-towered airport that requires aircraft to communicate on a published frequency

== Computing and telecommunications ==
- Mainframe computer
- MediaFire, a file hosting, file synchronization, and cloud storage service
- Metafont, a font-definition programming language
- Mozilla Firefox, a web browser
- Micro Focus, a software company
- .mf, Internet top level domain for Saint Martin
- Multi-frequency, in telephony
- Medium frequency, radio transmissions between the frequencies of 300 kHz and 3000 kHz

== Electronics ==
- Megafarad (MF), an SI unit of electric capacitance
- Millifarad (mF), an SI unit of electric capacitance

== Photography ==
- Manual focus
- Medium format (film), a size of camera

== Arts, entertainment, and media ==
=== Music ===
==== Musicians ====
- Maynard Ferguson (1928–2006), trumpeter and bandleader
- MF Doom (Daniel Dumile, 1971-2020), British-born hip hop recording artist
- MF Grimm (born 1970), hip-hop artist
- Mylène Farmer (born 1961), Canadian-born French singer and songwriter

==== Other uses in music ====
- Mezzo forte (musical notation), a dynamic marking
- Melodifestivalen, the Swedish preselection for the Eurovision Song Contest
- Musical Fidelity, a British high-end audio equipment manufacturer

=== Television ===
- Making Fiends (TV series), an American animated horror comedy
- Modern Family, an American sitcom
- Monster Force, a 1994 animated television series
- "Murder Family", the 2020 premiere episode of Helluva Boss

=== Video games ===
- Metroid Fusion

=== Literature ===
- M/F, a novel by Anthony Burgess
- m/f: a feminist journal, a British feminist magazine
- MF Dow Jones News, an Italian financial news agency
- MF Milano Finanza, an Italian business newspaper
- Mladá fronta DNES, a Czech newspaper

== Places ==
- MF, the country code for Saint Martin
- Mayotte, France (FIPS PUB 10-4 territory code MF)

== Finance ==
- MF Global (also Man Financial), a former finance company NYSE listed as MF
- Mutual fund, in finance

== Religious institutions ==
- MF Norwegian School of Theology, Religion and Society
- Muslims of France, a religious organization in France

== Politics ==
- Minority Front, a South African political party
- Member of the Folketing

== Other uses ==
- Monday–Friday (M–F), abbreviation for the American workweek
- Membership function, in control engineering, in fuzzy sets
- Midfielder, a playing position in association football
- Motherfucker, an insult

== See also ==
- Miss Fortune (disambiguation)
- My Friend (disambiguation)
