= Lavagnino =

Lavagnino is an Italian surname. Notable people with the surname include:

- Angelo Francesco Lavagnino (1909–1987), Italian classical composer
- Sam Lavagnino (born 2006), American voice actor and YouTuber
