= Misfortune =

Misfortune or Misfortunes may refer to:

- Bad luck

== Books ==
- Misfortune (folk tale) (Italian: "Sfortuna"), an Italian fairy tale collected by Italo Calvino in his Italian Folktales
- Misfortune (novel), a 2005 novel by Wesley Stace
- A Misfortune, sometimes translated "Misfortune", an 1886 short story by Anton Chekhov
- Misfortunes, a 1930 poetry collection poems by Rose Macaulay

== Music ==
=== Albums ===
- Misfortunes (album), a 2008 album by This Is Hell

=== Songs ===
- "Misfortune", a 1984 song by SNFU from ...And No One Else Wanted to Play
- "Misfortune", a 1989 song by Goo Goo Dolls from Jed (song)
- "Misfortunes", a 1992 song by And Also the Trees from Farewell to the Shade

== See also ==
- The Misfortunes of Arthur, play 1587
- The Misfortunes of Alonso Ramírez 1690
- The Misfortunes of Elphin, by Thomas Love Peacock 1829
- Bad luck (disambiguation)
- Fortune (disambiguation)
- Miss Fortune (disambiguation)
- Yaku: Yūjō Dangi, a 1996 video game transliterated as "Misfortune: Doubts About Friendship"
