= List of Puppy Dog Pals episodes =

The following is a list of episodes from the Disney Junior series Puppy Dog Pals.

== Series overview ==
Season	Segments	Episodes	Originally released	
Season	Segments	Episodes	First released	Last released
1	50	25	April 14, 2017	July 27, 2018
2	60	30	October 12, 2018	October 14, 2019
3	50	25	November 8, 2019	October 15, 2020
4	32	16	October 23, 2020	November 19, 2021
5	40	20	January 14, 2022	January 20, 2023

== Episodes ==
=== Season 1 (2017–18) ===
No. overall	No. in season	Title	Directed by	Written by	Storyboard by	Original release date	Prod. code	US viewers (millions)
1a	1a	"Hawaii Pug-Oh"	Scott Bern	Harland Williams	Paul Cohen	April 14, 2017	101	1.39
When Bob says he'd love to feel the sand on his toes, Bingo and Rolly go on a mission to Hawaii.
1b	1b	"A.R.F."	Trevor Wall	Bob Smiley	James Gibson	April 14, 2017	101	1.39
Bob introduces the pups to A.R.F., a robotic dog that is programmed to clean up their messes.
2a	2a	"The French Toast Connection"	Stephanie Arnett	Brendan Duffy	Kris Wimberly	April 14, 2017	102	1.36
Bingo and Rolly travel to France to get Bob some bread for his French toast.
2b	2b	"Take Me Out to the Pug Game"	Scott Bern	Sean Coyle	Doris Umschaden	April 14, 2017	102	1.36
Bingo and Rolly chase Bob's prized baseball across the city.
3a	3a	"The Go-Long Retriever"	Stephanie Arnett	Jessica Carleton	Kris Wimberly	April 21, 2017	105	0.99
Bingo and Rolly try to get away from a self-fetching stick that begins chasing them.
3b	3b	"Pot O' Pugs"	Scott Bern	Bob Smiley	Doris Umschaden	April 21, 2017	105	0.99
After Bob says Bingo and Rolly needs a pot of gold, the pups search for one at the end of a rainbow.
4a	4a	"A Pyramid Scheme"	Trevor Wall	Jeff Rothpan	Julia Briemle	April 21, 2017	103	1.05
Bingo and Rolly travel to Egypt to find the missing Great Pyramids.
4b	4b	"Special Delivery"	Stephanie Arnett	Bob Smiley	Otis Brayboy	April 21, 2017	103	1.05
Bingo and Rolly try to deliver a Mother's Day card for Bob.
5a	5a	"Design-A-Dog"	Scott Bern	Jessica Carleton	Paul Cohen	April 28, 2017	104	0.91
Bingo and Rolly accidentally chew Bob's childhood toy.
5b	5b	"Ice, Ice Puggy"	Trevor Wall	Darrin Rose	James Gibson	April 28, 2017	104	0.91
When Bob runs out of ice, Bingo and Rolly go to Antarctica to get him some.
6a	6a	"Free Whaley"	Trevor Wall	Sean Tweedley	Julia Briemle	May 5, 2017	109	1.05
Bingo and Rolly help a baby whale that has been separated from her family.
6b	6b	"Putting It Together"	Stephanie Arnett	Brendan Duffy	Otis Brayboy	May 5, 2017	109	1.05
Bingo and Rolly retrace their steps to remember where they buried Bob's unicycle.
7a	7a	"Hissy's Big Day"	Trevor Wall	Bill Fuller	Julia Briemle	May 12, 2017	106	1.05
After Hissy has had a bad morning, Bingo and Rolly try to make her feel better by taking her to their favorite places.
7b	7b	"Go, Dog. Go!"	Stephanie Arnett	Bob Smiley	Otis Brayboy	May 12, 2017	106	1.05
The reprogrammed A.R.F. takes Bingo and Rolly where they want to go, but A.R.F. soon forgets the way back after A.R.F. short-circuits due to water.
8a	8a	"Pigs and Pugs"	Trevor Wall	Jessica Carleton	Bill Breneisen and Alfred Gimeno	May 19, 2017	107	1.04
Bob mistakes a mud-covered pig for Rolly and accidentally leaves him behind on the farm.
8b	8b	"Bob Loves Mona"	Scott Bern	S : Joe Ansolabehere; T : Jessica Carleton	Rudi Bloss	May 19, 2017	107	1.04
Bingo and Rolly travel to the Great Wall of China to search for the missing Mona Lisa.
9a	9a	"Don't Rain on my Pug-rade"	Trevor Wall	Bob Smiley	Arthur Valencia	June 16, 2017	112	1.59
When Bob cannot leave his house to watch a parade, the pups enlist a family of ducks to march past the house.
9b	9b	"Their Royal Pug-ness"	Stephanie Arnett	Bob Smiley	Otis Brayboy	June 16, 2017	112	1.59
Bingo and Rolly head to England to learn how to treat a queen.
10a	10a	"Scuba-Doggies"	Scott Bern	S : Jessica Carleton; T : Bob Smiley	Rudi Bloss	June 23, 2017	113	1.25
The pups go to the Great Barrier Reef to find Bob's package that was lost at sea.
10b	10b	"Walking the Bob"	Trevor Wall	Bob Smiley	Bill Breneisen	June 23, 2017	113	1.25
The pups lead a blurry-visioned Bob home.
11a	11a	"Hissy's Kitty"	Stephanie Arnett	Jessica Carleton	Kris Wimberly	July 7, 2017	114	1.21
When Bob brings home a lost kitty, Hissy looks after it while Bingo and Rolly try to find her a home.
11b	11b	"Polly Wants a Pug"	Scott Bern	Michael Olson and Bob Smiley	Julia Briemle and Doris Umschaden	July 7, 2017	114	1.21
While in Florida, Bingo and Rolly search for an old friend of a homesick Bob's.
12a	12a	"Leave it to Beavers"	Trevor Wall	Jessica Carleton	Julia Briemle	July 14, 2017	115	1.35
Bingo and Rolly try to build a dam to protect their doghouse from a rainstorm.
12b	12b	"Counting Sheep"	Stephanie Arnett	Jessica Carleton	Otis Brayboy	July 14, 2017	115	1.35
When Bob says Bingo and Rolly will count sheep to sleep, Bingo and Rolly herd a flock of sheep into the backyard to help.
13a	13a	"Captain Rolly"	Scott Bern	Brian Hall	Rudi Bloss	July 28, 2017	116	1.20
Bingo and Rolly attend the Captain Dog fan party.
13b	13b	"The Coolest Dogs in Town"	Trevor Wall	Brian Hall	Bill Breneisen	July 28, 2017	116	1.20
A.R.F. takes Bingo and Rolly places to get cool.
14a	14a	"Puzzling Pugs"	Stephanie Arnett	T : Michael Olson; S/T : Harland Williams	Ashley Lenz	August 11, 2017	117	1.25
Bingo, Rolly and Hissy find a leopard for Bob's puzzle after A.R.F. tears up the box accidentally.
14b	14b	"Rhapsody in Pug"	Scott Bern	Amy Van Curen	Doris Umschaden	August 11, 2017	117	1.25
Bingo and Rolly go to a concert.
15a	15a	"The Legend of Ol' Snapper"	Trevor Wall	Sean Coyle	Julia Briemle	August 25, 2017	118	0.84
Bob's fishing pole is stolen by a legendary creature.
15b	15b	"Adventures in Puppy-Sitting"	Stephanie Arnett	Jessica Carleton	Otis Brayboy	August 25, 2017	118	0.84
Bingo and Rolly are tasked to babysit Baby, a big dog that causes trouble around the town.
16a	16a	"Bye Bye, Butterfly"	Trevor Wall	Jessica Carleton and Harland Williams	Ed Baker	September 22, 2017	110	0.63
Bingo and Rolly help a butterfly find a way back to her family.
16b	16b	"A Seat at the Theatre"	Scott Bern	Jessica Carleton	Rudi Bloss	September 22, 2017	110	0.63
Bingo and Rolly try to take a seat to Bob's favorite play and try not to wake up Hissy at the same time.
17a	17a	"Return to the Pumpkin Patch"	Scott Bern	S : Bob Smiley; T : Amy Van Curen	Doris Umschaden	October 1, 2017	123	0.97
Bingo, Rolly and Hissy go to a pumpkin patch to find Bingo's collar after Bingo loses it in the maze.
17b	17b	"Haunted Howl-oween"	Stephanie Arnett	S : Amy Van Curen; T : Jessica Carleton	Ashley Lenz	October 1, 2017	123	0.97
Bingo and Rolly go on a mission to find Chloe's Halloween costume.
18a	18a	"Close Encounters of a Pug Kind"	Trevor Wall	Brian Hall	Bill Breneisen	October 13, 2017	121	0.84
The pups go to a gathering of UFO enthusiasts to find someone from space and mistake a lost chameleon for an alien.
18b	18b	"History Mystery"	Stephanie Arnett	Amy Van Curen	Otis Brayboy	October 13, 2017	121	0.84
When the pups find a doggie toy that is not theirs, they go on a mission to find its original owner.
19a	19a	"Art for Pug's Sake"	Stephanie Arnett	Bob Smiley	Kris Wimberly	November 10, 2017	108	0.94
Bingo and Rolly try to hang something of Bob's at a famous Italian art museum.
19b	19b	"Winter Wonderpug"	Scott Bern	Bob Smiley	Doris Umschaden	November 10, 2017	108	0.94
Bingo and Rolly look for the first snowflake of the season while helping other animals prepare for winter.
20a	20a	"A Very Pug Christmas"	Scott Bern	S : Jessica Carleton; S/T : Brian Hall	Roger Dondis	December 1, 2017	125	1.03
On Christmas Eve, Bingo and Rolly help Santa search for Bob's Christmas present when it goes missing in the sleigh.
20b	20b	"The Latke Kerfuffle"	Trevor Wall	Jessica Carleton	Bill Breneisen	December 1, 2017	125	1.03
Bingo and Rolly help Bob make latkes for their neighbor Chloe's Hanukkah party by getting the ingredients.
21a	21a	"Puggy-ology"	Scott Bern	Jessica Carleton	Rudi Bloss	February 23, 2018	119	0.72
Bingo and Rolly help Bob's younger sister, Bonnie, look for two missing historical items so Bonnie can go to the baseball game with Bob.
21b	21b	"Squirrels Just Wanna Have Fun"	Trevor Wall	Jean Ansolabehere	Bill Breneisen	February 23, 2018	119	0.72
Bingo and Rolly try to catch a squirrel who's been making noises in their house.
22a	22a	"The Great Pug-scape"	Stephanie Arnett	Amy Van Curen	Kris Wimberly	March 9, 2018	111	0.71
After Hissy gets a time out, Bingo and Rolly try to break her out of her punishment, when in reality, Hissy was getting some time to relax.
22b	22b	"Luck of the Pug-ish"	Scott Bern	Sean Coyle	Kelly James	March 16, 2018	111	0.76
Bingo and Rolly travel to Ireland in search of a four-leaf clover to bring Bob good luck.
23a	23a	"The Great Shirt Rescue"	Scott Bern	Jean Ansolabehere	Rudi Bloss	March 23, 2018	122	0.84
When Bob loses his lucky shirt, Bingo and Rolly enlist their friend Jackie to help stage a heist to get it back.
23b	23b	"A Pugtastic Day with Grandma"	Trevor Wall	S : Bill Fuller; T : Michael Olson	Carole Holliday	March 30, 2018	122	0.89
Bingo and Rolly stay with Bob's mom while Bob goes out of town while trying not to tire her out for a concert.
24a	24a	"Bob's Boomerang"	Trevor Wall	Jeff Rothpan	Julia Briemle	July 6, 2018	124	0.56
After Rolly chews up Bob's prized boomerang, Bingo and Rolly head to Australia to find a new one.
24b	24b	"Fetch That Fish"	Stephanie Arnett	Travis Braun	Otis Brayboy	July 13, 2018	124	N/A
When Bob brings home a pet fish named Olivia, the puppies try to play puppy games with it.
25a	25a	"Bingo & Rolly's Birthday"	Stephanie Arnett	Jessica Carleton	Ashley Lenz	July 20, 2018	120	N/A
It's the Pups' birthday.
25b	25b	"Electric Pugaloo"	Scott Bern	Jean Ansolabehere	Doris Umschaden	July 27, 2018	120	N/A
When Bob needs to learn how to dance, Bingo and Rolly enlist the help of an animal friend named Hedgie.

=== Season 2 (2018–19) ===
NOTE: Beginning with this season, the episode titles have now been discontinued. They usually rather cut to the actual episode, with the titles still being really heard.

No. overall	No. in season	Title	Directed by	Written by	Storyboard by	Original release date	Prod. code	US viewers (millions)
26a	1a	"A New Pup in Town"	Bill Breneisen	Jessica Carleton	Arthur Valencia	October 12, 2018	201	0.68
Bingo and Rolly make a new friend named Keia who has just moved in next door.
26b	1b	"The Last Pup-icorn"	Scott Bern	Jean Ansolabehere	Fred Cline	October 12, 2018	201	0.68
Bingo and Rolly go on a mission with Keia to find a unicorn for Chloe.
27a	2a	"Keia's New Doghouse"	Scott Bern	S : Jessica Carleton; T : Brian Hall	Latoya Raveneau	October 19, 2018	202	0.69
Bingo and Rolly want Keia to throw a party in her doghouse so Keia can make new friends. Note: Hissy makes a cameo appearance in this episode.
27b	2b	"The Fang Fairy"	Trevor Wall	Jessica Carleton	Misty Marsden	October 19, 2018	202	0.69
Rolly loses his first puppy tooth and can't wait for a visit from the Fang fairy.
28a	3a	"Land of the Rising Pups"	Bill Breneisen	Brian Hall	Fred Cline	October 26, 2018	204	0.61
The pups look for Snow Monkey in Japan to send snow to Bob.
28b	3b	"ARF-choo!"	Scott Bern	Jean Ansolabehere	Arthur Valencia	October 26, 2018	204	0.61
After breaking down due to Bingo, Rolly, and Keia interrupting a reboot, A.R.F. ends up in a sick state and has to stay home while Keia, Bingo, and Rolly go to make a new fuse for him before Bob takes him for a demonstration.
29a	4a	"One Small Ruff for Pup-kind"	Spencer Laudiero	Jean Ansolabehere	Kelly James	November 2, 2018	205	0.53
Chloe accidentally leaves Ruff-Ruff behind her way to astronaut summer camp, leaving it up to Keia, A.R.F., Bingo, and Rolly to get him back in her bag before bedtime. They also gain the help of robot-dog Rover and his help is needed after an accidental trip to the moon leaves A.R.F. in disrepair.
29b	4b	"The Lost Bouncy Ball"	Bill Breneisen	Brian Hall	Misty Marsden	November 2, 2018	205	0.53
Bingo and Rolly enlist their friends on a ball search.
30a	5a	"The Total Yodel"	Scott Bern	Jessica Carleton	Chris Harmon and Chris Jammal	November 9, 2018	206	0.63
Bingo and Rolly go to the Alps for yodeling lessons, so they can pass them down to Bob.
30b	5b	"Bob's Birthday Wish"	Spencer Laudiero	Jean Ansolabehere	Latoya Raveneau	November 9, 2018	206	0.63
It is Bob's birthday and Bingo and Rolly are out to find his surprise out. Meanwhile, Rolly has the hiccups.
31a	6a	"Operation: Dinner"	Scott Bern	Jessica Carleton	Fred Cline	November 16, 2018	207	0.56
Bob left his dinner at his house before going to work, so the pups go on a mission to give it to him.
31b	6b	"The Case of the Missing Caterpillar"	Bill Breneisen	Jessica Carleton	Arthur Valencia	November 16, 2018	207	0.56
After Keia befriends a caterpillar in the park, Keia takes it home with her and enlists Bingo and Rolly to help search when disappears.
32a	7a	"A Santa for Bob"	Stephanie Arnett	Rick Suvalle	Doris Umschaden	November 30, 2018	212	0.57
The pups head to Santa's workshop to have the real Santa for Bob's party when a stand-in is unable to attend. Unfortunately, the pups get lost on their way north and the real deal is stuck in bed with a cold.
32b	7b	"Snowman Secret Service"	Bill Breneisen	Brian Hall	Latoya Raveneau	November 30, 2018	212	0.57
Keia, Bingo, and Rolly take it up to themselves to keep Bob's snowman Sir Brrr from melting.
33a	8a	"Lemur Play"	Spencer Laudiero	Amy Van Curen	Misty Marsden	January 18, 2019	208	0.54
Bingo and Rolly head to the land of Lemurs so they can get a group away from Bonnie's dig site.
33b	8b	"How the Dog Park Was Won"	Bill Breneisen	Jean Ansolabehere	Melanie Joe	January 18, 2019	208	0.54
All the puppies in the park must stand against a mean, toy-stealing dog named Zeus.
34a	9a	"Windy City"	Scott Bern	S : Jessica Carleton; T : Brian Hall	Latoya Raveneau	January 25, 2019	209	0.56
Bingo and Rolly head to Chicago to try to bring a gust from the windy city for Bob's kite.
34b	9b	"Sham-pooch"	Stephanie Arnett	Jessica Carleton	Brandon Kruse	January 25, 2019	209	0.56
Keia gets nervous about her first time at the groomers, so the gang help her prepare for the trip. Unfortunately, some paint ends up breaking their chances when Keia turns purple.
35a	10a	"Valentine Surprise"	Bill Breneisen	Brian Hall	Misty Marsden	February 1, 2019	217	0.56
The pups go on a mission to find the perfect Valentine's Day gift for Bob and Chloe.
35b	10b	"Bright Lights, Pup City"	Scott Bern	Du Kirpalani	Melanie Joe and Spencer Laudiero	February 1, 2019	217	0.56
Bingo and Rolly try to restore the computer controlling Hong Kong's symphony of lights.
36a	11a	"Dinner Thief on the Puppytown Express"	Trevor Wall and Sean Coyle	Sean Coyle	Arthur Valencia	February 8, 2019	210	0.54
The dinners on a pet-friendly train disappear and everyone is a suspect.
36b	11b	"O' Brother, Where ARF Thou?"	Scott Bern	Jean Ansolabehere	Fred Cline	February 8, 2019	210	0.54
A.R.F. runs out of power retrieving a toy at a distant location and soon, Bob's pets head to the rescue.
37a	12a	"Duck, Duck, Dog"	Bill Breneisen	S : Jessica Carleton; T : Michael Olson	Kelly James	February 15, 2019	203	0.55
When Bingo and Rolly meet a duckling that behaves like a dog, they try everything they can to teach to act like a duck before the others migrate.
37b	12b	"Mr. Bob Goes to Washington"	Spencer Laudiero	Brian Hall	Chris Harmon	February 15, 2019	203	0.55
A piece of Bob's contest entry gets lost in traffic, leading Bingo and Rolly to retrieve it before time is up.
38a	13a	"Speedy as a Cheetah"	Bill Breneisen	Jessica Carleton	Melanie Joe	February 22, 2019	211	0.46
When Bob wishes the pugs could run fast, Bingo and Rolly find cheetahs to learn the secret of their speed.
38b	13b	"The Soup Search"	Stephanie Arnett	Jean Ansolabehere	Misty Marsden	February 22, 2019	211	0.46
Bingo and Rolly go on a mission to find the perfect bowl of soup to help a sick Bob feel better.
39a	14a	"Cousin Cody"	Scott Bern	Brian Hall	Fred Cline	March 22, 2019	213	0.41
Bob's cousins, Marty, Jennifer and Emma, come to visit at Bob's place. They even brought their pet beagle Cody, who left his toy at home, so Bingo and Rolly travel to get it.
39b	14b	"Hissy's Lost Toy"	Stephanie Arnett	Jessica Carleton	Arthur Valencia	March 22, 2019	213	0.41
When Hissy's favorite toy goes missing, the pups go on a mission to find it for their kitty sister.
40a	15a	"Keep on Food Truckin'"	Bill Breneisen	Jean Ansolabehere	Misty Marsden	March 29, 2019	214	0.54
Bob is looking to buy food from a mobile burger stand, but it does not come. Bingo and Rolly go on to look for it.
40b	15b	"Pupigan's Island"	Scott Bern	Jessica Carleton	Melanie Joe	March 29, 2019	214	0.54
Everyone gets stranded on a deserted island.
41a	16a	"What to Expect When You're Egg-specting"	Bill Breneisen	Jessica Carleton	Misty Marsden	April 5, 2019	223	0.54
While in New Zealand, Bingo, Rolly and Hissy try to return a large egg before it hatches.
41b	16b	"Ruffin' It"	Scott Bern	Brian Hall	Melanie Joe and Rory Smith	April 5, 2019	223	0.54
When Chloe and Keia lose a special canoe paddle, the pups embark on a wilderness adventure to find it.
42a	17a	"No Bones About It"	Stephanie Arnett	Jean Ansolabehere	Doris Umschaden	April 12, 2019	215	0.38
The pups team up with a roadrunner named Donna to find a bone for Bonnie's dinosaur.
42b	17b	"Bob's Sock Debacle"	Bill Breneisen	Brian Hall	Latoya Raveneau	April 12, 2019	215	0.38
While preparing for a golf tournament, Bob is suddenly missing one of his socks.
43a	18a	"Fantastic Pet Force"	Stephanie Arnett	Jean Ansolabehere	Doris Umschaden	April 19, 2019	218	N/A
Bingo, Rolly, Keia, and Hissy help Cupcake and Rufus find their missing bottle with a miniature galleon inside.
43b	18b	"Sea No Turtle"	Bill Breneisen	Jessica Carleton	Latoya Raveneau	April 19, 2019	218	N/A
Bingo and Rolly help a sea turtle find it way to the ocean.
44a	19a	"Wonder-Bob"	Scott Bern	Sean Coyle	Melanie Joe	May 17, 2019	220	N/A
The pups try to find a new baseball bat for Bob before his championship game starts.
44b	19b	"Yay, Earth Day!"	Bill Breneisen	Jessica Carleton	Misty Marsden	May 17, 2019	220	N/A
On Earth Day, Bingo and Rolly helped two lost moles find their way home.
45a	20a	"Father's Day Countdown"	Stephanie Arnett	Jean Ansolabehere	Brandon Kruse and Arthur Valencia	June 14, 2019	219	N/A
When Chloe's dad's flight is canceled on Father's Day, the gang go on an urgent mission to bring him home.
45b	20b	"20,000 Leagues Under the Lake"	Scott Bern	Brian Hall	Fred Cline	June 14, 2019	219	N/A
When Dash and Duke's favorite toy goes missing, Bingo, Rolly, and Keia search the lake to find it.
46a	21a	"Take Your Dog to Work Day"	Scott Bern	S : Jessica Carleton; T : Mercedes Valle	Fred Cline	June 21, 2019	228	N/A
The pup lose an important part of Bob's presentation during Take Your Dog to Work Day.
46b	21b	"Slumber Paw-ty"	Stephanie Arnett	Jessica Carleton	Brandon Kruse	June 21, 2019	228	N/A
Bob, Bingo, Rolly, and Keia run out of popcorn at their sleepover.
47a	22a	"The Bark Bowl"	Scott Bern	Stuart Friedel	Fred Cline	July 5, 2019	216	N/A
A team of pups take on a team of older dogs in a canine version of American football.
47b	22b	"When Hedgie Met Sallie"	Stephanie Arnett	Jean Ansolabehere	Arthur Valencia	July 5, 2019	216	N/A
Hedgie helps the pups catch the veggie beadit in Bob's vegetable patch.
48a	23a	"Adopt-a-Palooza"	Scott Bern	Jessica Carleton	Fred Cline	July 12, 2019	222	N/A
Bingo and Rolly help Lollie watch over a pack of younger puppies who are put up for adoption at a corral at a park.
48b	23b	"The Legend of Captain Wunderbark"	Stephanie Arnett	Jean Ansolabehere	Brandon Kruse	July 12, 2019	222	N/A
Bingo, Rolly and Keia go off in a search of Captain Wunderbuark's long ship.
49a	24a	"Double Doggie Dare"	Stephanie Arnett	Brian Hall	Doris Umschaden	July 26, 2019	221	N/A
Bob signs a game show with Bingo and Rolly.
49b	24b	"Empire State of Mind"	Bill Breneisen	Jean Ansolabehere	Latoya Raveneau	July 26, 2019	221	N/A
When Bob's trip to the Empire State Building is canceled, the pups and ARF head to New York to bring the Empire State Building to Bob.
50a	25a	"Bob's Dream Vacation"	Stephanie Arnett	Jean Ansolabehere	Doris Umschaden	August 2, 2019	225	N/A
Bob wants to wake up on an island, so the pups head out to an island with Bob while he is asleep.
50b	25b	"The Mystery of the Missing Golf Ball"	Bill Breneisen	Brian Hall	Latoya Raveneau	August 2, 2019	225	N/A
Bingo and Rolly investigate why the golf balls in a miniature golf course end up lost.
51a	26a	"I Heart Rufus"	Bill Breneisen	Denise Downer	Misty Marsden	August 23, 2019	226	N/A
Rufus is fed up with Cupcake's inconsideration to him and opts to be with Keia whom Rufus finds nicer, leading Cupcake to seek Bingo and Rolly's help to make things right.
51b	26b	"Trolley Trouble"	Scott Bern	Jessica Carleton	Nicolette Ray and Robert Sledge	August 23, 2019	226	N/A
When Bob forgets his camera on the trolley, Bingo and Rolly head out to find it.
52a	27a	"Desert Pups"	Scott Bern	Sandra Payne	Fred Cline and Robert Sledge	September 6, 2019	224	N/A
Bob's car got a flat tire while on there road trip, so the pups team up with some new friends to find a tire.
52b	27b	"Okavango Odyssey"	Stephanie Arnett	Jessica Carleton	Brandon Kruse and Rory Smith	September 6, 2019	224	N/A
Bob's mom loses her locket somewhere in the Okavango Delta, the pugs look for the locked with help from the locals.
53a	28a	"Cuckoo for Cuckoo Clocks"	Stephanie Arnett	Brian Hall	Rory Smith	September 13, 2019	227	N/A
The pups head to Germany to find a replacement for Bob's old cuckoo clock.
53b	28b	"Good Reef"	Bill Breneisen and Dan Fausett	S : Cassie Soliday; T : Jean Ansolabehere	Tamal Henley and Latoya Raveneau	September 13, 2019	227	N/A
While on a scuba vacation, Bingo and Rolly search the coral reefs for Bob's lost diving flipper.
54a	29a	"How ARF Got His Bark Back"	Bill Breneisen and Dan Fausett	Du Kirpalani	Misty Marsden and Michael Deiderich	September 27, 2019	229	N/A
When A.R.F.'s voice box broke, Bingo, Rolly and Keia race to find an inventor for a new voice box.
54b	29b	"Sir Bob"	Scott Bern	Brian Hall	Nicolette Ray and Rory Smith	September 27, 2019	229	N/A
An actor, who plays a knight in a stage play, is missing his helmet and will not perform without it, so Bingo and Rolly make it their mission to find it.
55a	30a	"To the Library!"	Stephanie Arnett	Jean Ansolabehere	Rory Smith	October 14, 2019	230	N/A
When Bob loses a library book on their vacation, the pugs head out around the world again to find it.
55b	30b	"ARF's Birthday"	Bill Breneisen and Dan Fausett	Jessica Carleton	Tamal Henley	October 14, 2019	230	N/A
Bingo, Rolly and Keia are on a mission to set up a surprise party for A.R.F.'s birthday.

=== Season 3 (2019–20) ===
No. overall	No. in season	Title	Directed by	Written by	Storyboard by	Original release date	Prod. code	US viewers (millions)
56a	1a	"Welcome to Puppy Playcare!"	Stephanie Arnett	Michael Olson	Rory Smith	November 8, 2019	301	0.39
Bob creates an indoor playground for dogs.
56b	1b	"The Naptime Chronicles"	Scott Bern and Tim Maltby	Jean Ansolabehere	Brandon Kruse	November 8, 2019	301	0.39
Hissy suddenly has insomnia, so Bingo and Rolly try to find ways to help Hissy get some rest.
57a	2a	"Bob and Ana's Bubble Bummer"	Stephanie Arnett	Jessica Carleton	Doris Umschaden	November 15, 2019	303	N/A
Bob has a bubble-powered bus which he plans to take to a parade, but it suddenly breaks down.
57b	2b	"Seen Any Seashells?"	Dan Fausett	Brian Hall	Nicolette Ray	November 15, 2019	303	N/A
Ana accidentally breaks her favorite seashell ornament. Bingo, Rolly, and Keia set off to find a replacement.
58a	3a	"Turkey on the Town"	Scott Bern and Tim Maltby	Brian Hall	Brandon Kruse	November 22, 2019	304	N/A
Bingo and Rolly try to get a turkey as a model for Chloe's painting.
58b	3b	"Friendship Feast"	Stephanie Arnett	Jean Ansolabehere	Rory Smith	November 22, 2019	304	N/A
The pups get pumpkin-spice flavored dog food for a feast while Cupcake thinks of something to be thankful for.
59a	4a	"Elves for a Day!"	Dan Fausett	Brian Hall	Melanie Joe	December 6, 2019	305	N/A
The pups help the elves get ready for Christmas.: This is the first episode to be animated by Rainbow SpA, which gave the series a brand new animation style.
59b	4b	"The Dreidel Dilemma"	Scott Bern and Tim Maltby	Jessica Carleton	Fred Cline	December 6, 2019	305	N/A
Bingo and Rolly take a dreidel Chloe made to Florida.
60a	5a	"Chin Up, Pups"	Dan Fausett	Jessica Carleton	Nicolette Ray	January 3, 2020	306	0.63
Bingo and Rolly meet a celebrity pup named Filbert and take him to the hospital to cheer up a kid.
60b	5b	"The Wind Beneath my Paws!"	Stephanie Arnett	Sean Coyle	Rory Smith and Doris Umschaden	January 3, 2020	306	0.63
Bingo, Rolly, Lollie and A.R.F. try to get a poster Bob made for Ana back on a windy day.
61a	6a	"Bingo and Rolly's Playcare Picnic Party"	Scott Bern and Tim Maltby	S : Michael Olson; T : Brian Hall	Celia Kendrick	January 31, 2020	307	0.27
Keia is sad when she misses the play care picnic party because Keia has to go to the vet, so gang try to have their own specifically for her.
61b	6b	"Judge Rolly"	Stephanie Arnett	Jean Ansolabehere	Rory Smith	January 31, 2020	307	0.27
To deal with the problems of the dogs at the park, Rolly becomes their judge, then takes advantage of his duties.
62a	7a	"Valentine's Day Mix-Up"	Tim Maltby	Brian Hall	Brandon Kruse	February 7, 2020	310	0.46
A.R.F. accidentally mails Ana's package to Italy when Bonnie's was supposed to go there.
62b	7b	"A Stinky Story"	Stephanie Arnett	Jessica Carleton	Rory Smith	February 7, 2020	310	0.46
Bingo and Rolly use their sniffing skills to help a young skunk get home.
63a	8a	"Birthday Heroes for Hero"	Dan Fausett	Jessica Carleton	Melanie Joe	February 21, 2020	308	0.32
The pups try to fix Hero's new birthday toy after Rolly and Keia accidentally break it.
63b	8b	"Maple Cheer-Up"	Scott Bern; Tim Maltby	Jean Ansolabehere	Fred Cline	February 21, 2020	308	0.32
The pugs head to Canada to find Maple Syrup for Bob. There, they were allowed to make maple syrup, with help from animals.
64a	9a	"Somewhere Under the Rainbow"	Dan Fausett	Jean Ansolabehere	Melanie Joe	March 6, 2020	311	0.36
Bingo and Rolly search for a cooking Bob can use to make a St. Patrick's Day meal.
64b	9b	"Yoga Pups"	Tim Maltby	Cassie Soliday	Fred Cline	March 6, 2020	311	0.36
Bingo and Rolly look for special stretchy trousers for Bob to wear at a yoga class after their owner accidentally made a hole on regular ones while practicing.
65a	10a	"The House that Bulworth Built!"	Stephanie Arnett	Jean Ansolabehere	Celia Kendrick	March 20, 2020	309	0.64
Bingo and Rolly accidentally bash Bulworth's house to pieces, but renovate it as compensation. Bulworth, however, is still glum because Bulworth wishes to see his father Pops whom Bulworth has not seen in quite a while.
65b	10b	"Moon Rescue Mission"	Dan Fausett	Brian Hall	Nicolette Ray	March 20, 2020	309	0.64
Bingo and Rolly fly to the moon with ARF and Rover to rescue Rover's brother, Spots who lost power and is stranded on the lunar environment.
66a	11a	"A Light for the Lighthouse"	Stephanie Arnett	Jessica Carleton	Doris Umschaden	April 3, 2020	312	0.46
Bingo and Rolly aim to replace the damaged light bulb in the lighthouse so Bob can see the glow at night. NOTE: Hissy appears in this episode, but does not speak
66b	11b	"Music City Mishap"	Dan Fausett	Jean Ansolabehere	Nicolette Ray	April 3, 2020	312	0.46
Bob finds a guitar under his café table and looks to return it to its owner.
67a	12a	"Anchors Away"	Tim Maltby	Brian Hall	Brandon Kruse	May 1, 2020	313	0.40
When Bingo and Rolly accidentally detach a houseboat from the dock, they team up with their friends to bring it back before Bob returns.
67b	12b	"Prospector Pups"	Stephanie Arnett	Jessica Carleton	Celia Kendrick	May 1, 2020	313	0.40
The pugs go on a mission to find gold for Bob.
68a	13a	"Give 'Em the Boot"	Tim Maltby	Jean Ansolabehere	Melanie Joe	May 15, 2020	314	0.38
Bingo and Rolly search for the perfect pair of cowboy boots so Bob can go line dancing, but they got assistance from other animals.
68b	13b	"Tik Tok, Broken Clock"	Dan Fausett	Brian Hall	Fred Cline	May 15, 2020	314	0.38
Bob was disappointed that a clock tower in a small town he's visiting is broken and won't hear the bells, the pugs go on a mission to fix the clock.
69a	14a	"Keia's Birthday Balloon Bash"	Stephanie Arnett	S : Eva Konstantopoulos; S/T : Jean Ansolabehere	Doris Umschaden	May 29, 2020	315	0.48
ARF loses Keia's special birthday balloon, thus Bingo and Rolly go to find a replacement.
69b	14b	"Hide-and-Go-Sleep"	Dan Fausett	Jessica Carleton	Nicolette Ray	May 29, 2020	315	0.48
In a game of hide-and-seek, Rolly finds all his playmates, except Cody. This leads Bingo and Rolly to thinking Cody returned home which is hundreds of miles away, but they still bother to go there.
70a	15a	"Bob's Blue Belt"	Tim Maltby	Brian Hall	Brandon Kruse	June 26, 2020	316	N/A
Bob's martial arts class ran out of blue belts and be left out of the class photo, so the pugs head to a mission to get a blue belt.
70b	15b	"The Playcare Heist"	Stephanie Arnett	S : Jean Ansolabehere; T : Eva Konstantopoulos	Celia Kendrick	June 26, 2020	316	N/A
When Keia accidentally left Bunny Monkey at playcare, she and the pugs try to get the toy after hours.
71a	16a	"The Lab Four"	Dan Fausett	Cooper Sweeney	Fred Cline	July 3, 2020	317	0.43
The dogs of a music quartet is missing.
71b	16b	"Feelin' Antsy"	Tim Maltby	Jessica Carleton	Melanie Joe	July 3, 2020	317	0.43
The kibble of Bingo, Rolly, Keia, and Lollie get infested with ants.
72a	17a	"Suitcase Switcheroo"	Stephanie Arnett	Jean Ansolabehere	Spencer Laudiero	July 17, 2020	318	0.39
Bob loses his suitcase and it is up to Bingo and Rolly to find it.
72b	17b	"More Cowbell for Bob"	Dan Fausett	Brian Hall	Nicolette Ray	July 17, 2020	318	0.39
Bob is looking to have a reunion performance with his former bandmates. However, his instrument, a cowbell, is broken.
73a	18a	"Firefighter Pups"	Tim Maltby	S : Jean Ansolabehere; T : Sandra Payne	Brandon Kruse	July 30, 2020	319	0.41
Bingo and Rolly become firefighter pups.
73b	18b	"Hike Paw"	Stephanie Arnett	Jean Ansolabehere	Celia Kendrick	July 30, 2020	319	0.41
The pugs use their senses to get home from a hike. Accompanied by Donna, they go to find a map.
74a	19a	"Pups in the Apple"	Tim Maltby	Denise Downer	Melanie Joe	August 14, 2020	320	0.40
The pugs head to New York City to find a "Big Apple" for Bob to make a pie.
74b	19b	"Won't You Be My Puppy"	Dan Fausett	Jessica Carleton	Fred Cline	August 14, 2020	320	0.40
Bingo and Rolly join forces with a dog named Floyd to find their favorite television host's special sweater in time for his show.
75a	20a	"Search and Rescue"	Stephanie Arnett	Brian Hall	Katya Bowser	August 21, 2020	321	0.41
Bingo and Rolly are made honorary Coast Guard pups to keep every pet safe.
75b	20b	"Over the Dog Park Wall"	Dan Fausett	Brian Hall	Nicolette Ray	August 21, 2020	321	0.41
Zeus' frisbee lands in the yard of a dog who is very hostile to outsiders.
76a	21a	"Mini-Golfin Guard Pups"	Tim Maltby	Jessica Carleton	Brandon Kruse	September 18, 2020	322	0.18
Bingo and Rolly help Boss guard a miniature golf course.
76b	21b	"Summer Splash Bash"	Stephanie Arnett	Cassie Soliday	Celia Kendrick	September 18, 2020	322	0.18
Bob receives a water slide set. Bob, however, is unable to assemble it because the package is missing instructions, which his pups and ARF set off to find.
77a	22a	"The Bird Beard"	Dan Fausett	Jessica Carleton	Fred Cline	September 25, 2020	323	0.21
A bird dwells in Santa Clause's beard, and refuses to leave.
77b	22b	"The Royal Egg Hunt"	Tim Maltby	Brian Hall	Melanie Joe	September 25, 2020	323	0.21
Bingo and Rolly help Crumpet find the UK queen's missing egg-shaped ornament.
78a	23a	"221B Barker Street"	Dan Fausett	Jean Ansolabehere	Melanie Joe	October 2, 2020	302	0.26
Bingo and Rolly search for whoever took a pot full of candies at Puppy Playcare.
78b	23b	"Leaf It to Puppies"	Scott Bern and Tim Maltby	Brian Hall	Fred Cline	October 2, 2020	302	0.26
Bob wants to keep three piles of raked leaves in shape, thus Bingo and Rolly try to keep them that way as Bob goes out for work.
79a	24a	"Puppies and Pandas"	Stephanie Arnett	Brian Hall	Doris Umschaden	October 9, 2020	324	0.28
Bob accidentally deletes his video of a panda, thus Bingo and Rolly head to China to make a new one.
79b	24b	"Orange You Glad?"	Dan Fausett	Cassie Soliday	Nicolette Ray	October 9, 2020	324	0.28
Bingo, Rolly, and Lollie travel around to obtain and give oranges to an orange juice stand at a park that suddenly runs out of the fruits.
80a	25a	"ARF's Robot Wish"	Tim Maltby	Brian Hall	Brandon Kruse	October 15, 2020	325	0.29
Upon seeing ARF and Rover happily reunite, ARF wishes the pugs had a robot dog brother to spend time with.
80b	25b	"Missing Mission Collar"	Stephanie Arnett	Jessica Carleton	Celia Kendrick	October 15, 2020	325	0.29
Bob accidentally mails Bingo and Rolly's hightech collars to Bonnie, who is in Africa.: Note: This is the last time Issac Ryan Brown and Sam Lavagnino voice Bingo and Rolly respectively, due to both hitting puberty.

=== Season 4 (2020–21) ===
No. overall	No. in season	Title	Directed by	Written by	Storyboard by	Original release date	Prod. code	US viewers (millions)
81a	1a	"The New Crew"	Stephanie Arnett	Jessica Carleton	Celia Kendrick (episode); Melanie Joe (song)	October 23, 2020	401	0.20
Two new puppies named Auggie and Mo arrive at Puppy Playcare.: Note: Starting with this episode, Elisha "EJ" Williams and Gracen Newton replace Issac Ryan Brown and Sam Lavagnino as Bingo and Rolly.
81b	1b	"Raiders of the Lost Bark"	Dan Fausett	Brian Hall	Fred Cline (episode); Nicolette Ray (song)	October 23, 2020	401	0.20
Bingo and Rolly go on a Indiana Jones-based mission to save BARK when Dr. G loses him.
82a	2a	"Pups on Parade"	Dan Fausett and Shellie Kvilvang	Denise Downer	Steve Moore (episode); Melanie Joe (song)	November 13, 2020	403	0.25
When a balloon on Bob's Playcare Parade float goes missing just before the annual Fall Parade starts, Bingo and Rolly go on a mission to find it.
82b	2b	"Pop's Promise"	Tim Maltby	Jessica Carleton	Christina Mijares (episode); Nicolette Ray (song)	November 13, 2020	403	0.25
While stuck in St. Louis, Bingo and Rolly make it their mission to get Bulworth home in time for the annual Friendship Feast.
83a	3a	"A Christmas Mission in Toyland"	Stephanie Arnett and Steve Moore	Brian Hall	Celia Kendrick (episode); Melanie Joe (song)	December 4, 2020	404	N/A
ARF tells Auggie and Mo a Christmas story about Bingo and Rolly trying to retrieve a dinosaur toy for Santa Claus, with the little help of some Robo-Puppies toys.
83b	3b	"Nine Lights Tonight"	Dan Fausett and Shellie Kvilvang	Jessica Carleton	Fred Cline (episode); Nicolette Ray (song)	December 4, 2020	404	N/A
The pups team up with a young reindeer named Randi to find nine lightbulbs for a device.
84a	4a	"New Year, New Bob"	Tim Maltby	Cassie Soliday	Christina Mijares (episode); Melanie Joe (song)	January 15, 2021	406	0.35
While in Hong Kong for the Chinese New Year, Bob's homemade lantern for the Lantern Festival accidentally floats out his hotel window.
84b	4b	"All for Show"	Dan Fausett and Shellie Kvilvang	Denise Downer	Ed Baker and Steve Moore (episode); Nicolette Ray (song)	January 15, 2021	406	0.35
Lollie wants to be in the annual dog show, so she asks Bingo and Rolly for help.
85a	5a	"My Bobby Valentine"	Shellie Kvilvang	Brian Hall	Fred Cline (episode); Melanie Joe (song)	January 29, 2021	407	0.33
Ana is excited to give Bob his favorite candy for Valentine's Day, but when every store is sold out, Bingo, Rolly and Lollie must track down the special holiday treat, enlisting the help of a rabbit named Lilly along the way.
85b	5b	"Musical Mission Mishap"	Steve Moore	Cassie Soliday	Doris Umschaden (episode); Nicolette Ray (song)	January 29, 2021	407	0.33
Bob surprises Ana by winning a walk-on role in "Pups: The Musical!" But when the costumes go missing, Bingo and Rolly search through Broadway to find them.
86a	6a	"Pups of the Dance"	Shellie Kvilvang	Brian Hall	Ed Baker (episode); Melanie Joe (song)	February 26, 2021	409	0.38
Bob and Bonnie are taking a traditional Irish dance class while visiting Ireland, but when the instructor goes missing, Bingo and Rolly set out to find him.
86b	6b	"Fantastic Pet Force Gems"	Tim Maltby	Denise Downer	Christina Mijares (episode); Nicolette Ray (song)	February 26, 2021	409	0.38
Bob and Ana enter a costume contest as a superhero duo, but when they realize they're missing special gems to complete their costumes, the crew go on a mission to find them.
87a	7a	"Pups in the Wild"	Tim Maltby	Denise Downer	Brandon Kruse (episode); Melanie Joe (song)	March 19, 2021	408	0.36
The pugs head to Canada to find a bear so Chloe and the Lil' Nature Scouts can get their badges.
87b	7b	"The Sunshine Pups"	Steve Moore	Jessica Carleton	Doris Umschaden (episode); Nicolette Ray (song)	March 19, 2021	408	0.36
After a week of rain ends, Bingo and Rolly organize a game of "Catch the Flag" on a sunny day.
88a	8a	"The Case of the Missing Badge"	Tim Maltby	Brian Hall	Brandon Kruse (episode); Melanie Joe (song)	April 9, 2021	405	0.22
When a K-9 dog named Haven discovers that her human's police badge is missing, she enlists Bingo and Rolly help.
88b	8b	"Rainy, Rainy, Don't Go Away"	Stephanie Arnett and Steve Moore	Jessica Carleton	Doris Umschaden (episode); Nicolette Ray (song)	April 9, 2021	405	0.22
The pups help Auggie and Mo overcome their fear during their first thunderstorm with a story.
89a	9a	"7th Inning Fetch"	Tim Maltby	Joe Morgan	Brandon Kruse (episode); Melanie Joe (song)	May 14, 2021	411	0.31
Bob and the Pugs head to the baseball Hall of Fame, and help Crash find the perfect baseball.
89b	9b	"National Bob Day"	Steve Moore	Sean Coyle	Doris Umschaden (episode); Nicolette Ray (song)	May 14, 2021	411	0.31
Bingo and Rolly throw a National Bob Day to make Bob feel special.
90a	10a	"Cupcake's Birthday"	Steve Moore	Cassie Soliday	Celia Kendrick (episode); Melanie Joe (song)	June 11, 2021	410	0.45
When the plans for Cupcake's birthday go awry, Rufus suggests that the gang find the perfect gift for her instead.
90b	10b	"Dog Wash Derby"	Shellie Kvilvang	Jessica Carleton	Fred Cline (episode); Nicolette Ray (song)	June 11, 2021	410	0.45
Bob has too much to do at Playcare, so the pups gear up to help.
91a	11a	"Under the Antarctic Lights"	Steve Moore	Denise Downer	Roger Dondis (episode); Melanie Joe (song)	July 23, 2021	413	0.26
The pups search for Bob's notebook full of snow toy ideas when he loses it while hiking in Antarctica.
91b	11b	"Oh, Key! D'oh! Key!"	Shellie Kvilvang	Joe Morgan	Adam Holmes (episode); Nicolette Ray (song)	July 23, 2021	413	0.26
When the Mayor loses the key to the city, the pugs go on a hunt to find it.
92a	12a	"The Soapbox Derby Heroes"	Shellie Kvilvang	Brian Hall	Ed Baker (episode); Melanie Joe (song)	August 6, 2021	412	0.29
The Fantastic Pet Force are on a mission to help their friend Orby return a soapbox car.
92b	12b	"Rubber Ducky Rescue"	Tim Maltby	Cassie Soliday	Christina Mijares (episode); Nicolette Ray (song)	August 6, 2021	412	0.29
When Sam leaves his favorite rubber ducky in Hawaii, Auggie and Mo enlist the help of the Fantastic Pet Force.
93a	13a	"Wedding Cake Kahunas"	Tim Maltby	Cassie Soliday	Brandon Kruse (episode); Melanie Joe (song)	September 10, 2021	414	0.27
When Bob can't come up with a design for his and Ana's wedding cake, the pugs and Lollie go on a mission to gather up cake ideas.
93b	13b	"Raspberry Beret"	Steve Moore	S : Jessica Carleton; T : Brian Hall	Doris Umschaden (episode); Nicolette Ray (song)	September 10, 2021	414	0.27
When Ana loses her special beret, the pugs and Lollie go on a mission to retrieve it.
94a	14a	"Halloween Puppy Fashion Show Party"	Tim Maltby	Cassie Soliday	Brandon Kruse (episode); Cypress Joe (song)	October 1, 2021	402	N/A
When Puppy Playcare throws a Halloween fashion show party, the pugs help Auggie and Mo find costumes.
94b	14b	"Full Moon Fever"	Stephanie Arnett and Steve Moore	Sean Coyle	Doris Umschaden (episode); Nicolette Ray (song)	October 1, 2021	402	N/A
Bob takes the pups to stay in his family cabin for a weekend away.
95a	15a	"Wedding Dress Mess"	Shellie Kvilvang	Denise Downer	Ed Baker (episode); Melanie Joe (song)	November 5, 2021	415	N/A
When Ana runs out of fabric for her wedding dress, the pugs set out to find the matching fabric.
95b	15b	"Coral Clean-up"	Tim Maltby	Cassie Soliday	Christina Mijares (episode); Roger Dondis and Nicolette Ray (song)	November 5, 2021	415	N/A
The pugs go on a mission to find Bob a pink manta ray in the Great Barrier Reef.
96a	16a	"Runaway Wedding Ring"	Steve Moore	Brian Hall	Brandon Kruse (episode); Melanie Joe (song)	November 19, 2021	416	N/A
When Ana's wedding ring accidentally rolls down the sink, Bingo and Rolly set out to recover it.
96b	16b	"Bob and Ana's Wedding"	Shellie Kvilvang	Sean Coyle	Adam Holmes (episode); Nicolette Ray (song)	November 19, 2021	416	N/A
Bingo, Rolly and Bob find themselves stranded in the middle of nowhere on Bob and Ana's wedding day.

=== Season 5 (2022–23) ===
No. overall	No. in season	Title	Directed by	Written by	Storyboard by	Original release date	Prod. code	US viewers (millions)
97a	1a	"New Pals on the Block"	Tim Maltby	Michael Olson	Brandon Kruse and Nicolette Ray (episode); Melanie Joe (song)	January 14, 2022	501	N/A
Bingo and Rolly take their new pet friends on their first mission to find kneepads.
97b	1b	"Aunt and Uncle Day"	Steve Moore	Denise Downer	Roger Dondis and Andy Friz; Melanie Joe (song)	January 14, 2022	501	N/A
When Darius' Aunt and Uncle Day gift accidentally gets sent out with the mail, the pugs lead Buster and Leo on a mission to bring it back.
98a	2a	"The Puppy Outdoor Play Day Games"	Shellie Kvilvang	Joe Morgan	Ed Baker and Kaitlin Callahan; Melanie Joe (song)	January 21, 2022	502	N/A
Bingo and Rolly host the Puppy Outdoor Play Day Games, but Nougat is the only one who is not a pup.
98b	2b	"For the Glove of the Game"	Tim Maltby	Sean Coyle	Christina Mijares-Doung and Nicolette Ray; Melanie Joe (song)	January 21, 2022	502	N/A
After Darius joins a little league team, Buster leads the pets to find him the perfect baseball glove.
99a	3a	"A Valentine's Gift for Ana"	Tim Maltby	Brian Hall	Brandon Kruse and Nicolette Ray	January 28, 2022	513	N/A
When Bob accidentally loses Ana's Valentine's Day gift, the pets make it their mission to find it.
99b	3b	"Build-A-Bunny Monkey"	Steve Moore	Denise Downer	Roger Dondis and Dan Root	January 28, 2022	513	N/A
When Keia accidentally rips her precious Bunny Monkey, the pets work together to put the toy back together.
100a	4a	"Family Pet Picture Day"	Tim Maltby	Cassie Soliday	Brandon Kruse and Nicolette Ray; Melanie Joe (song)	February 4, 2022	504	N/A
It's Family Pet Picture Day, and Darius is excited to get his first family photo!
100b	4b	"Cat Park"	Steve Moore	Denise Downer	Roger Dondis and Andy Friz; Melanie Joe (song)	February 4, 2022	504	N/A
The pugs lead Buster on a mission to create a cat park for Hissy and Leo.
101a	5a	"Return of the Go-Long Retriever"	Steve Moore	Brian Hall	Doris Umschaden, Andy Friz, and Dan Root; Kaitlin Callahan (song)	February 11, 2022	503	N/A
Darius is excited to present an updated puppy retriever toy that Bob invented at show and tell, but when it goes out of control, the pets must track it down.
101b	5b	"Pizza, Pisa!"	Shellie Kvilvang	Cassie Soliday	Adam Holmes and Kaitlin Callahan; Kaitlin Callahan (song)	February 11, 2022	503	N/A
Puppy Playcare is hosting a pizza party for pets and their people, but when there's no pizza, the pugs lead Roxy and Nougat on a mission to get more.
102a	6a	"The Dog Bone in the Stone"	Shellie Kvilvang	Joe Morgan	Ed Baker and Kaitlin Callahan	February 18, 2022	505	N/A
Buster gets his dog bone stuck in wet cement and he needs to wait for Bob to help him.
102b	6b	"Riding in Ice Cream Trucks with Pups"	Tim Maltby	Brian Hall	Christina Mijares-Doung and Nicolette Ray	February 18, 2022	505	N/A
The ice cream truck passes too quickly and the pets track it down.
103a	7a	"Buster Bluster"	Shellie Kvilvang	Joe Morgan	Ed Baker and Kaitlin Callahan; Cypress Joe (song)	February 25, 2022	508	N/A
When Buster hurts his right ear and has to wear a cone collar. The pugs and Leo make it their mission to make sure Buster has fun while wearing his cone collar.
103b	7b	"Runaway Runway"	Tim Maltby	Cassie Soliday	Christina Mijares-Doung and Nicolette Ray; Cypress Joe (song)	February 25, 2022	508	N/A
The pugs take Roxy and Nougat on a mission to find Grace a new pair of shoes.
104a	8a	"Find That Fiddle"	Shellie Kvilvang	Brian Hall	Kaitlin Callahan and Ed Baker	March 4, 2022	517	N/A
Bob is playing his fiddle at a festival, but when he finds his bow broken, the pets get him a new one.
104b	8b	"Cosmo Callahan and the Legend of the Crystal Squeaker"	Tim Maltby	Sean Coyle	Christina Mijares-Doung and Nicolette Ray	March 4, 2022	517	N/A
When Bob's TV stops working, the gang learns to use their imagination.
105a	9a	"Where's Nougat?"	Tim Maltby	Cassie Soliday	Brandon Kruse and Nicolette Ray	March 11, 2022	510	N/A
When Nougat gets left behind on a field trip, it's up to the pugs and Roxy to find and bring her back.
105b	9b	"A Very Taddy Birthday"	Steve Moore	Joe Morgan	Roger Dondis and Dan Root	March 11, 2022	510	N/A
When Taddy goes missing in Tad's tunnels, the crew make it their mission to find them.
106a	10a	"Puppy-Ki-Yay!"	Steve Moore	Brian Hall	Doris Umschaden and Dan Root	March 18, 2022	515	N/A
Bob is set to present an invention, but when it goes missing, the pugs stage a heist to bring it back to Bob.
106b	10b	"Underwater Down Under"	Shellie Kvilvang	Denise Downer	Ed Baker and Andy Friz	March 18, 2022	515	N/A
The pets go on a mission to Australia to find a webcam.
107a	11a	"Get Well Bingo"	Steve Moore	Cassie Soliday	Roger Dondis and Dan Root	March 25, 2022	516	N/A
When Keia disappears, after she went to get a gift for Bingo who is injured. Rolly and Lollie go on a mission to find her, leaving Bingo alone and that he must find his friends.
107b	11b	"Big Wheelies"	Tim Maltby	Joe Morgan	Brandon Kruse and Nicolette Ray	March 25, 2022	516	N/A
The pets team up with two pets, Jax and Pawnica, to return a racecar after their owner Dani loses it.
108a	12a	"Surf's Up, Pups!"	Steve Moore	Denise Downer	Doris Umschaden, Andy Friz and Dan Root	June 10, 2022	506	N/A
When Grace doesn't have a surfboard for her surfing lesson in Hawaii, the pets set out to find one.
108b	12b	"Rock and Roller Pups"	Shellie Kvilvang-O'Brien	Cassie Soliday	Adam Holmes and Kaitlin Callahan	June 10, 2022	506	N/A
The pets go on a mission to find Grace a disco ball for her birthday.
109a	13a	"Sumo Pups"	Shellie Kvilvang-O'Brien	Cassie Soliday	Kaitlin Callahan & Ed Baker	July 15, 2022	514	N/A
When Bob's favorite wrestler loses his mawashi, the pugs go on a mission to find it.
109b	13b	"The Search for the Golden Ball"	Tim Maltby	Joe Morgan	Christina Mijares-Doung and Nicolette Ray	July 15, 2022	514	N/A
When the soccer trophy goes missing, the gang goes on a mission to find it.
110a	14a	"Paw-Rates of the Caribbean"	Steve Moore	Joe Morgan	Doris Umschaden and Dan Root	August 19, 2022	512	N/A
When Darius spends the weekend with his parents on their vacation in the Caribbean, he discovers a torn treasure map, in which his pets set off to fix it.
110b	14b	"Bob's Book Club"	Shellie Kvilvang-O'Brien	Cassie Soliday	Adam Holmes and Kaitlin Callahan	August 19, 2022	512	N/A
After Bob finishes a mystery book, he learns that the author, Allison Misty, is in town, so the pugs team up with a chicken named Maple to find clues.
111a	15a	"The Pumpkin King"	Tim Maltby	Brian Hall	Brandon Kruse and Nicolette Ray	September 28, 2022	507	N/A
When the Pumpkin King Crown goes missing, the pets make it their mission to find it.
111b	15b	"The Elf Who Halloween'd"	Steve Moore	Sean Coyle	Roger Dondis and Dan Root	September 28, 2022	507	N/A
An elf friend named Chip is in town to experience Halloween, but the pets try too hard to show him how to have fun, which sets the town to be magical.
112a	16a	"A Very Berry Friendship Feast"	Steve Moore	Brian Hall	Doris Umschaden and Dan Root	November 4, 2022	509	N/A
The pets must search for cranberries for the Friendship Feast.
112b	16b	"Nature Pillow Pups"	Shellie Kvilvang-O'Brien	Denise Downer	Adam Holmes and Kaitlin Callahan	November 4, 2022	509	N/A
The pets set out on a wilderness mission to find a special pillow before Darius' bedtime.
113a	17a	"Wrap Party Pups"	Shellie Kvilvang-O'Brien	Denise Downer	Ed Baker and Kaitlin Callahan	December 1, 2022 (Note: This episode was first released on Disney+ on November 23, 2022.)	511	N/A
The pets go on a mission to find Grace's gift that was shipped by an airline to Alaska before she needs to swap presents.
113b	17b	"Fixing Santa's Sleigh"	Tim Maltby	Brian Hall	Christina Mijares-Doung and Nicolette Ray	December 1, 2022	511	N/A
When Santa's sleigh breaks down mid-delivery, the pets make it their mission to fix it.
114a	18a	"Big Little Surprise"	Shellie Kvilvang-O'Brien	Joe Morgan	Adam Holmes and Kaitlin Callahan	January 6, 2023	518	N/A
Ana has a big surprise for Bob when he gets home from work.
114b	18b	"Bob and Ana's Nursery Mural"	Steve Moore	Cassie Soliday	Doris Umschaden and Dan Root	January 6, 2023	518	N/A
Bob and Ana are painting a mural in the nursery, but when they run out of paint, the pugs go on a mission to find some.
115a	19a	"Baby Rattle Round Up"	Tim Maltby	Brian Hall	Brandon Kruse and Nicolette Ray	January 13, 2023	519	N/A
Darius can't wait to gift his rattle at Bob and Ana's baby shower, but when the rattle rolls away, the pets try to find it before time is up.
115b	19b	"No Place Like Home"	Steve Moore	Maralisa Ortiz and Cassie Soliday	Roger Dondis and Dan Root	January 13, 2023	519	N/A
When Roxy and Nougat stay the night with Bob and Ana, the pugs make it their mission to throw them the best sleepover.
116a	20a	"Baby Crib Caper"	Shellie Kvilvang-O'Brien	Denise Downer	Kaitlin Callahan and Ed Baker	January 20, 2023	520	N/A
The pets go on a mission to find a crib for Bob and Ana's baby.
116b	20b	"Here's Looking at You, Kid"	Tim Maltby	Joe Morgan	Christina Mijares-Doung and Nicolette Ray	January 20, 2023	520	N/A
When Bob says the baby will be delivered today, the pups go on a mission to find Bob and Ana's baby.

== Shorts ==
=== Short overview ===
Series	Title	Episodes	Originally released	
Series	Title	Episodes	First released	Last released
1	Playtime with Puppy Dog Pals	8	August 20, 2018	August 25, 2018
2	Puppy Dog Pals Playcare	8	August 26, 2019	September 19, 2019

=== Playtime with Puppy Dog Pals (2018) ===
No. overall	No. in series	Title	Online release date
1	1	"Doghouse Dance-Off"	August 20, 2018
2	2	"Don't Blink!"	August 20, 2018
3	3	"Puppy Pool Party"	August 21, 2018
4	4	"Stomp, Thump, and Pup!"	August 21, 2018
5	5	"Epic High Paw"	August 22, 2018
6	6	"Pug Tag"	August 23, 2018
7	7	"Boxing Day"	August 24, 2018
8	8	"Follow the Leader"	August 25, 2018

=== Puppy Dog Pals Playcare (2019) ===
No. overall	No. in series	Title	Online release date
9	1	"Making Friends!"	August 26, 2019
10	2	"Storytime Wiggles"	August 27, 2019
11	3	"Show and Tell"	August 28, 2019
12	4	"Up and at 'Em"	August 29, 2019
13	5	"Project Funway"	September 16, 2019
14	6	"Young Pups"	September 17, 2019
15	7	"Picture Pups"	September 18, 2019
16	8	"Forget Pups Not"	September 19, 2019
