= Bad Luck Creek =

Bad Luck Creek may refer to:

- Bad Luck Creek (Alabama)
- Bad Luck Creek (Arkansas)
- Bad Luck Creek (Idaho County, Idaho)
- Bad Luck Creek (Shoshone County, Idaho)
- Bad Luck Creek (Montana)
- Bad Luck Creek (Texas)
