= Why We Fight (John Wesley Harding album) =

Studio album by John Wesley Harding
- Released: 1992
- Genre: Folk
- Label: Sire
- Producer: Steve Berlin

John Wesley Harding chronology
The Name Above the Title (1991)	Why We Fight (1992)	Pett Levels: The Summer EP (1993)

Why We Fight is an album by the English musician John Wesley Harding, released in 1992. As with many of Harding's albums, the title is a reference to Frank Capra's work; Harding had considered using the Kinks homage Give the People What I Want as the title. Harding described the album's sound as "folk noir". Harding supported the album by touring with Barenaked Ladies and Mare Winningham.

== Production ==
Written in San Francisco and recorded in Los Angeles, the album was produced by Steve Berlin. Harding picked Berlin after hearing the producer's work on Leo Kottke's Great Big Boy. Greg Leisz played pedal steel on the album. Green on Red's Chris Cacavas contributed vocals. Harding wrote "Hitler's Tears", a song about fascism, after watching television footage of Pat Buchanan and David Duke.

== Critical reception ==
Professional ratings
Review scores
Source	Rating
AllMusic	4/5 stars
Deseret News	3.5/4 stars
The Encyclopedia of Popular Music	3/5 stars
The Indianapolis Star	3.5/4 stars
MusicHound Rock: The Essential Album Guide	3/5 stars
The Republican	3.5/5 stars

Trouser Press wrote that Harding "opts for earthier, less contrived grooves and cuts down (though hardly eliminates) the [Elvis] Costello echoes." The Washington Post stated that the album "replaces the musical Attractions of Harding's previous work with a more rustic, less derivative approach." The Chicago Tribune thought that the songs "wrestle with moral dilemmas and revel in humanistic detail."

Stereo Review called Why We Fight "a lengthy album whose politics are always correct and almost always obvious," noting that Harding "writes facilely about iconic figures ... and poses questions that are more well-intentioned than illuminating." The Indianapolis Star deemed the songs "well-scripted tales with catchy tunes." The Vancouver Sun labeled "Kill the Messenger" "a swinging folk-rocker that may be Harding's best tune yet." The Star-Ledger panned the "lyrical vagueness." The Knoxville News Sentinel listed it as the fourth best album of 1992.

AllMusic called Why We Fight "arguably his strongest album and boasting the perfect balance of folk and attitude."

== Track listing ==
No.	Title	Length
1.	"Kill the Messenger"
2.	"Ordinary Weekend"
3.	"The Truth"
4.	"Dead Centre of Town"
5.	"Into the Wind"
6.	"Hitler's Tears"
7.	"Get Back Down"
8.	"Me Against Me"
9.	"The Original Miss Jesus"
10.	"Where the Bodies Are"
11.	"Millionaire's Dream"
12.	"Come Gather Round"
