= Miss Fortune =

Miss Fortune may refer to:

== Music ==
- Miss Fortune (band), an American band
- Miss Fortune (album), a 2002 album by Allison Moorer
- Miss Fortune (opera), an opera composed by Judith Weir
- "Miss Fortune", a song from the album Distance Inbetween by The Coral

== Other ==
- Miss Fortune (film), a 2023 South Korean film starring Uhm Jung-hwa
- "Miss Fortune", an episode of Ghost Whisperer
- Miss Fortune, a character from the video game League of Legends

== See also ==
- MF (disambiguation)
- Misfortune (disambiguation)
