= ClassTV =

- Country: Italy
- Broadcast area: Italy

Programming
- Language: Italian
- Picture format: 4:3 (576i, SDTV)

Ownership
- Owner: Class Editori
- Sister channels: Class CNBC

History
- Launched: 2003 (as Class News)
- Closed: 27 January 2015
- Replaced by: Sky TG24
- Former names: Class News (2003-2010); Class News msnbc (2010-2011); ClassTV MSNBC(2011-2013)

Links
- Website: ClassEditori

Availability

Streaming media
- Class TV: Live Streaming

ClassTV was an Italian TV Channel launched in 2003 owned by Class Editori (which also owns Class CNBC).

The channel originally launched as an all-news channel and renamed before Class News msnbc on 6 September 2010 and after ClassTV MSNBC on 2 May 2011.

It was later relaunched as an Italian news and movie channel before its closure. It was broadcast in Italy on DTT channel 27 on Mux Mediaset 2.

On 27 January 2015, the channel ceased transmission, and was replaced by a series of filter to promote Sky TG24's launch over the air.

== Programming ==
In 2001, Class Editori partnered with NBCUniversal to form Class CNBC, a joint venture of business television. It was the first and only business TV channel in Italy, utilizing CNBC's global network for 24/7 financial news and journalism. Class CNBC broadcasts on SKY Italia channel 507 and on other streaming services, such as Milano Finanza, "Le TV di Class Editori" App and GO TV.

The earliest broadcast channel of Class Editori is the Gambero Rosso Channel, which first aired on SKY on 1 July, 1999. This channel mainly covers food, wine, Italian culture, and tourism. Gambero Rosso is sometimes broadcast abroad in China, Switzerland, and on Alitalia flights (now ITA Airways).

Other Class Editori channels include Class Tv Moda and Class Life Channel. Both broadcast to SKY Italia (channels 180 and 507 respectively) and cover lifestyle and travel topics.

Old version of ClassTV have transmitted all day:

- news including current affairs, talk show, business, sport

Quelli del lunedì, Primo tempo, Punto e a capo, TG Giorno, TG Sera, Capital - La sfida, Watchdog

- NBC news

NBC Nightly News

- weather programs including precise forecasts for all world by the Weather Channel

Classmeteo SHOW, Lombroso variabile

- lifestyle and luxury programming

Models NYC, Ladies, "Design & Living" Class Life 7, ARTV, Porsche Live, Class Ride & Drive.

- scientific, technology and medical programs

Avatar, il mondo nuovo, Una vita per la scienza, My Tech Lab, Doctor 2+.

Instead, every Tuesday and Wednesday are transmitted:

- Solo Classici including movies and TV series

La meglio gioventù, I viceré, Maria José - L'ultima Regina, I ragazzi di via Panispema, Giovanni Falcone, Genova - La Superba.

On Friday is broadcast the heading on Italian cinema

Cinema Italiano Sono Loro!

=== TV hosts ===
- Emmanuela Anderle
- Angela Antetomaso
- Giada Borioli
- Maurizio Bossi
- Edoardo Calcagno
- Lorenzo Catania
- Davide Dalla Libera (weatherman)
- Dario Donato
- Manuela Donghi
- Carlo Frioli
- Davide Fumagalli
- Marco Gaiazzi
- Serena Giacomin (weatherwoman)
- Luca Lombroso (weatherman in 2000s)
- Sergio Luciano
- Cristina Finocchi Mahne
- Alessandro Cecchi Paone
- Roberto Pellegrino
- Mariangela Pira
- Michele Salmi (weatherman)
- Linda Santaguida
- Silvia Sgaravatti
- Maurizio Toma
- Christian Toscano
- Marina Valerio
- Matteo Zanetti (weatherman)
- Michele Cicoria (weatherman)

== Places of transmission ==
It is transmitted in 35 airports and in the Milan Subway.

== Logos ==
2003-2010

== See also ==
- Digital television in Italy
- Television film
