= Trad Arr Jones =

Studio album by John Wesley Harding
- Released: February 9, 1999
- Recorded: November 19, 1998 – November 21, 1998
- Genre: Folk rock
- Length: 73:09
- Label: Zero Hour

John Wesley Harding chronology
Dynablob 2 (1998)	Trad Arr Jones (1999)	Dynablob 3 (1999)

Trad Arr Jones is a tribute album to Nic Jones by British-American folk singer John Wesley Harding. The album consists of Harding's covers of Jones' arrangements of eleven traditional songs, hence the album's title, which is short for "Traditional, Arranged by Jones". It is very different from Harding's previous albums, partly because Harding used to dislike English folk music like Jones'.

Professional ratings
Review scores
Source	Rating
AllMusic	3/5 stars
Robert Christgau	(dud)
CMJ New Music Monthly	(favorable)
Exclaim!	(favorable)
No Depression	(favorable)
Orlando Weekly	(favorable)
Pitchfork Media	7.3/10
The Washington Post	(mixed)

== Track listing ==
1. The Singer's Request
2. Little Musgrave
3. The Golden Glove
4. Annachie Gordon
5. The Flandyke Shore
6. William and Nancy's Parting
7. William Glenn
8. The Bonny Bunch of Roses
9. Master Kilby
10. Annan Water
11. Isle of France

== Bonus Tracks on Appleseed Recordings 2000 Reissue ==
1. Canadee-i-o
2. Billy, Don't You Weep for Me
3. Edward
4. The Humpback Whale

== Personnel ==
- Kurt Bloch – Bass, Engineer, Guest Artist, Guitar (Electric), Mixing, Producer
- Dave Fisher – Engineer, Mixing
- Hammi – Design
- John Wesley Harding – Guitar (Acoustic), Liner Notes, Mixing, Primary Artist, Vocals
- Shelley Jackson – Paintings, Photography
- Nic Jones – Arranger
- Mike Musburger – Drums
- Jason Staczek – Accordion, Harpsichord, Organ (Hammond), Piano
- Paul Stubblebine – Mastering, Remastering
