= Here Comes the Groom (album) =

Studio album by John Wesley Harding
- Released: 1990
- Recorded: July 1989
- Studios: Eden, Chiswick
- Length: 64:31
- Label: Sire
- Producers: Andy Paley, John Wesley Harding, Tom Robinson

John Wesley Harding chronology
| God Made Me Do It: The Christmas EP (1989) | Here Comes the Groom (1990) | The Name Above the Title (1991) |

Here Comes the Groom is an album by folk-rock singer John Wesley Harding, released in 1990. Harding called the backing band the Good Liars. It included Pete Thomas and Bruce Thomas of the Attractions. Here Comes the Groom has a feel similar to classic Elvis Costello. Harding's articulate and biting vocal delivery, also reminiscent of Costello, retains a good dark sense of humor.

== Critical reception ==
Professional ratings
Review scores
| Source | Rating |
|---|---|
| AllMusic | 4.5/5 stars |
| Chicago Tribune | 3.5/4 stars |
| The Encyclopedia of Popular Music | 4/5 stars |
| MusicHound Rock: The Essential Album Guide | 4/5 stars |
| The Rolling Stone Album Guide | 4/5 stars |
| Select | 2/5 |

The Chicago Tribune wrote: "Possessed of an appealing, folky sensibility, Harding takes a musical approach that falls somewhere between folk and rock and manages to be lyrically offbeat enough of the time to make him one of the more interesting new talents around." Trouser Press called the album "a fine modern realization of the same honest singing and playing that typified England’s pub-rock graduates."

== Track listing ==
All songs were written by John Wesley Harding, except as noted

1. "Here Comes the Groom"
2. "Cathy's New Clown"
3. "Spaced Cowgirl"
4. "Scared of Guns"
5. "You're No Good"
6. "When the Sun Comes Up"
7. "The Devil in Me"
8. "An Audience with You"
9. "Dark Dark Heart"
10. "Same Thing Twice"
11. "Affairs of the Heart"
12. "Nothing I'd Rather Do" (Andy White, David Lewis, Harding)
13. "Things Snowball" (with Peter Case) (Peter Case, Harding)
14. "The Red Rose and the Briar" (David Lewis, Harding)
15. "Bastard Son"

== Personnel ==
- John Wesley Harding - guitar, vocals
- Kirsty MacColl - vocal harmony on "Affairs of the Heart"
- Dave Alvin - guitar on "You're No Good"
- Geraint Watkins - accordion on "Affairs of the Heart"
- Ken Craddock - keyboards
- Jeff Lass - keyboards
- Bob Loveday - fiddle
- Matthew McCauley - vocal harmony
- Keith Nelson - banjo on "Same Thing Twice"
- Tom Robinson - keyboards on "Bastard Son"
- Peter Case - guitar, vocals on "Things Snowball"
- Andy Paley - guitar, vocal harmony
- Paul Riley - bass
- Bruce Thomas - bass
- Pete Thomas - drums, percussion
- Steve Donnelly - guitar, autoharp
- Choir of Julian Dawson - chorus harmony on "Dark Dark Heart"
- Dalai Lama Horns - horns
