= Class Editori =

Italian media company

Class Editori S.p.A.
- Company type: Public (BIT: CLE)
- Industry: Media
- Founded: 1986
- Headquarters: Milan, Italy
- Key people: Paolo Panerai (Founder and CEO); Victor Uckmar (Chairman)
- Products: Magazines, newspapers, radio stations, television channels, news agency
- Revenue: €64.72 million (2020)
- Operating income: ▼ -€20.4 million (2020)
- Net income: ▼ -€11,98 (2020)
- Number of employees: 340 (2020)
- Website: Class Editori

Class Editori S.p.A. is an Italian media conglomerate that is based in Milan and listed on the Italian Stock Exchange since November 30, 1998. It is also active in the field of television, radio and video information systems (Telesia Sistemi) broadcast in the main airports and in the Rome and Milan metros.

== Overview ==
Founded in 1986 by Paolo Panerai, the publisher is primarily devoted to financial and lifestyle news.

The group publishes the following magazines and newspapers in Italy:

- MF Milano Finanza
- Italia Oggi
- Capital
- Class
- Luna
- Gentleman
- Campus
- Case & Country
- Patrimoni
- Global Finance

The company operates three television channels on satellite in Italy:

- Class News
- Class TV Moda available on Eutelsat Hot Bird free to air
- Class CNBC (joint venture with NBC Universal and Mediaset)

Class Editori's other ventures include the news agency MF Dow Jones News (a joint venture with Dow Jones), the classical radio station Radio Classica.
