= John Wesley Harding's New Deal =

Studio album by John Wesley Harding
- Released: February 13, 1996
- Genre: Folk rock, pop rock
- Length: 52:56
- Label: Forward Records (an imprint of Rhino Records)
- Producer: Chris Von Sneidern

John Wesley Harding chronology
Why We Fight (1992)	John Wesley Harding's New Deal (1996)	Dynablob (1996)

John Wesley Harding's New Deal is an album by the folk-rock singer-songwriter John Wesley Harding, released on February 13, 1996, on Forward Records, an imprint of Rhino Records focused on releasing albums by new artists.

Professional ratings
Review scores
Source	Rating
AllMusic	3/5 stars
Robert Christgau	(dud)
Entertainment Weekly	B

== Track listing ==
All tracks are written by John Wesley Harding, except "Cupid and Psycho" co-written by Harding and David Lewis

No.	Title	Length
1.	"To Whom It May Concern"	4:26
2.	"Other People’s Failure"	3:52
3.	"The Secret Angel"	3:30
4.	"Kiss Me, Miss Liberty"	4:31
5.	"Heart Without a Home"	4:33
6.	"God Lives Upstairs"	5:32
7.	"Infinite Combinations"	3:40
8.	"The King is Dead Boring"	3:25
9.	"The Triumph of Trash"	3:01
10.	"Cupid and Psycho"	4:56
11.	"Still Photo"	4:12
12.	"In Paradise"	4:22
13.	"The Speed of Normal"	2:56
Total length:		52:56

2003 Reissue bonus tracks
No.	Title	Length
14.	"The Death of a Ghostwriter"	3:54
15.	"Let Us Now"	3:21
16.	"When the Beatles Hit America"	5:47
17.	"Kiss Me, Miss Liberty" (Live)	4:14
18.	"The Secret Angel #2"	5:40
Total length:		75:52

== Personnel ==
- John Wesley Harding - guitar, 12-string guitar, acoustic guitar, harmonica, Hammond organ, percussion, typewriter, vocals, backing vocals, arrangements
- Bennet Bowman - drums
- Greg Leisz -acoustic guitar, electric guitar, Steel guitar, bass guitar
- Robert Lloyd - accordion, Farfisa organ, mandolin, Hammond organ, piano
- David Phillips - pedal steel
- Tammy Rogers - cello, violin
- Denise Stace - bells
- Harry Stinson - engineer
- Peter Straus - bass
- Geoff Sykes - mastering
- Chris Von Sneidern - bass, drums, engineer, mixing, percussion, producer, tambourine, backing vocals, arrangements
