= The Name Above the Title =

Studio album by John Wesley Harding
- Released: 1991
- Genre: Alternative rock
- Length: 58:23
- Label: Sire
- Producer: Andy Paley

John Wesley Harding chronology
Here Comes the Groom (1990)	The Name Above the Title (1991)	Why We Fight (1992)

The Name Above the Title is an album by the folk-rock singer John Wesley Harding, released in 1991. It was his third successive Frank Capra-inspired album title, coming from the director's autobiography.

== Critical reception ==
Professional ratings
Review scores
Source	Rating
AllMusic	3/5 stars
The Encyclopedia of Popular Music	2/5 stars
Entertainment Weekly	C−
MusicHound Rock: The Essential Album Guide	3/5 stars
Q	4/5 stars
The Rolling Stone Album Guide	3.5/5 stars

Trouser Press wrote that while Harding "brings plenty of talent and originality (especially the lyrics, which are strictly his own style) to this enjoyable and intelligent party, the frequent resemblance to Costello gives what is in fact a fine album a waxy air of familiarity." The Rolling Stone Album Guide considered the album to be marred by "excessive cleverness." Peter Kane in Q described the album as "light-weight Costello... There's still some way to go, but the signs are good."

== Track listing ==
All tracks composed by John Wesley Harding, except where indicated

1. "Movie Theme" Performed by the Morgans Creek String Ensemble - 0:33
2. "The World (And All Its Problems)" - 3:24
3. "Fifty Fifty Split" - 5:22
4. "The People's Drug" - 3:56
5. "The Movie of Your Life" - 6:04
6. "I Can Tell (When You're Telling Lies)" - 3:27
7. "Bridegroom Blues" - 4:23
8. "Save a Little Room for Me" - 4:06
9. "Anonymous 1916" (Anonymous) - 0:58
10. "The Person You Are" - 3:40
11. "Long Dead Gone" - 4:26
12. "The Facts of Life" (Andy Paley, Harding) - 3:15
13. "Driving in the Rain" - 6:06
14. "Backing Out" - 3:07
15. "Crystal Blue Persuasion" (Tommy James, Mike Vale, Eddie Gray) - 5:42
