= Awake (John Wesley Harding album) =

Studio album by John Wesley Harding
- Released: 1998
- Label: Zero Hour
- Producer: John Wesley Harding, Chris Von Sneidern

John Wesley Harding chronology
Dynablob (1996)	Awake (1998)	Dynablob 2 (1998)

Awake is an album by the English musician John Wesley Harding, released in 1998. Harding deemed the sound "gangsta folk." He supported the album with a North American tour that included shows with Steve Wynn.

== Production ==
The album was produced by Harding and Chris Von Sneidern. Harding avoided writing about himself, preferring to tell stories in his songs. He employed tape loops, samples, e-bow, mellotron, and tubular bells on some of the tracks. Awake is a loose concept album, where the songs occur after an alarm clock has buzzed. Kurt Bloch and Scott McCaughey contributed on guitar. Kelly Hogan sang on "It's All My Fault". "Miss Fortune" is about a millionaire who discovers a baby in a trench. "I'm Staying Here (And I'm Not Buying a Gun)" is about resolving differences without firearms. "Your Ghost (Don't Scare Me No More)" is about moving on from an old relationship.

== Critical reception ==
Professional ratings
Review scores
Source	Rating
AllMusic	4/5 stars
Daily Breeze	3/4 stars
Pitchfork	5.5/10

Pitchfork wrote that "too many songs lack any real character and slide slowly into generic lite-rock territory." The Times Union deemed the album "a dazzling, dream-like collection of pop songs culled from Harding's vast and vivid imagination." The Chicago Tribune noted that "much of the record retains Harding's typical techno-free pairing of wry lyrics with fetching melodies."

The San Antonio Express-News called it "a masterful effort, its pointed commentary contrasting with a melodic, folk-rock backing." The Plain Dealer panned the album, writing that "most of the tunes are typical introspective folkie singer-songwriter fare, ranging from the interminable drone of 'Blood Sweat Tears and Come' to the halfhearted country of 'It's All My Fault'." The San Diego Union-Tribune considered Awake "his strongest effort yet, his sparse folk tunes ... combined with a low-fidelity atmosphere more common to bands like Folk Implosion and Pavement."

AllMusic wrote that Harding's "acid-tongued, always-clever phrasing, folky leanings, and strong sense of melody show him to be one of the finest (and unfairly overlooked) songwriters of the '90s."

== Track listing ==
No.	Title	Length
1.	"Good Morning (I Just Woke Up)"
2.	"Your Ghost (Don't Scare Me No More)"
3.	"Window Seat"
4.	"Burn"
5.	"It's All My Fault"
6.	"Sweat Tears Blood and Come"
7.	"Poor Heart"
8.	"Miss Fortune"
9.	"Song I Wrote Myself in the Future"
10.	"Something to Write Home About"
11.	"You're Looking at Me"
12.	"You So&So"
13.	"I'm Staying Here (And I'm Not Buying a Gun)"
14.	"Good Bye (Late O'Clock)"
