= Puppy Dog Pals =

American computer-animated TV series

- Genre: Comedy; Slice of life; Musical
- Created by: Harland Williams
- Voices of: Issac Ryan Brown; Elisha "EJ" Williams; Sam Lavagnino; Gracen Newton; Harland Williams; Jessica DiCicco; Tom Kenny; Shiloh Nelson; Giselle Eisenberg; Cree Summer; Jack Stanton; Bentley Lee Conger; Somali Rose; Amari McCoy; Jayden Theophile
- Theme music composer: Andy Bean
- Opening theme: "Puppy Dog Pals" by Andy Bean
- Ending theme: "Puppy Dog Pals" (Instrumental)
- Composer: Andy Bean
- Country of origin: United States
- Original language: English
- No. of seasons: 5
- No. of episodes: 116 (232 segments) (list of episodes)

Production
- Executive producers: Sean Coyle (seasons 1–4); Richard Marlis; Carmen Italia; Michael Olson (season 5)
- Running time: 22 minutes (11 minutes per segment)
- Production company: Wild Canary Animation

Original release
- Network: Disney Junior
- Release: April 14, 2017 – January 20, 2023

Puppy Dog Pals is an American animated television series created by Harland Williams. The series debuted on Disney Junior in the United States on April 14, 2017.

The series is about Bingo and Rolly, two pug puppy brothers who have fun traveling around their neighborhood and the world when their owner Bob leaves home. They also have a kitty sister named Hissy and a robot dog named A.R.F. (Auto-Doggy Robotic Friend).

== Characters ==
=== Main ===
- Bingo (voiced by Issac Ryan Brown in seasons 1–3, Elisha "EJ" Williams in seasons 4–5) — A blackish grayish pug with a blue lightning collar who is more mature than his twin brother Rolly. He is the leader of Rolly and himself. Bingo is always ready to go on missions with his brother to help someone in need. Brown left the series after season 3 due to puberty. Starting with season 4, Elisha Williams took on the role.
- Rolly (voiced by Sam Lavagnino in seasons 1–3, Gracen Newton in seasons 4–5) — A fawn pug with a red collar with a gold bone on it. He is very silly and isn't as smart as Bingo. He is Bingo's twin birthday brother but Bingo is older than Rolly, as clarified in season 1. Rolly loves to chew on everything he can find and it's a bad habit. Lavagnino left the series after season 3 due to puberty. Starting with season 4, Gracen Newton took on the role.
- Bob (voiced by Harland Williams) — The owner of Bingo, Rolly, Hissy, Olivia and A.R.F. He works as an industrial designer/product designer a.k.a. an "inventor." In the season 2 premiere "A New Pup in Town", Bob modified the fence between his and Chloe's house, so that Keia can play with Bingo, Rolly and Hissy and they can all visit each other's homes without having to dig under the fence and made a new collar for Keia (since her old one fell off), which she wears during missions with Bingo and Rolly. He and Ana get married in the season 4 finale "Bob and Ana's Wedding".
- Hissy (voiced by Jessica DiCicco) — A cynical purple tabby cat wearing a bow, who cares for Bingo and Rolly like a big sister. In some episodes, she ends up going along with Bingo and Rolly on their missions. She, along with Cupcake, is the only one with unnatural fur color.
- A.R.F. (fully known as Auto-Doggy Robotic Friend) (voiced by Tom Kenny) — A robotic dog that Bob invented. He first appears in the episode "A.R.F." and was updated by Bob in "Go Dog Go." He always refers to himself in the third person in every episode with the exception of "Go Dog Go" and "How ARF Got His Voice Back."

=== Supporting ===
- Keia (voiced by Shiloh Nelson) — A new shiba inu puppy owned by Bob's next door neighbors, Chloe and her mother. Keia also becomes close friends with Bingo, Rolly and Hissy ever since she met them. She is also known for wearing a turquoise colored long-sleeved sweater and wearing a pink collar with a gold star on it. She first appeared in "A New Pup in Town". Her best friend is Lollie.
- Lollie (voiced by Giselle Eisenberg) — A black and white cavalier king charles spaniel female puppy wearing a aquamarine collar whose back legs are paralyzed. She first appeared in “Adopt-A-Palooza”. Her best friend is Keia. She becomes Bingo and Rolly's sister at the end of season 4.
- Ana (voiced by Cree Summer) — Lollie's owner and Bob's love interest, later his wife. She runs Puppy Playcare and first appeared in "Adopt-a-Palooza."
- Leo (voiced by Jack Stanton) – An orange tabby kitten wearing a lime green collar, who is Buster's brother and Darius pet kitten. He and Buster are Bingo and Rolly’s cousins, the latter being one of the mission students. He first appeared in "New Pals on the Block"
- Buster (voiced by Bentley Lee Conger) – A brown boxer puppy wearing a fuchsia bandana, who is Leo's brother and Darius pet pup. He and Leo are Bingo and Rolly’s cousins, the former being one of the mission students. He first appeared in "New Pals on the Block".
- Roxy (voiced by Somali Rose) – A sussex spaniel pup, who is Nougat's sister and Grace's pet pup. She is also one of the mission students. She wears a purple collar with flower ponytails on her ears. She first appeared in "New Pals on the Block".
- Nougat (voiced by Amari McCoy) – A piglet, who is Roxy's sister and Grace's pet pig. She is also one of the mission students. She wears a yellow daffodil neck scarf and sometimes put on heart shape shades. She first appeared in "New Pals on the Block".
- Darius (voiced by Jayden Theophile) – Ana's nephew and owner of Buster and Leo, who loves science. His first appearance is in "New Pals on the Block", in which he is living with Bob and Ana while his parents are on a work trip.
- Olivia — A blue fish who is the sister of Bingo, Rolly, Hissy, Lolly and A.R.F. She first appeared in "Fetch that Fish".
- Strawberry (communicates with squeaking noises) — A ladybug who, like Bingo, Rolly and Hissy, is a close friend of Keia's, so much so that Strawberry hangs around with Keia most of the time. Like Keia, she also made her debut in "A New Pup in Town." Keia has given the ladybug the name "Strawberry" because, as stated by Keia, she looks like a strawberry due to her red body with black spots.

=== Recurring ===
- Cupcake (voiced by Jill Talley) — A bitter pink Maltese dog who likes to bully other animals, especially Bingo and Rolly. She becomes more of a friend after "The Fang Fairy".
- Rufus (voiced by Leslie David Baker) — An oafish bulldog who is Cupcake's brother and minion. He has been known to chase Bingo and Rolly multiple times, but in "Haunted Howl-oween", after Rolly removed Chloe's costume off him, he helped them return it.
- Captain Dog (voiced by Patrick Warburton) — The star of the pups' favorite television show.
- Frank Exposition (voiced by Leslie David Baker) — A man who is usually seen vacationing with his wife, Esther, during Bingo and Rolly's missions. In "A Pyramid Scheme," he gets tangled in ribbons, which leads to Bingo and Rolly mistaking him for a mummy.
- Esther Exposition (voiced by Cheri Oteri) — Frank's wife. In episode "Hissy's Big Day", she is shown to have a pet iguana named Iggy.
- Bulworth (voiced by Huey Lewis) — The junkyard dog.
- Dallie (voiced by Tom Kenny) — A Dalmatian who lives in the city's firehouse.
- Tad (voiced by Sean Coyle) — A gopher who lives underground in his tunnels and hangs out with Bingo and Rolly. He speaks in gopher noises that Rolly can understand.
- Jonathan (voiced by Jeff Bennett impersonating Don Knotts) — Bingo and Rolly's wisecracking seagull friend.
- Whaley (voiced by Jessica DiCicco) — An orca whale that Bingo and Rolly helped jump over the other side of the wall and later encountered in ocean-based missions.
- Chloe (voiced by Emma Shannon) — A young girl who is Bob's neighbor. As of Season 2, Chloe and her mother are the owners of Keia, a new puppy who also becomes best friends with Bob's pets.
- Chloe's Mom (voiced by Tara Strong) — As of Season 2, she and Chloe are the owners of Keia, a new puppy who also becomes best friends with Bob's pets.
- Cagey (voiced by Jeff Bennett) — A guinea pig who is Bingo and Rolly’s friend; he initially appears in the pet store window when they pass by and is later Chloe’s pet and Keia’s brother.
- Jackie (voiced by Jill Talley) — An orange collie.
- Bizzy (voiced by Kevin Michael Richardson) — A beaver who lives in the woods and likes to rap.
- Rosetta (voiced by Tress MacNeille) — Bob and Bonnie's mom.
- Strider the Sheepdog (voiced by Mo Collins) — A fast-talking, sheep-herding sheepdog who appears in the episodes "Counting Sheep" and "Rhapsody in Pug."
- Santa Claus (voiced by Henry Winkler) — He gets help from Bingo and Rolly during the holidays and other missions.
- Bonnie (voiced by Grey DeLisle) — Bob's sister, who is an archeologist.
- Hedgie (voiced by Jack McBrayer) — A brown hedgehog who is the pups’ best friend and gives great advice.
- Gilroy Pupkins (voiced by Gary Anthony Williams) – An Alaskan husky who Bingo and Rolly encounter in the park and play care.
- Boss (voiced by Brandon James Cienfuegos) — A young guard dog.
- Sydney (voiced by Kitana Turnbull) — Bulworth's niece.
- Biscotti (voiced by Mo Collins) — A Christmas elf who asks Bingo and Rolly for help from the North Pole.
- Cody (voiced by Duncan Joiner) — A pet beagle who is Bingo and Rolly's cousin from Chicago.
- Auggie (voiced by Spencer Moss) — One of the young pups, introduced in the episode "The New Crew". She is also Mo's sister.
- Mo (voiced by Julian Edwards) — Another one of the young pups, who was introduced in the episode "The New Crew". He is also Auggie's brother.
- Cassie (voiced by Cree Summer) — Ana's mom and Darius grandma.
- Grace (voiced by Rylee Alazraqui) — The new kid in town and the owner of Roxy and Nougat, who befriends Darius and lives right behind Bob and Ana’s house.
- Willie (voiced by David Koechner, credited as Dave Koechner) — A interface robot, who takes care of the Doggy Jojo at Puppy Playcare.

=== Guest ===
- Bob Uecker as Baseball Announcer
- Yvette Nicole Brown as Daisy
- Wendi McLendon-Covey as Mrs. Claus (season 2–3)
- Ernie Hudson as Buddy
- Dennis Haysbert as Crash
- Anna Camp as Donna
- Stephen Tobolowsky as Chip
- Jaime Camil as Hector

== Episodes ==
Season	Segments	Episodes	Originally released	
Season	Segments	Episodes	First released	Last released
1	50	25	April 14, 2017	July 27, 2018
2	60	30	October 12, 2018	October 14, 2019
3	50	25	November 8, 2019	October 15, 2020
4	32	16	October 23, 2020	November 19, 2021
5	40	20	January 14, 2022	January 20, 2023

== Release ==
=== Broadcast ===
When announced, the show had been titled Puppy Dog Tails. The series premiered on Disney Junior and Disney Channel in the United States on April 14, 2017, and on Disney Junior in Canada on April 23. Playtime with Puppy Dog Pals aired to advertise season 2 with the new puppy, Keia. On August 24, 2017, Disney Junior renewed the series for a second season, which premiered on October 12, 2018. On September 7, 2018, a third season was commissioned; it began airing on November 8, 2019. On October 30, 2019, a fourth season was commissioned after it was previously announced in June that the series was being cancelled after three seasons; it began airing on October 23, 2020, with new voice actors for Bingo (Elisha “EJ” Williams, replacing Issac Ryan Brown) and Rolly (Gracen Newton, replacing Sam Lavagnino). On October 9, 2020, a fifth season was commissioned, which began airing on January 14, 2022.

=== Home media ===
Home media is distributed by Walt Disney Studios Home Entertainment.

Region	Title	Episode(s)	Season	Running time	Released	Ref.
1	Going on a Mission!	6	1	183 minutes	April 10, 2018	
1	Playtime with Puppy Dog Pals	6	1	183 minutes	January 22, 2019	
1	Disney Junior Holiday	2	1	143 minutes	October 23, 2018	

== Reception ==
=== Critical response ===
Emily Ashby of Common Sense Media gave the series a grade of three out of five stars, and complimented the presence of positive messages and role models, citing friendship and cooperation. Marisa Lascala of Good Housekeeping included Puppy Dog Pals in their "60 Best Kids' TV Shows and Family Series of All Time" list.

=== Accolades ===
Year	Award	Category	Nominee	Result	Ref.
2018	Daytime Emmy Awards	Outstanding Individual in Animation	Steve C. Meyers	Won	
2018	Daytime Emmy Awards	Outstanding Casting for an Animated Series or Special	Allyson Bosch	Nominated	
2019	Annie Awards	Outstanding Achievement for Editorial in an Animated Television/Broadcast Production	Adam Rickabus	Nominated	
2020	Daytime Emmy Awards	Outstanding Performer in a Preschool Animated Program	Kevin Michael Richardson as King Topher	Nominated	
2020	Daytime Emmy Awards	Outstanding Casting for an Animated Series or Special	Allyson Bosch	Nominated	
2020	Daytime Emmy Awards	Outstanding Sound Editing for a Preschool Animated Program	Puppy Dog Pals	Nominated	
2021	Daytime Emmy Awards	Outstanding Editing for a Preschool Animated Program	Puppy Dog Pals	Nominated	

== In other media ==
=== Live show ===
- In 2023, the characters of Puppy Dog Pals appeared in the touring live action arena show Disney Junior Live On Tour: Costume Palooza.
