= Bad luck =

Bad luck may refer to:

- Harmful, negative, or undesirable luck or fortune

== Film and television ==
- Bad Luck (1960 film), a comedy film directed by Andrzej Munk
- Bad Luck (2015 film), a tragic-comic film directed by Thomas Woschitz
- "Bad Luck" (Grimm), a television episode
- "Bad Luck", an episode of the Indian TV series Dhoom Machaao Dhoom

== Music ==
- Bad Luck, a 2009 album by Trophy Scars
- "Bad Luck" (Harold Melvin & the Blue Notes song), 1975
- "Bad Luck" (Social Distortion song), 1992
- "Bad Luck" (Zach Top song), 2022
- "Bad Luck", a song by Indiana, 2017
- "Bad Luck", a song by Khalid from Free Spirit, 2019
- "Bad Luck", a song by Neko Case from Hell-On, 2018
- "Bad Luck", a song by SL, 2020
- "Bad Luck", a song by the Story So Far from What You Don't See, 2013

== Places ==
- Bad Luck Creek (disambiguation), several streams in the US
- Bad Luck Mountain, in the Adirondack Mountains, New York, US

== Other ==
- Bad Luck, a fictional band in the manga/anime Gravitation
- Bad Luck, a 2016 book by Pseudonymous Bosch

== See also ==
- "Bad Luck Blues", a 1933 song by Dorothea Trowbridge
- List of bad luck signs
- Tough luck (disambiguation)
- Good luck (disambiguation)
- Luck (disambiguation)
- Misfortune (disambiguation)
