= John Wesley Harding (singer) =

- Born: Wesley Stace; 22 October 1965 (age 61); Hastings, East Sussex, England
- Genres: Rock, pop, folk
- Occupations: Singer-songwriter, author
- Instruments: Vocals, guitar
- Label: Sire/Warner Bros. Records Yep Roc Records

Wesley Stace (born 22 October 1965) is an English folk/pop singer-songwriter and author who has used the stage name John Wesley Harding. Under his legal name, he has written four novels. He is also an occasional university teacher and the curator of Wesley Stace's Cabinet of Wonders.

== Early life ==
Stace was born in Hastings, East Sussex, England, the son of educators Christopher Stace and Molly Townson. His mother was also an opera singer and for many years was the director of the Hastings Musical Festival. His sister, Melanie Stace, is a performing artist. His given name, Wesley, comes from John Wesley, the founder of Methodism, who preached one of his last sermons near the town where Harding was born. As a child, he taught himself how to play guitar and eventually started writing his own songs as a teenager, citing John Prine, Loudon Wainwright III, and Bob Dylan as influences. His education included the boarding school St. Andrews School (Pangbourne, Berkshire); Milbourne Lodge (Claygate, Surrey); The King's School Canterbury; and university at Jesus College, Cambridge. He graduated Cambridge with a First in English Literature, but left before completing his PhD in Social and Political Science to pursue a career in music.

== Music and entertainment career ==
Stace began his musical career using the stage name John Wesley Harding, which he took from the 1967 Bob Dylan album John Wesley Harding, for which Dylan misspelled the outlaw John Wesley Hardin's name, adding a final 'g'. He attracted notice after opening a concert for John Hiatt, leading him to sign with Demon Records, who released his critically acclaimed live album It Happened One Night in 1988. The success of the album led to a record deal with Sire Records, with whom he released Here Comes the Groom in 1990. The album featured members of The Attractions, and this association caused critics to frequently compare Stace to Elvis Costello for much of his career. He released The Name Above the Title and Why We Fight for Sire in 1991 and 1992 respectively, but despite critical acclaim and a strong cult following from his engaging live shows, he was not able to find a larger audience, leading Sire to drop him from the label. He continued to release music as John Wesley Harding throughout the 90s and early 2000s on various independent labels, including the song "I'm Wrong About Everything", featured on the soundtrack for the movie High Fidelity. In 1995, he was chosen by Bruce Springsteen as his first opening act in 20 years for his solo shows at the Berkeley Community Theatre in 1995. In the mid 2000s he took a temporary hiatus from music to focus on his burgeoning writing career, returning in 2009 with Who Was Changed And Who Was Dead, a collaboration with The Minus 5. After 2011's The Sound of His Own Voice, he began releasing music under his given name, the most recent being 2021's Late Style.

"John Wesley Harding's Cabinet of Wonders", his series of variety shows, began in Spring 2009 in New York City at (Le) Poisson Rouge, before moving to City Winery, and has included appearances by Rosanne Cash, Graham Parker, Josh Ritter, Rick Moody, Colson Whitehead, Jonathan Ames, A.C. Newman, Rhett Miller, Steven Page, Eugene Mirman, Kristin Hersh, David Gates, John Roderick, Jon Auer, Tanya Donelly, Martha Plimpton, Todd Barry, Steve Almond, and Stephen Elliott. The spring 2010 series featured, among others, Sarah Vowell, Sondre Lerche, Buffalo Tom, Janeane Garofalo, Robbie Fulks, and Paul Muldoon. Artists in the series included Andrew Bird, Tift Merritt, and David Wax Museum. Podcasts of the series can be heard on NPR's "Cabinet of Wonders." and recently on Salon.com. Live shows continue in New York City and across the country.

In 2019 and early 2020, John Wesley Harding (Wesley Stace) toured extensively, performing club dates and intimate house concerts across the United States. A 2020 feature in Yahoo Entertainment described him preparing for a house concert in Columbus, Ohio shortly before pandemic shutdowns, with Harding reflecting on the abrupt halt to touring and his eagerness to return to live performance.

== Writing career ==
In 2005, Stace published his first novel, Misfortune, under his real name, based upon lyrics to his song "Miss Fortune" from his 1998 album Awake. It was nominated for the Guardian First Book Award, and shortlisted for the Commonwealth Writers Prize and the James Tiptree, Jr. Award. Misfortune was also chosen by Amazon.com as one of the Ten Best Novels of 2005, and was one of the Washington Post's Books of the Year. Misfortune, translated as L'infortunée, became a best-seller in France, and has also been translated into many languages including Hebrew, Chinese, and Japanese. The movie rights to "Misfortune" were sold in 2008. His 2005 album Songs of Misfortune comprises songs written for, or appearing in, that book.

His second novel, By George, was published in August 2007; it was one of the New York Public Library's "Books To Remember" of 2007, and Booklist Editor's Choice for books of the year. A third, Charles Jessold, Considered as a Murderer, was published by Jonathan Cape in the UK in July 2010 and Picador in the United States in February 2011, and was one of the Wall Street Journal's Top Ten Books of the Year. Wonderkid, his fourth novel, followed in 2014. He then worked with choreographer Mark Morris on his memoir Out Loud, which was released in 2019.

Stace has reviewed for the Times Literary Supplement, The Wall Street Journal and The New York Times. Other writings include chapbooks for some of his albums, and essays for various music publications, such as Creem and Raygun. His essay "Listerine: The Life and Opinions of Laurence Sterne," published in Post Road No. 5, was nominated for a Pushcart Prize.

== Personal life ==
Stace has lived in the United States since 1991. He currently resides in Philadelphia with his wife Abbey, a visual artist. They have two children, Tilda and Wyn. In addition to his writing and music careers, Stace has also taught college courses about creative writing and songwriting at Swarthmore College, Princeton University, and Fairleigh Dickinson University. He became an American citizen in 2025.

== Discography ==
=== Albums ===
As John Wesley Harding

- It Happened One Night (1988) (live)
- God Made Me Do It: The Christmas EP (1989)
- Here Comes The Groom (1990)
- The Name Above the Title (1991)
- Why We Fight (1992)
- Pett Levels: The Summer EP (1993)
- John Wesley Harding's New Deal (1996)
- Dynablob (studio outtakes, fan club release, later commercially released) (1996)
- Awake (1998)
- Dynablob 2 (live recordings, fan club release, later commercially released) (1998)
- Trad Arr Jones (a tribute to Nic Jones) (1999)
- Dynablob 3: 26 March 1999 (live, fan club release) (1999)
- The Confessions of St. Ace, Mammoth Records (2000)
- The Man With No Shadow (unreleased, later issued as Adam's Apple with slightly different tracks) (many promotional copies exist) (2002)
- Dynablob 4: Swings & Roundabouts (studio, new material, fan club release) (2002)
- Garden of Eden: The Fall EP (EP) (2003)
- Adam's Apple (2004)
- Songs of Misfortune (as the Love Hall Tryst) (2005)
- Who Was Changed And Who Was Dead (with The Minus Five) (2009)
- John Wesley Harding Sings to a Small Guitar, Volumes I & II (previously unreleased demos) (2010)
- The Sound of His Own Voice (2011)
- * The Man With No Shadow (Record Store Day release) (Combines unreleased version with Adam's Apple) (2020)

As Wesley Stace

- Self-Titled (2013)
- Ovid in Exile (2014) (Record Store Day vinyl only release)
- Wesley Stace’s John Wesley Harding (2017)
- Greatest Other People’s Hits (Covers compilation) (2018)
- Late Style (2021)
- Secret Series (new acoustic recordings of his previous albums) (subscription only) (2021–present) 9 releases to date.
- One Last Heist (2026)

=== Singles ===
Year	Title	Chart positions	Album
Year	Title	US Modern Rock	Album
1990	"The Devil in Me"	17	Here Comes the Groom
1991	"The Person You Are"	8	The Name Above the Title
1991	"The People's Drug"	29	The Name Above the Title

=== Contributions ===
- Where the Pyramid Meets the Eye: A Tribute to Roky Erickson (1990) — "If You Have Ghosts"
- 20 More Explosive Fantastic Rockin' Mega Smash Hit Explosions! (1992) – "A Little Bit Country, a Little Bit Rock and Roll" w/ Kelly Hogan
- Live At the Iron Horse Vol. 1 (1997) – "Old Rock N' Roller"
- If I Had a Song: Songs of Pete Seeger Vol. 2 (2001) – "Words, Words, Words"
- Song of America (2007) – "God Save the King"
- Awake, My Soul: The Story of the Sacred Harp (The Original Soundtrack) (2008) "Columbus", (Help Me to Sing)
- Just Say Da (1990) - "When the Beatles Hit America"
- Just Say Roe (1994) - "Right to Choose"
- 30 Days, 30 Songs (2016) - "Mr. Tangerine Man [live]"

== Bibliography ==
- Misfortune (2005) ISBN 0-316-83034-8
- By George (2007) ISBN 0-316-83032-1
- Charles Jessold, Considered As A Murderer (UK – July 2010), (US – Feb 2011) ISBN 0-312-68010-4
- Wonderkid (2014)
- Out Loud (2019) with Mark Morris
