= Irish Luck =

Irish Luck may refer to:

- Irish Luck (1925 film), American silent comedy film directed by Victor Heerman
- Irish Luck (1939 film), American comedy film directed by Howard Bretherton

== See also ==
- Luck of the Irish (disambiguation)
- Irish for Luck, a 1936 British comedy film
