= MF Dow Jones News =

Italian press release service

MF Dow Jones News (MF-DJ), is an Italian press release service, owned by Class Editori in joint venture with Dow Jones. Produces reports for Class Editori, Borsa Italiana, Yahoo! Italia Finance and many others Italian banks and companies.
