= Good Luck (manhwa) =

굿럭 RR: Gut reok MR: Kut rŏk
- Genre: romance
- Author: E-Jin Kang
- Publisher: Daewon C.I.
- English publisher: Tokyopop
- Demographic: sunjung manhwa
- Volumes: 5

Good Luck (Korean: 굿럭) is a manhwa by E-Jin Kang (강이진) published by Daewon C.I. and was licensed in the United States by Tokyopop.

== Characters ==
- Shi-Hyun
- Shi-Woo
- Ma-Hyun

== Volumes ==
No.	Original release date	Original ISBN	English release date	English ISBN
1	August 20, 2002	9788952845894	January 9, 2007	978-1-59816-761-0
2	December 19, 2002	9788952853783	May 8, 2007	978-1-59816-762-7
3	March 19, 2003	9788952856944	September 11, 2007	978-1-59816-763-4
4	June 19, 2003	9788952861832	January 8, 2008	978-1-59816-764-1
5	November 14, 2003	9788952868602	May 13, 2008	978-1-59816-765-8

== Reception ==
"Good Luck is a very grounded, authentic feeling book that takes what seems like standard shoujo story clichés and makes them fresh and new simply by injecting realism into them." — Billy Aguiar, Newtype USA. "Most teenagers can identify with betrayal, love, and the need to put up a false front inside school walls. If it could pick one plot point and work with it, Good Luck would be a much stronger manhwa." — Nadia Oxford, Mania. "It's a refreshing change of pace from what we're used to seeing in the shojo titles we've been offered lately." — A. E. Sparrow, IGN. "Good Luck by E-Jin Kang is a romance and drama manhwa (Korean comics), or better yet, a romantic, teen melodrama." — Leroy Douresseaux, Comic Book Bin.
