= Bad Luck Creek (Texas) =

Stream in Hardin County, Texas, U.S.

Coordinates: 30°26′44″N 94°29′49″W

Bad Luck Creek is a stream in Hardin County, Texas, in the United States.

According to tradition, Bad Luck was so named after a local settler was shot in the crossfire of a skirmish.

== See also ==
- List of rivers of Texas
