= Class CNBC =

- Country: Italy
- Broadcast area: Italy
- Headquarters: Milan, Italy

Programming
- Picture format: 16:9 (1080i, HDTV)

Ownership
- Owner: Class Editori (60%); Mediaset (20%); Versant (20%)
- Key people: Andrea Cabrini

History
- Launched: 14 June 2000; 26 years ago
- Former names: CFN (2000 - April 2001); CFN-CNBC (April 2001 - 2005)

Links
- Website: video.milanofinanza.it

Availability

Streaming media
- Class CNBC: Live Streaming

Class CNBC (formerly CFN/CNBC) is an Italian pay television channel, working as a localised version of CNBC Europe, albeit with a major focus on the Italian financial markets. The channel is headquartered in Milan, site of the Borsa Italiana, and is a joint venture between the publishing house Class Editori, which holds a majority stake, along with Versant (owner of CNBC Europe) and Italy's largest commercial television company Mediaset, which hold 20% of the channel each. The channel broadcasts for sixteen hours per day, covering trading in Europe, Asia and the United States and it has correspondents in other countries, such as at CNBC Europe in London. Class CNBC uses the current on-air graphical look of CNBC Europe, but it has used the same ticker since the launch of the channel. The director is Andrea Cabrini.

== Partnerships ==
CNBC Europe uses the reporters of Class CNBC for its coverage of the Italian markets. In addition, Class CNBC is contracted to provide business news updates for the news bulletins of the Italian networks La7 and Canale 5. Class CNBC is also rebroadcast on Mediolanum Channel, the TV channel owned by Banca Mediolanum.

== See also ==
- ClassTV
