= Misfortune (novel) =

2005 novel by Wesley Stace

- Book Cover
- Author: Wesley Stace
- Language: English
- Genre: Novel
- Publication date: 2005
- Publication place: United States
- Media type: Print (Paperback)

Misfortune, is the 2005 debut novel by Wesley Stace. The "Victorian" novel revolves around a cross-dressing heir/heiress. The book was one of the Washington Post's Books of the Year and chosen by Amazon.com as one of the Ten Best Novels of 2005. It was also nominated for the Guardian First Book Award, and shortlisted for both the Commonwealth Writers Prize and the James Tiptree, Jr. Award. The author, better known as singer-songwriter John Wesley Harding, recorded the traditional ballads and folk songs in the book on The Love Hall Tryst's 2005 album Songs of Misfortune.
