= Italia Oggi =

Italian newspaper

- Front page, 27 December 2008
- Type: Daily newspaper
- Owner: Class Editori
- Publisher: Italia Oggi Editore
- Founded: 1991; 35 years ago
- Political alignment: Liberal conservatism
- Language: Italian
- Headquarters: Milan, Italy
- Circulation: 89,088 (2010)
- ISSN: 1120-6063
- Website: Italia Oggi

Italia Oggi (lit. 'Italy Today') is an Italian political, financial, legal and fiscal daily newspaper, started in 1991. The paper is owned by the financial publishing company Class Editori. The paper was formerly part of the Ferruzzi Group. Italia Oggi Editore is the publisher of the paper, which has its headquarters in Milan.

The paper launched its daily supplement, Marketing Oggi, in 1997.

The circulation of Italia Oggi was 86,934 copies in 2008. The paper had a circulation of 86,892 copies in 2009 and 89,088 copies in 2010.

== Official website ==
- http://www.italiaoggi.it/ (in Italian)
