= Sam Lavagnino =

American voice actor (born 2006)

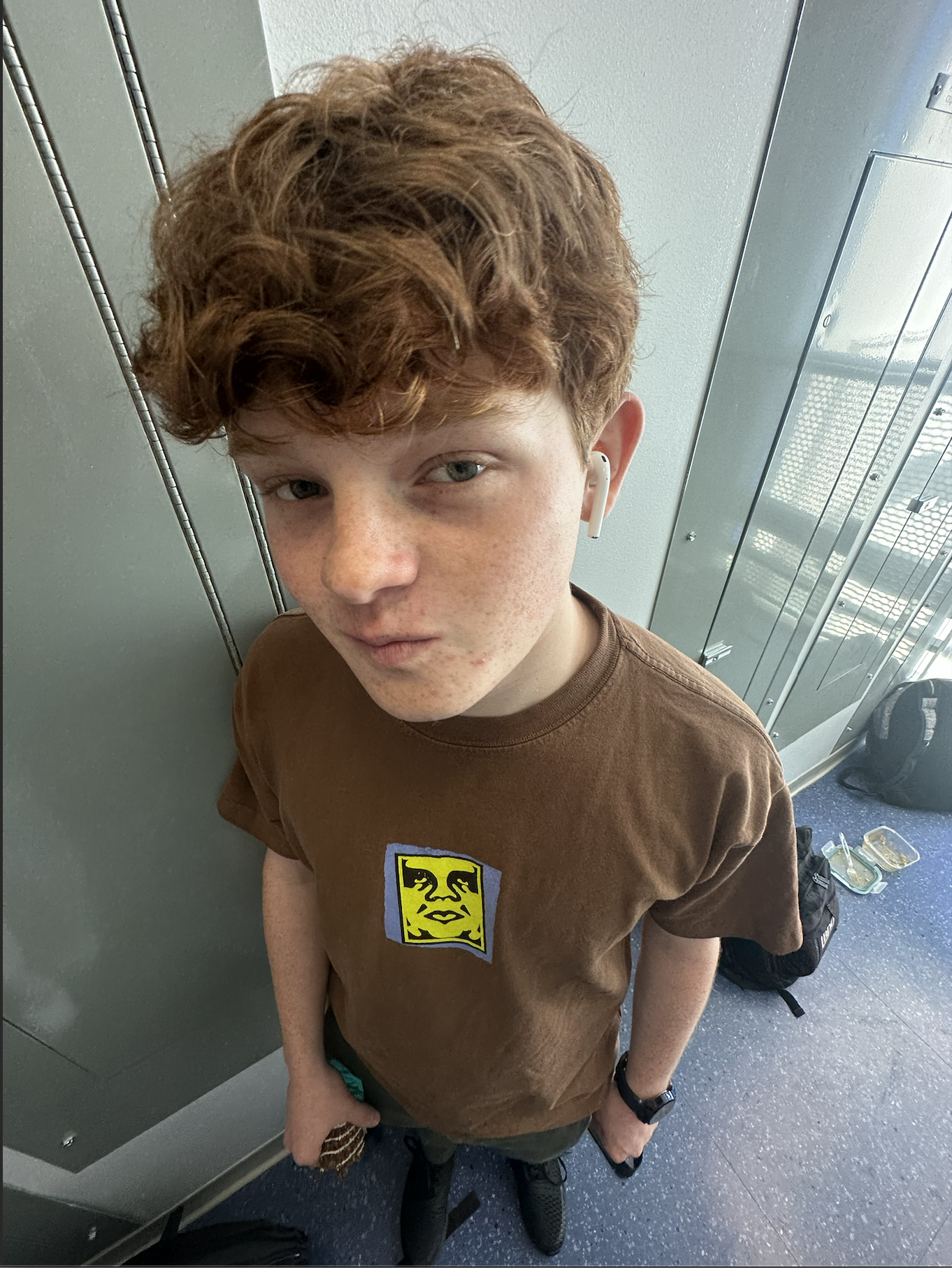
- Lavagnino in 2023
- Born: June 29, 2006 (age 20); Los Angeles, California, U.S.
- Occupation: Actor
- Years active: 2007–present
- Parents: Hope Levy; Tom Lavagnino

Sam Lavagnino (born June 29, 2006) is an American actor and YouTuber. He is best known for his roles as Catbug in Bravest Warriors, young Grizz in We Bare Bears, Rolly in the first three seasons of Puppy Dog Pals, and Mr. Muffin in asdfmovie.

== Life and work ==
Lavagnino is the son of voice actress Hope Levy and screenwriter Tom Lavagnino. At 14 months old, he was on the cover of TIME magazine where he was dressed up as Albert Einstein. He was cast for Bravest Warriors as the role of Catbug, "a creature that’s half-cat, half-ladybug, who’s actually a big draw for the series simply for the random comments he makes and the sound of his voice." The series was broadcast in 2013, and he participated in the Cartoon Hangover panel for Comic-Con 2013 when he was seven years old, as well as an autograph session for Catbug-related comics at Comic-Con 2014. He provided a voice in the trailer for the 2014 film The Boxtrolls. In 2015, he was cast as the voice of the younger version of Grizzly in We Bare Bears. He also voiced the character "Mr. Muffin" in the Asdfmovie series created by TomSka. His first role as a leading character was as the puppy "Rolly" in the Disney Junior show Puppy Dog Pals. He also voices Pepper Corn and the Alien King on Summer Camp Island. He is also the voice of Blodger Blop from the Disney Junior show Miles From Tomorrowland.

== Filmography ==
=== Film, television, and video games ===
Year	Title	Role	Notes	Source
2008	Wonder Pets!	Chucklin Chiania	Television series; voice; episode: "Save the Rooster"	
2013–2018	Bravest Warriors	Catbug	Television series; voice; 30 episodes	
2013–2018	Asdfmovie	Mr. Muffin	Web series; voice; 2 episodes	
2014	Sanjay and Craig	Munchie	Television series; voice; episode: "Flip Flopas"	
2014	The 7D	Eenie	Television series; voice; episode: "New Shoe"	
2014	The Boxtrolls	Additional voices	Feature film; voice	
2014–2019	We Bare Bears	Baby Panda, Boy #1, Baby Grizz, additional voices	Television series; voice; 26 episodes	
2015	The Lion Guard: Return of the Roar	Young Hippo	Television film; voice	
2015	Heroes of the Storm	The Kid	Video game; voice	
2015	The Peanuts Movie	Additional voices	Feature film; voice	
2015	Whisker Haven	Cubbie	Television series; voice; 2 episodes	
2015–2018	Miles From Tomorrowland	Blodger Blop	Television series; voice; 42 episodes	
2016	Animals	Kid #4	Television series; voice; episode: "Turkeys"	
2016	The Mr. Peabody & Sherman Show	Young George Washington	Television series; voice; episode: "Sweet Little Lies/Allan Pinkerton"	
2016	Very Important House	Puppy people	Television film	
2016–2019	Milo Murphy's Law	Young Milo Murphy	Television series; voice; 3 episodes	
2017	The Lion Guard	Additional voices	Television series; voice; episode: "Babysitter Bunga"	
2017	Horizon Zero Dawn	Radiant Itamen	Video game; voice	
2017–2020	Puppy Dog Pals	Rolly	Television series; voice; 80 episodes	
2018–2020	Summer Camp Island	Pepper	Television series; voice; 22 episodes	
2018–2020	Summer Camp Island	King	Television series; voice; 13 episodes	
2018–2020	Summer Camp Island	Additional voices	Television series; voice; 14 episodes	
2018	Big City Greens	Additional voices	Television series; voice; episode: "Swimming Fool/Tilly's Goat"	
2018	The Grinch	Ozzy	Feature film; voice	
2018	"Muffin Time"	Mr. Muffin	Music video; voice; archival recording	
2019	Let's Go Luna!	Leo	Television series; voice; episode: "Guitar to Sitar/Spring Has Not Sprung"	
2019–2022	DreamWorks Dragons: Rescue Riders	Finngard	Television series; voice; 4 episodes	
2020	We Bare Bears: The Movie	Baby Grizz	Television film	
2021	Apple & Onion	Nacho	Television series; voice; 2 episodes	
2021	Words Bubble Up Like Soda Pop	Beaver	Feature film; voice; English-language dubbing	
2022	Alice's Wonderland Bakery	Cam	Television series; voice; 4 episodes	
2022	Horizon Forbidden West	Itamen	Video game; voice	
2022	Minions: The Rise of Gru	Additional voices	Feature film; voice	
2022–2023	Firebuds	Lincoln	Television series; voice; 9 episodes	

=== Other media ===
- Catbug e-book series - Catbug
