= MF Milano Finanza =

Italian economic-financial daily newspaper

MF – Milano Finanza

- Front page, 31 December 2008
- Type: Daily newspaper
- Owner: Class Editori
- Founded: 1989
- Political alignment: Liberal conservatism
- Language: Italian
- Headquarters: Milan, Italy
- Circulation: National
- Sister newspapers: Milano Finanza
- Website: http://www.milanofinanza.it/

MF is an Italian national daily business newspaper owned by Class Editori, founded in 1989. Milano Finanza is an Italian national weekly business newspaper also owned by Class Editori, sold with MF every Saturday since 1986. The newspapers are very popular among the business operators of online trading.
