= Good luck (disambiguation) =

Good luck may refer to:

- Beneficial or desirable luck or fortune
- "Good luck", a parting phrase

== People ==
- Goodluck Jonathan, (born 1957), President of Nigeria
- Goodluck Nanah Opiah, (born 1964), Nigerian, a politician and Speaker of the Imo State House of Assembly
- Goodluck Ole-Medeye (born 1958), Tanzanian politician

== Film and theatre ==
- Good Luck (1923 film) original title, (Ost und West), an Austrian film directed by Ivan Abramson and Sidney M. Goldin
- Good Luck (1935 film) (Bonne chance!), a French film directed by Sacha Guitry
- Good Luck (1996 film), a film starring Gregory Hines
- Good Luck (2000 film), an Indian Tamil film starring Prashanth
- Good Luck!, a 2008 Bollywood film
- Good Luck (play), a play by Ian Hay, basis for the 1926 film The Sporting Lover

== Music ==
=== Performers ===
- GoodLuck (band), a South African electronic music group
- Good Luck (band), an American pop-punk band

=== Albums ===
- Good Luck (Big D and the Kids Table album) or the title song, 1999
- Good Luck (Bladee and Mechatok album), 2020
- Good Luck (Debby Friday album) or the title song, 2023
- Good Luck (My Friend the Chocolate Cake album) or the title song, 1996
- Good Luck (AOA EP) or the title song (see below), 2016
- Good Luck (Beast EP) or the title song (see below), 2014

=== Songs ===
- "Good Luck" (AOA song), 2016
- "Good Luck" (Basement Jaxx song), 2004
- "Good Luck" (Beast song), 2014
- "Good Luck" (Broken Bells song), 2019
- "Good Luck" (Bump of Chicken song), 2012
- "Good Luck", by Abhi the Nomad from Abhi vs the Universe, 2021
- "Good Luck", by Criteria from When We Break, 2005
- "Good Luck", by Daniel Johns from Talk, 2015
- "Good Luck", by Mabel from About Last Night..., 2022
- "Good Luck (To You)", by the Sinceros from The Sound of Sunbathing, 1979

== Other uses ==
- Goodluck, Kentucky
- Good Luck, Maryland, a historical place near Washington, D.C.
- Good Luck!!, a 2003 Japanese TV drama series
- Good Luck (manhwa), a South Korean comic by E-Jin Kang
- Good Luck (football club), a football club of Martinique
- Cordyline fruticosa, also known as good luck plant
- Good Luck (TV series), a 2015 Singaporean TV drama series
- Good Luck (South Korean TV series), a 2025 South Korean TV drama series

== See also ==
- List of lucky symbols
- Luck (disambiguation)
- Lucky (disambiguation)
- Good Lock, a mobile software application
- "Boa Sorte/Good Luck", a 2007 song by Vanessa da Mata, with Ben Harper, from Sim
