= AM Stereo and Digital AM in and near the United States =

== Transmission standards in use ==
1. CAM-D
2. C-QUAM
3. Digital Radio Mondiale
4. HD Radio

== List of stations on shortwave (chronological schedule) ==
None at the moment.

== List of stations on mediumwave ==
kHz	Codec	Callsign	State/ Division	Power (watts)
540	CQUAM	WXYG	Minnesota	850
550	HDAM1	KFYI	Arizona	5000
550	HDAM1	KTSA	Texas	5000
550	HDAM1	WBZS	Rhode Island	1000
560	HDAM1	KLZ	Colorado	5000
560	HDAM1	WHYN	Massachusetts	5000
560	HDAM1	WQAM	Florida	5000
560	HDAM1	WRDT	Michigan	500
570	HDAM1	KLAC	California	5000
570	HDAM1	KLIF	Texas	5000
570	HDAM1	WWRC	Maryland	5000
580	HDAM1	KMJ	California	50000
580	HDAM1	WGAC	Georgia	5000
580	HDAM1	WHP	Pennsylvania	5000
580	HDAM1	WTAG	Massachusetts	5000
590	HDAM1	KQNT	Washington	5000
590	CQUAM	WWLX	Tennessee	600
600	HDAM1	KOGO	California	5000
600	HDAM1	WBOB	Florida	5000
600	HDAM1	WCAO	Maryland	5000
600	HDAM1	WMT	Iowa	5000
600	HDAM1	WREC	Tennessee	5000
610	CQUAM	KCSR	Nebraska	1000
610	HDAM1	KOJM	Montana	1000
610	HDAM1	WFNZ	North Carolina	5000
610	HDAM1	WTEL	Pennsylvania	5000
610	HDAM1	WTVN	Ohio	5000
620	HDAM1	KTAR	Arizona	5000
620	HDAM1	KTNO	Texas	5000
620	HDAM1	WDAE	Florida	10000
620	CQUAM	WKHB	Pennsylvania	5500
620	HDAM1	WTMJ	Wisconsin	50000
630	HDAM1	KHOW	Colorado	5000
630	HDAM1	WPRO	Rhode Island	5000
630	HDAM1	WSBN	District of Columbia (Note: Washington, D.C. is a federal district.)	5000
640	HDAM1	KFI	California	50000
640	HDAM1	KWPN	Oklahoma	5000
640	HDAM1	WOI	Iowa	5000
640	HDAM1	WWJZ	New Jersey	50000
650	HDAM1	KENI	Alaska	50000
650	HDAM1	KSTE	California	21400
650	HDAM3	WSRO	Massachusetts	1500
660	HDAM1	WFAN	New York	50000
670	HDAM1	KBOI	Idaho	50000
670	HDAM1	KDLG	Alaska	10000
670	HDAM1	KLTT	Colorado	50000
670	HDAM1	WSCR	Illinois	50000
680	HDAM1	KKYX	Texas	50000
690	HDAM1	WJOX	Alabama	50000
700	CQUAM	WARB	Alabama	1600
700	HDAM1	WLW	Ohio	50000
710	HDAM1	KSPN	California	50000
710	HDAM1	WOR	New York	50000
720	HDAM1	KOTZ	Alaska	10000
720	HDAM1	WGN	Illinois	50000
720	CQUAM	WJIB	Massachusetts	5000
730	HDAM1	KYYA	Montana	5000
730	CQUAM	WACE	Massachusetts	5000
730	HDAM1	WTNT	Virginia	8000
740	HDAM1	KBRT	California	50000
740	HDAM1	KCBS	California	50000
740	HDAM1	KVOR	Colorado	3300
740	HDAM1	WDGY	Wisconsin	2500
740	HDAM1	WSBR	Florida	2500
750	CQUAM	CKJH	Canada	25000
750	HDAM1	KOAL	Utah	10000
750	HDAM1	WSB	Georgia	50000
760	HDAM1	KDFD	Colorado	50000
760	HDAM1	KTKR	Texas	50000
760	HDAM1	WJR	Michigan	50000
770	HDAM1	KCBI	Texas	10000
770	HDAM1	KCBC	California	50000
770	HDAM1	KCHU	Alaska	9750
770	HDAM1	WABC	New York	50000
770	CQUAM	WLWL	North Carolina	5000
770	HDAM1	WWCN	Florida	10000
780	HDAM1	WBBM	Illinois	42000
790	HDAM1	KABC	California	5000
790	HDAM1	KBME	Texas	5000
790	HDAM1	WPRV	Rhode Island	5000
790	HDAM1	WQXI	Georgia	28000
800	CQUAM	KINY	Alaska	10000
800	HDAM1	WNNW	Massachusetts	3000
810	HDAM1	KGO	California	50000
810	HDAM1	KLVZ	Colorado	2200
810	HDAM1	WGY	New York	50000
820	HDAM1	KUTR	Utah	50000
820	HDAM1	WBAP	Texas	50000
820	HDAM1	WNYC	New York	10000
820	HDAM3	WSHE	Maryland	4300
820	HDAM1	WVSG	Ohio	5000
820	HDAM1	WWBA	Florida	50000
830	HDAM1	KLAA	California	50000
830	HDAM1	KSDP	Alaska	1000
830	HDAM1	WCCO	Minnesota	50000
830	CQUAM	WMMI	Michigan	1000
840	CQUAM	KTIC	Nebraska	5000
840	HDAM1	KXNT	Nevada	50000
840	HDAM1	WHAS	Kentucky	50000
850	HDAM1	KFUO	Missouri	5000
850	HDAM1	KHHO	Washington	10000
850	HDAM1	KOA	Colorado	50000
850	HDAM1	WXJC	Alabama	50000
860	HDAM1	KMVP	Arizona	940
860	HDAM1	KONO	Texas	5000
860	HDAM1	WAEC	Georgia	5000
860	HDAM1	WWDB	Pennsylvania	10000
870	HDAM1	WKAR	Michigan	10000
880	CQUAM	KLRG	Arkansas	50000
880	HDAM1	WHSQ	New York	50000
890	HDAM1	KBBI	Alaska	10000
890	HDAM1	WLS	Illinois	50000
900	CQUAM	WKDA	Tennessee	5000
910	HDAM1	KGME	Arizona	5000
910	HDAM1	KIYU	Alaska	5000
910	HDAM1	KKSF	California	20000
910	HDAM1	KPOF	Colorado	5000
910	HDAM1	KWDZ	Utah	5000
910	HDAM1	WFDF	Michigan	50000
910	HDAM1	WRNL	Virginia	5000
910	HDAM1	WSUI	Iowa	5000
920	HDAM1	KARN	Arkansas	5000
920	HDAM1	WBAA	Indiana	5000
920	CQUAM	WGOL	Alabama	1000
920	HDAM1	WHJJ	Rhode Island	5000
920	HDAM1	WOKY	Wisconsin	5000
930	CQUAM	KKIN	Minnesota	2500
930	HDAM1	KNSA	Alaska	2500
930	HDAM1	WFXJ	Florida	5000
930	HDAM1	WLBL	Wisconsin	5000
930	HDAM1	WPKX	New Hampshire	5000
940	HDAM1	WIPR	Puerto Rico (Note: Puerto Rico is a United States territory.)	10000
940	CQUAM	WYLD	Louisiana	10000
950	HDAM1	KKSE	Colorado	5000
950	HDAM1	XEKAM	Mexico	20000
950	HDAM1	WWJ	Michigan	50000
950	HDAM1	KCAP	Montana	5000
950	CQUAM	WPET	North Carolina	540
950	HDAM1	WKDN	Pennsylvania	43000
950	HDAM1	KPRC	Texas	5000
950	HDAM1	WXGI	Virginia	3900
960	HDAM1	KNEW	California	5000
960	HDAM1	WELI	Connecticut	5000
960	HDAM1	WERC	Alabama	5000
970	HDAM1	KESP	California	1000
970	HDAM1	WFLA	Florida	25000
970	HDAM1	WHA	Wisconsin	5000
970	HDAM1	XEEZ	Mexico	5000
980	HDAM1	KFWB	California	5000
980	HDAM1	WHSR	Florida	5000
980	HDAM1	WOFX	New York	5000
980	HDAM1	WONE	Ohio	5000
980	HDAM1	WTEM	District of Columbia	50000
990	HDAM1	KATD	California	10000
990	HDAM1	WDCX	New York	5000
990	HDAM1	WMYM	Florida	5000
990	HDAM1	WTLN	Florida	50000
1000	HDAM1	KTOK	Oklahoma	5000
1000	HDAM1	WMVP	Illinois	50000
1010	HDAM1	WINS	New York	50000
1010	HDAM1	WOLB	Maryland	1000
1020	HDAM1	KDKA	Pennsylvania	50000
1020	HDAM1	KTNQ	California	50000
1030	CQUAM	KDUN	Oregon	50000
1030	HDAM1	WBZ	Massachusetts	50000
1040	HDAM1	KCBR	Colorado	15000
1040	HDAM1	WHO	Iowa	50000
1050	HDAM1	KTCT	California	50000
1060	HDAM1	KYW	Pennsylvania	50000
1070	HDAM1	KNX	California	50000
1070	HDAM1	WAPI	Alabama	50000
1070	HDAM1	WDIA	Tennessee	50000
1070	HDAM1	WFNI	Indiana	50000
1070	HDAM1	WNCT	North Carolina	10000
1070	HDAM1	WTSO	Wisconsin	10000
1080	HDAM1	KRLD	Texas	50000
1080	CQUAM	KYMO	Missouri	500
1080	CQUAM	WOAP	Michigan	1000
1080	HDAM1	WTIC	Connecticut	50000
1090	HDAM1	KMXA	Colorado	50000
1090	HDAM1	WILD	Massachusetts	4800
1090	CQUAM	WKTE	North Carolina	1000
1100	HDAM1	WTAM	Ohio	50000
1100	HDAM1	WJZA	Georgia	5000
1110	HDAM1	KWVE	California	50000
1110	HDAM1	KFAB	Nebraska	50000
1110	HDAM1	WBT	North Carolina	50000
1120	HDAM1	KMOX	Missouri	50000
1130	HDAM1	KBMR	North Dakota	10000
1130	HDAM1	KTLK	Minnesota	50000
1130	HDAM1	WDFN	Michigan	50000
1130	HDAM1	WISN	Wisconsin	50000
1140	HDAM1	KHTK	California	50000
1140	HDAM1	WRVA	Virginia	50000
1140	HDAM1	WVEL	Illinois	5000
1160	HDAM1	KRDY	Texas	10000
1160	HDAM1	KSL	Utah	50000
1160	HDAM1	KVCE	Texas	35000
1170	HDAM1	KFAQ	Oklahoma	50000
1170	HDAM1	KLOK	California	50000
1170	CQUAM	KYET	Arizona	6000
1170	HDAM1	WWVA	West Virginia	50000
1180	HDAM1	WHAM	New York	50000
1190	HDAM1	KEX	Oregon	50000
1190	HDAM1	KPHN	Missouri	5000
1190	HDAM1	WOWO	Indiana	50000
1200	HDAM1	WCHB	Michigan	50000
1200	HDAM1	WOAI	Texas	50000
1200	HDAM1	WRTO	Illinois	10000
1210	CQUAM	KGYN	Oklahoma	10000
1210	HDAM1	WLRO	Louisiana	10000
1210	HDAM1	WPHT	Pennsylvania	50000
1220	HDAM1	KLDC	Colorado	660
1220	CQUAM	WATX	Connecticut	1000
1220	CQUAM	WSLM	Indiana	5000
1220	HDAM1	WZBK	New Hampshire	1000
1230	HDAM1	KDIX	North Dakota	1000
1230	HDAM1	KOY	Arizona	1000
1230	HDAM1	KSJK	Oregon	1000
1230	CQUAM	WBLQ	Rhode Island	1000
1230	HDAM1	WCWA	Ohio	1000
1230	HDAM1	WECK	New York	1000
1230	HDAM3	WFAS	New York	1000
1230	HDAM1	WJBC	Illinois	1000
1230	HDAM1	WJOI	Virginia	627
1230	CQUAM	WNNC	North Carolina	1000
1230	HDAM1	WTKG	Michigan	1000
1230	HDAM1	WYTS	Ohio	1000
1240	HDAM1	KDSK	New Mexico	1000
1240	CQUAM	KJAA	Arizona	1000
1240	HDAM1	KJCR	Montana	1000
1240	HDAM1	WGTX	Massachusetts	1000
1240	CQUAM	WENK	Tennessee	1000
1240	HDAM1	WHVN	North Carolina	1000
1240	HDAM1	WMMB	Florida	1000
1240	CQUAM	WPAX	Georgia	1000
1240	HDAM1	WTAX	Illinois	1000
1250	HDAM1	KKDZ	Washington	5000
1250	HDAM1	KWSU	Washington	5000
1250	HDAM1	WHNZ	Florida	25000
1250	HDAM1	WPGP	Pennsylvania	5000
1260	HDAM1	WBIX	Massachusetts	5000
1260	HDAM1	WCCR	Ohio	10000
1260	HDAM1	WNDE	Indiana	5000
1260	HDAM1	WSDZ	Illinois	20000
1260	HDAM1	WSUA	Florida	50000
1260	HDAM1	WWVT	Virginia	5000
1260	HDAM1	WYDE	Alabama	5000
1270	HDAM1	KFLC	Texas	50000
1270	HDAM1	WCGC	North Carolina	10000
1270	CAM-D	WKBF	Illinois	5000
1270	HDAM1	WXYT	Michigan	50000
1280	HDAM1	KWSX	California	1000
1280	HDAM1	WADO	New York	50000
1280	HDAM1	WHTK	New York	5000
1290	HDAM1	KCUB	Arizona	1000
1290	CQUAM	KRGE	Texas	5000
1290	HDAM1	WDZY	Virginia	25000
1290	HDAM1	WPVD	Rhode Island	10000
1290	HDAM1	WWTX	Delaware	2500
1300	HDAM1	KAKC	Oklahoma	5000
1300	HDAM1	KCSF	Colorado	5000
1300	CQUAM	WJMO	Ohio	5000
1300	CQUAM	KHTW	Texas	2170
1300	HDAM1	KPMO	California	5000
1300	HDAM1	WAVZ	Connecticut	1000
1300	HDAM1	WRDZ	Illinois	5000
1310	HDAM1	KMKY	California	5000
1310	HDAM1	KTCK	Texas	9000
1310	CQUAM	WEMG	New Jersey	1000
1310	HDAM1	WGSP	North Carolina	1000
1310	HDAM1	WIBA	Wisconsin	5000
1310	CQUAM	WOKR	New York	1000
1310	HDAM1	WTLC	Indiana	5000
1320	CQUAM	KCLI	Oklahoma	1000
1330	CQUAM	KGAK	New Mexico	5000
1330	HDAM1	KJPR	California	1000
1330	HDAM1	KKPZ	Oregon	5000
1340	HDAM1	KCBL	California	1000
1340	HDAM1	KDCO	Colorado	1000
1340	HDAM1	KUOW	Washington	1000
1340	CQUAM	KIKO	Arizona	1000
1340	CQUAM	KXEO	Missouri	960
1340	CQUAM	WBBT	Georgia	1000
1340	HDAM1	WEXL	Michigan	1000
1340	HDAM1	WHAT	Pennsylvania	1000
1340	HDAM1	WIZE	Ohio	1000
1350	HDAM1	WARF	Ohio	5000
1350	HDAM1	WMMV	Florida	1000
1360	HDAM1	WSAI	Ohio	5000
1370	CQUAM	KFRO	Texas	1000
1370	CQUAM	KSUM	Minnesota	1000
1370	HDAM1	WSPD	Ohio	5000
1380	HDAM1	KMUS	Oklahoma	7000
1380	HDAM1	KRKO	Washington	34000
1380	HDAM1	WWMI	Florida	5000
1390	HDAM1	KGNU	Colorado	5000
1390	HDAM1	WGRB	Illinois	5000
1390	HDAM1	WNIO	Ohio	9500
1400	HDAM1	KTUC	Arizona	1000
1400	HDAM1	WCOS	South Carolina	1000
1400	HDAM1	WGIN	Maine	1000
1400	HDAM1	WJLD	Alabama	1000
1400	HDAM1	WWIN	Maryland	500
1430	CQUAM	KALV	Oklahoma	500
1430	HDAM1	KTBZ	Oklahoma	25000
1430	CQUAM	WION	Michigan	4700
1430	HDAM1	WKOX	Massachusetts	5000
1430	HDAM1	WYGI	Tennessee	15000
1430	CQUAM	WRDN	Wisconsin	2000
1440	HDAM1	KFOO	California	1000
1440	CQUAM	KVON	California	5000
1440	HDAM1	KYCR	Minnesota	5000
1450	CQUAM	KBPS	Oregon	1000
1450	HDAM1	KMRY	Iowa	1000
1450	HDAM1	KRZY	New Mexico	1000
1450	HDAM1	KTZR	Arizona	1000
1450	CQUAM	KWHW	Oklahoma	668
1450	HDAM1	WBYU	Louisiana	1000
1450	CQUAM	WCJU	Mississippi	1000
1450	HDAM1	WILM	Delaware	1000
1450	CQUAM	WIOE	Indiana	1000
1450	HDAM1	WOL	District of Columbia	1000
1450	HDAM1	WSDV	Florida	1000
1440	CQUAM	KRRS	California	1000
1460	HDAM1	KXNO	Iowa	5000
1460	HDAM1	WOPG	New York	5000
1460	HDAM1	WTKT	Pennsylvania	5000
1470	HDAM1	KIID	California	5000
1470	HDAM3	WMGG	Florida	2800
1470	HDAM1	WSAN	Pennsylvania	5000
1470	HDAM1	WWNN	Florida	50000
1480	HDAM1	WDAS	Pennsylvania	5000
1480	HDAM1	WGFY	North Carolina	4400
1480	HDAM1	WSLI	Michigan	2000
1480	HDAM1	WKGC	Florida	500
1490	HDAM1	KCFC	Colorado	1000
1490	HDAM1	WBAE	Maine	1000
1490	CQUAM	WIKE	Vermont	1000
1490	HDAM1	WOLF	New York	1000
1490	HDAM1	WPCI	South Carolina	1000
1490	CQUAM	WPCI	South Carolina	1000
1500	HDAM1	WFED	District of Columbia	50000
1510	HDAM1	WLAC	Tennessee	50000
1520	HDAM1	KKXA	Washington	50000
1530	HDAM1	KFBK	California	50000
1530	HDAM1	KQSC	Colorado	15000
1530	HDAM1	WCKY	Ohio	50000
1540	HDAM1	WDCD	New York	50000
1550	HDAM1	WSDK	Connecticut	5000
1560	HDAM1	WFME	New York	50000
1570	HDAM1	KCVR	California	5000
1580	HDAM1	KQFN	Arizona	50000
1580	CAM-D	WSRF	Florida	10000
1580	CQUAM	WZKY	North Carolina	1000
1590	HDAM1	KMIC	Texas	5000
1600	HDAM1	KATZ	Missouri	5000
1600	HDAM1	KEPN	Colorado	5000
1600	CAM-D	KPNP	Minnesota	5000
1600	HDAM1	KXEW	Arizona	1000
1600	HDAM1	WATX	Tennessee	1000
1600	HDAM1	WPOM	Florida	5000
1620	HDAM1	WTAW	Texas	10000
1630	HDAM1	WRDW	Georgia	10000
1640	HDAM1	KPAM	Oregon	10000
1640	HDAM1	WSJP	Wisconsin	10000
1660	CQUAM	KQWB	North Dakota	10000
1660	CQUAM	KSVE	Texas	8500
1690	HDAM1	KDMT	Colorado	10000
1690	HDAM1	WVON	Illinois	10000
1700	HDAM1	KKLF	Texas	10000
1700	HDAM1	WRCR	New York	10000

== External sources ==
1. Topaz Designs
2. DRMRX
3. Meduci
4. FCC
5. Multistandard Mediumwave Receivers
