= KGAK =

- Gallup, New Mexico; United States
- Frequency: 1330 kHz C-QUAM AM stereo
- Branding: "KGAK Radio 1330"

Programming
- Format: Native American

Ownership
- Owner: KRJG, Inc.

History
- First air date: 1946
- Former frequencies: 1230 kHz (1946–1956)

Technical information
- Licensing authority: FCC
- Facility ID: 23050
- Class: B
- Power: 5,000 watts day 1,000 watts night
- Transmitter coordinates: 35°32′34.1″N 108°44′13.3″W
- Translator: (97.1 MHz) K246CY (Gallup)

Links
- Public license information: Public file; LMS
- Webcast: Listen live
- Website: lemon-ocean-08d7caf10.azurestaticapps.net

KGAK (1330 AM) is a radio station broadcasting a Native American format. Licensed to Gallup, New Mexico, United States. The station is currently owned by KRJG, Inc.
