= KHTW =

- Lumberton, Texas; United States
- Broadcast area: Beaumont, Texas; Lumberton, Texas; Golden Triangle
- Frequency: 1300 kHz
- Branding: Freedom 1300

Programming
- Format: Conservative talk
- Affiliations: Premiere Networks

Ownership
- Owner: Carlos Lopez

History
- First air date: December 31, 1959
- Former call signs: KKAS (1959–2000); KSET (2000–2016); KLLS (2016–2019)
- Call sign meaning: H-Town (nickname for Houston)

Technical information
- Licensing authority: FCC
- Facility ID: 31108
- Class: D
- Power: 1,700 watts day; 20 watts night
- Transmitter coordinates: 30°13′56″N 94°12′41″W

Links
- Public license information: Public file; LMS
- Website: freedom1300.com

KHTW (1300 AM) is an American terrestrial radio station licensed to Lumberton, Texas, broadcasting a Conservative talk format. The facility signed on from Silsbee, Texas as KKAS on December 31, 1959. On January 31, 2000, the callsign was changed to KSET. In 2009, it moved to the new tower site in southwest Lumberton.

The station changed its call sign to KHTW on September 7, 2019. Effective November 16, 2019, Carlos Lopez purchased the KHTW facility for $125,527.32. Lopez subsequently relaunched the station as "Tejano 1300".

== History ==
1300 was originally licensed to Hardin County Broadcasting, on December 31, 1959. The call sign assigned to the new station was KKAS and it was licensed to Silsbee, Texas at 500 watts. The KKAS studios were located at the transmitter site which (as the FCC described as) Highway 327, 3 miles west of the center of Silsbee. Eventually KKAS acquired an FM on 101.7, and was sold to Cumulus in 2004 which became KAYD-FM.

=== 2000 ===
On January 31, 2000, KKAS changed its callsign to KSET.

=== 2009 - 2011 ===
KSET's logo as "Freedom 1300"

KSET was moved to Lumberton in 2009. With the construction of a four-tower directional array, KSET was able to become a full market Beaumont–Port Arthur station. Also in 2009, KSET changed format to news talk, and was carrying mostly local talk programming, and only carried "The Dennis Miller Show" from a nationally syndicated program. The station shut down in 2011 due to financial problems. It returned to the air under a Leased Management Agreement (LMA), where another group programmed the station but did not hold the license.

=== 2012 ===
On December 12, 2012, the station returned under new management and began operation as "Freedom 1300", a Conservative news talk station with local content.

=== 2014 ===
Freedom 1300 operated until April 2014, when it went off the air due to failed negotiations between the management company and the owners of the transmitter and tower property.

On May 10, 2014, KSET filed a Special Temporary Authority with the FCC to go silent for one year.

=== 2015 ===
On May 11, 2015, KSET filed with the FCC to resume operations and sign back on the air. Also in May, the pending sale to Southwest Texas Telecom LLC (Chris Boone, WB5ITT - President) was announced. On July 11, KSET returned to the air with music briefly, testing the directional antenna and C-Quam equipment. The test revealed a problem with the stereo exciter and KSET concluded testing. On July 31, testing of the KSET facility resumed, making the final preparations for the station before its targeted mid-late August launch as "Musicradio 1300" carrying the Dallas Cowboys Radio Network. Former WLS DJ and current voice/DJ on WLS-FM, Jeff Davis is the voice of Musicradio 1300. The FCC approved the transfer of control on August 10 and the sale was consummated that afternoon with paperwork filed with the FCC that evening.

On August 11, 2015, the facility purchase was consummated by, and the license transferred to, Southeast Texas Telecom of Beaumont. The new owner changed the programming to a classic Top 40 music format, along with becoming an affiliate of the Dallas Cowboys Radio Network.

=== 2016 ===
On April 8, 2016, KSET went silent due to transmitter damage from lightning. The station changed its call sign to KLLS (a tribute to Chicago radio station WLS as Double-L S) on May 17, 2016. As of June 26, 2016, KLLS returned to the airwaves, broadcasting a classic hits/Top40music format with AM Stereo coming online the next day, branding itself as "Musicradio Double-L S".

=== 2017 ===
On February 17, 2017, KLLS went silent due to antenna array damage. The FCC granted a silent STA while the array was repaired.

=== 2018 ===
KLLS returned to the air briefly on February 11 thru the 14th. Southeast Telecom filed an STA after the facility fell silent again on February 16, citing additional unforeseen damage to the transmission equipment that resulted from Hurricane Harvey. It returned to the air at 5 p.m. CT on November 24, 2018.

=== 2019-2022 ===
It suffered a transmitter failure in early 2019 and again went silent pending repairs. It was sold to the current owner later that year who has flipped it to Tejano music.

=== 2022-present ===
In August 2022, the station flipped back to Classic Hits with little or no IDs/imaging. On June 29, 2023, its programming changed to conservative talk, clearing syndicated shows from Chad Benson, Dan Bongino, Ben Shapiro, Dana Loesch, Mark Levin, and Alex Jones.
