= WSCR (disambiguation) =

WSCR may refer to:

- WSCR (670 AM) is a radio station in Chicago, Illinois.
- WSCR-FM (104.3 FM) is a Chicago radio station that simulcasts WSCR's sports radio format.

WSCR may also refer to:

- WYLL, a radio station (1160 AM) licensed to serve Chicago, Illinois, which held the call sign WSCR from 1997 to 2000
- WCPT (AM), a radio station (820 AM) licensed to serve Chicago, Illinois, which held the call sign WSCR from 1992 to 1997
- WATX (AM), a radio station (1220 AM) licensed to serve Hamden, Connecticut, which held the call sign WSCR from 1982 to 1987
