= WSRF (AM) =

Hatian Creole/French-language radio station in Fort Lauderdale, Florida, United States

- Fort Lauderdale, Florida; United States
- Broadcast area: Miami Dade & Broward County & Palm Beach
- Frequency: 1580 kHz
- Branding: WSRF 1580 & 99.5FM

Programming
- Languages: French Creole; Haitian Creole
- Format: Haitian Creole

Ownership
- Owner: Niche Radio, Inc.; (FCC)
- Sister stations: WAVS 1170AM

History
- First air date: 1955
- Former call signs: WWIL (1955–1967)
- Call sign meaning: W "S-U-R-F"

Technical information
- Licensing authority: FCC
- Facility ID: 67194
- Class: B
- Power: 10,000 watts day 1,500 watts night
- Transmitter coordinates: 26°04′39″N 80°13′03″W
- Translator: 99.5 W258CZ (Melrose Park)

Links
- Public license information: Public file; LMS
- Webcast: Listen Live
- Website: wsrf.com

WSRF (1580 kHz) is an AM radio station broadcasting a full-service/brokered format primarily in Haitian Creole and French. Licensed to Fort Lauderdale, Florida, United States, the station serves the Miami area. The station is owned by Niche Radio, Inc.

WSRF is one of several stations broadcasting its signal using CAM-D, a digital transmission method similar to HD Radio, but compatible with many current analog receivers.

Logo before translator sign on
