= WATX =

Radio station in Hamden, Connecticut, United States

- Hamden, Connecticut; United States
- Broadcast area: Greater New Haven
- Frequency: 1220 kHz (in C-QUAM AM stereo)
- Branding: Connecticut Gold 1220 WATX

Programming
- Language: English
- Format: Oldies
- Affiliations: ABC News Radio

Ownership
- Owner: Clark Smidt; (Clark Media, LLC)

History
- First air date: 1962
- Former call signs: WDEE (1960–1967); WCDQ (1967–1978); WOMN (1978–1981); WSCR (1981–1986); WNNR (1986–1988); WXCT (1988–1996); WQUN (1996–2020)

Technical information
- Licensing authority: FCC
- Facility ID: 42658
- Class: B
- Power: 1,000 watts (day); 305 watts (night)
- Transmitter coordinates: 41°22′38″N 72°55′44″W

Links
- Public license information: Public file; LMS
- Webcast: Listen live
- Website: 1220watx.com

WATX (1220 AM Stereo; "Connecticut Gold") is a radio station licensed to serve Hamden, Connecticut, the station is owned by Clark Smidt, through licensee Clark Media, LLC. It airs an oldies format. Under its previous call sign WQUN, the station aired the adult standards format America's Best Music from Westwood One before going silent on May 31, 2019. The station resumed broadcasting on May 28, 2020, to satisfy FCC requirements and retain the license for another six months until returning to the air with reduced power on May 8, 2021.

== History ==
=== The beginning: WDEE ===
WATX first signed on the air as WDEE. The WDEE call letters were assigned in 1959, and the license to broadcast was awarded in 1960. There was also a license to build an FM sister station, to be known as WDEE-FM. But delays in building both stations ensued, and neither station could get on the air for several years. When WDEE finally began to broadcast, in mid-1962, it had 1,000 watts of power and was only allowed to operate from sunrise to sunset. By 1965, it had become one of the principal Top-40 rockers in the New Haven area. In the early hours of the morning of January 21, 1965, a fire broke out that destroyed the station's studios at 473 Denslow Hill Road in Hamden. The AM station returned to the air within a week, in new premises, but the FM station was unable to return to the air. WDEE-FM remained dark for more than fourteen months, at which time it was sold to new owners, New Haven-based Kops Communication. WDEE's ownership did not change at that time. However, WDEE was sold in June 1967, to Noel Coté, Frank Delfino, and Ted Quale, the owners of Bridgeport radio station, WICC.

=== WDEE becomes WCDQ ===
The station changed format in 1967 from top 40 to "Middle of the Road" (now "adult contemporary music"). With the change in ownership came a change in format, and an accompanying change in call letters: the new call letters were WCDQ, the initials of the station's new owners Cote, Delfino & Quayle. As WCDQ, the station switched to a country music format in the early '70s, then to oldies before returning to top 40 by the mid-1970s. Among the featured programming of the mid-'70s "1220 'CDQ", was "Ken Jordan's Jukebox" hosted by Ken Berger (on-air name of Ken Jordan). The show featured doo-wop and pre-Beatles rock and roll on Sunday afternoons until the station's sign-off at sundown. Other DJs during this era were Jerry Kristafer, Ken DeVoe and Jay McCormick.

=== Woman Radio and "PLR2" ===
In 1978, Robert Herpe, owner of WPLR in New Haven, purchased the station and adopted a format targeted specifically to women. Changing the call letters to WOMN, the new format debuted on August 28, 1978, with the moniker "WOMAN Radio". Although it gained national attention, the new format failed, as it was unable to attract enough advertiser support. Scarcely more than a year after its debut, WOMN dropped the all-woman orientation and switched to a Top 40 format in September 1979, dropping all on-air references to WOMAN radio by February 1980. Later in 1980, the station changed to album-oriented rock, seeking to ride the coattails of its sister FM station WPLR by calling itself "PLR2" on air.

=== 1980s and '90s: from country to Spanish language (and several formats in between) ===
The early 1980s saw another call letter switch, to WSCR, "Suburban Country Radio", in recognition of a new country format. In 1986, Pete Salant bought the station and changed it back to oldies as WNNR, "Winner Radio." Within months, Hartford's WDRC-FM shifted to oldies and forced Hamden's 1220 AM into its next incarnation in 1988, as WXCT ("Exciting 'XCT") with a locally produced adult contemporary format. In 1988 or '89, the station changed format to the Business Radio Network (now the Business Talk Radio Network). Around the spring of 1991, WXCT changed to all Spanish-language programming.

=== Quinnipiac buys 1220 ===
In September 1996, Quinnipiac College acquired the Spanish-language WXCT. The station closed down as the college relocated the station's studios and offices to new facilities at 560 New Road in Hamden. The transmitter site remains at Denslow Hill Road. On February 7, 1997, following five months of silence as construction proceeded, WQUN signed on the air at 6:00 p.m. with the Music Of Your Life network. In January 2019, Quinnipiac announced that WQUN would cease operations at the end of May, citing the AM station's decreasing relevance to the student population. The license and transmitter was offered up for sale shortly thereafter. The station signed off at 6:00 p.m. on May 31, 2019.

On May 27, 2020, the call letters were changed to WATX. The station briefly returned to the air that May and June with National Weather Service forecasts, allowing Quinnipiac to maintain the broadcast license while it sought a buyer for the station. In October 2020, the university agreed to sell WATX to Nashua, New Hampshire-based Clark Media; the company's owner, Clark Smidt, had worked at WDEE during the summer of 1967. The sale was consummated on December 7, 2020.

On May 8, 2021, WATX returned to the air with an oldies format, branded as "Connecticut Gold".
