= In-band adjacent-channel =

IBAC is a method of placing digital communication signals on channels in the existing analog communication bands. While this technique can also be applied to other radio frequency bands, no country has yet done so.

== See also ==
- Digital subchannels
- In-band on-channel (IBOC)
