= KPNP =

Radio station in Watertown, Minnesota, United States (1989–2021)

Watertown, Minnesota; United States
- Broadcast area: Far western suburbs of the Twin cities
- Frequency: 1600 kHz
- Branding: Minority Radio KPNP 1600 AM

Programming
- Language: Hmong
- Format: Defunct (was World Ethnic)

Ownership
- Owner: Self Retire, Inc.

History
- First air date: 1989
- Former call signs: KWOM (1989–2004); KZGX (2004–2007)

Technical information
- Facility ID: 49642
- Class: B
- Power: 5,000 watts day; 300 watts night
- Transmitter coordinates: 44°55′23″N 93°46′56″W

KPNP (1600 AM) was a radio station broadcasting a World Ethnic format. Licensed to Watertown, Minnesota, the station was last owned by Self Retire, Inc. KPNP's studios were located on Brooklyn Boulevard in Minneapolis, while its transmitter was located near Minnetrista.

== History ==
The station officially went on the air on July 5, 1989, under its original call sign, KWOM. Its facilities included a three-tower directional array located near St. Bonifacius. On April 12, 2004, the station changed its call sign to KZGX, then to the final KPNP on September 12, 2007. KPNP once broadcast using the CAM-D system.

ts license was cancelled on April 2, 2021, as its owners did not renew the station's license.
