= CAM-D =

Proposed AM radio format

Compatible Amplitude Modulation - Digital or CAM-D is a hybrid digital radio format for AM broadcasting, proposed by broadcast engineer Leonard R. Kahn.

The system is an in-band on-channel technology that uses the sidebands of any AM radio station. Analog information is still used up to a bandpass of about 7.5 kHz, with standard amplitude modulation. The missing treble information that AM normally lacks is then transmitted digitally beyond this. Audio mixing in the receiver then blends them back together.

Unlike other IBOC technologies like HD Radio, Kahn's apparently does not provide a direct path to all-digital transmissions, nor any multichannel capability. Its advantage, however, is that it takes up far less of the sidebands, thereby causing far less interference to adjacent channels, hence the "Compatible" in the name. Interference has affected HD Radio on AM, along with its (like CAM-D) proprietary nature.

Digital Radio Mondiale, commonly used in shortwave broadcasting, can use less, the same, or more bandwidth as AM, to provide high-quality audio. Digital Radio Mondiale requires digital detection circuitry not present in conventional AM radios to decode programming.

Special CAM-D receivers provide the benefit of better frequency response and a slow auxiliary data channel for display of station ID, programming titles, etc.

== Issues ==
=== Availability of Receivers ===
Receivers that could decode CAM-D were not available to the public, and with Leonard Kahn's death, interest in CAM-D vanished and those stations using it turned it off, not seeing any financial return.

=== Upgradeability of existing transmitters ===
KCI (Kahn Communications, Inc., the company that invented CAM-D) uses as one of its main selling points that some older transmitters are not directly upgradeable to transmit HD Radio. It is true that older transmitters may lack the transmission purity needed to support HD Radio's digital transmission standard, but more recent transmitters are more likely to be capable of upgrading to transmit HD Radio. CAM-D is said to work with a wider variety of existing transmitters, which is a selling point for smaller broadcasters with limited budgets. The price of the CAM-D hardware is $65,600 as of July 1, 2007.

=== Technical aspects and differences with other digital radio methods ===
Nowadays, this standard faces competition with some other stereophonic standards on AM.

CAM-D is said to add high-frequency program information digitally transmitted and then overlaid onto the existing low- to mid-frequency analog program. This provides enhanced fidelity that under adequate analog signal conditions may allow AM stations to transmit music and other program content with a more lifelike sound.

A significant disparity between Ibiquity's AM HD Radio and CAM-D is that of time diversity. Namely, HD Radio's AM broadcast scheme broadcasts two copies of the program offset by a few seconds, allowing signal to be briefly lost and maintain uninterrupted program audio (for example, driving under an overpass, multipath in urban areas, lightning, switching transients, etc.).. However, in the field, HD Radio, at a distance from the transmitter, is still not immune to the aspects of the AM dial such as those below.

A substantial problem of analog AM transmission is that it is subject to poor signal-to-noise ratio due to radio frequency noise from man-made and natural sources, such as fluorescent lamps, motors, switches and lightning. Simply adding high frequency information does not produce high fidelity. HD Radio signals on AM, however, use more bandwidth signal wise and often create "hash" on surrounding frequencies, up to 30 kHz from the center frequency. This interference, which is audible mainly on analog radios, was one of the reasons Citadel Communications pulled night broadcasts of their AM HD station's signals. CAM-D does not produce interference on any channels 10 kHz or more from the center frequency.

CAM-D is a system that is applicable to medium wave and possibly shortwave transmission. Since receivers are designed for multiple bands, a receiver that requires a substantially different architecture for CAM-D will require special circuitry that will increase its cost. This is similar to HD Radio and other digital radio services. Since they all require new circuitry, inevitably, the price of manufacture will increase. This price will likely begin to decrease once the technology becomes proven. Since all new broadcast radios are moving to full digital formats that decode with nearly identical hardware (XM, Sirius, HD Radio (in digital mode), Digital Audio Broadcasting, Digital Radio Mondiale) in the long term, the overhead of analog circuitry will cause a cost penalty to implement the technology in future radios.

== Stations broadcasting in CAM-D ==
- WSRF, 1580 AM, Fort Lauderdale, Florida
- WKBF, 1270 AM, Rock Island, Illinois, decommissioned June 1, 2020
- KPNP, 1600 AM, Minneapolis, Minnesota, decommissioned April 2, 2021
