= Leonard R. Kahn =

Leonard Richard Kahn (June 16, 1926 Manhattan, New York – June 3, 2012) was an electrical engineer, who invented technology for AM broadcasting.

== Career ==
Kahn held over 100 patents. He was primarily known for advocating several technologies designed to improve the sound quality of AM radio. His Kahn-Hazeltine system was the chief competitor to Motorola's C-Quam AM Stereo system. More than 100 stations used his stereo system before Motorola's system ultimately won out as the AM Stereo standard. Later, a part of that system was used to develop the CAM-D AM digital broadcasting technology. His other notable inventions include maximum ratio combining used in multiple output systems. Leonard also developed the Symmetra Peak for AM radio which was used to equalize the negative and positive modulation peaks prior to the F.C.C. permitting asymmetrical modulation. Another one of Leonard's developments was a system called the Voice Line. It was a combination 4 input remote mixer and studio decoder. The system modulated a carrier at approximately 3 kHz. with the low frequency components 50 Hz-250 Hz at the remote site then demodulated the 3 kHz carrier at the studio end. This was then combined with the telephone quality audio and produced a much more natural sounding broadcast ranging from 50 Hz to as high as the telephone line would permit with the exception of the sharp notch at 3 kHz to filter out the carrier.

== AM stereo ==
The Kahn-Hazeltine system of AM stereo was tested and used in Mexico long before the F.C.C. permitted stereo in the United States. This system used the dual sidebands that are produced by all AM stations to transmit the left channel information on the lower sideband and the right channel on the upper sideband. Monophonic radios when tuned to the center of the carrier heard both, thus a monophonic signal. Two monophonic radios could be tuned, one above the carrier and one below to produce stereo reception. Later, the Kahn stereo systems were used as what Leonard called the "Power Side". The power side was used to emphasize the audio on one of the two sidebands for stations that suffered from first adjacent channel interference, for example a station on 1240 suffering from interference on 1250 could load more audio on the lower sideband to force people to tune towards the 1230 sideband. The system was short-lived however due to the adoption of digital tuned radios that made it impossible to tune off the center of the channel. This method of decoding stereo was also similarly affected.

== See also ==
- AM stereo
- CAM-D
