= C-QUAM =

Method of broadcasting stereo AM radio

C-QUAM (Compatible QUadrature Amplitude Modulation) is the method of AM stereo broadcasting used in Canada, the United States and most other countries. It was invented in 1977 by Norman Parker, Francis Hilbert, and Yoshio Sakaie, and published in an IEEE journal.

Using circuitry developed by Motorola, C-QUAM uses quadrature amplitude modulation (QAM) to encode the stereo separation signal. This extra signal is then stripped down in such a way that it is compatible with the envelope detector of older receivers, hence the name C-QUAM for Compatible. A 25 Hz pilot tone is added to trigger receivers; unlike its counterpart in FM radio, this carrier is not necessary for the reconstruction of the original audio sources.

== Description ==
The C-QUAM signal is composed of two distinct modulation stages: a conventional AM version and a compatible quadrature PM version.

Stage 1 provides the transmitter with a summed L+R mono audio input. This input is precisely the same as conventional AM-Mono transmission methods and ensures 100% compatibility with conventional 'envelope detector' receivers.

Stage 2 provides the stereo multiplexed (muxed) audio input and replaces the conventional crystal oscillator stage of otherwise AM-Mono transmitters. So as to not create interference with 'envelope detector' receivers, the stage 2 signal takes the multiplexed (muxed) audio signals and phase modulates both, using a divide-by-4 Johnson counter and two balanced modulators operating 90 degrees out of phase with each other. Stage 2 is not amplitude modulated, it is phase modulated, and is made up of both a L+R input and a L-R input.

To recover the 'stereo' audio signals, a synchronous detector extracts the L-R audio from the phase modulated quadrature portion of the signal created in stage 2. The L+R audio can be extracted from either the AM (stage 1) or the PM (stage 2) modulation component. From there, the audio can be readily de-multiplexed (de-muxed) back to 'stereo', a.k.a. Left and Right channels.

== Known problems ==
C-QUAM is not perfect, however, in large part because pre-AMAX it exhibited platform motion, with the audio "center" rocking back and forth as if changing the balance knob. This effect is potentially bothersome, especially in a moving vehicle where the received signal changes rapidly, and occupants (particularly the driver) would be more prone to its effects (this was an effect that happened primarily with skywave signals. Groundwave or local coverage usually did not suffer from this issue). This has been alleviated in subsequent revisions. Also, since some stereo information is contained in the sidebands, adjacent channel interference can cause problems. Finally, when only part of a sideband is attenuated (as often happens to skywave signals reflecting off the ionosphere), an effect known as selective fading, very unpleasant effects result; hence, the C-QUAM system is not often if ever used for shortwave broadcasting, nor by stations which receive a great deal of skywave interference.

== User base ==
Nowadays, this standard faces fierce competition with some other stereophonic standards on AM.

As of March 2014, there are still a number of AM radio stations in North America broadcasting in C-QUAM stereo. Among those stations are WXYG/540: Sauk Rapids, MN; CFCB/570: Corner Brook, NL; CFCO/630: Chatham, Ontario (covering SW Ontario, Eastern Michigan and Northern Ohio); WNMB/900: North Myrtle Beach, South Carolina; WBLQ/1230: Westerly, Rhode Island; WIRY/1340: Plattsburgh, New York; WAXB/850: Ridgefield, Connecticut and WYLD-AM/940: New Orleans, Louisiana. In addition to FCC-Licensed C-QUAM AM broadcast stations, low-powered (<100 mW) Part 15 C-QUAM stereo transmitters are available for sale for use in the United States. In Rome, Italy, there is Broadcastitalia on 1485 kHz.

Also see:

- AM Stereo radio stations in the United States
- AM Stereo radio stations worldwide

== Competition from IBOC Hybrid Digital Systems ==
While C-QUAM is an accepted international standard for AM Radio broadcasting, it is incompatible with the IBOC (In-band on-channel) "HD" (Hybrid Digital) radio system, so a broadcaster must choose what system they will use. The IBOC system allows transmission of an audio frequency range extending to approximately 15 kHz, 2-ch Stereo on the AM band, but with significant digital artifact and aliasing due to substantial codec inadequacy.

In addition, C-QUAM patents have expired. iBiquity still controls IBOC intellectual property through patents, through licensing fees for both the use of the technology, and any modifications to be made, even if the broadcaster in question has purchased the equipment outright and made costly modifications to their transmitter plant in order to implement it.

Very few AM radio stations that broadcast with IBOC HD Radio during the day switch to C-QUAM AM Stereo during nighttime operation to reduce sideband digital (hash) interference and to provide long-range stereo reception. A number of HD radio tuners have the limited ability to decode C-Quam stereo transmissions, (typically with lower bandwidth), and as a result, reduced audio quality than what could be expected from a specifically designed AMAX/C-QUAM only tuner. C-QUAM AM Stereo transmissions have the same range as AM Monural transmission, a key benefit.

Whereas many stations in the late 2000s changed from C-QUAM to HD Radio, in the 2010s the trend reversed with many HD Radio stations shutting off their digital equipment. However, few of these stations returned to C-QUAM broadcasts.

== See also ==
- List of AM stereo radio stations
