= AM broadcasting =

Radio broadcasting using amplitude modulation

- Amplitude modulation
- AM and FM modulated signals for radio. amplitude modulation (AM) and frequency modulation (FM) are types of modulation (coding). The electrical signal from program material, usually coming from a studio, is mixed with a carrier wave of a specific frequency, then broadcast. In the case of AM, this mixing (modulation) is done by altering the amplitude (strength) of the carrier wave, proportional to the original signal. In contrast, in the case of FM, it is the carrier wave's frequency that is varied. A radio receiver contains a demodulator that extracts the original program material from the broadcast wave.
- Abbreviation: AM
- Status: Active
- Year started: 1901; 125 years ago
- Authors: Reginald Fessenden
- License: Public
- Website: www.fcc.gov/general/am-radio

AM broadcasting is radio broadcasting using amplitude modulation (AM) transmissions. It was the first method developed for making audio radio transmissions, and is still used worldwide, primarily for medium wave (also known as "AM band") transmissions, but also on the longwave and shortwave radio bands.

The earliest experimental AM transmissions began in the early 1900s. However, widespread AM broadcasting was not established until the 1920s, following the development of vacuum tube receivers and transmitters. AM radio remained the dominant method of broadcasting for the next 30 years, a period called the "Golden Age of Radio", until television broadcasting became widespread in the 1950s and received much of the programming previously carried by radio. Later, AM radio's audiences declined greatly due to competition from FM radio, digital radio, satellite radio, Internet radio, music streaming services, and podcasting.

Compared to FM or digital transmissions, AM transmissions are more expensive to transmit due to the necessity of having to transmit a high power carrier wave to overcome ground losses, and the large antenna radiators required at the low broadcast frequencies, but can be sent over long distances via the ionosphere at night; however, they are much more susceptible to interference, and often have lower audio fidelity. Thus, AM broadcasters tend to specialize in spoken-word formats, such as talk radio, all-news radio and sports radio, with music formats primarily for FM and digital stations.

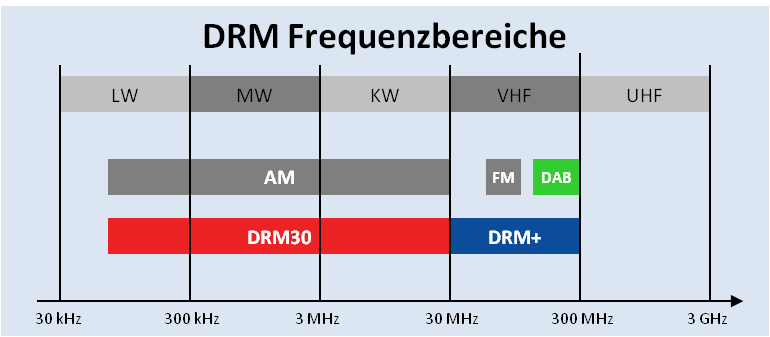
Main radio bands

== History ==
People who weren't around in the 20s when radio exploded can't know what it meant, this milestone for mankind. Suddenly, with radio, there was instant human communication. No longer were our homes isolated and lonely and silent. The world came into our homes for the first time. Music came pouring in. Laughter came in. News came in. The world shrank, with radio.

— Red Barber, The Broadcasters, 1970, pp. 11–12.

=== Early broadcasting development ===
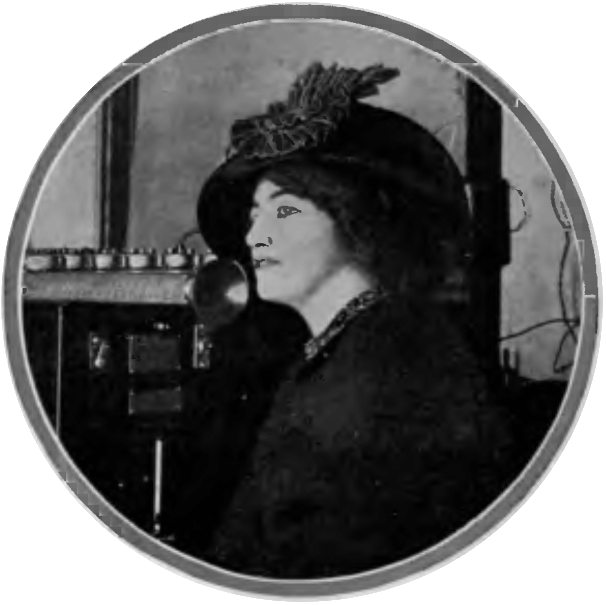
One of the earliest radio broadcasts, French soprano Mariette Mazarin singing into Lee de Forest's arc transmitter in New York City on February 24, 1910.

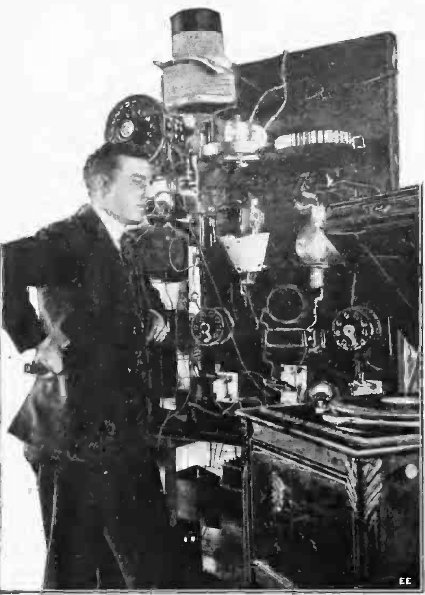
Lee de Forest used an early vacuum-tube transmitter to broadcast returns for the Hughes-Wilson presidential election returns on November 7, 1916, over 2XG in New York City. Pictured is engineer Charles Logwood.

The idea of broadcasting—the unrestricted transmission of signals to a widespread audience—dates back to the founding period of radio development, even though the earliest radio transmissions, originally known as "Hertzian radiation" and "wireless telegraphy", used spark-gap transmitters that could only transmit the dots and dashes of Morse code. In October 1898, a London publication, The Electrician, noted that "there are rare cases where, as Dr. [Oliver] Lodge once expressed it, it might be advantageous to 'shout' the message, spreading it broadcast to receivers in all directions". However, it was recognized that this would involve significant financial issues, as that same year The Electrician also commented "did not Prof. Lodge forget that no one wants to pay for shouting to the world on a system by which it would be impossible to prevent non-subscribers from benefiting gratuitously?"

On January 1, 1902, Nathan Stubblefield gave a short-range "wireless telephone" demonstration, that included simultaneously broadcasting speech and music to seven locations throughout Murray, Kentucky. However, this was transmitted using induction rather than radio signals, and although Stubblefield predicted that his system would be perfected so that "it will be possible to communicate with hundreds of homes at the same time", and "a single message can be sent from a central station to all parts of the United States", he was unable to overcome the inherent distance limitations of this technology.

The earliest public radiotelegraph broadcasts were provided as government services, beginning with daily time signals inaugurated on January 1, 1905, by a number of U.S. Navy stations. In Europe, signals transmitted from a station located on the Eiffel Tower were received throughout much of Europe. In both the United States and France this led to a small market of receiver lines geared for jewelers who needed accurate time to set their clocks, including the Ondophone in France, and the De Forest RS-100 Jewelers Time Receiver in the United States. The ability to pick up time signal broadcasts, in addition to Morse code weather reports and news summaries, also attracted the interest of amateur radio enthusiasts.

=== Early amplitude modulation (AM) transmitter technologies ===
It was immediately recognized that, much like the telegraph had preceded the invention of the telephone, the ability to make audio radio transmissions would be a significant technical advance. Despite this knowledge, it still took two decades to perfect the technology needed to make quality audio transmissions. In addition, the telephone had rarely been used for distributing entertainment, outside of a few "telephone newspaper" systems, most of which were established in Europe, beginning with the Paris Théâtrophone. With this in mind, most early radiotelephone development envisioned that the device would be more profitably developed as a "wireless telephone" for personal communication, or for providing links where regular telephone lines could not be run, rather than for the uncertain finances of broadcasting.

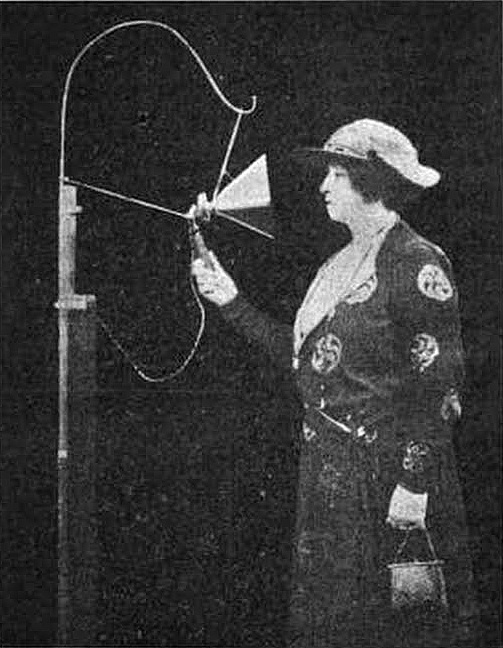
Nellie Melba making a broadcast over the Marconi Chelmsford Works radio station in England on June 15, 1920.

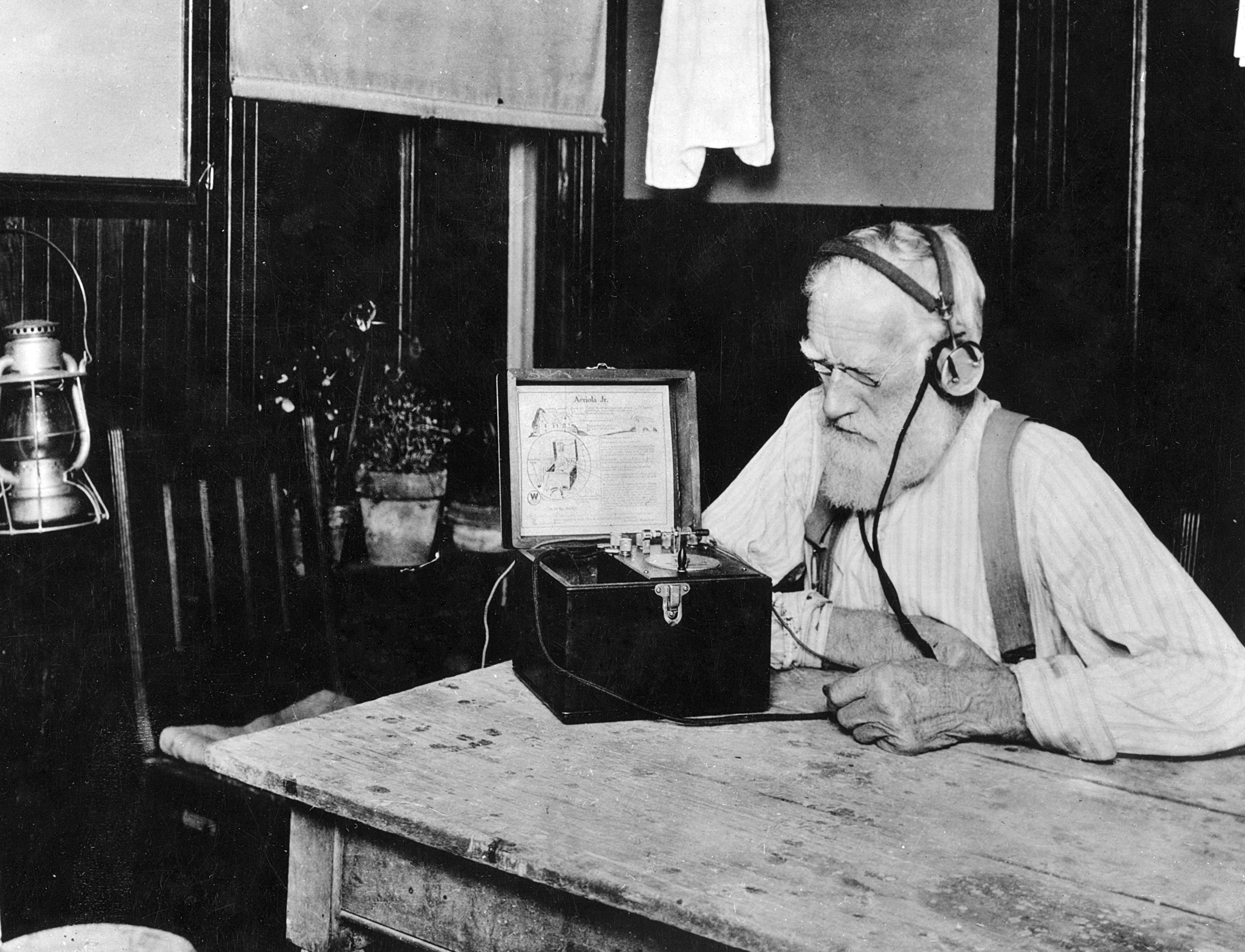
Farmer listening to U.S. government weather and crop reports using a crystal radio in 1923. Public service government time, weather, and farm broadcasts were the first radio "broadcasts".

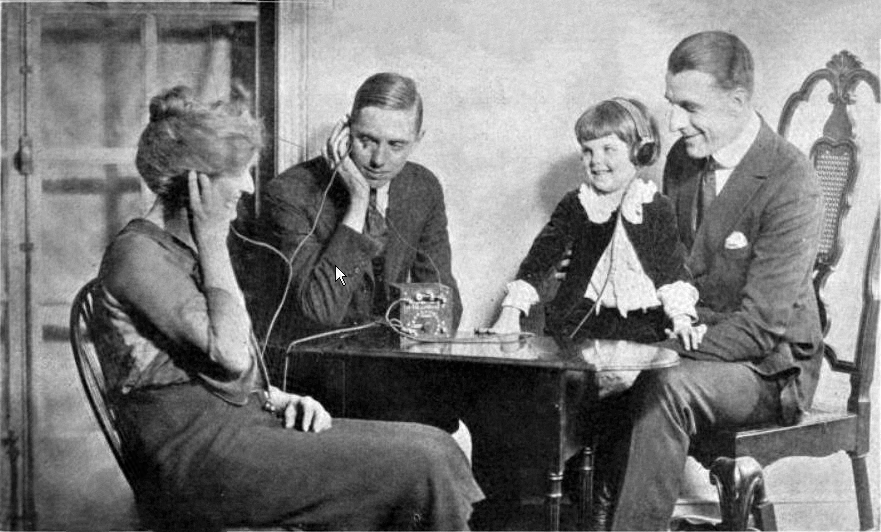
A family listening to an early broadcast using a crystal radio receiver in 1922. Crystal sets, used before the advent of vacuum tube radios in the 1920s, could not drive loudspeakers, so the family had to listen on earphones.

The person generally credited as the primary early developer of AM technology is Canadian-born inventor Reginald Fessenden. The original spark-gap radio transmitters were impractical for transmitting audio, since they produced discontinuous pulses known as "damped waves". Fessenden realized that what was needed was a new type of radio transmitter that produced steady "undamped" (better known as "continuous wave") signals, which could then be "modulated" to reflect the sounds being transmitted.

Fessenden's basic approach was disclosed in U.S. Patent 706,737, which he applied for on May 29, 1901, and was issued the next year. It called for the use of a high-speed alternator (referred to as "an alternating-current dynamo") that generated "pure sine waves" and produced "a continuous train of radiant waves of substantially uniform strength", or, in modern terminology, a continuous-wave (CW) transmitter. Fessenden began his research on audio transmissions while doing developmental work for the United States Weather Service on Cobb Island, Maryland. Because he did not yet have a continuous-wave transmitter, initially he worked with an experimental "high-frequency spark" transmitter, taking advantage of the fact that the higher the spark rate, the closer a spark-gap transmission comes to producing continuous waves. He later reported that, in the fall of 1900, he successfully transmitted speech over a distance of about 1.6 kilometers (one mile), which appears to have been the first successful audio transmission using radio signals. However, at this time the sound was far too distorted to be commercially practical. For a time he continued working with more sophisticated high-frequency spark transmitters, including versions that used compressed air, which began to take on some of the characteristics of arc-transmitters. Fessenden attempted to sell this form of radiotelephone for point-to-point communication, but was unsuccessful.

==== Alternator transmitter ====
Fessenden's work with high-frequency spark transmissions was only a temporary measure. His ultimate plan for creating an audio-capable transmitter was to redesign an electrical alternator, which normally produced alternating current of at most a few hundred Hz, to increase its rotational speed and so generate currents of tens-of-thousands Hz, thus producing a steady continuous-wave transmission when connected to an aerial. The next step, adopted from standard wire-telephone practice, was to insert a simple carbon microphone into the transmission line, to modulate the carrier wave signal to produce AM audio transmissions. However, it would take many years of expensive development before even a prototype alternator-transmitter would be ready, and a few years beyond that for high-power versions to become available.

Fessenden worked with General Electric's (GE) Ernst F. W. Alexanderson, who in August 1906, delivered an improved model which operated at a transmitting frequency of approximately 50 kHz, although at low power. The alternator-transmitter achieved the goal of transmitting quality audio signals, but the lack of any way to amplify the signals meant they were somewhat weak. On December 21, 1906, Fessenden made an extensive demonstration of the new alternator-transmitter at Brant Rock, Massachusetts, showing its utility for point-to-point wireless telephony, including interconnecting his stations to the wire telephone network. As part of the demonstration, speech was transmitted 18 kilometers (11 miles) to a listening site at Plymouth, Massachusetts.

An American Telephone Journal account of the December 21 alternator-transmitter demonstration included the statement that "It is admirably adapted to the transmission of news, music, etc. as, owing to the fact that no wires are needed, simultaneous transmission to many subscribers can be effected as easily as to a few", echoing the words of a handout distributed to the demonstration witnesses, which stated "[Radio] Telephony is admirably adapted for transmitting news, stock quotations, music, race reports, etc. simultaneously over a city, on account of the fact that no wires are needed and a single apparatus can distribute to 10,000 subscribers as easily as to a few. It is proposed to erect stations for this purpose in the large cities here and abroad." However, other than two holiday transmissions reportedly made shortly after these demonstrations, Fessenden does not appear to have conducted any radio broadcasts for the general public, or to have even given additional thought about the potential of a regular broadcast service, and in a 1908 article providing a comprehensive review of the potential uses for his radiotelephone invention, he made no references to broadcasting.

Because there was no way to amplify electrical currents at this time, modulation was usually accomplished by a carbon microphone inserted directly in the antenna wire. This meant that the full transmitter power flowed through the microphone, and even using water cooling, the power handling ability of the microphones severely limited the power of the transmissions. Ultimately only a small number of large and powerful Alexanderson alternators would be developed. However, they would be almost exclusively used for long-range radiotelegraph communication, and occasionally for radiotelephone experimentation, but were never used for general broadcasting.

==== Arc transmitters ====
Almost all of the continuous wave AM transmissions made prior to 1915 were made by versions of the arc converter transmitter, which had been initially developed by Valdemar Poulsen in 1903. Arc transmitters worked by producing a pulsating electrical arc in an enclosed hydrogen atmosphere. They were much more compact than alternator transmitters, and could operate on somewhat higher transmitting frequencies. However, they suffered from some of the same deficiencies. The lack of any means to amplify electrical currents meant that, like the alternator transmitters, modulation was usually accomplished by a microphone inserted directly in the antenna wire, which again resulted in overheating issues, even with the use of water-cooled microphones. Thus, transmitter powers tended to be limited. The arc was also somewhat unstable, which reduced audio quality. Experimenters who used arc transmitters for their radiotelephone research included Ernst Ruhmer, Quirino Majorana, Charles "Doc" Herrold, and Lee de Forest.

==== Vacuum tube transmitters ====
Advances in vacuum tube technology (called "valves" in British usage), especially after around 1915, revolutionized radio technology. Vacuum tube devices could be used to amplify electrical currents, which overcame the overheating issues of needing to insert microphones directly in the transmission antenna circuit. Vacuum tube transmitters also provided high-quality AM signals, and could operate on higher transmitting frequencies than alternator and arc transmitters. Non-governmental radio transmissions were prohibited in many countries during World War I, but AM radiotelephony technology advanced greatly due to wartime research, and after the war the availability of tubes sparked a great increase in the number of amateur radio stations experimenting with AM transmission of news or music. Vacuum tubes remained the central technology of radio for 40 years, until transistors began to dominate in the late 1950s, and are still used in the highest power broadcast transmitters.

=== Receivers ===
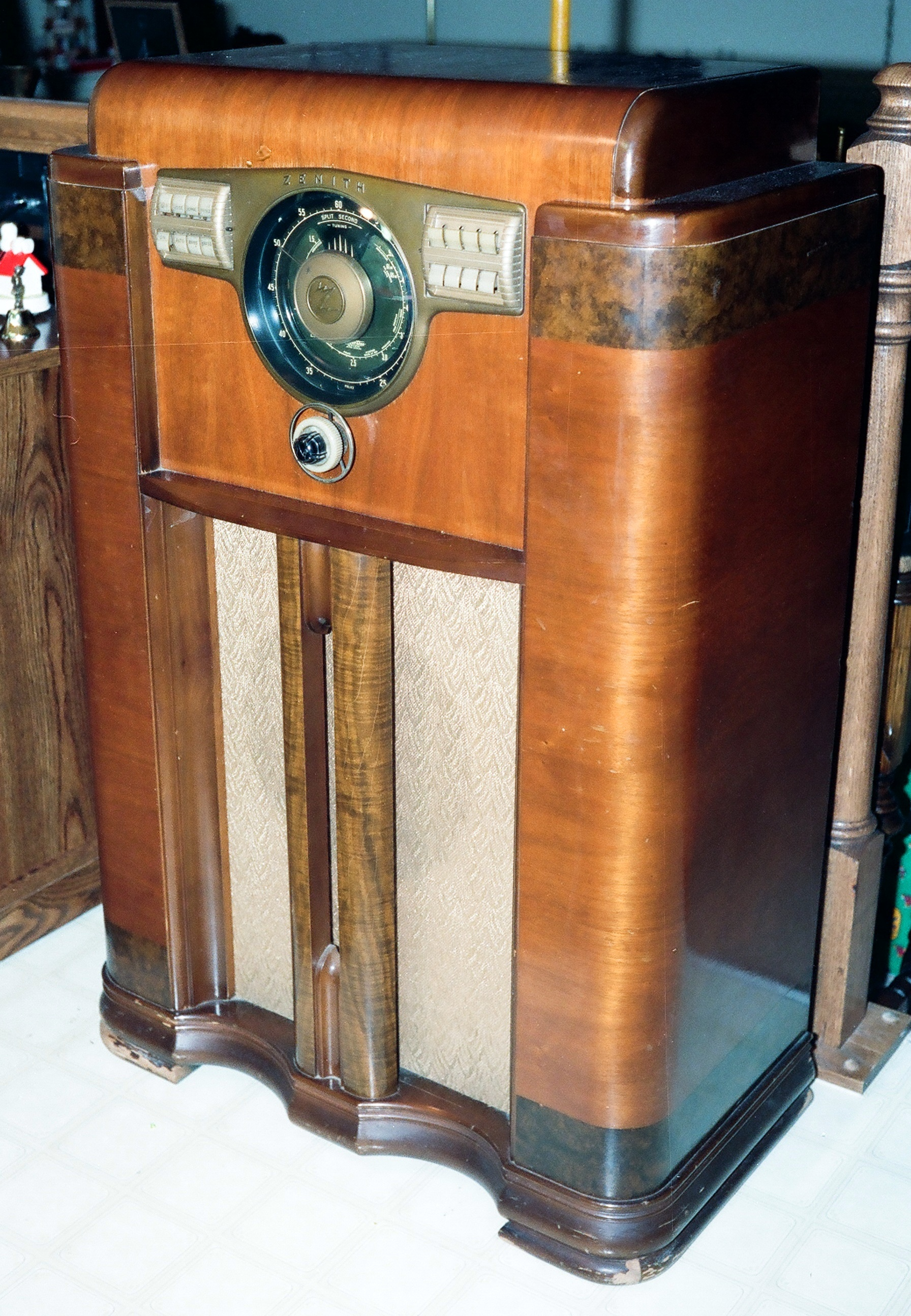
1938 Zenith Model 12-S vacuum-tube console radio, capable of picking up mediumwave and shortwave AM transmissions. "All Wave" receivers could also pick up the third AM band: longwave (LW).

Unlike telegraph and telephone systems, which used completely different types of equipment, most radio receivers were equally suitable for both radiotelegraph and radiotelephone reception. In 1903 and 1904, the electrolytic detector and thermionic diode (Fleming valve) were invented by Reginald Fessenden and John Ambrose Fleming, respectively. Most important, in 1904–1906, the crystal detector, the simplest and cheapest AM detector, was developed by G. W. Pickard. Homemade crystal radios spread rapidly during the next 15 years, providing ready audiences for the first radio broadcasts. One limitation of crystals sets was the lack of amplifying the signals, so listeners had to use earphones, and it required the development of vacuum-tube receivers before loudspeakers could be used. The dynamic cone loudspeaker, invented in 1924, greatly improved audio frequency response over the previous horn speakers, allowing music to be reproduced with good fidelity. AM radio offered the highest sound quality available in a home audio device prior to the introduction of the high-fidelity, long-playing record in the late 1940s.

Listening habits changed in the 1960s due to the introduction of the revolutionary transistor radio (Regency TR-1, the first transistor radio released December 1954), which was made possible by the invention of the transistor in 1948. (The transistor was invented at Bell labs and released in June 1948.) Their compact size—small enough to fit in a shirt pocket—and lower power requirements, compared to vacuum tubes, meant that for the first time radio receivers were readily portable. The transistor radio became the most widely used communication device in history, with billions manufactured by the 1970s. Radio became a ubiquitous "companion medium" which people could take with them anywhere they went.

=== Early experimental broadcasts ===
The demarcation between what is considered "experimental" and "organized" broadcasting is largely arbitrary. Listed below are some of the early AM radio broadcasts, which, due to their irregular schedules and limited purposes, can be classified as "experimental":

- Christmas Eve 1906. Until the early 1930s, it was generally accepted that Lee de Forest's series of demonstration broadcasts begun in 1907 were the first transmissions of music and entertainment by radio. However, in 1932, an article prepared by Samuel M. Kintner, a former associate of Reginald Fessenden, asserted that Fessenden had actually conducted two earlier broadcasts. This claim was based solely on information included in a January 29, 1932, letter that Fessenden had sent to Kintner. (Fessenden subsequently died 5 months before Kintner's article appeared.) In his letter, Fessenden reported that, on the evening of December 24, 1906 (Christmas Eve), he had made the first of two broadcasts of music and entertainment to a general audience, using the alternator-transmitter at Brant Rock, Massachusetts. Fessenden remembered producing a short program that included playing a phonograph record, followed by his playing the violin and singing, and closing with a Bible reading. He also stated that a second short program was broadcast on December 31 (New Year's Eve). The intended audience for both transmissions was primarily shipboard radio operators along the Atlantic seaboard. Fessenden claimed these two programs had been widely publicized in advance, with the Christmas Eve broadcast heard "as far down" as Norfolk, Virginia, while the New Year's Eve broadcast had been received in the West Indies. However, extensive efforts to verify Fessenden's claim during both the 50th and 100th anniversaries of the claimed broadcasts, which included reviewing ships' radio log accounts and other contemporary sources, have so far failed to confirm that these reported holiday broadcasts actually took place.
- 1907-1912. Lee de Forest conducted multiple test broadcasts beginning in 1907, and was widely quoted promoting the potential of organized radio broadcasting. Using a series of arc transmitters, he made his first entertainment broadcast in February 1907, transmitting electronic telharmonium music from his Parker Building laboratory station in New York City. This was followed by tests that included, in the fall, Eugenia Farrar singing "I Love You Truly" and "Just Awearyin' for You". Additional promotional events in New York included live performances by famous Metropolitan Opera stars such as Mariette Mazarin and Enrico Caruso. He also broadcast phonograph music from the Eiffel Tower in Paris. His company equipped the U.S. Navy's Great White Fleet with experimental arc radiotelephones for their 1908 around-the-world cruise, and the operators broadcast phonograph music as the ships entered ports like San Francisco and Honolulu.
- June 1910. In a June 23, 1910, notarized letter that was published in a catalog produced by the Electro Importing Company of New York, Charles "Doc" Herrold reported that, using one of that company's spark coils to create a "high frequency spark" transmitter, he had successfully broadcast "wireless phone concerts to local amateur wireless men". Herrold lived in San Jose, California.
- 1913. Robert Goldschmidt began experimental radiotelephone transmissions from the Laeken station, near Brussels, Belgium, and by March 13, 1914, the tests had been heard as far away as the Eiffel Tower in Paris.
- 1914–1919. "University of Wisconsin electrical engineering Professor Edward Bennett sets up a personal radio transmitter on campus and in June 1915 is issued an Experimental radio station license with the call sign 9XM. Activities included regular Morse Code broadcasts of weather forecasts and sending game reports for a Wisconsin-Ohio State basketball game on February 17, 1917.
- January 15, 1920. Broadcasting in the United Kingdom began with impromptu news and phonograph music over 2MT, the 15 kW experimental tube transmitter at Marconi's factory in Chelmsford, Essex, at a frequency of 120 kHz. On June 15, 1920, the Daily Mail newspaper sponsored the first scheduled British radio concert, by the famed Australian opera diva Nellie Melba. This transmission was heard throughout much of Europe, including in Berlin, Paris, The Hague, Madrid, Spain, and Sweden. Chelmsford continued broadcasting concerts with noted performers. A few months later, in spite of burgeoning popularity, the government ended the broadcasts, due to complaints that the station's longwave signal was interfering with more important communication, in particular military aircraft radio.
- August 27, 1920. Argentina made the first mass radio transmission as a communication medium. Medicine students of the UBA made the first radio program by transmitting Wagner's Parsifal on radio and picked up by about 100 amateurs in the city, emitting from the roof of the Teatro Colón. They kept transmitting over the nights different operas being the first in offering a radio program. There were known as the "Locos de la azotea" (the crazies of the roof).

=== Organized broadcasting ===
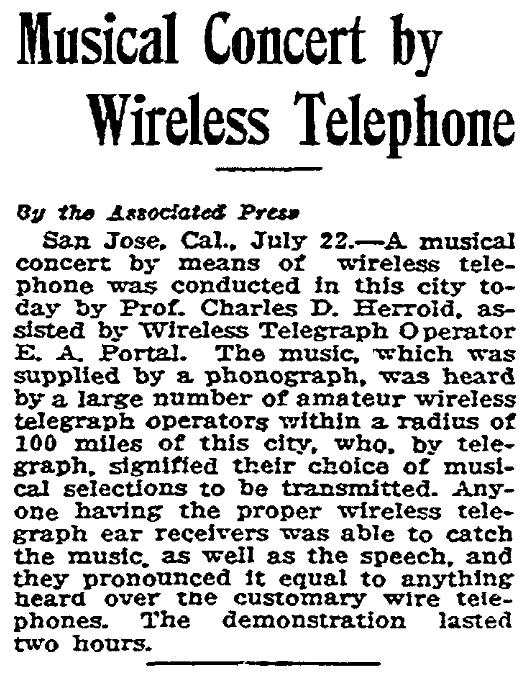
In July 1912, Charles "Doc" Herrold began weekly broadcasts in San Jose, California, using an arc transmitter.

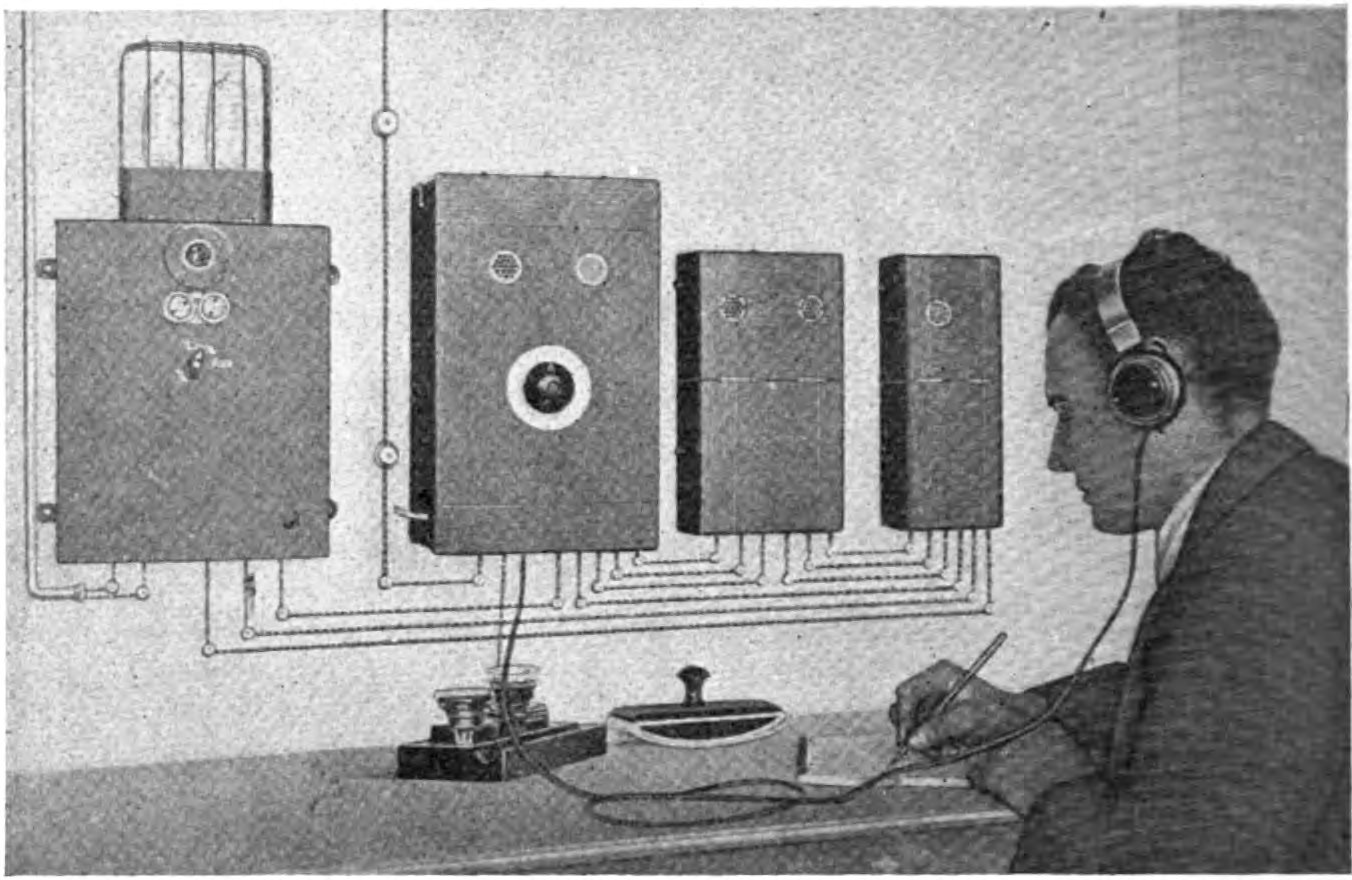
Broadcasting in Germany began 1922 as a Post Office monopoly on a subscription basis, using sealed receivers which could only receive one station.

Following World War I, the number of stations providing a regular broadcasting service greatly increased, primarily due to advances in vacuum-tube technology. In response to ongoing activities, government regulators eventually codified standards for which stations could make broadcasts intended for the general public, for example, in the United States formal recognition of a "broadcasting service" came with the establishment of regulations effective December 1, 1921, and Canadian authorities created a separate category of "radio-telephone broadcasting stations" in April 1922. However, there were numerous cases of entertainment broadcasts being presented on a regular schedule before their formal recognition by government regulators. Some early examples include:

- July 21, 1912. The first person to transmit entertainment broadcasts on a regular schedule appears to have been Charles "Doc" Herrold, who inaugurated weekly programs, using an arc transmitter, from his Wireless School station in San Jose, California. The broadcasts continued until the station was shut down due to the entrance of the United States into World War I in April 1917.
- March 28, 1914. The Laeken station in Belgium, under the oversight of Robert Goldschmidt, inaugurated a weekly series of concerts, transmitted at 5:00 p.m. on Saturdays. These continued for about 4 months until July, and were ended by the start of World War I. In August 1914 the Laeken facilities were destroyed, to keep them from falling into the hands of invading German troops.
- November 1916. De Forest perfected "Oscillion" power vacuum tubes, capable of use in radio transmitters, and inaugurated daily broadcasts of entertainment and news from his New York "Highbridge" station, 2XG. This station also suspended operations in April 1917 due to the prohibition of civilian radio transmissions following the United States' entry into World War I. Its most publicized program was the broadcasting of election results for the Hughes-Wilson presidential election on November 7, 1916, with updates provided by wire from the New York American offices. An estimated 7,000 radio listeners as far as 200 miles (320 kilometers) from New York heard election returns interspersed with patriotic music.
- April 17, 1919. Shortly after the end of World War I, F. S. McCullough at the Glenn L. Martin aviation plant in Cleveland, Ohio, began a weekly series of phonograph concerts. However, the broadcasts were soon suspended, due to interference complaints by the U.S. Navy.
- November 6, 1919. The first scheduled (pre-announced in the press) Dutch radio broadcast was made by Nederlandsche Radio Industrie station PCGG at The Hague, which began regular concerts broadcasts. It found it had a large audience outside the Netherlands, mostly in the UK. (Rather than true AM signals, at least initially this station used a form of narrowband FM, which required receivers to be slightly detuned to receive the signals using slope detection.)
- Late 1919. De Forest's New York station, 2XG, returned to the airwaves in late 1919 after having to suspend operations during World War I. The station continued to operate until early 1920, when it was shut down because the transmitter had been moved to a new location without permission.
- May 20, 1920. Experimental Canadian Marconi station XWA (later CFCF, deleted in 2010 as CINW) in Montreal began regular broadcasts, and claims status as the first commercial broadcaster in the world.
- June 1920. De Forest transferred 2XG's former transmitter to San Francisco, California, where it was relicensed as 6XC, the "California Theater station". By June 1920 the station began transmitting daily concerts. De Forest later stated that this was the "first radio-telephone station devoted solely" to broadcasting to the public.
- August 20, 1920. On this date the Detroit News began daily transmissions over station 8MK (later WWJ), located in the newspaper's headquarters building. The newspaper began extensively publicizing station operations beginning on August 31, 1920, with a special program featuring primary election returns. Station management later claimed the title of being where "commercial radio broadcasting began".
- November 2, 1920. Beginning on October 17, 1919, Westinghouse engineer Frank Conrad began broadcasting recorded and live music on a semi-regular schedule from his home station, 8XK in Wilkinsburg, Pennsylvania. This inspired his employer to begin its own ambitious service at the company's headquarters in East Pittsburgh, Pennsylvania. Operations began, initially with the call sign 8ZZ, with an election night program featuring election returns on November 2, 1920. As KDKA, the station adopted a daily schedule beginning on December 21, 1920. This station is another contender for the title of "first commercial station".
- January 3, 1921. University of Wisconsin - Regular schedule of voice broadcasts begin; 9XM is the first radio station in the United States to provide the weather forecast by voice (January 3). In September, farm market broadcasts are added. On November 1, 9XM carries the first live broadcast of a symphony orchestra—the Cincinnati Symphony Orchestra from the UW Armory using a single microphone.

=== Radio networks ===
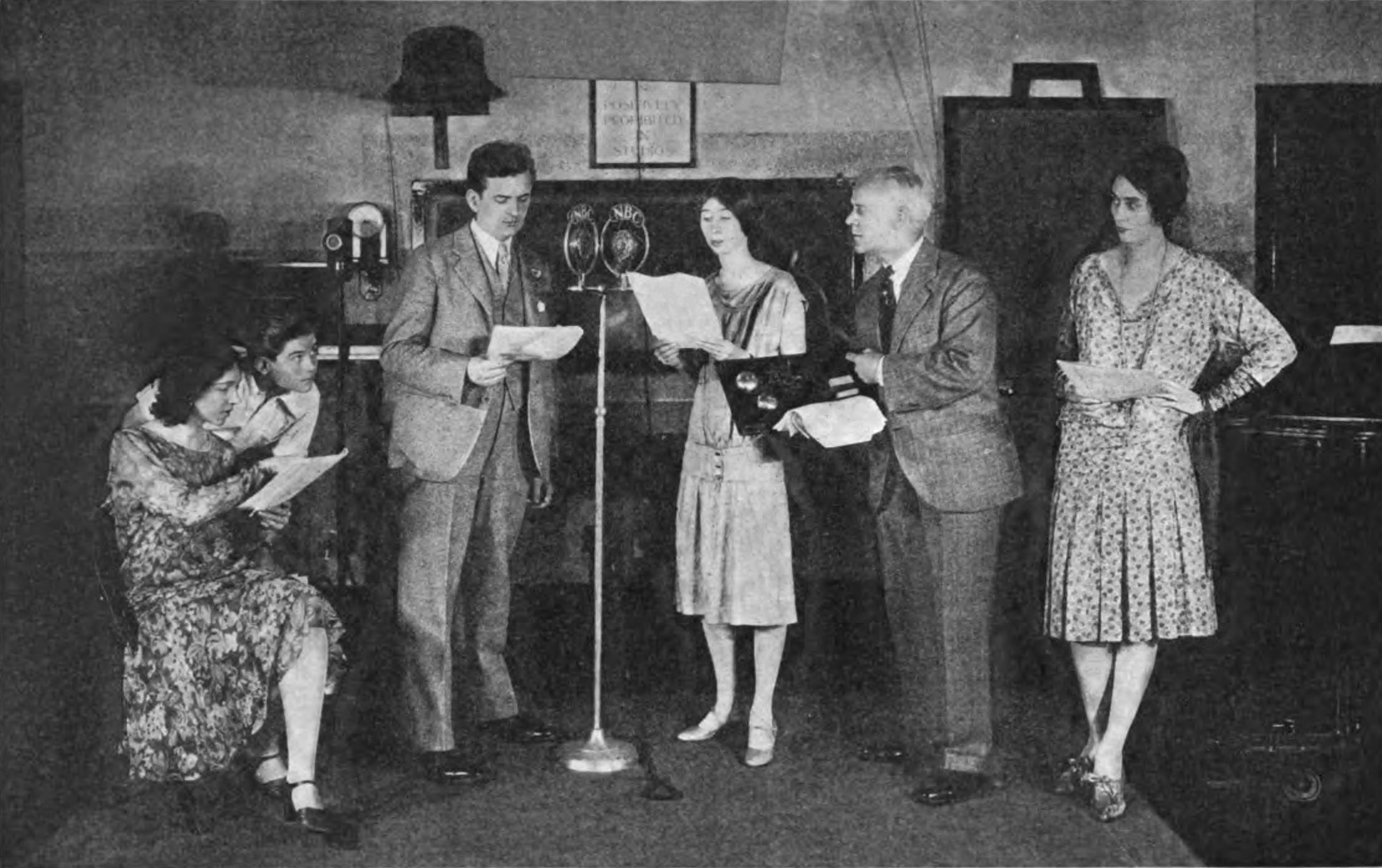
A live radio play being broadcast at NBC studios in New York. Most 1920s through 1940s network programs were broadcast live.

Because most longwave radio frequencies were used for international radiotelegraph communication, a majority of early broadcasting stations operated on mediumwave frequencies, whose limited range generally restricted them to local audiences. One method for overcoming this limitation, as well as a method for sharing program costs, was to create radio networks, linking stations together with telephone lines to provide a nationwide audience.

==== United States ====
In the U.S., the American Telephone and Telegraph Company (AT&T) was the first organization to create a radio network, and also to promote commercial advertising, which it called "toll" broadcasting. Its flagship station, WEAF (now WFAN) in New York City, sold blocks of airtime to commercial sponsors that developed entertainment shows containing commercial messages. AT&T held a monopoly on quality telephone lines, and by 1924 had linked 12 stations in Eastern cities into a "chain". The Radio Corporation of America (RCA), General Electric, and Westinghouse organized a competing network around its own flagship station, RCA's WJZ (now WABC) in New York City, but were hampered by AT&T's refusal to lease connecting lines or allow them to sell airtime. In 1926, AT&T sold its radio operations to RCA, which used them to form the nucleus of the new NBC network. By the 1930s, most of the major radio stations in the country were affiliated with networks owned by two companies, NBC and CBS. In 1934, a third national network, the Mutual Radio Network, was formed as a cooperative owned by its stations.

==== United Kingdom ====
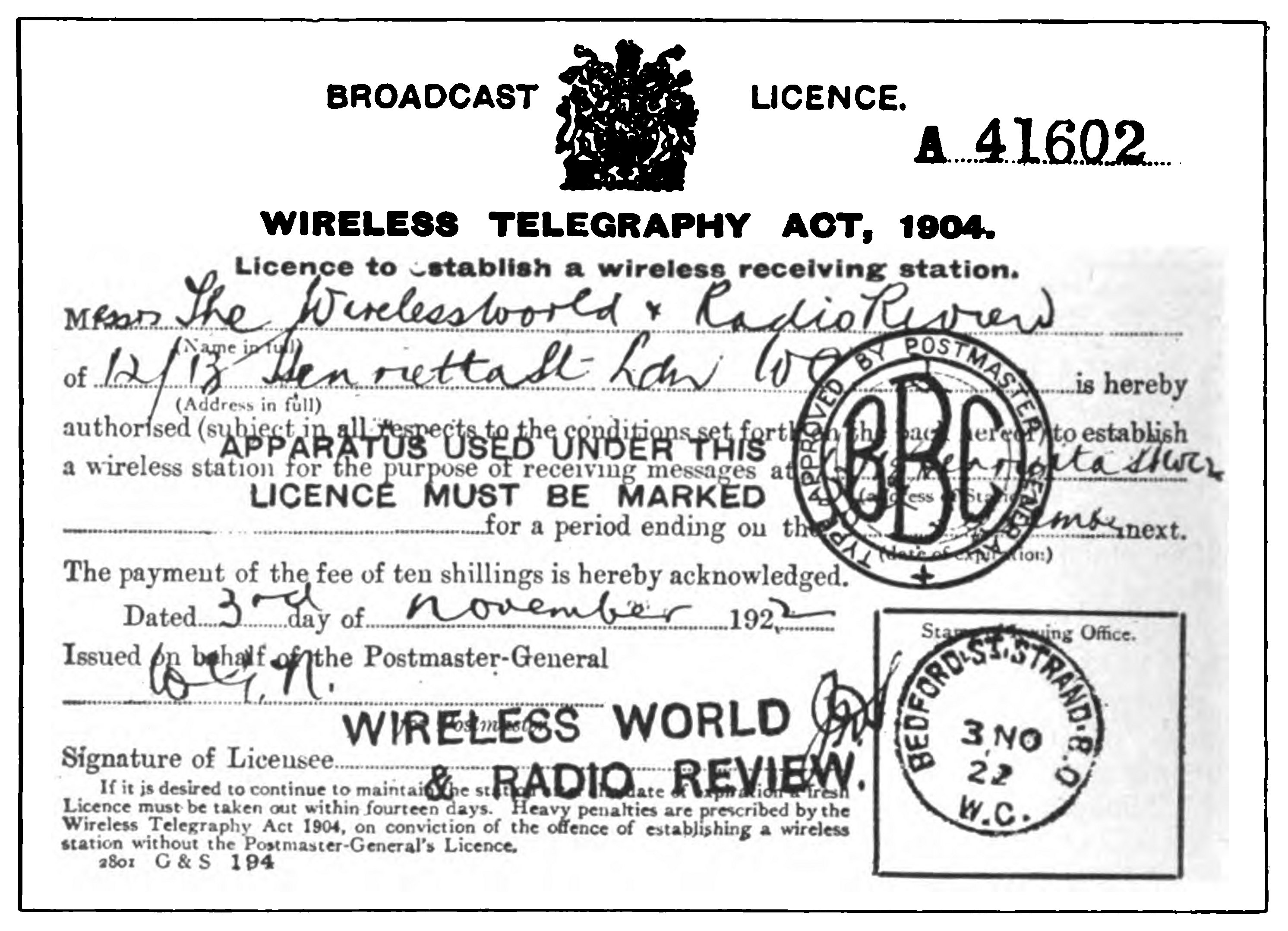
A BBC receiver licence from 1922. The British government required listeners to purchase yearly licences, which financed the stations.

A second country which quickly adopted network programming was the United Kingdom, and its national network quickly became a prototype for a state-managed monopoly of broadcasting. A rising interest in radio broadcasting by the British public pressured the government to reintroduce the service, following its suspension in 1920. However, the government also wanted to avoid what it termed the "chaotic" U.S. experience of allowing large numbers of stations to operate with few restrictions. There were also concerns about broadcasting becoming dominated by the Marconi company. Arrangements were made for six large radio manufacturers to form a consortium, the British Broadcasting Company (BBC), established on October 18, 1922, which was given a monopoly on broadcasting. This enterprise was supported by a tax on radio sets sales, plus an annual license fee on receivers, collected by the Post Office. Initially the eight stations were allowed regional autonomy. In 1927, the original broadcasting organization was replaced by a government chartered British Broadcasting Corporation. an independent nonprofit supported solely by a 10 shilling receiver license fee. Both highbrow and mass-appeal programs were carried by the National and Regional networks.

=== "Golden Age of Radio" ===
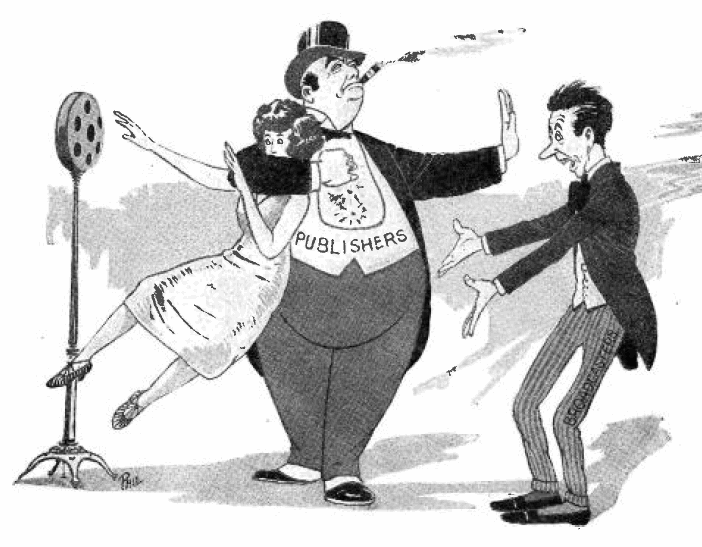
When broadcasting began in 1920, music was played on air without regard to its copyright status. Music publishers challenged this practice as being copyright infringement, which for a time kept many popular tunes off the air, and this 1925 U.S. editorial cartoon shows a rich publisher muzzling two radio performers. The radio industry eventually agreed to make royalty payments.

The period from the early 1920s through the 1940s is often called the "Golden Age of Radio". During this period AM radio was the main source of home entertainment, until it was replaced by television. For the first time entertainment was provided from outside the home, replacing traditional forms of entertainment such as oral storytelling and music from family members. New forms were created, including radio plays, mystery serials, soap operas, quiz shows, variety hours, situation comedies and children's shows. Radio news, including remote reporting, allowed listeners to be vicariously present at notable events.

Radio greatly eased the isolation of rural life. Political officials could now speak directly to millions of citizens. One of the first to take advantage of this was American president Franklin Roosevelt, who became famous for his fireside chats during the Great Depression. However, broadcasting also provided the means to use propaganda as a powerful government tool, and contributed to the rise of fascist and communist ideologies.

=== Decline in popularity ===
In the 1940s, two new broadcast media, FM radio and television, began to provide extensive competition with the established broadcasting services. The AM radio industry suffered a serious loss of audience and advertising revenue, and coped by developing new strategies. Network broadcasting gave way to format broadcasting: instead of broadcasting the same programs all over the country, stations individually adopted specialized formats which appealed to different audiences, such as regional and local news, sports, "talk" programs, and programs targeted at minorities. Instead of live music, most stations began playing less expensive recorded music.

In the late 1960s and 1970s, top 40 rock and roll stations in the U.S. and Canada such as WABC and CHUM transmitted highly processed and extended audio to 11 kHz, successfully attracting huge audiences.

In the late 1970s, spurred by the exodus of musical programming to FM stations, the AM radio industry in the United States developed technology for broadcasting in stereo. Other nations adopted AM stereo, most commonly choosing Motorola's C-QUAM, and in 1993, the United States also made the C-QUAM system its standard, after a period allowing four different standards to compete. The selection of a single standard improved acceptance of AM stereo, however overall there was limited adoption of AM stereo worldwide, and interest declined after 1990. With the continued migration of AM stations away from music to news, sports, and talk formats, receiver manufacturers saw little reason to adopt the more expensive stereo tuners, and thus radio stations have little incentive to upgrade to stereo transmission.

In countries where the use of directional antennas is common, such as the United States, transmitter sites consisting of multiple towers often occupy large tracts of land that have significantly increased in value over the decades, to the point that the value of land exceeds that of the station itself. This sometimes results in the sale of the transmitter site, with the station relocating to a more distant shared site using significantly less power, or completely shutting down operations.

The ongoing development of alternative transmission systems, including DAB, satellite radio, and HD radio, continued the decline of the popularity of the traditional broadcast technologies. These new options, including the introduction of Internet streaming, particularly resulted in the reduction of shortwave transmissions, as international broadcasters found ways to reach their audiences more easily.

In 2022, it was reported that AM radio was being removed from a number of electric vehicle (EV) models, including from cars manufactured by Tesla, Audi, Porsche, BMW and Volvo, reportedly due to automakers concerns that an EV's higher electromagnetic interference can disrupt the reception of AM transmissions and hurt the listening experience, among other reasons. However the United States Congress has introduced a bill to require all vehicles sold in the US to have an AM receiver to receive emergency broadcasts.

== AM band revitalization efforts in the United States ==
The FM broadcast band was established in 1941 in the United States, and at the time some suggested that the AM band would soon be eliminated. In 1948, wide-band FM's inventor, Edwin H. Armstrong, predicted that "The broadcasters will set up FM stations which will parallel, carry the same program, as over their AM stations... eventually the day will come, of course, when we will no longer have to build receivers capable of receiving both types of transmission, and then the AM transmitters will disappear." However, FM stations actually struggled for many decades, and it was not until 1978 that FM listenership surpassed that of AM stations. Since then the AM band's share of the audience has continued to decline.

=== Fairness Doctrine repeal ===
In 1987, the elimination of the Fairness Doctrine requirement meant that talk shows, which were commonly carried by AM stations, could adopt a more focused presentation on controversial topics, without the distraction of having to provide airtime for any contrasting opinions. In addition, satellite distribution made it possible for programs to be economically carried on a national scale. The introduction of nationwide talk shows, most prominently Rush Limbaugh's beginning in 1988, was sometimes credited with "saving" AM radio. However, these stations tended to attract older listeners who were of lesser interest to advertisers, and AM radio's audience share continued to erode.

=== AM stereo and AMAX standards ===
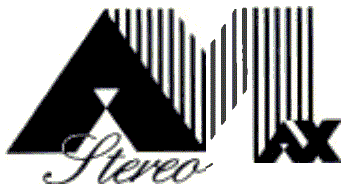
Radios meeting the AMAX standards could display a certification logo, with the "stereo" notation reserved for those capable of AM stereo reception

In 1961, the FCC adopted a single standard for FM stereo transmissions, which was widely credited with enhancing FM's popularity. Developing the technology for AM broadcasting in stereo was challenging due to the need to limit the transmissions to a 20 kHz bandwidth, while also making the transmissions backward compatible with existing non-stereo receivers.

In 1990, the FCC authorized an AM stereo standard developed by Magnavox, but two years later revised its decision to instead approve four competing implementations, saying it would "let the marketplace decide" which was best. The lack of a common standard resulted in consumer confusion and increased the complexity and cost of producing AM stereo receivers.

In 1993, the FCC again revised its policy, by selecting C-QUAM as the sole AM stereo implementation. In 1993, the FCC also endorsed, although it did not make mandatory, AMAX broadcasting standards that were developed by the Electronic Industries Association (EIA) and the National Association of Broadcasters (NAB) with the intention of helping AM stations, especially ones with musical formats, become more competitive with FM broadcasters by promoting better quality receivers. However, the stereo AM and AMAX initiatives had little impact, and a 2015 review of these events concluded that

Initially the consumer manufacturers made a concerted attempt to specify performance of AM receivers through the 1993 AMAX standard, a joint effort of the EIA and the NAB, with FCC backing... The FCC rapidly followed up on this with codification of the CQUAM AM stereo standard, also in 1993. At this point, the stage appeared to be set for rejuvenation of the AM band. Nevertheless, with the legacy of confusion and disappointment in the rollout of the multiple incompatible AM stereo systems, and failure of the manufacturers (including the auto makers) to effectively promote AMAX radios, coupled with the ever-increasing background of noise in the band, the general public soon lost interest and moved on to other media.

=== Expanded band ===
On June 8, 1988, an International Telecommunication Union (ITU)-sponsored conference held at Rio de Janeiro, Brazil, adopted provisions, effective July 1, 1990, to extend the upper end of the Region 2 AM broadcast band, by adding ten frequencies which spanned from 1610 kHz to 1700 kHz. At this time it was suggested that as many as 500 U.S. stations could be assigned to the new frequencies.

On April 12, 1990, the FCC voted to begin the process of populating the expanded band, with the main priority being the reduction of interference on the existing AM band, by transferring selected stations to the new frequencies. It was now estimated that the expanded band could accommodate around 300 U.S. stations. However, it turned out that the number of possible station reassignments was much lower, with a 2006 accounting reporting that, out of 4,758 licensed U.S. AM stations, only 56 were now operating on the expanded band. Moreover, despite an initial requirement that by the end of 5 years, either the original station or its expanded band counterpart had to cease broadcasting, as of 2015, there were 25 cases where the original standard band station was still on the air, despite also operating as an expanded band station.

=== HD radio ===

HD Radio is a digital audio broadcasting method developed by iBiquity. In 2002, its "hybrid mode", which simultaneously transmits a standard analog signal as well as a digital one, was approved by the FCC for use by AM stations, initially only during daytime hours, due to concerns that during the night its wider bandwidth would cause unacceptable interference to stations on adjacent frequencies. In 2007, nighttime operation was also authorized.

The number of hybrid mode AM stations is not exactly known, because the FCC does not keep track of the stations employing the system, and some authorized stations have later turned it off. But as of 2020, the commission estimated that fewer than 250 AM stations were transmitting hybrid mode signals. On October 27, 2020, the FCC voted to allow AM stations to eliminate their analog transmissions and convert to all-digital operation, with the requirement that stations making the change had to continue to make programming available over "at least one free over-the-air digital programming stream that is comparable to or better in audio quality than a standard analog broadcast".

=== FM translator stations ===
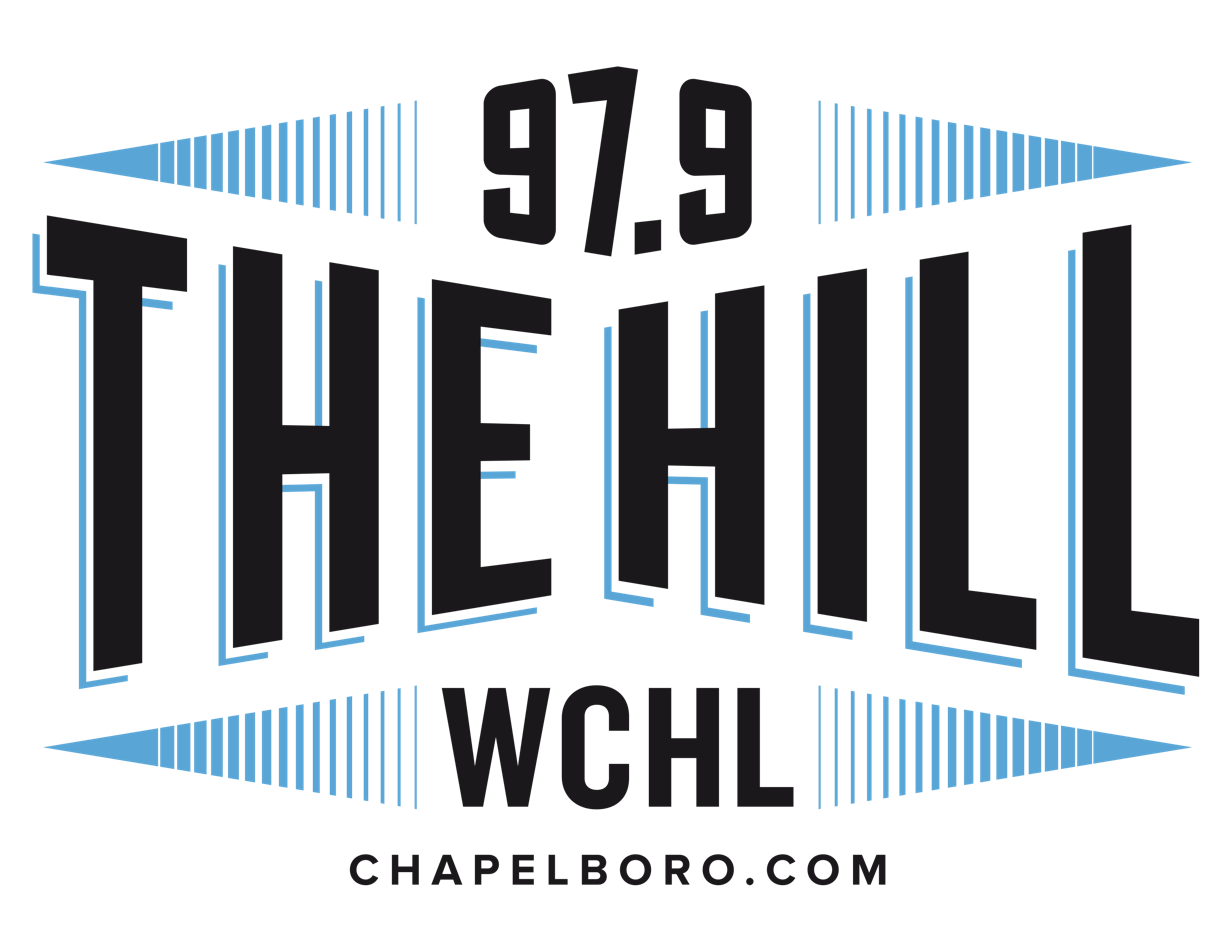
Many U.S. AM stations no longer publicize their AM signals, instead promoting simulcasts by FM band translators and Internet streams.

Despite the various actions, AM band audiences continued to contract, and the number of stations began to slowly decline. A 2009 FCC review reported that "The story of AM radio over the last 50 years has been a transition from being the dominant form of audio entertainment for all age groups to being almost non-existent to the youngest demographic groups. Among persons aged 12–24, AM accounts for only 4% of listening, while FM accounts for 96%. Among persons aged 25–34, AM accounts for only 9% of listening, while FM accounts for 91%. The median age of listeners to the AM band is 57 years old, a full generation older than the median age of FM listeners."

In 2009, the FCC made a major regulatory change, when it adopted a policy allowing AM stations to simulcast over FM translator stations. Translators had previously been available only to FM broadcasters, in order to increase coverage in fringe areas. Their assignment for use by AM stations was intended to approximate the station's daytime coverage, which in cases where the stations reduced power at night, often resulted in expanded nighttime coverage. Although the translator stations are not permitted to originate programming when the "primary" AM station is broadcasting, they are permitted to do so during nighttime hours for AM stations licensed for daytime-only operation.

Prior to the adoption of the new policy, as of March 18, 2009, the FCC had issued 215 Special Temporary Authority grants for FM translators relaying AM stations. After creation of the new policy, by 2011, there were approximately 500 in operation, and as of 2020, approximately 2,800 of the 4,570 licensed AM stations were rebroadcasting on one or more FM translators. In 2009, the FCC stated that "We do not intend to allow these cross-service translators to be used as surrogates for FM stations". However, based on station slogans, especially in the case of recently adopted musical formats, in most cases the expectation is that listeners will primarily be tuning into the FM signal rather than the nominally "primary" AM station. A 2020 review noted that "for many owners, keeping their AM stations on the air now is pretty much just about retaining their FM translator footprint rather than keeping the AM on the air on its own merits".

=== Additional activities ===
In 2018, the FCC, led by then-Commission Chairman Ajit Pai, proposed greatly reducing signal protection for 50 kW Class A "clear channel" stations. This would allow co-channel secondary stations to operate with higher powers, especially at night. However, the Federal Emergency Management Agency (FEMA) expressed concerns that this would reduce the effectiveness of emergency communications.

=== Electric vehicles ===
In May 2023, a bipartisan group of lawmakers in the United States introduced legislation making it illegal for automakers to eliminate AM radio from their cars. The lawmakers argue that AM radio is an important tool for public safety due to being a component of the Emergency Alert System (EAS). Some automakers have been eliminating AM radio from their electric vehicles (EVs) due to interference from the electric motors, but the lawmakers argue that this is a safety risk and that car owners should have access to AM radio regardless of the type of vehicle they drive. The proposed legislation would require all new vehicles to include AM radio at no additional charge, and it would also require automakers that have already eliminated AM radio to inform customers of alternatives.

== Other digital standards ==
DRM30 is another standard to broadcast on the AM bands, with implementation in India and China, among other countries.

== Technical information ==
AM radio technology is simpler than later transmission systems. An AM receiver detects amplitude variations in the radio waves at a particular frequency, then amplifies changes in the signal voltage to operate a loudspeaker or earphone. However, the simplicity of AM transmission also makes it vulnerable to "static" (radio noise, radio frequency interference) created by both natural atmospheric electrical activity such as lightning, and electrical and electronic equipment, including fluorescent lights, motors and vehicle ignition systems. In large urban centers, AM radio signals can be severely disrupted by metal structures and tall buildings. As a result, AM radio tends to do best in areas where FM frequencies are in short supply, or in thinly populated or mountainous areas where FM coverage is poor. Great care must be taken to avoid mutual interference between stations operating on the same frequency. In general, an AM transmission needs to be about 20 times stronger than an interfering signal to avoid a reduction in quality, in contrast to FM signals, where the "capture effect" means that the dominant signal needs to only be about twice as strong as the interfering one.

To allow room for more stations on the mediumwave broadcast band in the United States, in June 1989, the FCC adopted a National Radio Systems Committee (NRSC) standard that limited maximum transmitted audio bandwidth to 10.2 kHz, limiting occupied bandwidth to 20.4 kHz. The former audio limitation was 15 kHz resulting in bandwidth of 30 kHz. Another common limitation on AM fidelity is the result of receiver design, although some efforts have been made to improve this, notably through the AMAX standards adopted in the United States.

=== Broadcast band frequencies ===
AM broadcasts are used on several frequency bands. The allocation of these bands is governed by the ITU's Radio Regulations and, on the national level, by each country's telecommunications administration (the FCC in the U.S., for example) subject to international agreements.

The frequency ranges given here are those that are allocated to stations. Because of the bandwidth taken up by the sidebands, the range allocated for the band as a whole is usually about 5 kHz wider on either side.

==== Longwave broadcasting ====
Longwave (also known as Low frequency (LF); 148.5–283.5 kHz) Broadcasting stations in this band are assigned transmitting frequencies in the range 153–279 kHz, and generally maintain 9 kHz spacing. Longwave assignments for broadcasting only exist in ITU Region 1 (Europe, Africa, and northern and central Asia) and are not allocated elsewhere. Individual stations have coverage measured in the hundreds of kilometers; however, there is only a very limited number of available broadcasting slots.

Most of the earliest broadcasting experiments took place on longwave frequencies; however, complaints about interference from existing services, particularly the military, led to most broadcasting moving to higher frequencies.

==== Medium-wave broadcasting ====
Medium wave (also known as medium frequency (MF)), is by far the most commonly used AM broadcasting band. In ITU Regions 1 and 3, transmitting frequencies run from 531 kHz to 1602 kHz, with 9 kHz spacing (526.5–1606.5 kHz), and in ITU Region 2 (the Americas), transmitting frequencies are 530–1700 kHz, using 10 kHz spacing (525–1705 kHz), including the ITU Extended AM broadcast band, authorized in Region 2, between 1605 kHz and 1705 kHz, previously used for police radio.

==== Shortwave broadcasting ====
Shortwave (also known as High frequency (HF)) transmissions range from approximately 2.3 to 26.1 MHz, divided into 14 broadcast bands. Shortwave broadcasts generally use a narrow 5 kHz channel spacing. Shortwave is used by audio services intended to be heard at great distances from the transmitting station. The long range of shortwave broadcasts comes at the expense of lower audio fidelity.

Most broadcast services use AM transmissions, although some use a modified version of AM such as Single-sideband modulation (SSB) or an AM-compatible version of SSB such as "SSB with carrier reinserted".

==== VHF AM broadcasting ====
Beginning in the mid-1930s, the United States evaluated options for the establishment of broadcasting stations using much higher transmitting frequencies. In October 1937, the FCC announced a second band of AM stations, consisting of 75 channels spanning from 41.02 to 43.98 MHz, which were informally called Apex.

The 40 kHz spacing between adjacent frequencies was four times that of the 10 kHz spacing used on the standard AM broadcast band, which reduced adjacent-frequency interference, and provided more bandwidth for high-fidelity programming. However, this band was eliminated effective on January 1, 1941, after the FCC determined that establishing a band of FM stations was preferable.

=== Other distribution methods ===
Beginning in the mid-1930s, starting with "The Brown Network" at Brown University in Providence, Rhode Island, a very low power broadcasting method known as carrier current was developed, and mostly adopted on U.S. college campuses. In this approach AM broadcast signals are distributed over electric power lines, which radiate a signal receivable at a short distance from the lines. In Switzerland a system known as "wire broadcasting" (Telefonrundspruch in German) transmitted AM signals over telephone lines in the longwave band until 1998, when it was shut down. In the UK, Rediffusion was an early pioneer of AM radio cable distribution.

Hybrid digital broadcast systems, which combine (mono analog) AM transmission with digital sidebands, have started to be used around the world. In the United States, iBiquity's proprietary HD Radio has been adopted and approved by the FCC for medium wave transmissions, while Digital Radio Mondiale is a more open effort often used on the shortwave bands, and can be used alongside many AM broadcasts. Both of these standards are capable of broadcasting audio of significantly greater fidelity than that of standard AM with current bandwidth limitations, and a theoretical frequency response of 0–16 kHz, in addition to stereo sound and text data.

=== Microbroadcasting ===
Some microbroadcasters, especially those in the United States operating under the FCC's Part 15 rules, and pirate radio operators on mediumwave and shortwave, achieve greater range than possible on the FM band. On mediumwave these stations often transmit on 1610 kHz to 1710 kHz. Hobbyists also use low-power AM (LPAM) transmitters to provide programming for vintage radio equipment in areas where AM programming is not widely available or does not carry programming the listener desires; in such cases the transmitter, which is designed to cover only the immediate property and perhaps nearby areas, is connected to a computer, an FM radio or an MP3 player. Microbroadcasting and pirate radio have generally been supplanted by streaming audio on the Internet, but some schools and hobbyists still use LPAM transmissions.

== See also ==
- Digital Radio Mondiale (DRM), a digital radio method using the bands LW, MW, SW, and the VHF bands
- Amplitude Modulation Signalling System, a digital system for adding low bitrate information to an AM broadcast signal
- CAM-D, a hybrid digital radio format for AM broadcasting
- Effective radiated power (ERP), standardised definition of radio frequency power
- Extended AM broadcast band
- History of radio
- List of 50 kW AM radio stations in the United States
- Lists of radio stations in North America
- Oldest radio stations
- MW DXing, the hobby of receiving distant AM radio stations on the mediumwave band.
