= WA2XMN =

Experimental FM radio station in Alpine, New Jersey

- Alpine, New Jersey; United States
- Broadcast area: New York metropolitan area
- Frequency: 42.8 MHz

Programming
- Format: Public radio; eclectic music

History
- First air date: June 11, 2005
- Former call signs: WB9XXE (2005)
- Call sign meaning: Referring to W2XMN, Edwin Armstrong's original station call-sign

Technical information
- ERP: 250 watts
- Transmitter coordinates: 40°57′39″N 73°55′23.00″W (NAD27)

Links
- Website: www.wa2xmn.ar88.net

WA2XMN is an experimental FM radio station which broadcasts sporadically from the Armstrong Tower in Alpine, New Jersey. The station commemorates the pioneering broadcasts of the world's first FM radio station, W2XMN, built by Edwin Howard Armstrong, which began experimental broadcasts from this tower in June 1938 followed by full power broadcasting beginning on July 18, 1939. Armstrong's station signed off as KE2XCC on March 6, 1954.

WA2XMN broadcasts at 42.8 MHz, one of the frequencies used by Armstrong's station on the original 42–50 MHz FM broadcast band. Transmitting from near the top of the 425-foot (130 m) tall Armstrong Tower, which sits on top of the 500-foot (150 m) tall Palisades (for a total height of over 900 feet (270 m) above mean sea level), WA2XMN has a listening range of roughly 60–100 miles (97–161 km). The building at the base of the tower still has the W2XMN call sign engraved above the entrance.

The station signed on using a restored Phasitron transmitter built by Steve Hemphill, with technical assistance from WFDU 89.1, which has broadcast from the tower since its first sign on in 1971. The WA2XMN broadcasts have been simulcast on WFDU's FM signal and internet stream, allowing listeners who lack a VHF receiver that can tune to 42.8 MHz to listen to the broadcasts.

On June 19, 2025, "for the first time in a decade", WA2XMN was operated from the Alpine site, in commemoration of the 90th anniversary of Armstrong's first public demonstration of FM radio.
