= WFMN (New Jersey) =

Radio station in Alpine, New Jersey (1941–1953)

WFMN (originally W31NY) was a commercial FM radio station located in Alpine, New Jersey. It was licensed from 1941 until around 1953 to inventor Edwin Howard Armstrong, and was co-located with two other Armstrong stations, W2XMN (until its suspension in 1949), and W2XEA/KE2XCC (1945-1954). However, for most of its existence WFMN was authorized for significantly lower power than the other two stations, and appears to have rarely been on the air.

== History ==
In May 1940, the Federal Communications Commission (FCC) authorized an FM band effective January 1, 1941, operating on 40 channels spanning 42–50 MHz. (This was later changed to 88–106 MHz, and still later to 88–108 MHz, which increased the number of channels to 100.) At this time Edwin Howard Armstrong, the inventor of "wide-band" FM, was already operating experimental station W2XMN on 42.8 MHz, transmitting from a tower he had constructed a few miles north of New York City in Alpine, New Jersey. Under the new provisions he was granted an additional authorization for a commercial station broadcasting on 43.1 MHz from the Alpine site, which was issued the call sign W31NY. (Note: The initial policy for commercial FM station call signs included an initial "W" for stations located east of the Mississippi River, followed by the last two digits of a station's frequency assignment, "31" in this case, and closing with a one or two character city identifier, which for New York metropolitan stations was "NY".)

Under the initial regulations, commercial FM frequencies were divided into three categories, with "Class C" stations having the greatest coverage. W31NY was assigned to one of three Class C frequencies available to the New York City area, which had an estimated coverage area of 15,610 square miles (40,400 km^{2}), corresponding to a radius of approximately 70 miles (110 km). There are very few reports of W31NY actually making any broadcasts, in contrast to W2XMN, which was assigned to a similar frequency but with higher power. However, one example occurred in March 1942, when it was reported that W31NY had been used to rebroadcast a program relayed from station W43B near Boston. Effective November 1, 1943, the FCC modified its policy for FM station callsigns, and W31NY's call sign was changed to WFMN.

On June 27, 1945, the FCC announced that due to interference concerns it was reallocating the existing FM "low band" frequencies to other services, with 42–44 MHz going to "non-government fixed and mobile", and 44–50 MHz allocated to television channel 1. (The TV allocation was later reassigned as additional "non-government fixed and mobile" frequencies.) This in turn meant that existing FM band stations would be relocated to 88-106 MHz (later expanded to 108 MHz). Armstrong had strenuously objected to this move when it was still a proposal under review for being unnecessarily disruptive. However, at the time of its adoption he also announced that to help ease the transition he had developed the technology needed for stations to simultaneously broadcast on both their original "low band" and new "high band" frequencies.

Armstrong immediately filed an application for WFMN to move to 92.1 MHz in the new FM band. However, the station was instead assigned to 100.9 MHz, and designated as a "metropolitan" station, which was a classification that was limited to an effective radiated power (ERP) of 20 kW and a height above average terrain (HAAT) of 500 feet (150 meters). Operating from the Alpine tower, WFMN's HAAT was calculated to be 795 feet (242 meters), so to maintain the same coverage it was restricted to an ERP power of 6 kW. Armstrong quickly complained that WFMN's power was inadequate for sufficient coverage, especially compared to the 100 to 125 kilowatts in use by W2XMN. In 1945, the FCC implemented a major reallocation, known as the "CBS plan", designed to standardize the coverage of New York City FM stations This resulted in WFMN being reassigned to 98.9 MHz. A subsequent reallocation in the fall of 1947 assigned WFMN to 93.1 MHz.

There is little evidence that WFMN actually made any broadcasts after transferring to the new band, in part because it continued to be limited to a power of 6 kW. On August 6, 1945, Armstrong was issued an authorization for a third station at Alpine, W2XEA (KE2XCC after 1949), operating under an experimental grant on 92.1 MHz with 50,000 watts. In late 1948 W2XEA moved from 92.1 MHz to share WFMN's assignment on 93.1 MHz. Although some contemporary sources included notifications that there was a relationship by W2XMN and W2XEA with WFMN, any broadcasts appear to have been conducted by the more powerful experimental stations. An example of this occurred in February 1951, when it was reported that WFMN was being used as a test relay station for daily facsimile transmissions, however Armstrong quickly corrected this, reporting that it was actually KE2XCC that was conducting the tests.

WFMN was also granted a series of special temporary authority (STA) grants, allowing it to "remain silent" to allow for broadcasts by KE2XCC. The last reported STA grant lasted until February 1, 1953, which was an authorization "to suspend regular broadcasting service of WFMN and to operate Class I Experimental Station KE2XCC using its regularly licensed equipment, power and emission on the additional frequency of 93.1 mc for providing FM program service..." There appear to be no further references to WFMN after this, and all other broadcasting activities from the Alpine site ceased following Armstrong's death in early 1954.
