= WNYU-FM =

Radio station at New York University

Under a "Shared Time" agreement with WFDU Teaneck, New Jersey
- New York, New York; United States
- Broadcast area: New York metropolitan area
- Frequency: 89.1 MHz
- Branding: WNYU 89.1 FM

Programming
- Format: Free-form radio

Ownership
- Owner: New York University

History
- First air date: May 3, 1973
- Call sign meaning: "New York University"

Technical information
- Licensing authority: FCC
- Facility ID: 48695
- Class: B1
- ERP: 8,300 watts
- HAAT: 78 metres (256 feet)
- Transmitter coordinates: 40°51′26″N 73°54′48″W
- Repeater: 89.1 WNYU-FM1 (New York)

Links
- Public license information: Public file; LMS
- Webcast: Listen live
- Website: wnyu.org

WNYU-FM (89.1 FM) is a college radio station owned and operated by New York University. Its offices and studios are located at NYU's campus in lower Manhattan. WNYU's main transmitter is located at University Heights in the Bronx, the former location of NYU. Another transmitter, licensed as WNYU-FM1, is a repeater located at University Place at the current campus.

Following negotiations between New York University, WFDU, and the Federal Communications Commission (FCC), an agreement was reached allowing both universities to share the 89.1 FM frequency. Although WFDU and WNYU-FM broadcast on the same frequency, each station operates independently, maintaining separate studio and transmitter facilities, programming, and personnel.
