= WFDU =

Radio station in Teaneck, New Jersey

Under a "Shared Time" agreement with WNYU-FM New York, New York
- Teaneck, New Jersey; United States
- Broadcast area: North Jersey, and New York City
- Frequency: 89.1 MHz (HD Radio)
- Branding: 89.1 WFDU

Programming
- Language: English
- Format: Public radio; eclectic music, oldies
- Subchannels: HD2: Eclectic Sound; HD3: Student Voice of FDU

Ownership
- Owner: Fairleigh Dickinson University

History
- First air date: August 30, 1971; 54 years ago
- Call sign meaning: Fairleigh Dickinson University

Technical information
- Licensing authority: FCC
- Facility ID: 20458
- Class: B1
- ERP: 3,000 watts (Analog); 119 watts (Digital)
- HAAT: 195 meters (640 ft)
- Transmitter coordinates: 40°57′39.4″N 73°55′21.5″W

Links
- Public license information: Public file; LMS
- Webcast: Listen live; Listen live (HD2); Listen live (HD3)
- Website: www.wfdu.fm

WFDU (89.1 MHz) is a public radio station licensed to Fairleigh Dickinson University in Teaneck, New Jersey. Founded in 1971, WFDU's studios are on campus, with its transmitter on the Armstrong Tower in Alpine, New Jersey. Following negotiations with New York University and the Federal Communications Commission, an agreement was reached for the two Universities to share the 89.1 frequency on the FM band. While WFDU and WNYU-FM share the frequency, each station maintains separate transmitter and studio facilities as well as discrete programming and personnel.

The station's broadcast signal has up to a 60-mile radius of its transmitter within the historic Armstrong Field Lab in Alpine. The AFL is the site of the world's first FM station, W2XMN, built by the creator of FM technology, Major Edwin Howard Armstrong. With an increase in antenna height and a power rise to 3,000 watts, WFDU has the potential to reach 8.2 million people. In August 2015, WFDU launched two new HD channels: HD2, which is now called "Eclectic Sound", and HD3, which is now called "Student Voice of FDU".
