= Amy Towers =

American businesswoman and philanthropist

- Born: 1970 (age 55–56)
- Citizenship: United States
- Occupations: businesswoman philanthropist
- Known for: former COO of Glenview Capital Management; founder of the Nduna Foundation
- Spouse: Larry Robbins (div.)
- Children: four
- Website: ndunafoundation.org

Amy L. Towers (born 1970) is an American philanthropist and businesswoman who was formerly the chief operating officer of Glenview Capital Management.

== Biography ==
Towers was a French language and Finance major in college and then worked as a banker for nine years before becoming COO of the hedge fund Glenview Capital Management, founded by her former husband. In 2004, after five years at Glenview, she left the firm to become a full-time philanthropist.

== Philanthropy ==
In 2006, Amy and her then husband donated $5 million to create the Mercury Fund for Emergency Response which provides UNICEF with dedicated funds to use during the early stages of disasters and humanitarian crises. In 2006, she was awarded UNICEF’s Audrey Hepburn Humanitarian Award for her work in conflict zones in Niger, Ethiopia, South Sudan, Darfur, Somalia, and Zimbabwe. In 2007, she founded the Nduna Foundation to provide aid to children in the developing world with an emphasis on food security, HIV/AIDS, education, conservation, and wildlife restoration in Africa. In 2008, she donated $2 million to Teach for America to recruit teachers. In 2010, she donated $1 million to establish the Zimbabwe Collaborative Centre for Operational Research and Evaluation, a policy research and data hub in Zimbabwe created in partnership with the United Nations Children's Fund that provides information to charitable organizations looking to provide assistance in Zimbabwe. In 2010, she elected to serve a five-year term on the board of directors of the Centers for Disease Control and Prevention Foundation. In 2010, Richard Branson, the Nduna Foundation, and Humanity United, an organization backed by Pam Omidyar, the wife of eBay founder Pierre Omidyar founded Enterprise Zimbabwe.

She serves as a Member of the Advisory Council of Acumen Fund, as board member of Human Rights Watch, The Elders, WITNESS, The U.S. Fund for UNICEF, The National Fish and Wildlife Foundation, Millennium Promise, KIPP Academy Charter Schools, The Allen-Stevenson School, and Teach for All. She is also actively involved with the Robin Hood Foundation, the International Medical Corps, and The Elizabeth Glaser Pediatric AIDS Foundation. She is currently the board chair of Mana Nutrition, a producer of RUTF in Fitzgerald, GA.

== Personal life ==
She was married to hedge fund manager Larry Robbins. They had four sons and later divorced. She is now married to Jeff Towers.
