= FM broadcasting in the United States =

FM broadcasting in the United States began in the 1930s at engineer and inventor Edwin Howard Armstrong's experimental station, W2XMN. The use of FM radio has been associated with higher sound quality in music radio.

== History of FM radio in the U.S. ==
In the United States, the FM broadcast band is currently assigned to a 20.2 MHz-wide frequency band, spanning 87.8–108.0 MHz. This is divided into a total of 101 transmitting channels, each 200 kHz wide, with center frequencies of 87.9 to 107.9 MHz, that are designated as channels 200 to 300. In addition, there are a small number of TV stations, described as FM6 operations, which also include an FM station at 87.7 MHz, just below the standard FM band.

In the 1930s investigations were begun into establishing radio stations transmitting on "Very High Frequency" (VHF) assignments above 30 MHz. In October 1937, the Federal Communications Commission (FCC) announced new frequency allocations, which included a band of experimental and educational "Apex" stations, that consisted of 75 channels spanning from 41.02 to 43.98 MHz. Like the existing AM band these stations employed amplitude modulation, however the 40 kHz spacing between adjacent frequencies was four times as much as the 10 kHz spacing on the standard AM broadcast band, which reduced adjacent-frequency interference, and provided more bandwidth for high-fidelity programming.

Also during the 1930s a competing transmission technology, "wide-band frequency modulation", was developed in the United States by Edwin Howard Armstrong, which was promoted as being superior to AM transmissions, in particular due to its high-fidelity and near immunity to static interference. On June 17, 1936 Armstrong formally demonstrated his FM system to the FCC. That year he also set up the first FM radio station, W2XMN in Alpine, New Jersey, to function as a demonstration station. In 1937 the Yankee Network, looking to eventually establish commercial FM operations, was granted a construction permit for an experimental station, W1XOJ, in Paxton, Massachusetts. The first publicized W2XMN broadcast took place on July 18, 1939, which used a high-quality phone line link to rebroadcast a program from WQXR in New York City. On July 24, 1939, W1XOJ inaugurated a regular schedule of 16 hours a day (8 a.m. to midnight). On January 5, 1940, Armstrong, working with the Yankee Network, demonstrated FM broadcasting in a long-distance relay network, via five stations in five states.

In May 1940, largely as the result of Armstrong's efforts, the FCC decided to eliminate the Apex band, and authorized an FM band effective January 1, 1941, operating on 40 channels spanning 42–50 MHz. On October 31, 1940, the first 15 commercial station Construction Permit authorizations were issued. On March 1, 1941 W47NV began broadcasting in Nashville, Tennessee, becoming the first fully licensed commercial FM station. There was significant interest in the new FM band by station owners, however, construction restrictions that went into place during World War II limited the growth of the new service.

Following the end of the war, the FCC moved to standardize its frequency allocations. One area of concern was the effects of tropospheric and Sporadic E propagation, which at times reflected station signals over great distances, causing mutual interference. A particularly controversial proposal, spearheaded by the Radio Corporation of America (RCA), which was headed by David Sarnoff, was that the FM band needed to be shifted to higher frequencies in order to avoid this potential problem. Armstrong charged that this reassignment had the covert goal of disrupting FM radio development, however RCA's proposal prevailed, and on June 27, 1945 the FCC announced the reassignment of the FM band to 80 channels from 88–106 MHz (which was soon expanded to 100 channels from 88–108 MHz), while allocating the former FM band frequencies to "non-government fixed and mobile" (42–44 MHz), and television channel 1 (44–50 MHz), controversially ignoring the effect of tropospheric and Sporadic E propagation on those services.

A period of allowing existing FM stations to broadcast on both the original "low" and new "high" FM bands followed, though as late as 1947, in Detroit, there were only 3,000 FM receivers in use for the new band, and 21,000 for the old band. The dual band transition period ended at midnight on January 8, 1949, at which time all low band transmissions had to end, making obsolete 395,000 receivers already purchased by the public for the original band. Although converters were manufactured allowing low band FM sets to receive high band transmissions, they were complicated to install and often as (or more) expensive than buying a new high band set. The greater expense was the cost for the radio stations converting to the new FM radio band. The FM radio industry did not recover significantly from the setback until the upsurge in high fidelity equipment in the late 1950s.

In the early 1960s, FM began to benefit from increased investment, as broadcasters looked to it to expand their markets; television had been built out by this point, and the shift to music as the dominant format of AM in the wake of television and the rise of rock 'n' roll had led to an AM band so crowded that the FCC was limiting many stations to daytime-only operation, a restriction to which FM was not subject. The FCC gave FM two boosts in the early 1960s: first by setting a technical standard for stereo broadcasts, and second by adopting the FM Non-Duplication Rule in 1964, prohibiting broadcasters with an AM and FM license in cities of more than 100,000 from transmitting more than 50% of the same programming on both stations.

By the end of the 1970s, 50.1% of radio listeners were listening to FM stations, ending AM's historical lead. By 1982, FM commanded 70% of the general audience, and 84% among the 12- to 24-year-old demographic. The shift in popularity of FM radio over AM in United States during the 1970s has been called by record producer Steve Greenberg "a seismic technological shift that had torn apart the very idea of the mass audience upon which pop hits depended". (AM radio would adapt by shifting its focus to talk radio, which would be deregulated in the late 1980s after the repeal of the Fairness Doctrine.)

== FM radio channel assignments in the U.S. ==
In the United States, FM broadcasting stations operate on a 20.2 MHz-wide frequency band, spanning from 87.8 MHz to 108 MHz. This is divided into 101 0.2 MHz-wide channels, which are designated as channels 200 through 300. In actual practice, few except the FCC use these channel numbers; the frequencies are used instead. (A limited number of low power TV stations have been authorized for a supplemental FM broadcast on 87.7 MHz.)

FM radio channels, established in 1945 (channel 200 was added in 1978)
| MHz | Chan No. | MHz | Chan No. | MHz | Chan No. | MHz | Chan No. | MHz | Chan No. |
|---|---|---|---|---|---|---|---|---|---|
| 87.9 | 200 | 92.9 | 225 | 97.9 | 250 | 102.9 | 275 | 107.9 | 300 |
| 88.1 | 201 | 93.1 | 226 | 98.1 | 251 | 103.1 | 276 | | |
| 88.3 | 202 | 93.3 | 227 | 98.3 | 252 | 103.3 | 277 | | |
| 88.5 | 203 | 93.5 | 228 | 98.5 | 253 | 103.5 | 278 | | |
| 88.7 | 204 | 93.7 | 229 | 98.7 | 254 | 103.7 | 279 | | |
| 88.9 | 205 | 93.9 | 230 | 98.9 | 255 | 103.9 | 280 | | |
| 89.1 | 206 | 94.1 | 231 | 99.1 | 256 | 104.1 | 281 | | |
| 89.3 | 207 | 94.3 | 232 | 99.3 | 257 | 104.3 | 282 | | |
| 89.5 | 208 | 94.5 | 233 | 99.5 | 258 | 104.5 | 283 | | |
| 89.7 | 209 | 94.7 | 234 | 99.7 | 259 | 104.7 | 284 | | |
| 89.9 | 210 | 94.9 | 235 | 99.9 | 260 | 104.9 | 285 | | |
| 90.1 | 211 | 95.1 | 236 | 100.1 | 261 | 105.1 | 286 | | |
| 90.3 | 212 | 95.3 | 237 | 100.3 | 262 | 105.3 | 287 | | |
| 90.5 | 213 | 95.5 | 238 | 100.5 | 263 | 105.5 | 288 | | |
| 90.7 | 214 | 95.7 | 239 | 100.7 | 264 | 105.7 | 289 | | |
| 90.9 | 215 | 95.9 | 240 | 100.9 | 265 | 105.9 | 290 | | |
| 91.1 | 216 | 96.1 | 241 | 101.1 | 266 | 106.1 | 291 | | |
| 91.3 | 217 | 96.3 | 242 | 101.3 | 267 | 106.3 | 292 | | |
| 91.5 | 218 | 96.5 | 243 | 101.5 | 268 | 106.5 | 293 | | |
| 91.7 | 219 | 96.7 | 244 | 101.7 | 269 | 106.7 | 294 | | |
| 91.9 | 220 | 96.9 | 245 | 101.9 | 270 | 106.9 | 295 | | |
| 92.1 | 221 | 97.1 | 246 | 102.1 | 271 | 107.1 | 296 | | |
| 92.3 | 222 | 97.3 | 247 | 102.3 | 272 | 107.3 | 297 | | |
| 92.5 | 223 | 97.5 | 248 | 102.5 | 273 | 107.5 | 298 | | |
| 92.7 | 224 | 97.7 | 249 | 102.7 | 274 | 107.7 | 299 | | |

To receive a station, an FM receiver is tuned to the center frequency of the station's channel. The lowest and almost-unused channel, channel 200, extends from 87.8 MHz to 88.0 MHz; thus its center frequency is 87.9 MHz. Channel 201 has a center frequency of 88.1 MHz, and so on, up to channel 300, which extends from 107.8 to 108.0 MHz and has a center frequency of 107.9 MHz.

Because each channel is 0.2 MHz wide, the center frequencies of adjacent channels differ by 0.2 MHz. Because the lowest channel is centered on 87.9 MHz, the tenths digit (in MHz) of the center frequency of any FM station in the United States is always an odd number. FM audio for analog television channel 6 is broadcast at a carrier frequency of 87.75 MHz, and many radios can tune this low; full-power stations ceased analog operations in 2009 under FCC orders, but a very small amount of low-power stations are still operated solely for their right to use this frequency for broadcasting an FM audio carrier signal along with an ATSC 3.0 digital signal broadcasting programming. For the same reason, assignment restrictions between TV stations on channel 6 and nearby FM stations are stringent: there is only one station in the United States (CSN International translator K200AA in Sun Valley, Nevada) licensed to operate on 87.9 MHz, because it was forced off of another channel. Therefore, in effect, the FM broadcast band comprises only FM channels 201 (88.1 MHz) through 300 (107.9 MHz).

Originally, FM stations in a market were generally spaced four channels (800 kHz) apart. This spacing was developed in response to problems perceived on the original FM band, mostly due to deficiencies in receiver technology of the time. With modern equipment, this is widely understood to be unnecessary, and in many countries shorter spacings are used. (See FM broadcast band.) Other spacing restrictions relate to mixing products with nearby television, air-traffic control, and two-way radio systems as well as other FM broadcast stations. The most significant such taboo restricts the allocation of stations 10.6 and 10.8 MHz apart, to protect against mixing products which will interfere with an FM receiver's standard 10.7 MHz intermediate frequency stage.

Commercial broadcasting is licensed only on channels 221 through 300 (the upper 80 channels, frequencies between 92.1 and 107.9 MHz), with 200 through 220 (the lower 21 channels, frequencies between 87.9 and 91.9 MHz) reserved for non-commercial educational (NCE) broadcasting. In some "Twin city" markets close to the Canada–United States or Mexico–United States border, such as Detroit, Michigan, and Windsor, Ontario, or San Diego, California, and Tijuana, Baja California, commercial stations operating from those countries target U.S. audiences on "reserved band" channels, as neither Canada nor Mexico has such a reservation. Because of this necessary sharing, the FCC reserves a few other channels for such NCE stations.

FM stations in the U.S. are now assigned based on a table of separation distance values from currently licensed stations, based on station "class" (power output, antenna height, and geographical location). These regulations (see Docket 80-90) have resulted in approximately double the number of possible stations, and increases in allowable power levels, over the original bandplan scheme described above. All powers are specified as effective radiated power (ERP), which takes into account the magnifying effect (gain) of certain antenna types.

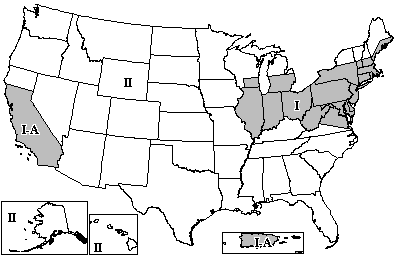
FM broadcast zones in the U.S.

The U.S. is divided into Zone I (roughly the northeastern quarter of the U.S. mainland, excluding the far northern areas), Zone I-A (California south of 40 degrees latitude, U.S. Virgin Islands, Puerto Rico), and Zone II (all other locations). The highest-power stations are class C in zone II, and class B in the others. There are no B stations in zone II, nor any C stations in the others. (See the list of broadcast station classes.) Canada is also divided in this manner, based on the most highly populated regions.

High power is useful in penetrating buildings, diffracting around hills, and refracting for some distance beyond the horizon. 100,000-watt FM stations can regularly be heard up to 100 miles (160 km) away, and farther (e.g., 150 miles, 240 km) if there are no competing signals.

A few old "grandfathered" stations do not conform to these power rules. WBCT (93.7) in Grand Rapids, Michigan, runs 320,000 watts ERP, and can increase to 500,000 watts ERP by the terms of its original license. This huge power level does not usually help to increase range as much as one might expect, because VHF frequencies travel in nearly straight lines over the horizon and off into space. Nevertheless, when there were fewer FM stations competing, this station could be heard near Bloomington, Illinois, almost 300 miles (480 km) distant.

== See also ==
- FM broadcasting
- FM broadcast band
- AM broadcasting
- AM stereo
- List of broadcast station classes
- History of radio
- RDS (Radio Data System)
- Oldest radio station
