= KE2XCC =

Experimental radio station in Alpine, New Jersey

KE2XCC, first authorized in 1945 with the call sign W2XEA, was an experimental FM radio station located in Alpine, New Jersey, and operated by inventor Edwin Howard Armstrong. It was located at the same site as Armstrong's original FM station, W2XMN, which dated to the late 1930s and primarily transmitted on the original FM "low band" frequencies. W2XEA was established as a companion station operating on the new FM "high band", which had been recently designated by the Federal Communications Commission as the replacement for the original FM station assignments. W2XMN shut down in 1949 after the "low band" was eliminated, and at this time W2XEA changed its call sign to KE2XCC and took over most of the functions previously performed by W2XMN.

W2XEA was originally assigned to transmit on 92.1 MHz. This was changed in 1948 to 93.1 MHz, where it remained, as KE2XCC, until it ceased operations shortly after Armstrong's death in early 1954. In addition to general broadcasting to promote FM's popularity, the station was used to conduct the research that led to Armstrong's introduction of a new multiplexing transmitting system in 1953.

== History ==
=== W2XEA ===
On June 27, 1945, the Federal Communications Commission (FCC) announced that due to interference concerns it was reallocating the existing FM "low band" frequencies to other services, with 42–44 MHz going to "non-government fixed and mobile", and 44–50 MHz allocated to television channel 1. (The TV allocation was later reassigned as additional "non-government fixed and mobile" frequencies.) This in turn meant that existing FM band stations would be relocated to 88-106 MHz (later expanded to 108 MHz). Edwin Howard Armstrong, the inventor of "wide band" FM, had strenuously objected to this move when it was still a proposal under review for being unnecessarily disruptive. However, at the time of its adoption he also announced that to help ease the transition he had developed the technology needed for stations to simultaneously broadcast on both their original "low band" and new "high band" frequencies. Armstrong already had authorizations for two "low band" stations, W2XMN and WFMN, operating from a common site in Alpine, New Jersey, a few kilometers north of New York City. On August 6, 1945, he was issued an initial authorization for W2XEA as a third station located at Alpine, operating under an experimental grant with 50,000 watts on the "high band" frequency of 92.1 MHz.

Armstrong continued to vigorously fight the pending move to the "high band" on the grounds that it was not technically needed, and also because stations operating on the higher frequencies had reduced coverage. Thus, part of W2XEA's purpose was to document the limitations of "high band" transmissions. In early 1948 a Stromberg-Carlson executive, listening from a location in upstate New York, testified that "It has been my personal experience that the 44- to 50-megacycle band gives more reliable reception for rural and regional FM than the 88- to 108-megacycle band" and "reception from W2XMN, Alpine, N. J., in the low band was almost always satisfactory, while W2XEA, Alpine, N. J., same power, same location, in the high band was frequently subject to serious fading or not receivable at all". In addition, a Massachusetts Institute of Technology study comparing simultaneous reception from August 1947 to December 1948 of W2XMN on 44.1 MHz and W2XEA on 92.1 MHz found that "in general, reception at the higher of these two frequencies has been inferior to that of the lower frequency". (In August 1947, it was reported that W2XEA on 92.1 MHz was currently operating with a power "of approximately 20 kw", while W2XMN was on 44.1 MHz with "approximately 30 kw".)

WFMN later moved to the "high band", and in mid-1947 was assigned to 93.1 MHz. However, in contrast to W2XEA, WFMN appears to have rarely, if ever, to have actually made broadcasts, and in late 1948 W2XEA was reassigned "at FCC's request" from 92.1 MHz to also operate on WFMN's unused frequency of 93.1 MHz.

=== KE2XCC ===
In December 1948 the FCC ordered that all remaining "low band" FM stations, including W2XMN, had to shut down by the end of the month. Armstrong disputed this in the courts and received a temporary stay issued by the District of Columbia Court of Appeals. However, the appeal was ultimately unsuccessful, and W2XMN ended operations in July 1949. Effective July 5, 1949 W2XEA's call sign was changed to KE2XCC, and it became Armstrong's main station for developmental research and also conducted an extensive and prominent schedule of regular broadcasting for the New York City area.

WFMN continued to remain off the air in deference to KE2XCC, and was issued a continuous series of "Special Temporary Authority" (STA) grants allowing it to "remain silent". The last reported STA covered until February 1, 1953, and specified "Granted extension of STA for period ending Feb. 1, 1953, to suspend regular broadcasting service of WFMN and to operate Class I Experimental Station KE2XCC using its regularly licensed equipment, power and emission on the additional frequency of 93.1 mc for providing FM program service and to rebroadcast over station KE2XCC transmissions of WJLK-FM Asbury Park, N. J., WGPA-FM Bethlehem, Pa., and WNYC-FM New York."

In October 1953 Armstrong made a public demonstration of a multiplexing system that had been developed at KE2XCC, which provided for separate audio and data to be transmitted in addition to a station's standard programming.

Armstrong committed suicide on February 1, 1954. The Continental (fm) Network, for which Armstrong had been paying the charges for a key telephone link from Washington to New York, suspended operations on the next day. Following a memorial program broadcast on the evening of March 6, KE2XCC also ended operations, and the station was formally deleted by the FCC on November 22, 1954. In 1957, WPAT-FM in Paterson, New Jersey began operating on its vacated 93.1 MHz frequency.

== See also ==
- Armstrong Tower
