= Larry Robbins =

American financier (born 1969)

- Born: October 22, 1969 (age 56); Arlington Heights, Illinois, United States
- Education: University of Pennsylvania
- Occupation: Hedge fund manager
- Known for: Founding and managing Glenview Capital Management; Former owner of the Chicago Steel
- Spouses: Amy Towers (divorced); Sarahmay Wesemael (m. 2012)
- Children: 4 sons

Larry Robbins (born October 22, 1969) is an American hedge fund manager and philanthropist. He is the chief executive of Glenview Capital Management, a hedge fund with approximately $7.7 billion of capital under management as of March 2019.

== Early life and education ==
Robbins grew up in a Jewish family in Arlington Heights, Illinois. He graduated with honors from the Jerome Fisher Program in Management and Technology at the University of Pennsylvania in 1992, where he received a B.S. in economics with concentrations in accounting, finance, marketing and a B.S in engineering, with a major in systems engineering. Robbins played hockey throughout college and was captain of the University of Pennsylvania club team for three years. Robbins became a Certified Public Accountant in 1991 in Illinois.

== Investment career ==
After graduation, Robbins worked at Gleacher & Company, a merger and advisory boutique in New York. He joined Leon Cooperman at Omega Advisors after three years at Gleacher. Robbins spent six years as an analyst and partner at Omega Advisors on their US equity long/short team. Robbins left Omega to start Glenview Capital Management in 2000, named after the suburban Chicago hockey area where he started playing hockey at age five. In 2012, he made a successful bet by investing in hospital companies that he thought would benefit from Obamacare. Unlike most hedge funds, Robbins is known for holding stocks for years and not employing stop-losses. Robbins is currently the firm's CEO and portfolio manager.

== Personal life ==
Robbins has four sons, by his first wife Amy Towers, who he later divorced. In 2012, he married his second wife, Sarahmay Wesemael. He lives in Alpine, New Jersey but has recently relocated to South Florida. Robbins is the owner of the Chicago Steel of the USHL.

== Wealth and philanthropy ==
Robbins serves as chairman of the board for both the Knowledge is Power Program (KIPP) New York and Relay Graduate School of Education. He is a member of the board of directors for The Robin Hood Foundation and chairs the education committee. He is a member of the board of directors for Teach For America (New York) and was an honoree at the 2013 Annual Benefit Dinner. Through their Robbins Family Foundation, Larry and his wife Sarahmay are active supporters of education reform both in New York City and across the US. In addition, Robbins is the Senior Chair of the Wall Street Division of the UJA-Federation and the recipient of the 2007 Young Leadership Award.

In 2014, Robbins reportedly earned $570 million (including his share of his firm's management and performance fees, cash compensation and stock and option awards).
