= FM broadcasting in Canada =

The history of FM broadcasting started just after World War II ended, but the experimental FM network did not begin until the 1960s.

== Domestic FM networks ==
The Canadian Broadcasting Corporation's (CBC) first FM outlets were built in Montreal for English and French service (two stations), and one each in Toronto, Ottawa and Vancouver.

At least one station, CKOI-FM in Montreal, is licensed for over 300 kW (307,000 watts).

== Regulation of Canadian content ==
One of the more contentious parts of Canadian broadcast history is the Canadian content (Cancon) requirements. Launched in 1970, to maintain a sense of Canadian stations being "Canadian", it required 35% of all broadcast content be of Canadian origin. With music, a special system was created to clarify what is considered Canadian content and what isn't. Last modified in 1991, most compact discs and cassettes in Canada come with the MAPL symbol on them.

Canadian content is calculated by a simple circle divided into four parts (M, A, P and L). Two of the four parts must be shaded to be considered Canadian content.

- M = Music
- A = Artist
- P = Producer
- L = Lyrics

In the late 1990s and into the 2000s, there was a migration of Canadian AM stations to FM broadcasting. In some cases, the AM channel has been left idle; in others "specialized" stations have taken over.

== Community broadcasting ==
Most Canadian cities of 50,000 or more people tend to have a community radio station. Typically these stations operate between 1000 W to 5000 W on FM.

== Aboriginal broadcasting ==
=== FM regulatory aspects ===
In 1991, Section 3 of the Broadcasting Act was amended to state that "the Canadian broadcasting system ... should ... reflect ... the special place of Aboriginal peoples within (Canadian) society ... ", and that " ... programming that reflects the Aboriginal cultures of Canada should be provided within the Canadian broadcasting system as resources become available for the purpose."

Aboriginal broadcasting has been mostly a post 1980s phenomena in Canada, and has only had formal regulatory support since the 1990s. Mostly the broadcasting has been on the FM band, as the AM band in Canada is mostly full and has been at capacity due to US night-time MW signals reaching into Canada.

=== Mileposts in aboriginal broadcasting ===
Aboriginal broadcasting in Canada is mostly on the FM band.

In June 2000, the Canadian Radio-television and Telecommunications Commission (CRTC) announced that Aboriginal Voices Radio had been granted a licence for a station in Toronto, with transmitter on the CN Tower.

While only 2% of the content would be in Aboriginal languages, the CRTC stipulated that the programming should be " ... oriented to the native population, and reflect the specific interests and needs of that audience."

In October 2000, Aboriginal Voices applied for a licence to operate a radio network for First Nations audiences, and the application was granted in February 2001. AVR was later granted licences for stations in Ottawa, Calgary, Vancouver, Kitchener-Waterloo and Montreal.

Separately from Aboriginal Voices, numerous smaller First Nations radio stations operate in local communities, although each often serves a large geographic region through the use of rebroadcast transmitters. Such operations include CFNR-FM in Northern British Columbia, the Missinipi Broadcasting Corporation in Saskatchewan, CFWE-FM in Alberta, the Wawatay Native Communications Society in Northwestern Ontario and the Taqramiut Nipingat network in Quebec.

== Station identification ==
Historical notes

- The International Telecommunication Union (ITU) originally assigned the call letter blocks VAA to VGZ to Canada. UWA-UZZ was also assigned to Canada, but deleted in 1934.
- In 1934, Canada was assigned the blocks CFA-CKZ and VXA-VYZ originally assigned to "Great Britain and protectorates," and CYA-CZZ originally assigned to Mexico.

Current practices

- Newfoundland and Labrador was assigned VOA-VOZ, and was assimilated into Canada's assignment when Newfoundland became part of Canada on April 1, 1949.
- Canadian stations normally use call letters from the CFAA-CFZZ and CHAA-CKZZ blocks.

== Current subcarrier services ==
These are currently permitted subcarrier services, as allowed by the CRTC

- Radio Data System
- Directband
