= Armstrong Tower =

Radio tower in Alpine, New Jersey

Coordinates: 40°57′39″N 73°55′21″W

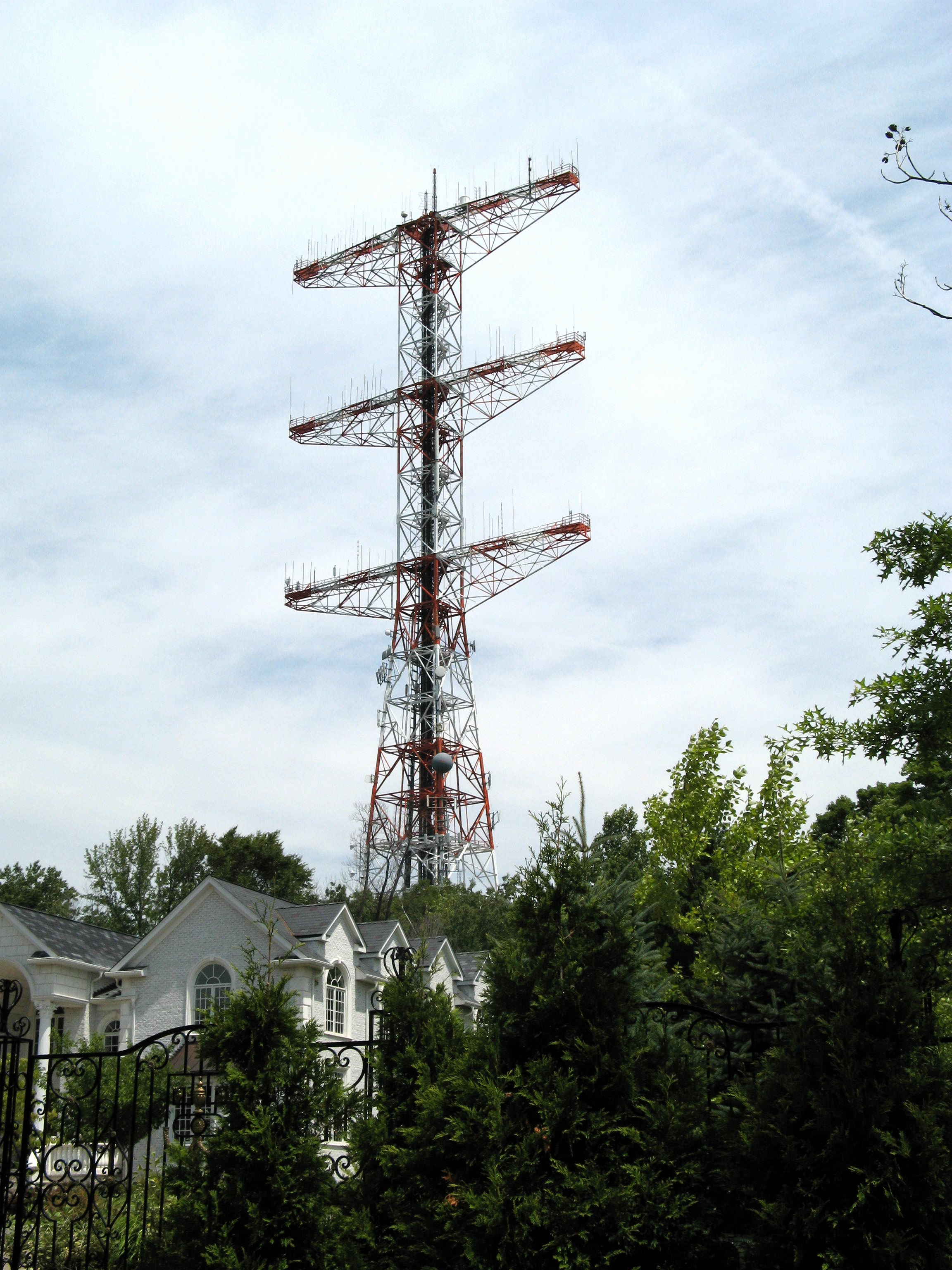
Armstrong Tower, Alpine, New Jersey

The Armstrong Tower, also known as Alpine Tower, is a distinctive 129.5 meter (425 foot) tall lattice tower featuring three large cross-arms, located atop the Alpine, New Jersey palisades overlooking the Hudson River a few kilometers north of New York City at 40°57'39.0" N and 73°55'21.0" W (40.9607 -73.9225). It is owned by Alpine Tower Company and managed by CSC Management, LLC, both owned by Charles E. Sackermann, Jr.

The tower is the permanent transmitter site for locally based experimental station WA2XMN and Fairleigh Dickinson University's educational FM station WFDU, in additional to numerous directional radio services (including as a cell site). It is clearly visible from across the Hudson River and is used as a Visual flight rules waypoint by aircraft flying within the New York City Special flight rules area.

The tower was originally constructed by inventor Edwin Howard Armstrong in 1938 for developmental activities that led to modern FM radio. The original transmissions (W2XMN) occurred at 42.8 MHz. At the tower base is a building originally used for research by Armstrong, which still has the W2XMN call sign engraved above its main entrance. This building currently houses the Armstrong Field Laboratory, and serves as a museum containing artifacts from the development of FM radio technology.

The structure was also used as a temporary transmitter site for some of New York City's television stations after the collapse of the World Trade Center, including its transmitting antenna, following the September 11, 2001 attacks.

== See also ==
- Lattice tower
- List of towers
- List of famous transmission sites
