= Glenview Capital Management =

Hedge fund in New York, US

- Company type: Privately Held
- Industry: Investment Management
- Founded: September 15, 2000
- Headquarters: 767 Fifth Avenue, New York, New York 10153
- Area served: Worldwide
- Key people: Larry Robbins, Founder, CEO, Portfolio Manager
- AUM: US $7.7 billion (2019)
- Number of employees: 77 (2020)

Glenview Capital Management is a hedge fund founded in 2000.As of March 2019, it managed approximately $7.7 billion in assets. Glenview manages capital for investors through a series of private investment funds. The firm was founded by Larry Robbins, the firm's CEO and portfolio manager, and is based in New York.

== History ==
Robbins left Omega Advisors in 2000 to form Glenview Capital Management, named after the suburban Chicago area where he started playing hockey at age five.

== Investment products and strategies ==
Glenview's investing strategy is commonly related to Growth at a Reasonable Price (GARP). The firm focuses on companies in stable industries with recurring revenue streams or entrenched market positions.

Glenview's flagship funds which launched in 2001 employ a long/short strategy focused on investments in equity and fixed income securities. In 2007, Glenview launched the Glenview Opportunity or "GO" funds which employ an opportunistic investment approach. Across these two strategies, Glenview manages the following investment funds: Glenview Capital Partners, L.P., Glenview Institutional Partners, L.P., Glenview Capital Partners (Cayman), Ltd., Glenview Capital Opportunity Fund, L.P. and Glenview Offshore Opportunity Fund, Ltd.

In 2013, the firm placed number one on the Bloomberg Markets annual ranking of best performing large hedge funds due to the Glenview Capital Opportunity Fund, which saw an 84% gain through October 2013.

== Investment history ==
Glenview holds investments in a broad range of industries including healthcare, industrials, consumer services and technology companies.

In 2013, Health Management Associates (HMA) and Community Health Systems announced that they had agreed to a $3.9 billion merger. Owning a 14.6% stake in HMA, Glenview objected to the terms of the deal and submitted consents from a majority of HMA shareholders to replace the entire Board of Directors. The merger was completed in January 2014.

In 2016, Glenview became the largest shareholder in hospital chain Tenet Healthcare with a 17.8% stake in the company.

In 2017, after Dow Chemical engaged in merger discussions with DuPont, Glenview and other shareholders pushed for changes to the plan of how the combined company, DowDuPont, would be broken up.

In 2018, Cigna announced that the company had agreed to buy Express Scripts for $67 billion. After activist investor Carl Icahn called the deal a "$60 billion folly," Glenview declared its support of the transaction in a letter to Cigna shareholders, urging other investors to do the same. The merger was approved in August 2018.
