= Alpine, New Jersey =

Borough in Bergen County, New Jersey, US

- Borough
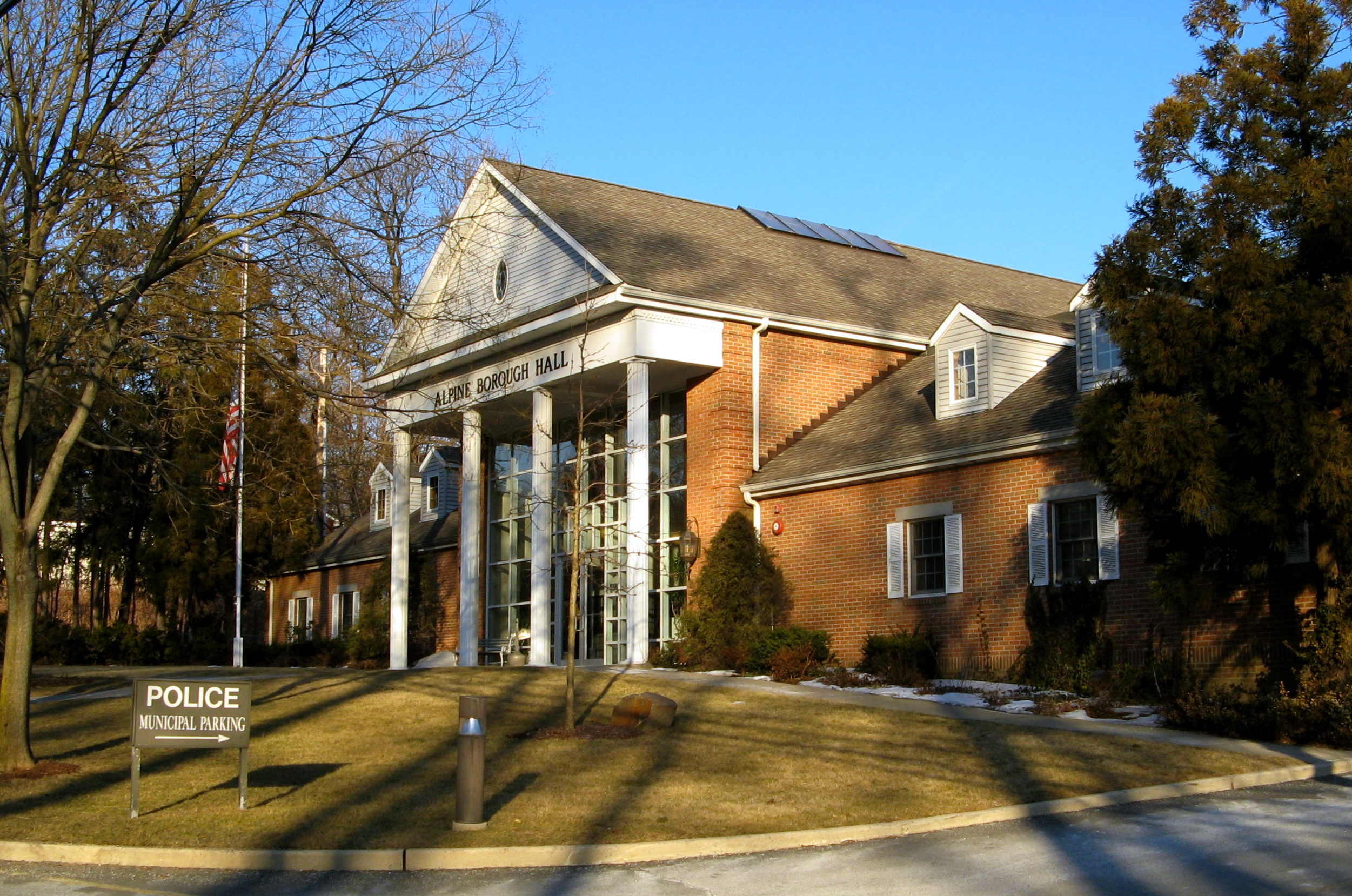
- Alpine Borough Hall, Post Office and police station

- Location of Alpine in Bergen County highlighted in red (left). Inset map: Location of Bergen County in New Jersey highlighted in orange (right).

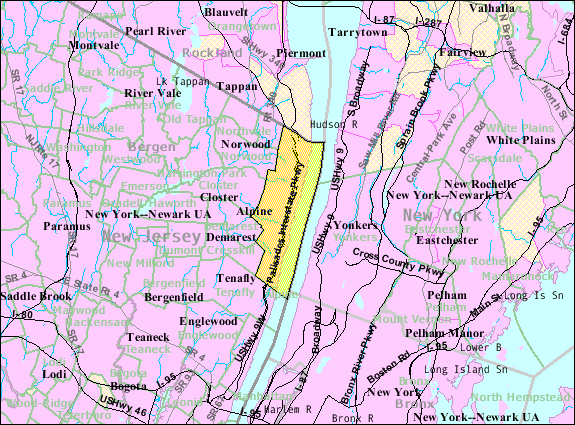
- Census Bureau map of Alpine, New Jersey

- Location in Bergen County Location in New Jersey Location in the United States
- Coordinates: 40.968782°N 73.916896°W
- Country: United States
- State: New Jersey
- County: Bergen
- Incorporated: April 8, 1903
- Named for: The Alps

Government
  - Type: Borough
  - Body: Borough Council
  - Mayor: Paul H. Tomasko (D, term ends December 31, 2026)
  - Municipal clerk: Stephanie Wehmann

Area
  - Total: 9.27 sq mi (24.01 km^{2})
  - Land: 6.40 sq mi (16.58 km^{2})
  - Water: 2.87 sq mi (7.43 km^{2}) 30.61%
  - Rank: 218th of 565 in state 4th of 70 in county
- Elevation: 518 ft (158 m)

Population (2020)
  - Total: 1,762
  - Estimate (2023): 1,750
  - Rank: 497th of 565 in state 68th of 70 in county
  - Density: 275.3/sq mi (106.3/km^{2})
  - Rank: 483rd of 565 in state 69th of 70 in county
- Time zone: UTC−05:00 (Eastern (EST))
  - Summer (DST): UTC−04:00 (Eastern (EDT))
- ZIP Code: 07620
- Area codes: 201 exchanges: 750, 767, 768, 784.
- FIPS code: 3400301090
- GNIS feature ID: 0885139
- Website: www.alpinenj07620.org

Alpine is a borough in Bergen County, in the U.S. state of New Jersey, approximately 15 miles (24 km) north of Midtown Manhattan. It is the easternmost town in New Jersey.

As of the 2020 United States census, the borough's population was 1,762, a decrease of 87 (−4.7%) from the 2010 census count of 1,849, which in turn reflected a decline of 334 (−15.3%) from the 2,183 counted in the 2000 census.

In 2012, Forbes ranked Alpine as America's most expensive ZIP Code with a median home price of $4.25 million. It was ranked 4th in the magazine's 2010 listing of "America's Most Expensive ZIP Codes", with a median home price of $3,814,885. In 2009, Forbes ranked Alpine first, along with Greenwich, Connecticut, with a median home price of $4.14 million. Alpine was tied with Greenwich for first in both 2006 and 2007 on the ABC News list of most expensive ZIP Codes, with a median home sale price of $3.4 million. In 2019, PropertyShark ranked Alpine as the 53rd most expensive ZIP Code in the country with a median sales price of $1,785,000, a drop from a ranking of 33rd nationwide in 2018 due to a decline of 19% in sales prices. Based on data from the 2006–2010 American Community Survey, the borough had a per-capita income of $107,604, ranked second in the state.

New Jersey Monthly magazine ranked Alpine as its 15th best place to live in its 2008 rankings of the "Best Places To Live" in New Jersey.

Alpine was formed by an act of the New Jersey Legislature on April 8, 1903, from portions of Harrington Township. The borough acquired a portion of Cresskill in 1904. The borough's name came from the wife of journalist Charles Nordhoff, who found the setting reminiscent of the Swiss Alps.

== Geography ==
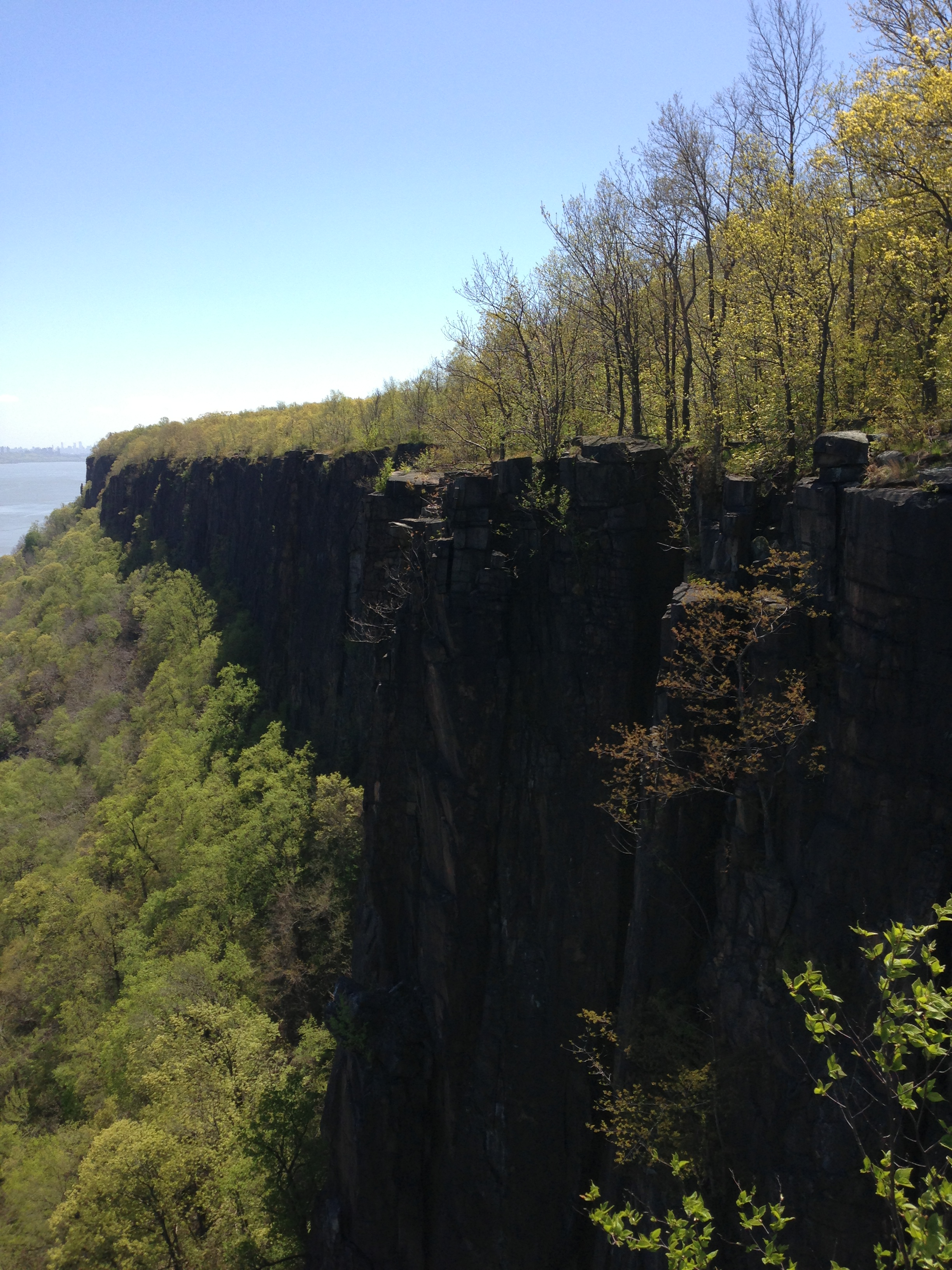
View south along the Palisades from Ruckman's Point in Palisades Interstate Park

The borough has a total area of 9.22 square miles (23.89 km^{2}), including 6.40 square miles (16.58 km^{2}) of land and 2.82 square miles (7.31 km^{2}) of water (30.61%).

The borough borders Closter, Cresskill, Demarest, Norwood, Rockleigh and Tenafly in Bergen County. At the east, the borough borders the Hudson River, across from which lies The Bronx in New York City, and in Westchester County the city of Yonkers and the village of Hastings-on-Hudson (within the town of Greenburgh). At the north, where Alpine forms part of New Jersey's northern border with New York state, the borough borders the hamlet of Tappan (in the town of Orangetown) in Rockland County.

== Demographics ==
Historical population
Census	Pop.	Note	%±
1900	268		—
1910	377		40.7%
1920	350		−7.2%
1930	521		48.9%
1940	626		20.2%
1950	644		2.9%
1960	921		43.0%
1970	1,344		45.9%
1980	1,549		15.3%
1990	1,716		10.8%
2000	2,183		27.2%
2010	1,849		−15.3%
2020	1,762		−4.7%
2023 (est.)	1,750	▼	−0.7%
Population sources: 1910–1920 1910 1910–1930; 1900–2020 2000; 2010 2020

=== 2020 census ===
Alpine borough, Bergen County, New Jersey – Racial and ethnic composition Note: the US Census treats Hispanic/Latino as an ethnic category. This table excludes Latinos from the racial categories and assigns them to a separate category. Hispanics/Latinos may be of any race.
Race / Ethnicity (NH = Non-Hispanic)	Pop 2000	Pop 2010	Pop 2020	% 2000	% 2010	% 2020
White alone (NH)	1,647	1,197	949	75.45%	64.74%	53.86%
Black or African American alone (NH)	33	44	54	1.51%	2.38%	3.06%
Native American or Alaska Native alone (NH)	5	1	0	0.23%	0.05%	0.00%
Asian alone (NH)	416	482	593	19.06%	26.07%	33.65%
Native Hawaiian or Pacific Islander alone (NH)	1	0	0	0.05%	0.00%	0.00%
Other race alone (NH)	0	1	5	0.00%	0.05%	0.28%
Mixed race or Multiracial (NH)	26	35	40	1.19%	1.89%	2.27%
Hispanic or Latino (any race)	55	89	121	2.52%	4.81%	6.87%
Total	2,183	1,849	1,762	100.00%	100.00%	100.00%

=== 2010 census ===
The 2010 United States census counted 1,849 people, 611 households, and 529 families in the borough. The population density was 288.4 per square mile (111.4/km^{2}). There were 670 housing units at an average density of 104.5 per square mile (40.3/km^{2}). The racial makeup was 68.14% (1,260) White, 2.38% (44) Black or African American, 0.05% (1) Native American, 26.07% (482) Asian, 0.00% (0) Pacific Islander, 1.30% (24) from other races, and 2.06% (38) from two or more races. Hispanic or Latino of any race were 4.81% (89) of the population.

Of the 611 households, 32.9% had children under the age of 18; 73.8% were married couples living together; 8.2% had a female householder with no husband present and 13.4% were non-families. Of all households, 11.8% were made up of individuals and 4.9% had someone living alone who was 65 years of age or older. The average household size was 3.03 and the average family size was 3.24.

22.6% of the population were under the age of 18, 6.1% from 18 to 24, 16.0% from 25 to 44, 36.2% from 45 to 64, and 19.1% who were 65 years of age or older. The median age was 48.2 years. For every 100 females, the population had 101.9 males. For every 100 females ages 18 and older there were 100.4 males.

The Census Bureau's 2006–2010 American Community Survey showed that (in 2010 inflation-adjusted dollars) median household income was $172,054 (with a margin of error of +/− $23,256) and the median family income was $192,188 (+/− $56,076). Males had a median income of $124,375 (+/− $28,708) versus $56,719 (+/− $21,358) for females. The per capita income for the borough was $107,604 (+/− $18,758). About 2.3% of families and 3.4% of the population were below the poverty line, including 4.6% of those under age 18 and 2.0% of those age 65 or over.

Same-sex couples headed four households in 2010, down from the eight counted in the 2000 Census.

=== 2000 census ===
As of the 2000 United States census there were 2,183 people, 708 households, and 623 families residing in the borough. The population density was 343.5 inhabitants per square mile (132.6/km^{2}). There were 730 housing units at an average density of 114.9 per square mile (44.4/km^{2}). The racial makeup of the borough was 77.37% White, 1.51% African American, 0.23% Native American, 19.10% Asian, 0.05% Pacific Islander, 0.32% from other races, and 1.42% from two or more races. Hispanic or Latino of any race were 2.52% of the population.

There were 708 households, out of which 36.3% had children under the age of 18 living with them, 79.8% were married couples living together, 4.8% had a female householder with no husband present, and 12.0% were non-families. 9.9% of all households were made up of individuals, and 4.2% had someone living alone who was 65 years of age or older. The average household size was 3.08 and the average family size was 3.24.

In the borough the population was spread out, with 24.7% under the age of 18, 5.4% from 18 to 24, 20.9% from 25 to 44, 34.2% from 45 to 64, and 14.8% who were 65 years of age or older. The median age was 44 years. For every 100 females, there were 102.3 males. For every 100 females age 18 and over, there were 94.8 males.

The median income for a household in the borough was $130,740, and the median income for a family was $134,068. Males had a median income of $87,544 versus $45,536 for females. The per capita income for the borough was $76,995. 6.2% of the population and 5.4% of families were below the poverty line. Out of the total people living in poverty, 8.5% were under the age of 18 and 6.4% were 65 or older.

== Government ==
=== Local government ===
Alpine is governed under the borough form of New Jersey municipal government, which is used in 218 municipalities (of the 564) statewide, making it the most common form of government in New Jersey. The governing body is comprised of a mayor and a borough council, with all positions elected at-large on a partisan basis as part of the November general election. A mayor is elected directly by the voters to a four-year term of office. The borough council includes six members elected to serve three-year terms on a staggered basis, with two seats coming up for election each year in a three-year cycle.

The borough form of government used by Alpine is a "weak mayor / strong council" government in which council members act as the legislative body with the mayor presiding at meetings and voting only in the event of a tie. The mayor can veto ordinances subject to an override by a two-thirds majority vote of the council. The mayor makes committee and liaison assignments for council members, and most appointments are made by the mayor with the advice and consent of the council.

As of 2026, the mayor of Alpine is Democrat Paul H. Tomasko, whose term of office ends December 31, 2026. Members of the Alpine Borough Council are Council President Arthur I. Frankel (D, 2026) George Abad (D, 2027), Scott Bosworth (D, 2028), Steven Cohen (D, 2027), Keren Barbi (D, 2026) and David Kupferschmid (R, 2026).

In August 2022, David Kupferschmid was appointed to fill the seat expiring in December 2023 that had been held by Laurence A. Shadek until he resigned from office the previous month.

In February 2021 the borough council appointed Scott Bosworth from a list of three candidates nominated by the Republican municipal committee to fill the council seat expiring in December 2022 that had been held by John Halbreich until he resigned from office earlier that month. Bosworth served on an interim basis until the November 2021 general election, when he was elected to serve the balance of the term of office.

Joan Ornstein was appointed by the borough council in February 2012 to fill the vacant seat of her husband Steve, who had died the previous month after being sworn in for a three-year term of office.

In 2018, the borough had an average property tax bill of $21,299, the highest in the county, compared to an average bill of $8,767 statewide.

=== Federal, state and county representation ===
Alpine is located in the 5th Congressional District and is part of New Jersey's 39th state legislative district.

For the 119th United States Congress, New Jersey's 5th congressional district is represented by Josh Gottheimer (D, Wyckoff). New Jersey is represented in the United States Senate by Democrats Cory Booker (Newark, term ends 2027) and Andy Kim (Moorestown, term ends 2031).

For the 2026–2027 session, the 39th legislative district of the New Jersey Legislature is represented in the State Senate by Holly Schepisi (R, River Vale) and in the General Assembly by Robert Auth (R, Old Tappan) and John V. Azzariti (R, Saddle River).

Bergen County is governed by a directly elected County Executive, with legislative functions performed by a Board of County Commissioners comprised of seven members who are elected at-large to three-year terms in partisan elections on a staggered basis, with either two or three seats coming up for election each November; a Chairman and Vice Chairman are selected from among its seven members at a reorganization meeting held every January. As of 2025, the county executive is James J. Tedesco III (D, Paramus), whose four-year term of office ends December 31, 2026.

Bergen County's Commissioners are Chair Mary J. Amoroso (D, Mahwah, 2025), Vice Chair Steven A. Tanelli (D, North Arlington, 2027), Chair Pro Tem Joan Voss (D, Fort Lee, 2026), Rafael Marte (D, Bergenfield, 2026), Germaine M. Ortiz (D, Emerson, 2025), Thomas J. Sullivan Jr. (D, Montvale, 2025) and Tracy Silna Zur (D, Franklin Lakes, 2027).

Bergen County's elected constitutional officials are Clerk John S. Hogan (D, Northvale, 2026), Sheriff Anthony Cureton (D, Englewood, 2027) and Surrogate Michael R. Dressler (D, Cresskill, 2026).

=== Politics ===
Presidential election results

United States presidential election results for Alpine
Year	Republican		Democratic		Third party(ies)	
Year	No.	%	No.	%	No.	%
2024	517	54.88%	413	43.84%	12	1.27%
2020	510	47.00%	566	52.17%	9	0.83%
2016	419	46.45%	458	50.78%	25	2.77%
2012	522	59.66%	342	39.09%	11	1.26%
2008	532	54.62%	434	44.56%	8	0.82%
2004	588	56.16%	451	43.08%	8	0.76%
2000	513	52.67%	438	44.97%	23	2.36%
1996	481	54.91%	335	38.24%	60	6.85%
1992	529	54.93%	313	32.50%	121	12.56%
1988	614	70.17%	258	29.49%	3	0.34%
1984	660	76.21%	204	23.56%	2	0.23%
1980	565	67.50%	185	22.10%	87	10.39%
1976	499	66.18%	244	32.36%	11	1.46%
1972	465	68.28%	212	31.13%	4	0.59%
1968	384	64.11%	189	31.55%	26	4.34%
1964	290	53.51%	252	46.49%	0	0.00%
1960	370	71.57%	147	28.43%	0	0.00%

As of March 2011, there were a total of 1,352 registered voters in Alpine, of which 341 (25.2% vs. 31.7% countywide) were registered as Democrats, 372 (27.5% vs. 21.1%) were registered as Republicans and 638 (47.2% vs. 47.1%) were registered as Unaffiliated. There was one voter registered to another party. Among the borough's 2010 Census population, 73.1% (vs. 57.1% in Bergen County) were registered to vote, including 94.5% of those ages 18 and over (vs. 73.7% countywide).

In the 2016 presidential election, Democrat Hillary Clinton received 458 votes (50.8% vs. 54.8% countywide), ahead of Republican Donald Trump with 419 votes (46.5% vs. 41.6% countywide) and other candidates with 25 votes (2.7% vs. 3.7% countywide), among the 902 ballots cast by the borough's 1,480 registered voters for a turnout of 60.9% (vs. 73% in Bergen County). In the 2012 presidential election, Republican Mitt Romney received 522 votes (59.0% vs. 43.5% countywide), ahead of Democrat Barack Obama with 342 votes (38.6% vs. 54.8%) and other candidates with 9 votes (1.0% vs. 0.9%), among the 885 ballots cast by the borough's 1,416 registered voters, for a turnout of 62.5% (vs. 70.4% in Bergen County).

Gubernatorial election results for Alpine
Year	Republican		Democratic		Third party(ies)	
Year	No.	%	No.	%	No.	%
2025	390	57.78%	283	41.93%	2	0.30%
2021	310	58.82%	214	40.61%	3	0.57%
2017	229	53.01%	199	46.06%	4	0.93%
2013	348	76.15%	106	23.19%	3	0.66%
2009	328	55.41%	227	38.34%	37	6.25%
2005	297	51.56%	276	47.92%	3	0.52%

In the 2017 gubernatorial election, Republican Kim Guadagno received 53.0% of the vote (229 cast), ahead of Democrat Phil Murphy with 46.1% (199 votes), and other candidates with 0.9% (4 votes), among the 436 ballots cast by the borough's 1,416 registered voters (4 ballots were spoiled), for a turnout of 30.8%. In the 2013 gubernatorial election, Republican Chris Christie received 76.1% of the vote (348 cast), ahead of Democrat Barbara Buono with 23.2% (106 votes), and other candidates with 0.7% (3 votes), among the 465 ballots cast by the borough's 1,347 registered voters (8 ballots were spoiled), for a turnout of 34.5%. In the 2009 gubernatorial election, Republican Chris Christie received 328 votes (54.8% vs. 45.8% countywide), ahead of Democrat Jon Corzine with 227 votes (37.9% vs. 48.0%), Independent Chris Daggett with 34 votes (5.7% vs. 4.7%) and other candidates with 3 votes (0.5% vs. 0.5%), among the 599 ballots cast by the borough's 1,347 registered voters, yielding a 44.5% turnout (vs. 50.0% in the county).

United States Senate election results for Alpine1
Year	Republican		Democratic		Third party(ies)	
Year	No.	%	No.	%	No.	%
2024	503	54.61%	405	43.97%	13	1.41%
2018	322	50.47%	307	48.12%	9	1.41%
2012	426	53.65%	358	45.09%	10	1.26%
2006	332	51.96%	302	47.26%	5	0.78%

United States Senate election results for Alpine2
Year	Republican		Democratic		Third party(ies)	
Year	No.	%	No.	%	No.	%
2020	538	50.66%	517	48.68%	7	0.66%
2014	247	49.90%	236	47.68%	12	2.42%
2013	160	52.46%	142	46.56%	3	0.98%
2008	438	48.78%	449	50.00%	11	1.22%

== Education ==
The Alpine Public School District is a community school district serving students in kindergarten through eighth grade at Alpine School. As of the 2022–23 school year, the district, comprised of one school, had an enrollment of 170 students and 21.5 classroom teachers (on an FTE basis), for a student–teacher ratio of 7.9:1. In the 2016–17 school year, Alpine had the 33rd smallest enrollment of any school district in the state, with 160 students.

For ninth through twelfth grades, public school students attend Tenafly High School in Tenafly as part of a sending/receiving relationship with the Tenafly Public Schools under which the Alpine district pays tuition for each student. As of the 2022–23 school year, the school had an enrollment of 1,200 students and 103.3 classroom teachers (on an FTE basis), for a student–teacher ratio of 11.6:1.

Public school students from the borough and all of Bergen County are eligible to attend the secondary education programs offered by the Bergen County Technical Schools, which include the Bergen County Academies in Hackensack, and the Bergen Tech campus in Teterboro or Paramus. The district offers programs on a shared-time or full-time basis, with admission based on a selective application process and tuition covered by the student's home school district.

== Transportation ==
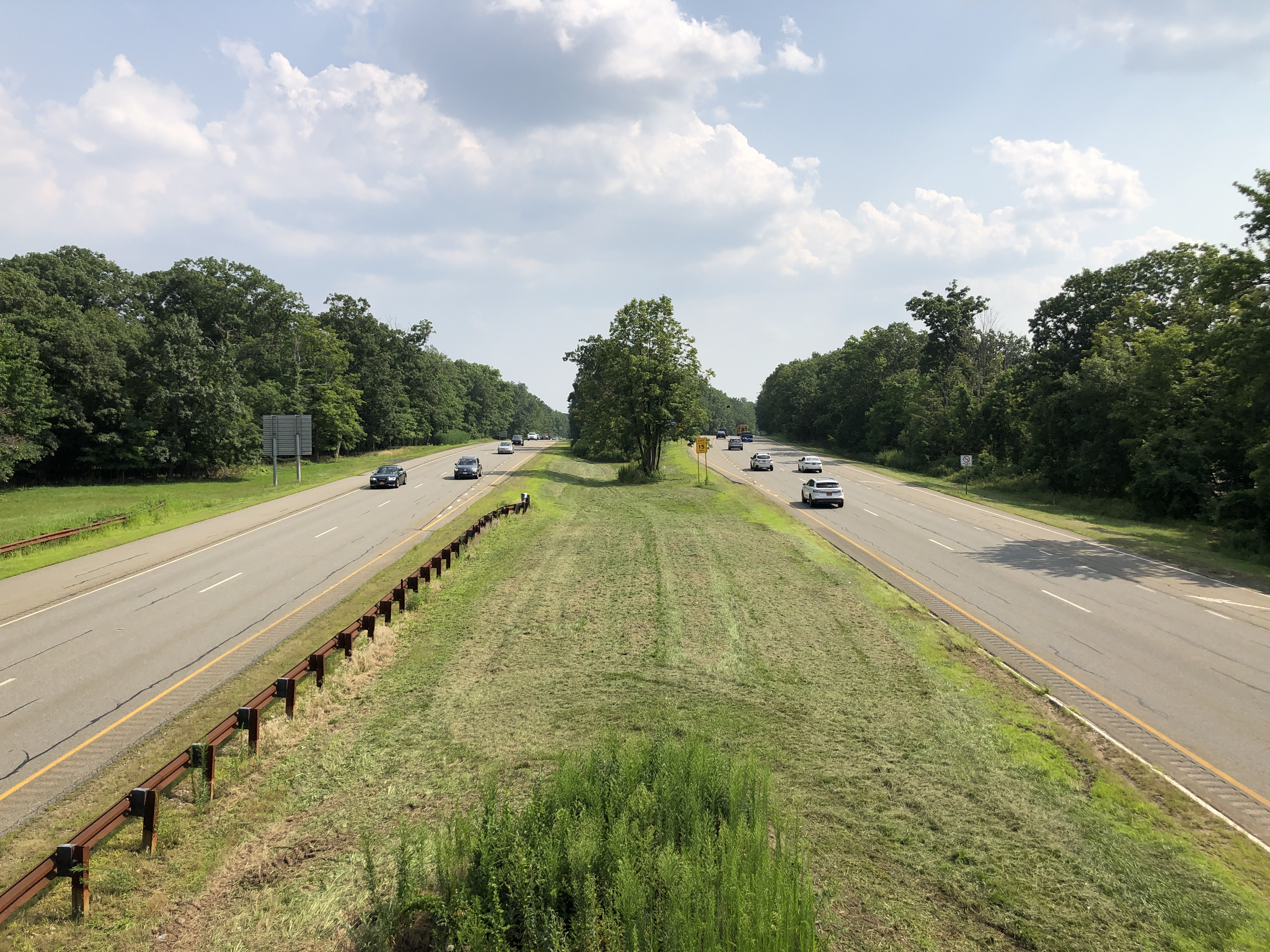
A view south along the Palisades Interstate Parkway in Alpine

=== Roads and highways ===
As of May 2010, the borough had a total of 30.40 miles (48.92 km) of roadways, of which 16.12 miles (25.94 km) were maintained by the municipality, 2.40 miles (3.86 km) by Bergen County and 5.86 miles (9.43 km) by the New Jersey Department of Transportation and 6.02 miles (9.69 km) by the Palisades Interstate Parkway Commission.

U.S. Route 9W, the Palisades Interstate Parkway and County Route 502 all pass through Alpine.

=== Public transportation ===
Rockland Coaches provides service along Route 9W to the Port Authority Bus Terminal in Midtown Manhattan on the 9T / 9AT routes and to the George Washington Bridge Bus Station on the 9 and 9A routes.

NJ Transit provides no bus or train service in Alpine.

NJ Transit bus route 753 provides service in Cresskill, which runs between Cresskill and Paramus at the Bergen Town Center.

== Media ==
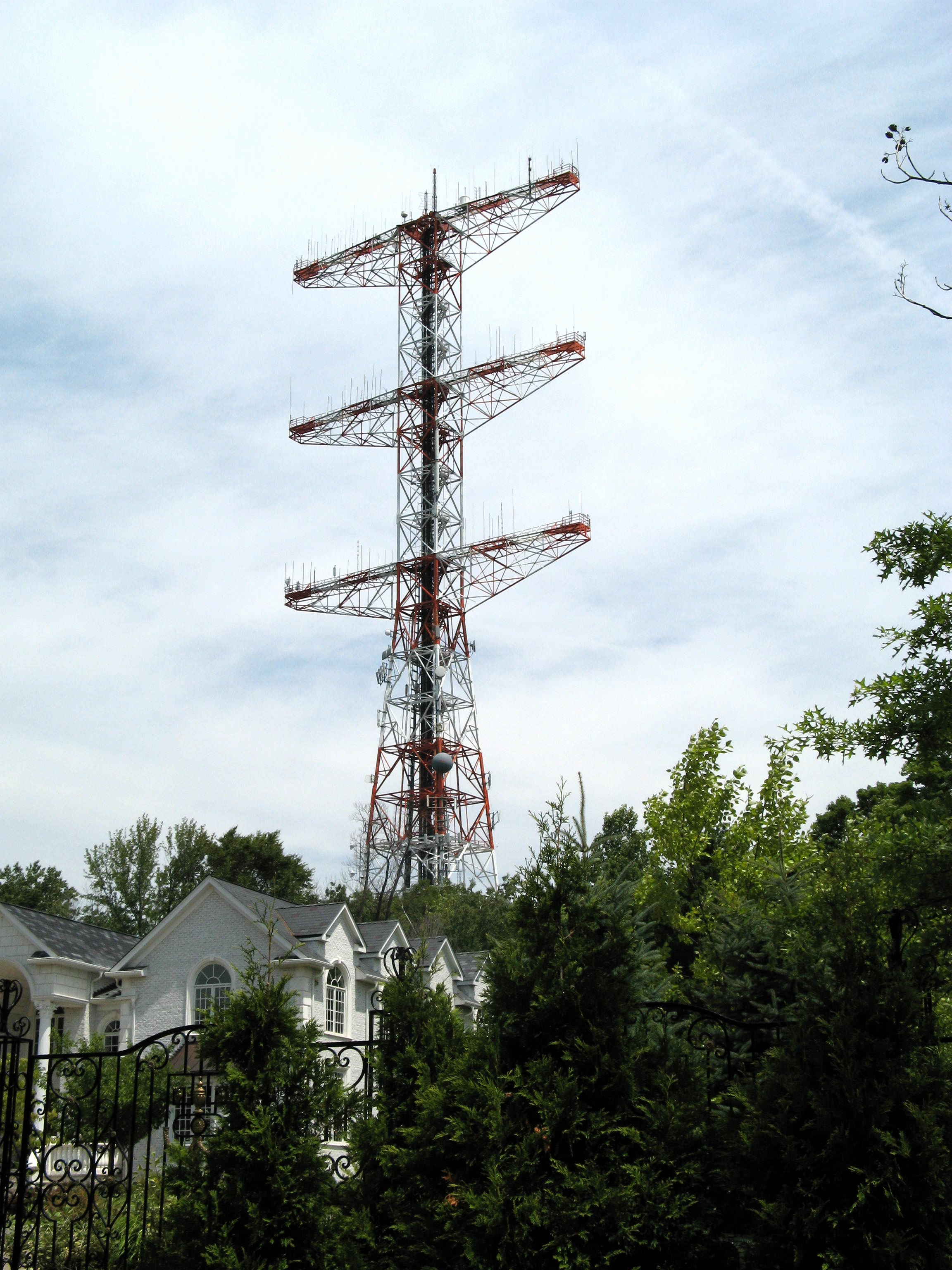
Armstrong Tower, Alpine

Alpine is home to the tower and laboratory built by Edwin Howard Armstrong after RCA evicted him from the Empire State Building. Armstrong's experimental FM station, W2XMN, used various frequencies to broadcast from the tower, first on 42.8 MHz; later on 44.1 MHz; and finally on 93.1 MHz in the modern FM band. The laboratory building and the tower still stand; the 400-foot (122-m) tower is home to many two-way radio users, one modern FM station (Fairleigh Dickinson University's WFDU), and backup transmitters for several of New York's television stations. The tower served as a primary tower for the stations after the September 11 terrorist attacks destroyed the World Trade Center.

There was some local opposition to this scheme, but the move was temporary, as the stations affected moved their primary broadcast facilities to the Empire State Building. The original lab building is home to a static display of historic communications equipment and offices; the USA Network cable channel operated from this building in the late 1970s.

== Points of interest ==
Rio Vista is an upscale neighborhood in the southern section of Alpine. Rio Vista is home to Devil's Tower, a stone water tower that is claimed to be haunted. It was originally designed by Charles Rollinson Lamb for sugar baron Manuel Rionda (1854–1943) in order to allow his wife to see New York from the New Jersey side of the Hudson River. The legend has it that when his wife saw him with another woman, she committed suicide by jumping off the tower.

After becoming upset over his wife's death, Rionda stopped all work on the tower. In reality Harriet Rionda died of natural causes in 1922 and was interred nearby for approximately 20 years. Her coffin was moved to Brookside Cemetery, Englewood. The estate was later sub-divided into 197 housing sites consisting of miles of roadway, infrastructure, and related facilities in the mid-1980s.

The New Jersey Section of the Palisades Interstate Park runs the length of Alpine along the top of the New Jersey Palisades and along the Hudson River. The Alpine Boat Basin serves as both a public picnic area and small marina for private boats. The area is a scenic riverfront picnic area and boat basin, plus beach for car-top boat launches (canoe and kayak), with fishing, access to hiking trails and Henry Hudson Drive, restrooms, water, vending machines, and public phones. Alpine Pavilion, an open-air stone picnic pavilion built in 1934 by the Civil Works Administration and available for rental is located here, as well as the historic Blackledge-Kearney House, a family homestead built in the 1760s, which is also said to be the site where Lord Cornwallis and his troops landed on November 20, 1776, in their pursuit of the Continental Army following the rout of George Washington's forces in the Battle of New York.

== Notable people ==
People who were born in, residents of, or otherwise closely associated with Alpine include:

- Aras Agalarov (born 1955), Russian billionaire
- Gioia Marconi Braga, daughter of Guglielmo Marconi and chairwoman of the Marconi Foundation
- J. Cleaveland Cady (1837–1919), architect
- Sean Combs (born 1969), rap artist
- Kellyanne Conway (born 1967), strategist, and pollster who was campaign manager for Republican presidential candidate Donald Trump in 2016
- Johnny Damon (born 1973), outfielder who played for the New York Yankees from 2006 to 2009
- Damon Dash (born 1971), hip-hop entrepreneur
- Eddie Einhorn (1936–2016), part owner of the Chicago White Sox
- Patrick Ewing (born 1962), former center for the New York Knicks
- Fabolous (born 1977), rap artist
- Henry Clay Frick II (1919–2007), physician and head of the Frick Collection
- Andre Harrell (born 1960), founder of Uptown Records
- Matt Herr (born 1976), ice hockey forward who played for part of four NHL seasons
- O'Kelly Isley Jr. (1937–1986), founding member of The Isley Brothers
- Sachin H. Jain (born 1980), physician and Obama Administration official
- Jay-Z (born 1969), rap artist
- Ilya Kovalchuk (born 1983), former right wing for the NHL New Jersey Devils
- Lil' Kim (born 1974), rap artist, who rapped about her new hometown in her song Aunt Dot ("Come on Shanice, I'm takin' you to my house in Alpine...")
- Harold Lamb (1892–1962), historian, screenwriter, short story writer and novelist
- Eric Maskin (born 1950), co-winner of the 2007 Nobel Memorial Prize in Economic Sciences
- Pierre McGuire (born 1961), ice hockey analyst who was head coach of the Hartford Whalers
- Peter Moraites (1922–2014), Speaker of the New Jersey General Assembly who resigned from office in 1971 after facing charges that he accepted fees from a loan applicant
- Tracy Morgan (born 1968), comedian and actor
- Eddie Murphy (born 1961), comedian, actor who has appeared in the Beverly Hills Cop series and as the voice of Donkey in the Shrek series
- Charles Nordhoff (1830–1901), journalist
- Joe Piscopo (born 1951), actor, best known as a cast member of Saturday Night Live
- John Ringling (1866–1936), best-known of the seven Ringling brothers, five of whom merged the Barnum & Bailey Circus with their own Ringling Brothers Circus to create the Ringling Brothers Barnum and Bailey Circus, he built the Gray Crag estate in Alpine in the 1920s
- Manuel Rionda (1854–1943), Spanish-born, US-based sugar baron in Cuba
- Chris Rock (born 1965), comedian and actor, has described Alpine as "Beverly Hills with freaking snow" Rock has mentioned Alpine in his comedy act, pointing out the efforts and fame required of the black residents, while his next door neighbor, who is white, is "just a dentist".
- Larry Robbins (born 1971), founder of Glenview Capital Management
- Paul Rosenberg (born 1971), CEO of Goliath Records and former CEO of Def Jam Recordings, best known for his association with hip hop artist Eminem
- CC Sabathia (born 1980), pitcher for the New York Yankees
- Norman Sas (1925–2012), inventor of electric football and former member of the Alpine borough council
- Gary Sheffield (born 1968), former baseball player
- Russell Simmons (born 1957), hip-hop entrepreneur
- Wesley Snipes (born 1962), actor
- Britney Spears (born 1981), singer
- Seth Stephens-Davidowitz (born 1982), data scientist, economist and author
- Joseph A. Unanue (1925–2013), president of Goya Foods from 1976 to 2004
- Stevie Wonder (born 1950), musician
- George Zabriskie (1868–1954), flour merchant, food-industry executive, wartime administrator, historical collector and preservationist
- Robert Zoellner (1932–2014), investor and stamp collector who was the second person to have assembled a complete collection of United States postage stamps

== Sources ==
- Municipal Incorporations of the State of New Jersey (according to Counties) prepared by the Division of Local Government, Department of the Treasury (New Jersey); December 1, 1958.
- Clayton, W. Woodford; and Nelson, William. History of Bergen and Passaic Counties, New Jersey, with Biographical Sketches of Many of its Pioneers and Prominent Men. Philadelphia: Everts and Peck, 1882.
- Garbe-Morillo, Patricia. Closter and Alpine, Arcadia Publishing Images of America series, 2001. ISBN 9780738508580.
- Harvey, Cornelius Burnham (ed.), Genealogical History of Hudson and Bergen Counties, New Jersey. New York: New Jersey Genealogical Publishing Co., 1900.
- Van Valen, James M. History of Bergen County, New Jersey. New York: New Jersey Publishing and Engraving Co., 1900.
- Westervelt, Frances A. (Frances Augusta), 1858–1942, History of Bergen County, New Jersey, 1630–1923, Lewis Historical Publishing Company, 1923.
