= W2XMN =

Experimental radio station in Alpine, New Jersey

W2XMN was an experimental FM radio station located in Alpine, New Jersey. It was constructed beginning in 1936 by Edwin Howard Armstrong in order to promote his invention of wide-band FM broadcasting. W2XMN was the first FM station to begin regular operations, and was used to introduce FM broadcasting to the general public in the New York City area. The station, in addition to being a testing site for transmitter and receiver development, was used for propagation studies and as an over-the-air relay station for distributing network programming to other FM stations in the region.

W2XMN primarily operated on what became known as FM's "low band", mostly transmitting on 42.8 MHz until December 1946, and on 44.1 MHz thereafter. The station ceased operating in 1949, after the Federal Communications Commission reassigned the "low band" frequencies (42-50 MHz) to other services. At this point most of W2XMN's functions were inherited by Armstrong's "high band" FM station, KE2XCC, located at the same Alpine site, which had been established in 1945 as W2XEA, and remained in operation until 1954.

== History ==
Armstrong was already a well known radio inventor when he developed "wide-band frequency modulation" (FM) technology in the early 1930s, which he considered to be such a superior approach to radio transmissions that it would soon make existing "amplitude modulation" (AM) broadcasting stations obsolete. He initially sought the support of the largest U.S. radio company at the time, the Radio Corporation of America (RCA), and quietly made some developmental transmissions from that company's testing site at the Empire State Building in New York City. RCA eventually decided that it was not interested in FM, instead concentrating on television development, and asked Armstrong to remove his equipment.

Without RCA's support Armstrong faced a more difficult task in promoting FM, and began to recruit smaller electronics firms as allies. In addition, Armstrong was independently wealthy due to revenue from sales of his earlier patents, and could afford to spend large sums promoting FM himself. Because of the high transmitting frequencies in use, which tended to limit station ranges to "line-of-sight" distances, it was important to have signals broadcast from as high a point as possible. Armstrong arranged for the construction of a distinctive tower with three large cross-arms, located atop the Palisades in Alpine, New Jersey, overlooking the Hudson River a few kilometers north of New York City. On June 12, 1936, he was issued permission to operate an experimental station, with the call sign W2XMN, from the Alpine site. In 1938 this station was assigned to transmit on 42.8 MHz, which would be its primary frequency for the next ten years. (An additional temporary frequency assignment for 117.43 MHz was issued in 1941.)

A 1939 article in Fortune magazine dramatically described the station as "When W2XMN, on 42.8 megacycles (approximately seven meters), opened fire in 1938, it was the last gun to crush even the most obdurate opposition." In 1948 testimony, Armstrong recapped the events as:

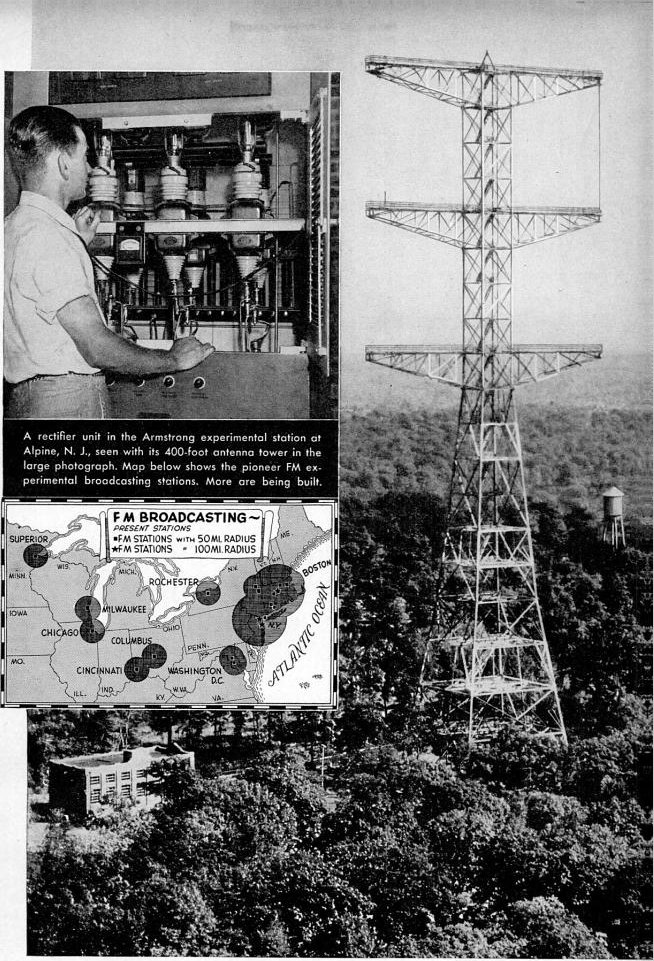
1940 photograph of Armstrong's multi-tiered tower in Alpine, New Jersey. W2XMN's antenna, mounted between the top two tiers, is the vertical line at the far upper right.

Back in the dark ages, when we had static, people said: "There isn't anything you can do about it; that is one of the impossible problems nobody can solve." They said that for 20 years, but eventually it was solved. Today we have staticless broadcasting. But, after it was invented, people said: "Well, that is very nice, but it is too late; the broadcasting system is all built up. You cannot put it into use."

The reason they said that was this: Every other invention that had been made since broadcasting started was either an improvement on the transmitter or on the receiver of the existing system, so that the system did not have to be changed. But FM overcame static by producing a wave which was different from the static waves, so that it was possible to separate out these bedevilling natural electric waves which create static in our AM system from the AM wave. But that meant you had to have new transmitters and new receivers. So, we came to the "chicken and the egg" problem. People said: "You cannot establish FM broadcasting, because the public will not buy receivers until there are FM stations, and the broadcasters will not put up FM stations and spend the money until the public have receivers." And then there was an added variation on that, which was that the manufacturers would not build FM receivers. They did not like to be jarred out of an established rut, and change their techniques until there was a public demand for it.

So, for a time it was a merry ring-around-the-rosy, but it was solved in this way: I built an FM transmitter and started it going at a cost of $300,000. Then I financed one of our largest manufacturing companies to build FM sets. That is the way it started. After that we came to the practical situation of changing over from one system to the other... So, we answered it in this way: We said the way the change-over will be made will be this: "The broadcasters will set up FM stations which will parallel, carry the same program, as over their AM stations." The receivers which will be built will be adapted to receive both AM and FM at the option of the listener. Until such time as an FM station comes into his territory, he will use it as an AM receiver. Then after that, when the FM station comes in, he can get his program on FM by simply turning a switch and using the FM part of it, and get reception without static, and eventually the day will come, of course, when we will no longer have to build receivers capable of receiving both types of transmission, and then the AM transmitters will disappear.

— "Statement of Major Edwin H. Armstrong", (January 15, 1948), "Restrictive union practices of the American Federation of Musicians", United States Congress, House Committee on Education and Labor (1948 hearings), pages 144-145.

Armstrong did his initial development with limited publicity, which led to a local newspaper referring to his highly visible tower as "Bergen County's mysterious 400-foot tower". In January 1939 he made a widely publicized announcement about his work and future plans, including the introduction of regular FM broadcasts in conjunction with John V. L. Hogan's New York City station, WQXR (now WFME), which had been promoting high-fidelity transmissions on the AM band. The first public W2XMN broadcast took place on July 18, 1939, which used a high-quality phone line link to rebroadcast a program from WQXR. W2XMN continued to be used as a test site for developing FM technology as well as for a broadcasting service which gave the public a chance to evaluate the potential of FM transmissions, and in early 1940 the station's broadcasting schedule was reported to be 4:00 to 11:00 p.m. weekdays.

In May 1940, largely as the result of Armstrong's efforts, the Federal Communications Commission (FCC) authorized an FM band effective January 1, 1941, operating on 40 channels spanning 42–50 MHz. W2XMN had been relaying programs from CBS, but because that company was now making plans to establish its own New York City FM station, it was announced that W2XMN programming would be switching to 10 hours daily of playing "electrical transcriptions", which were high-quality phonograph records.

With the entrance of the United States into World War II in late 1941, civilian development of FM largely ceased, as Armstrong worked on developing FM communications for military applications. After the end of the war, on June 27, 1945, the FCC announced that due to interference concerns it was reallocating the current FM "low band" frequencies to other services, with 42–44 MHz going to "non-government fixed and mobile", and 44–50 MHz allocated to television channel 1. (The TV allocation was later reassigned as additional "non-government fixed and mobile" frequencies.) This in turn meant that existing FM band stations would be relocated to 88-106 MHz (later expanded to 108 MHz). Armstrong had strenuously objected to this move when it was still just a proposal, as being unnecessarily disruptive. However, at the time of its adoption he also announced that he had developed the technology needed for stations to simultaneously broadcast on both their original "low band" and new "high band" frequencies to help ease the transition. He also applied for a "high band" station authorization, which was granted on August 6, 1945, as W2XEA, operating on 92.1 MHz. In July 1946 the FCC directed that FM stations currently operating on 42-44 MHz would have to move to new frequencies by the end of the year. Thus, in late December W2XMN's primary assignment was changed from 42.8 to 44.1 MHz, still operating with 40 kW. (An additional temporary frequency assignment for 92.5 MHz was issued in 1947, for "investigating problems of 400 kc separation of FM stations".)

In the late 1940s the fledgling FM radio industry worked to establish high quality programming while containing costs. In 1947 the Continental network was established, centered on station WASH in Washington, D.C., which distributed programming to stations in the northeast United States. Some stations were linked to the network by special telephone lines, which were expensive and only available in limited areas. An alternate, and much less expensive, means of distribution used by Continental involved linking stations directly, by picking up other network station's transmissions. As of June 19, 1947, over-the-air transmissions from W2XMN and W2XEA provided the link to the Continental network for four additional stations.

Armstrong continued to vigorously fight the pending move to the "high band" on the grounds that it was not technically needed, and also because the higher frequencies had less coverage. This was borne out by a series of observations comparing simulcasts of "low band" W2XMN with "high band" W2XEA. In early 1948 a Stromberg-Carlson executive testified that, listening from a location in upstate New York, "It has been my personal experience that the 44- to 50-megacycle band gives more reliable reception for rural and regional FM than the 88- to 108-megacycle band" and "reception from W2XMN, Alpine, N. J., in the low band was almost always satisfactory, while W2XEA, Alpine, N. J., same power, same location, in the high band was frequently subject to serious fading or not receivable at all". In addition, a Massachusetts Institute of Technology study comparing simultaneous reception from August 1947 to December 1948 of W2XMN on 44.1 MHz and W2XEA on 92.1 MHz found that "in general, reception at the higher of these two frequencies has been inferior to that of the lower frequency". (In August 1947, it was reported that W2XEA on 92.1 MHz was currently operating with a power "of approximately 20 kw", while W2XMN was on 44.1 MHz with "approximately 30 kw".)

In May 1948 the FCC stated that any remaining "low band" FM stations would have to cease operations by the end of the year. Attempts were made to try to convince the FCC to allow some of the "low band" frequencies to continue to be made available for network programming retransmissions, but this proved unsuccessful. In December the FCC repeated its order that all remaining "low band" FM stations had to shut down by the end of the month. Armstrong disputed this in the courts and received a temporary stay issued by the District of Columbia Court of Appeals. However, the appeal was ultimately unsuccessful, and W2XMN ended operations in July 1949. Afterward W2XEA, operating on the "high band", took over the role of Armstrong's main station for developmental research and regular broadcasting, under a newly assigned call sign of KE2XCC.

== See also ==
- Armstrong Tower
- WA2XMN
- Apex (radio band)
