= Saturday's Children =

Saturday's Children may refer to:

- Saturday's Children (1929 film), a romantic comedy film by Gregory La Cava
- Saturday's Children (1940 film), a drama film by Vincent Sherman
- Saturday's Children (play), a 1926 play by Maxwell Anderson

== See also ==
- Saturday's Child, a 1966 song by the Monkees
