= Saturday's Children (play) =

1926 play by Maxwell Anderson

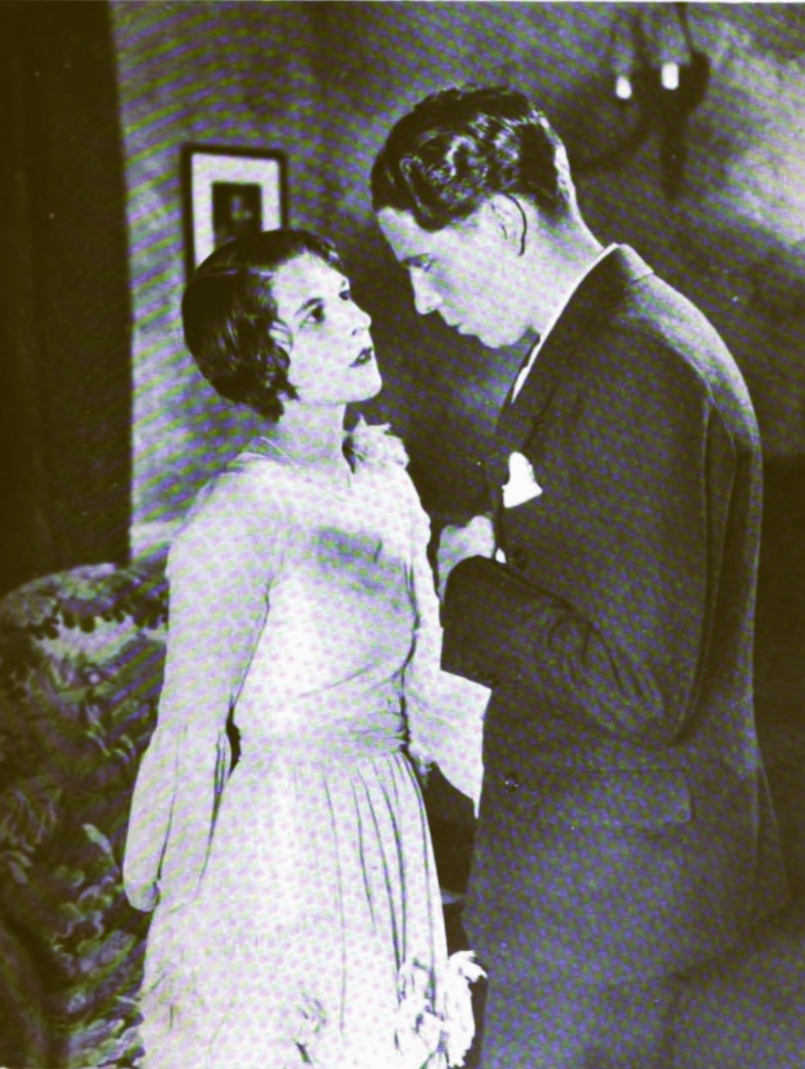
- Ruth Gordon and Roger Pryor
- Original language: English
- Written by: Maxwell Anderson
- Subject: Newlyweds navigate the perils of marriage
- Genre: Comedy
- Setting: The Halevy's dining room, the O'Neil's kitchen, Mrs. Gorlik's boarding house

Premiere
- Date: January 26, 1927
- Place: Booth Theatre
- Directed by: Guthrie McClintic

Saturday's Children is a 1926 play by Maxwell Anderson. It is a three-act comedy with as many settings, and seven characters. The action of the play takes place over six months time in New York City. The story concerns a young woman who follows her older sister's advice on how to trap a young man, but finds marriage difficult on $40 a week. The title comes from a line in an English folk song suggesting Saturday's Children must work hard for a living.

The play was produced by The Actors Theatre, Inc., staged by Guthrie McClintic, with sets designed by Jo Mielziner. It starred Ruth Gordon with Roger Pryor. It had a two-day tryout in Stamford, Connecticut during January 1927, followed immediately by the Manhattan premiere. It ran for nine months on Broadway, ending in October 1927 after 315 performances. Burns Mantle reported Saturday's Children tied with Broadway for best play of the season in an informal poll of drama critics, and he included it in his compilation of The Best Plays of 1926-27.

Saturday's Children was adapted for films of the same name in 1929 and 1940, and for a 1935 movie called Maybe It's Love. It was also televised live during 1962.

== Characters ==
Characters are listed in order of appearance within their scope.

Lead

- Bobby Halevy is single and 23, living with her parents, and working for Mr. Mengle.
- Rims O'Neil is a young bachelor earning $40 a week at Mengle's music firm.

Supporting

- Florrie Sands is Bobby's sharp older sister, a former secretary who married her boss.
- Mr. Halevy is the father of Florrie and Bobby, sixtyish and growing a bit cynical.

Featured

- Willie Sands is Florrie's slightly henpecked husband, a cigar-smoking real estate agent.
- Mrs. Halevy is the mother of Florrie and Bobby, a pleasant and easy-going parent.
- Mrs. Gorlik is the prim widowed landlady for Bobby's boarding house.

Bit player

- The Chauffeur works for Mengle and delivers a package in the third act.

Voice only

- Matty is a female resident of Mrs. Gorlik's rooming house.

Off stage

- Mr. Mengle is the middle-aged wealthy and married employer of both Bobby and Rims.

== Synopsis ==
Act I (The Halevy's apartment dining room. A June evening.) Florrie and Willie Sands are visiting her parents. They discuss Bobby's marriage prospects with Mrs. Halevy, while Mr. Halevy works on a radio set he built. Florrie says Bobby is too inexperienced and needs to be taken in hand if she is ever to marry. Willie and her bicker; it is plain she has the upper hand in their marriage. A phone call from Rims O'Neil marks the start of Florrie's campaign. She tells him that Bobby is going out later, but he can see her in thirty minutes. Bobby arrives late, having dined with Mr. Mengle, who offered her a proposal. "A marriage proposal?" asks Mrs. Halevy. Bobby replies no, just a proposal. It is clear she is not naive, nor helpless with men. Florrie tells Bobby about Rims call, and urges her to put on her pink dress for him. While the others leave for a concert in the park, Florrie quickly writes in shorthand some instructions for Bobby on how to maneuver Rims. Bobby doesn't want to trick Rims, but when he mentions that Mr. Mengle wants to send him to Buenos Aires to open a branch office, she realizes she must act fast. Glancing at the shorthand notes, which Rims cannot read, she puts Florrie's plan into action, and before long Rims proposes marriage. (Curtain)

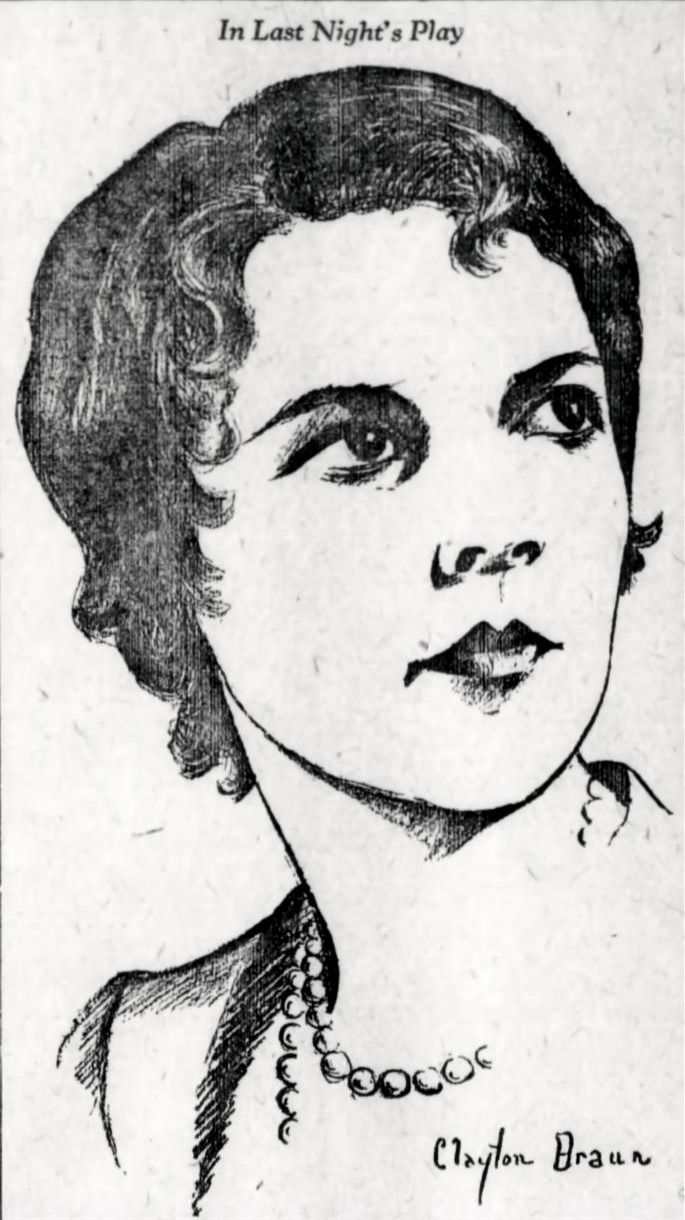
Ruth Gordon as Bobby

Act II (The O'Neil's kitchen-dining room. November.) Married six months now, the O'Neils live in a tiny two room rental house Willie found for them. Bobby quit her job, and Rims' weekly wages are barely enough to support them. Bobby has made out a detailed budget, but Rims resents having to report every expense, particularly his occasional pinochle or poker games. Bobby feels that Rims regrets marrying her, while she hates their arguments and wishes they could go back to being a romantic couple. Florrie and Willie drop by, with the former advising Bobby to have a baby in order to bind Rims more closely. Bobby does not want to trick Rims again, so when her father visits, she asks him what to do. Mr. Halevy suggests it probably wasn't a good idea to get married, but now that you are you should please yourself. Florrie finds a poker IOU that Rims had dropped on the floor, which sets off another argument between Bobby and Rims. Finally, both walk out of the house. (Curtain)

Act III (A bedroom at Mrs. Gorlik's boarding house on East 33rd Street. About 9pm, three weeks later.) Bobby returned to her parent's apartment for a week, before finding a room with Mrs. Gorlik. She only rents to women, and bedroom doors, which have no locks, must be kept open while men visit. Bobby has resumed working for Mr. Mengle, who once again has taken her to dinner. Rims, however, has taken a new job working with hydraulic machinery. Mr. Halevy visits Bobby, but finds her still out. He gets an earful of Mrs. Gorlik's opinions while waiting. Next Rims comes calling; he followed Bobby when she left work and found where she now lives. After Bobby arrives, Mr. Halevy leaves. Bobby explains to Rims that she wants their old pre-marriage relationship back, but doesn't insist on divorce. The Chauffeur for Mr. Mengle brings a package to Bobby, containing a bolt lock for her door as a joke. Rims is incensed and takes the bolt, but is kicked out by Mrs. Gorlik as it now 10pm. Bobby falls sobbing onto her bed in the darkened room, but soon sees Rims coming through the open window into her room from the fire escape, carrying the bolt and a screw driver. They embrace then Rims begins to attach the bolt lock. (Curtain)

== Original production ==
=== Background ===
In November 1926, independent producer Crosby Gaige bought a play from Maxwell Anderson that had the working title of Manhattan Marriages. Later that month, a schism in the board of directors for the Actors' Theatre, Inc. led to the resignations of Kenneth Macgowan, Eugene O'Neill, and Robert Edmond Jones over a planned revival of O'Neill's Beyond the Horizon. The Actors' Theatre, Inc. was an amalgamation of several progressive theater groups in New York City, financed largely by Otto H. Kahn. The remaining board for the Actors' Theatre offered the producing director role to Guthrie McClintic, who accepted in early December 1926.

Meanwhile, Crosby Gaige was reportedly casting for what was now called Saturday's Children, but a few days later was preparing to sail for London, where he would produce Broadway. A newspaper reported the rumor that the Actors' Theatre under McClintic would have as its first production Saturday's Children, though the "exact circumstances of the rumored change of hands are yet unrecorded". This was confirmed when rehearsals of Saturday's Children by the Actors' Theatre under McClintic's direction were reported on January 4, 1927, with Ruth Gordon as the lead. Set design would be by Jo Mielziner, with Roger Pryor supporting Ruth Gordon as male lead.

=== Cast ===
Cast from the Stamford tryout through the Broadway run.
| Role | Actor | Dates | Notes and sources |
|---|---|---|---|
| Bobby | Ruth Gordon | Jan 26, 1927 - Oct 22, 1927 | Emily Hammond took this role from July 9-12, 1927 when Gordon's husband Gregory Kelly died. |
| Florrie Sands | Ruth Hammond | Jan 26, 1927 - Oct 22, 1927 | |
| Rims O'Neil | Roger Pryor | Jan 26, 1927 - Jul 30, 1927 | Pryor left to begin rehearsals for a new musical, Strike Up the Band. |
| Rims O'Neil | Humphrey Bogart | Aug 01, 1927 - Oct 22, 1927 | |
| Willie Sands | Richard Barbee | Jan 26, 1927 - Oct 22, 1927 | |
| Mrs. Halevy | Lucia Moore | Jan 26, 1927 - Sep 10, 1927 | Moore "withdrew" from the cast after 33 weeks playing this role. |
| Mrs. Halevy | Grace Roth Henderson | Sep 12, 1927 - Oct 22, 1927 | |
| Mr. Halevy | Frederick Perry | Jan 26, 1927 - Oct 22, 1927 | |
| Mrs. Gorlik | Beulah Bondi | Jan 26, 1927 - Aug 27, 1927 | For two weeks Bondi played in Act I of Mariners while still performing in Act III of Saturday. (Note: A situation made possible by the two venues involved being adjacent on West 45th Street, and both productions under control of the Actors' Theatre, Inc.) |
| Mrs. Gorlik | Ann Tonetti | Aug 29, 1927 - Oct 22, 1927 | Tonetti was described as a "society girl". |

=== Tryout ===
Saturday's Children had a two-day tryout at the Stamford Theatre in Stamford, Connecticut, starting January 24, 1927. The reviewer for the Stamford Advocate said it was "an extremely pleasant little comedy", with Maxwell Anderson demonstrating his mastery of domestic conflicts as well as war, referencing his recent What Price Glory?. The critic praised the performances of Ruth Gordon, Ruth Hammond, Roger Pryor, Frederick Perry, and Beulah Bondi, but complained the entire cast was prone to mumbling at the first performance.

=== Broadway premiere and reception ===
“Miss Gordon is really a Wednesday child of woe, I suspect. She is as graven and stolid as an ingenue can be and live. But she is a fascinating somebody, too, and amazingly skillful in playing...”
– Burns Mantle on Saturday's Children

The play had its Broadway premiere at the Booth Theatre on January 26, 1927. The reviewer from the Brooklyn Citizen echoed the complaint about mumbling from the cast, and said the play "moves along quietly and really lacks a punch". Arthur Pollock said "Mr. McClintic does not mind frustrating his audience by refusing to permit his actors to be heard" but was positive about Maxwell Anderson's skill as dramatist and remarked on Ruth Gordon's improved acting. Rowland Field called the production "deft", attributing much to Guthrie McClintic's direction and Jo Mielziner's sets.

Brooks Atkinson, passing quickly over the "irritatingly mild speaking" of the first night performance, observed that "The performance might well be much more robust. One suspects Mr. Anderson of being more a man of letters than a man of the theatre". Atkinson was impressed with the characters of Bobby, Mr. Halevy, and Florrie, the latter of whom he likened to the malevolent spouse of Craig's Wife, and lauded the performances of those characters by Ruth Gordon, Frederick Perry, and Ruth Hammond. Alexander Woollcott, writing a week after the premiere, called Saturday's Children a "wise, crisp absorbing comedy, exquisitely played", and noted its popularity was giving the Actors' Theatre "the new and intoxicating experience of turning people away".

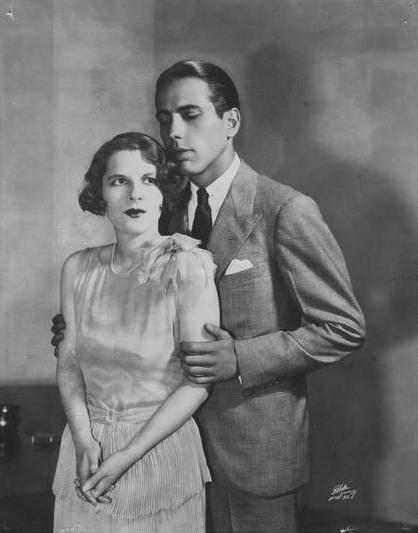
Ruth Gordon & Humphrey Bogart

During late June 1927, drama critic Burns Mantle took an informal poll of eleven colleagues at other publications, nine of whom responded with their choices for the ten best plays of the season. Saturday's Children and Broadway were the only plays listed on all nine returned ballots. (Note: Those who voted included Alexander Woollcott, Brooks Atkinson, George Jean Nathan, Robert Benchley, Percy Hammond, Gilbert Gabriel, John Anderson, Frank Vreeland, and E. W. Osborne.) When the annual volume of The Best Plays series was published in July 1927, editor Burns Mantle included Saturday's Children among the ten best works of the season.

A significant cast change occurred at the end of July 1927, when male lead Roger Pryor departed to begin rehearsals for a new musical, Strike Up the Band. He was replaced in the role of Rims O'Neil by Humphrey Bogart. Bogart would stay with the production after its original Broadway run ended, touring opposite Ruth Gordon through Spring 1928, including for a Broadway return engagement.

=== Broadway closing ===
Saturday's Children closed at the Booth Theatre on October 22, 1927, after 315 performances. (Note: Three Hundred thirteen as listed in the New York Daily News feature "The Golden Dozen", plus the matinee and evening show from the last day.)

== Adaptations ==
=== Film ===
- Saturday's Children (1929) - A Vitaphone film, adapted by Forrest Halsey, starring Corinne Griffith and Grant Withers.
- Maybe It's Love (1935) - Stars Gloria Stuart and Ross Alexander.
- Saturday's Children (1940) - Warner Brothers film, adapted by Julius J. Epstein and Philip G. Epstein, and directed by Vincent Sherman. It starred John Garfield and Anne Shirley, with Claude Rains and Lee Patrick.

=== Television ===
- Saturday's Children (1962) - An hourlong live performance, starring Inger Stevens, Cliff Robertson, and Ralph Bellamy. It was broadcast on CBS from New York, adapted by Ralph Emmett, directed by Tom Donivan, produced by Marshall Jamison, with Leland Hayward as executive producer.

== Bibliography ==
- Maxwell Andersson. Saturday's Children: A Comedy in Three Acts. Longmans, Green and Company, 1927.
- Burns Mantle (ed). The Best Plays of 1926-27 And The Year Book Of The Drama In America. Dodd, Mead & Company, 1927.
