= Philosophy Hall =

Building at Columbia University in Manhattan, New York

- U.S. National Register of Historic Places
- U.S. National Historic Landmark
- New York State Register of Historic Places
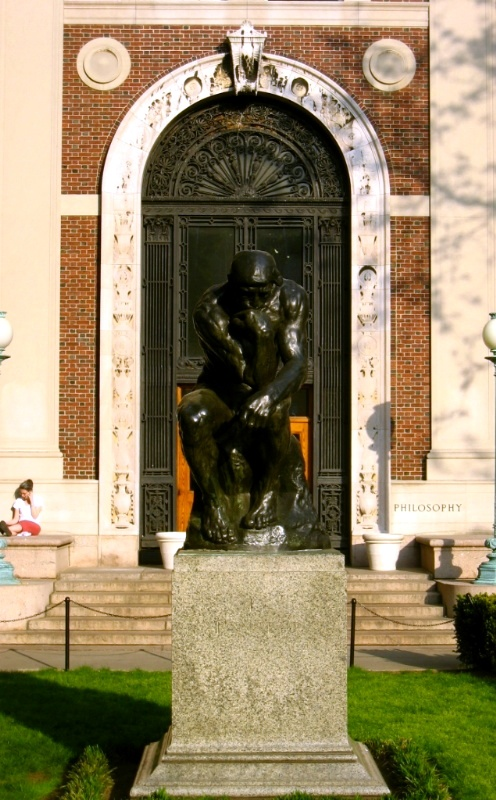
- Rodin's The Thinker with Philosophy Hall in the background

- Location within Manhattan
- Location: 1150 Amsterdam Avenue, Columbia University
- Nearest city: New York City
- Coordinates: 40°48′22″N 73°57′45″W
- Built: 1910
- Architect: McKim, Mead and White
- Architectural style: Italian Renaissance Revival
- NRHP reference No.: 03001046
- NYSRHP No.: 06101.000455

Significant dates
- Added to NRHP: July 31, 2003
- Designated NHL: July 31, 2003
- Designated NYSRHP: July 31, 2003

Philosophy Hall is a building on the campus of Columbia University in New York City. It houses the English, Philosophy, and French departments, along with the university's writing center, part of its registrar's office, and the student lounge of its Graduate School of Arts and Sciences. It is one of the original buildings designed for the university's Morningside Heights campus by McKim, Mead, and White, built in the Italian Renaissance Revival style and completed in 1910. Philosophy Hall is listed on the National Register of Historic Places and has been designated a National Historic Landmark as the site of the invention of FM radio by Edwin Armstrong in the early 1930s.

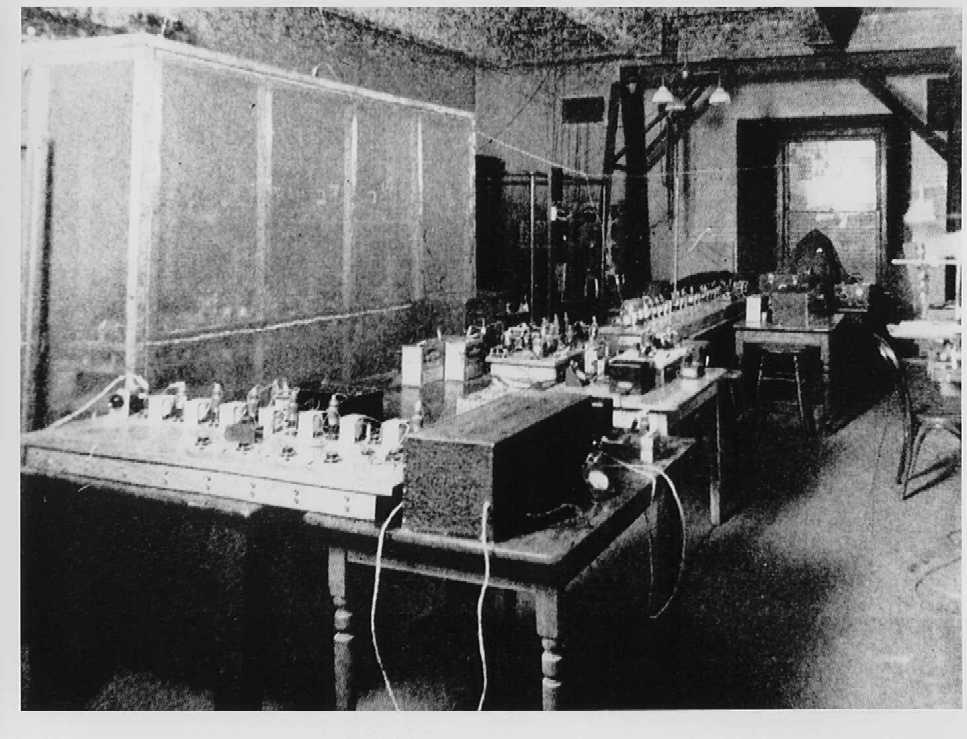
Edwin Armstrong's laboratory in 102 Philosophy, 1930s

The space now occupied by the registrar formerly housed electrical engineering laboratories in which Michael I. Pupin and Edwin Howard Armstrong made several major technological breakthroughs. The building has been home to such notable faculty members as philosophers John Dewey, Frederick J. E. Woodbridge, Ernest Nagel, and Achille Varzi (philosopher) Guadeloupean novelist Maryse Condé, French literary scholar Michael Riffaterre, poet Kenneth Koch and English literary scholars Lionel Trilling, Edward Said, Carolyn Heilbrun, Quentin Anderson, Gayatri Chakravorty Spivak and Mark Van Doren.

Philosophy Hall was not occupied by protesters during the 1968 protests. It served instead as a refuge for faculty and a site of contentious debates among them concerning student conduct.

The lawn in front of Philosophy Hall is the site of an original cast of The Thinker (Le Penseur), one of the most famous pieces by French sculptor Auguste Rodin.

The hall was designated a National Historic Landmark in 2003.

It is one of only a handful of buildings on the Columbia campus named for an academic discipline, and not an individual. The others include Journalism, Mathematics and International Affairs.
