= Mary of Scotland (play) =

1933 Broadway three-act play by American playwright Maxwell Anderson

- Original language: English
- Written by: Maxwell Anderson
- Genre: Drama
- Setting: a pier at Leith, Queen Elizabeth's Whitehall study, a hall in Mary Stuart's Holyrood House apartment, Dunbar Castle, Carlisle Castle

Premiere
- Date: November 27, 1933
- Place: Alvin Theatre; New York City, New York

Mary of Scotland was a 1933 Broadway three-act play written in blank verse by Maxwell Anderson, produced by the Theatre Guild, directed by Theresa Helburn and with scenic and costume design by Robert Edmond Jones. It ran for 248 performances from November 27, 1933 to July 1934 at the Alvin Theatre. Anderson's son Quentin Anderson played a warder. It was included in Burns Mantle's The Best Plays of 1933-1934.

It was adapted into a 1936 film Mary of Scotland mostly directed by John Ford and starring Fredric March and Katharine Hepburn.

A rehearsal for the play provided the setting for a 1976 sketch of "Mama's Family" on The Carol Burnett Show that featured Carol Burnett, Harvey Korman, Vicki Lawrence, and Madeline Kahn.

== Cast ==
- Helen Hayes as Mary Stuart
- Helen Menken as Elizabeth Tudor
- Philip Merivale as James Hepburn, 4th Earl of Bothwell
- Edgar Barrier as Lord Douglas
- Ernest Cossart as Lord Throgmorton
- George Coulouris as Lord Burghley and as Lord Erskine
- Moroni Olsen as John Knox
- Stanley Ridges as Lord Morton
- Charles Dalton as Lord Huntley
- Philip Foster as Lord Gordon
- Wilton Graff as James Stuart Earl of Moray
- Cecil Holm as Jamie a guard
- William Jackson as Monk a guard
- Anthony Kemble Cooper as Lord Darnley
- Ernest Lawford as Maitland of Lethington
- Philip Leigh as David Rizzio
- Quentin Anderson as a warder
- Maurice F. Manson as a page and as Graeme a sergeant
- Jock McGraw as Tammas
- Mary Michael as Mary Beaton
- Cynthia Rogers as Mary Fleming
- Helen Shea as Mary Seton
- Deane Willoughby as Mary Livingston
- Edward Trevor as Chatelard
- Leonard Willey as Duc de Chatelherault and as Lord Ruthven
