= Maxwell L. Anderson =

American art museum director (born 1956)

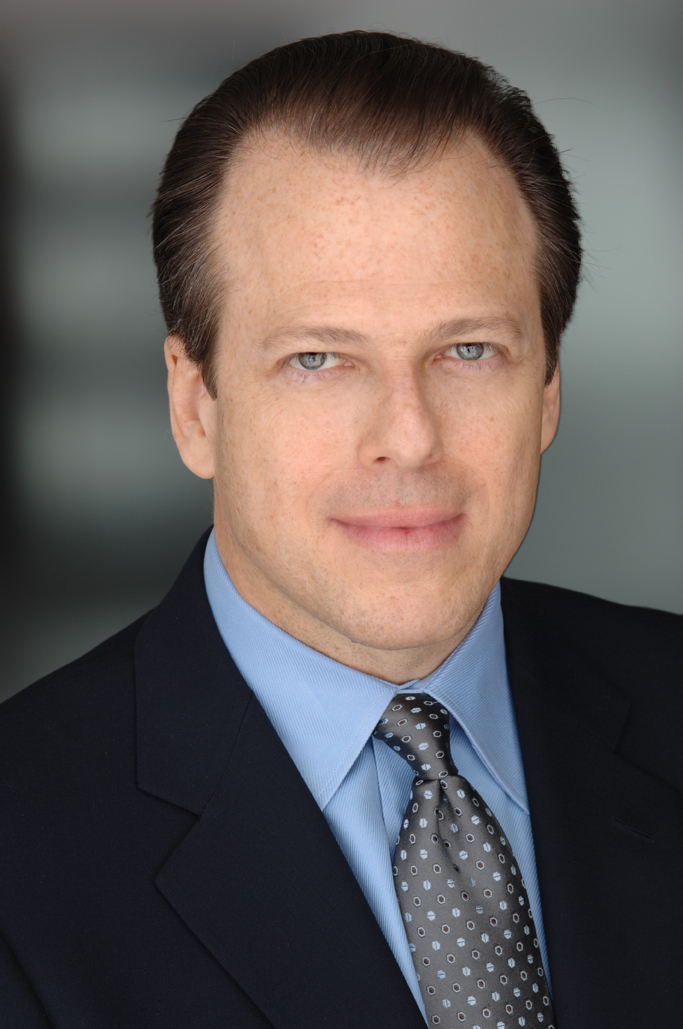
- Born: May 1, 1956 (age 70); New York City, U.S.
- Education: Dartmouth College (B.A., 1977); Harvard University (M.A., 1978; Ph.D., 1981)
- Occupations: President of Souls Grown Deep Foundation, art historian, author, non-profit executive
- Spouse: Jacqueline Buckingham (m. 1995–2016)
- Children: 2
- Father: Quentin Anderson
- Relatives: Maxwell Anderson (grandfather)

Maxwell L. Anderson (born May 1, 1956) is an American art historian, former museum administrator, and non-profit executive, who currently serves as President of the Souls Grown Deep Foundation. Anderson previously served as Alice Pratt Brown Director of the Whitney Museum of American Art from 1998 to 2003, director of the Indianapolis Museum of Art from 2006 to 2011, and director of Dallas Museum of Art from 2011 to 2015.

== Early life and education ==
The son of Columbia University's Julian Clarence Levi Professor Quentin Anderson and grandson of the Pulitzer Prize-winning playwright Maxwell Anderson, he was born in 1956 in New York City and raised there, attending Collegiate School (New York) and graduating from The Dalton School. He received a B.A. from Dartmouth College in Hanover, New Hampshire in 1977 with highest distinction in Art History, and M.A. (1978) and Ph.D. (1981) degrees in the history of Art from Harvard University.

== Career ==
=== Museums ===
Anderson worked as a curatorial assistant at The Metropolitan Museum of Art and subsequently as assistant curator from 1981 to 1987, and became director of the Michael C. Carlos Museum in Atlanta, Georgia (1987–1995).

While in Atlanta he inaugurated a series of loan projects highlighting unpublished treasures from the storerooms of some of the world's leading museums in London, Paris, Rome, Mexico City, and elsewhere, looking for alternatives to buying antiquities from the illicit trade, expanded the Museum with architect Michael Graves, and greatly enlarged the permanent collection.

Anderson served as the director of Toronto's Art Gallery of Ontario from 1995 to 1998, where he led the creation of a national exhibition indemnity program, restituted five 17th-century Italian drawings to the Berlin State Museums, which had been looted during the Second World War, initiated the illustrated web-based publication of the museum's collections, made significant acquisitions of European and Canadian art, and organized numerous exhibitions including The Courtauld Collection, one of the Gallery's five best-attended exhibitions in its history.

Anderson served as the Alice Pratt Brown Director of the Whitney Museum of American Art in New York City from 1998 to 2003. While at the Whitney, he initiated the first multinational art purchase, a work by Bill Viola today jointly owned by the Whitney Museum, the Pompidou, and the Tate, to cope with the large scale of many contemporary artworks in variable media, and created a seat for an artist on the Board of Trustees, with Chuck Close as its first incumbent. He established the Museum's first conservation program, introduced new media and architecture as collecting and programming areas, established an M.A. program in curatorial studies with Columbia University, and grew attendance to some 670,000 annually. In 2003, Anderson resigned from the Whitney over disagreements with Board leadership about the Museum's artistic direction, became a Leadership Fellow at the Yale School of Management's Chief Executive Leadership Program, and subsequently joined a firm advising cultural institutions on planning and programming.

In 2006, Anderson served as the museum director and CEO of the Indianapolis Museum of Art in Indianapolis, Indiana from 2006 to 2011. At the IMA, the museum added over $30 million to its endowment through gifts and pledges, opened a 100-acre sculpture park as well as a conservation science laboratory, acquired the mid-century modern Miller House and Garden estate, and more than doubled museum attendance to reach some 450,000 visitors annually.

Anderson left Indianapolis at the end of 2011 to become the Eugene McDermott Director of the Dallas Museum of Art in Dallas, Texas where he served until 2015. His tenure at the Dallas Museum of Art included introducing free general admission, a novel loyalty program attracting over 100,000 members, a fifteen-year loan of a significant collection of Islamic art and a program in painting conservation.

He served as a board member of the NewCities Foundation beginning in 2011, and stepped into the role of Executive Director in 2015. He relinquished his position in 2017 and rejoined the Foundation's Board of Trustees.

In 2016 Anderson was appointed president of the Souls Grown Deep Foundation, an Atlanta-based collection of African American art from the Southeast. Souls Grown Deep Foundation is the only non-profit organization dedicated to documenting, preserving, exhibiting and promoting the work of contemporary African American artists from the American South. A vital resource for this genre, the Foundation's holdings are extensive, with some 1,200 works by more than 160 artists—among them Thornton Dial, Lonnie Holley, Joe Minter, Purvis Young, Ronald Lockett, Mary T. Smith, Joe Light, and the quilt makers of Gee's Bend. Ranging from large-scale assemblages to works on paper, the Foundation is particularly strong in works dating from the death of Martin Luther King to the end of the twentieth century. Anderson introduced a multi-year program to transfer the majority of the Foundation's works in its care to the permanent collections of leading American and international art museums, which has led to acquisitions by multiple institutions, including the Fine Arts Museums of San Francisco, the High Museum of Art, the Ackland Art Museum, and the New Orleans Museum of Art.

He has lectured and published on general issues of museum practice, especially on the ethical collection of antiquities, institutional transparency, free expression, artists' rights, and the use of new technologies. Anderson is a former president of the Association of Art Museum Directors, a board member of the National Committee for the History of Art, the National Center for Arts Research, and a trustee of the American Federation of Arts. In 1990, he was decorated with the rank of Commendatore (Knight Commander) in the Order of Merit of the Italian Republic and in 2010, he was awarded the French Republic's rank of Chevalier dans l'Ordre des Arts et des Lettres (Knight in the Order of Arts and Letters).

=== Antiquities ===
Anderson has long worked in the field of antiquities, serving as an assistant curator in the Department of Greek and Roman Art at The Metropolitan Museum of Art from 1982 to 1987, and holding teaching positions in the field of Roman art history at the University of Rome II, Princeton University, and Emory University. At the Michael C. Carlos Museum he negotiated several long-term loans of previously unpublished archaeological material to underscore the value of provenance.

In 2007, while director of the Indianapolis Museum of Art, he recognized 1970 as a "bright line" when acquiring ancient art. He advocated changes in the acquisitions policies of the Association of Art Museum Directors as founding chair of its Task Force on Archaeological Materials & Ancient Art beginning in 2003, culminating in its 2008 adoption of a bright line of 1970 as well.

In December 2016 Oxford University Press published his book "Antiquities: What Everyone Needs to Know"

=== New media ===
Anderson was one of the earliest proponents of using new media technologies to advance public interest in art. As Liaison for Information Technology of the AAMD and a Member of the Advisory Council of the Getty Art History Information Program (AHIP) he helped found the Art Museum Image Consortium (AMICO) in 1997 and the Art Museum Network in 1999. In 2008, he modeled museum transparency with the award-winning IMA Dashboard and in 2009, he launched ArtBabble, a site for art museums worldwide to share video content.

== Personal life ==
Anderson married Jacqueline Buckingham Anderson in 1995. They were briefly divorced in 2013, before announcing their remarriage three months later. They are now no longer married. They have two children.
