= Beulah Bondi =

American actress (1888–1981)

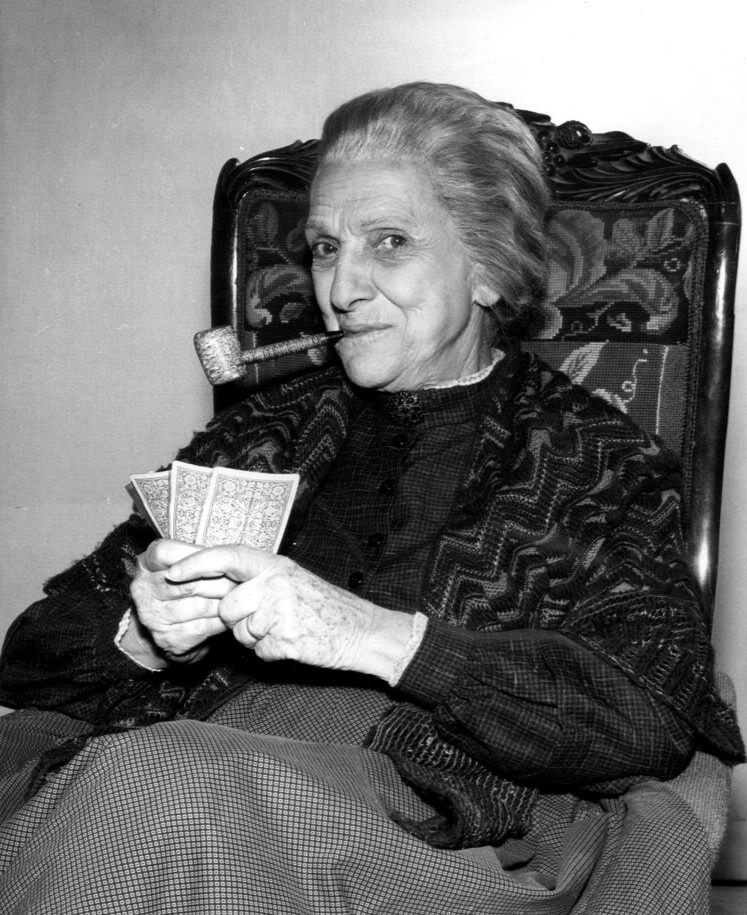
- Bondi in 1961
- Born: Beulah Bondy; May 3, 1888; Chicago, Illinois, U.S.
- Died: January 11, 1981 (aged 92); Los Angeles, California, U.S.
- Education: Valparaiso University
- Occupation: Actress
- Years active: 1895–1976

Beulah Bondi (/bɒndaɪ/) (born Beulah Bondy; May 3, 1888 – January 11, 1981) was an American character actress; she often played eccentric mothers and later grandmothers and wives, although she was known for numerous other roles. She began her acting career as a young child in theater in the late 19th Century, and after establishing herself as a Broadway stage actress in 1925, she reprised her role in Street Scene for the 1931 film version.

She played supporting roles in several films during the 1930s, and was twice nominated for an Academy Award for Best Supporting Actress. She played the mother of James Stewart in four films: Of Human Hearts, Vivacious Lady, Mr. Smith Goes to Washington (1939), and It's a Wonderful Life (1946). Although at her height in Hollywood from the 1930s until the 1950s, Bondi never retired, and she continued acting well into her later years, at the age of 87 winning an Emmy Award for her guest-star role on The Waltons in 1976.

== Early life and education ==
Bondi was born in Chicago, Illinois, the daughter of Eva Suzanna (née Marble), an author, and Abraham O. Bondy, who worked in real estate. The family moved to Valparaiso, Indiana, when she was three, and Bondi began her acting career on the stage at age seven, playing Cedric Errol in a production of Little Lord Fauntleroy at the Memorial Opera House in Valparaiso. She graduated from the Frances Shimer Academy (later Shimer College) in 1907, and gained her bachelor's and master's degrees in oratory at Valparaiso University in 1916 and 1918.

== Career ==
She changed her surname to Bondi and made her Broadway debut in Kenneth Seymour Webb's One of the Family at the 49th Street Theatre on December 21, 1925. She next appeared in another hit, Maxwell Anderson's Saturday's Children in 1927. Her performance in Elmer Rice's Pulitzer Prize-winning Street Scene, which opened at the Playhouse Theatre on January 10, 1929, brought Bondi to the movies at the age of 43. Her debut movie role was as Emma Jones in Street Scene (1931), which starred Sylvia Sidney, and in which Bondi reprised her stage role, followed by "Mrs. Davidson" in Rain (1932), which starred Joan Crawford and Walter Huston. Along with her roles on Broadway, in 1925 and 1926, Bondi was a Summer Stock cast member at the oldest summer stock theater in the country, Elitch Theatre.

She was one of the first five women to be nominated for an Academy Award in the newly created category of "Best Supporting Actress" for her work in The Gorgeous Hussy, although she lost the award to Gale Sondergaard. Two years later she was nominated again for Of Human Hearts and lost again, but her reputation as a character actress kept her employed. For the rest of her career, she would most often be seen in a supporting role as the mother of the star of the film. One exception is the ensemble film Make Way for Tomorrow (1937), where she was one of the leads, playing the abandoned Depression-era 'Ma' Cooper. She often played mature roles in her early film career even though she was only in her early 40s. In 1940 Bondi played Mrs. Webb in Our Town and Granny Tucker in The Southerner, directed by Jean Renoir and released in 1945.

She was tested for the role of Ma Joad in the film of The Grapes of Wrath. Bondi, believing that she had the part, reportedly bought an old jalopy and moved to Bakersfield, California to live among the migrant workers in order to research the role. Bondi was reportedly extremely disappointed at losing the role to Jane Darwell, who won the Academy Award for Best Supporting Actress for her work.

For her contributions to the film industry, Bondi received a motion-picture star on the Hollywood Walk of Fame in 1960, located at 1718 Vine Street.

Although Bondi played mothers and grandmothers on screen, she was a lifelong bachelorette with no children. She admitted, "I never regretted the choice of a career over marriage, it was a difficult decision and I've never been sorry."

=== Television ===
Bondi's television credits include Alfred Hitchcock Presents and Howard Richardson's Ark of Safety on the Goodyear Television Playhouse. She appeared with Jan Clayton in "The Prairie Story" on NBC's Wagon Train. She made a guest appearance on Perry Mason in 1963 when she played the role of Sophia Stone in "The Case of the Nebulous Nephew".

Bondi made her final appearances as Martha Corinne Walton on The Waltons in the episodes "The Conflict" (September 1974) and "The Pony Cart" (December 1976). She received an Emmy for Outstanding Lead Actress for a Single Appearance in a Drama or Comedy Series for her performance in "The Pony Cart". When her name was called, it first appeared that she was not present, but she received a standing ovation as she walked slowly to the podium, from which she thanked the audience for honoring her while she was still living.

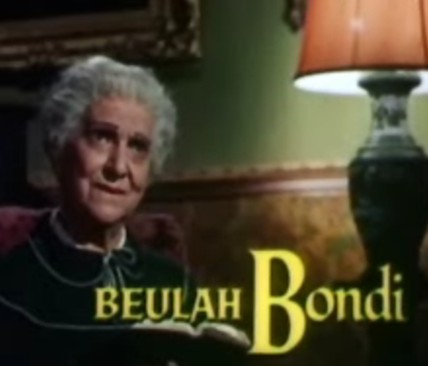
Beulah Bondi in The Unholy Wife (1957)

== Death ==
Bondi died from pulmonary complications caused by broken ribs suffered when she tripped over her cat in her home on January 11, 1981, at age 92. Her remains were cremated and her ashes scattered at sea.

== Filmography ==
Year	Title	Role	Notes
1931	Street Scene	Emma Jones	
1931	Arrowsmith	Mrs. Tozer	Uncredited
1932	Rain	Mrs. Davidson	
1933	The Stranger's Return	Beatrice Storr	
1933	Christopher Bean	Mrs. Hannah Haggett	
1934	Two Alone	Mrs. Slag	
1934	Registered Nurse	Miss McKenna	
1934	Finishing School	Her Teacher / Miss Van Alstyne	
1934	The Painted Veil	Frau Koerber	Scenes cut
1934	Ready for Love	Mrs. Burke	
1935	The Good Fairy	Dr. Schultz	
1935	Bad Boy	Mrs. Larkin	
1936	The Invisible Ray	Lady Arabella Stevens	
1936	The Trail of the Lonesome Pine	Melissa Tolliver	
1936	The Moon's Our Home	Mrs. Boyce Medford	
1936	The Case Against Mrs. Ames	Mrs. Livingston Ames	
1936	Hearts Divided	Madame Letizia	
1936	The Gorgeous Hussy	Rachel Jackson	
1937	Maid of Salem	Abigail – His Wife	
1937	Make Way for Tomorrow	Lucy Cooper	
1938	The Buccaneer	Aunt Charlotte	
1938	Of Human Hearts	Mary Wilkins	
1938	Vivacious Lady	Martha Morgan	
1938	The Sisters	Rose Elliott	
1939	On Borrowed Time	Nellie – Granny	
1939	The Under-Pup	Miss Thornton	
1939	Mr. Smith Goes to Washington	Ma Smith	
1940	Remember the Night	Mrs. Sargent	
1940	Our Town	Mrs. Webb	
1940	The Captain Is a Lady	Angie Peabody	
1941	Penny Serenade	Miss Oliver	
1941	The Shepherd of the Hills	Aunt Mollie Matthews	
1941	One Foot in Heaven	Mrs. Lydia Sandow	
1943	Tonight We Raid Calais	Mme. Bonnard	
1943	Watch on the Rhine	Anise	
1944	She's a Soldier Too	Agatha Kittredge	
1944	I Love a Soldier	Etta Lane	
1944	Our Hearts Were Young and Gay	Miss Horn	
1944	The Very Thought of You	Mrs. Harriet Wheeler	
1944	And Now Tomorrow	Aunt Em	
1945	Back to Bataan	Bertha Barnes	
1945	The Southerner	Granny Tucker	
1946	Breakfast in Hollywood	Mrs. Annie Reed	
1946	Sister Kenny	Mary Kenny	
1946	It's a Wonderful Life	Ma Bailey	
1947	High Conquest	Clara Kingsley	
1948	The Sainted Sisters	Hester Rivercomb	
1948	The Snake Pit	Mrs. Greer	
1948	So Dear to My Heart	Granny Kincaid	
1949	The Life of Riley	Miss Martha Bogle	
1949	Reign of Terror	Grandma Blanchard	
1949	Mr. Soft Touch	Mrs. Clara Hangale	
1950	The Baron of Arizona	Loma	
1950	The Furies	Mrs. Anaheim	
1952	Lone Star	Minniver Bryan	
1953	Latin Lovers	Analyst	
1954	Track of the Cat	Ma Bridges	
1955	Alfred Hitchcock Presents	Mrs. Sutton	Season 1 Episode 8: "Our Cook's a Treasure"
1956	Back from Eternity	Martha Spangler	
1957	The Unholy Wife	Emma Hochen	
1957	On Borrowed Time	'Granny' Northrup	TV movie
1959	The Big Fisherman	Hannah	
1959	A Summer Place	Mrs. Emily Hamilton Hamble	
1960	Harrigan and Son	Tilly Cortland	S1.E11 - "Non Compos Mentis"
1960	Playhouse 90	Mrs. Hulie	S4.E12 - "Tomorrow"
1961	Tammy Tell Me True	Mrs. Annie Call	
1961	Route 66	Agnes Brack	S2.E13 - "Burning for Burning"
1961	Wagon Train	Grandma Bates	S4.E19 - "The Prairie Story"
1962	The Wonderful World of the Brothers Grimm	The Gypsy	('The Dancing Princess')
1962	Alcoa Premiere	Mrs. Murrow	S2.E9 - "The Hands of Danofrio"
1963	Tammy and the Doctor	Mrs. Annie Call	
1963	Perry Mason	Sophia Stone	S7.E1 - "The Case of the Nebulous Nephew"
1972	She Waits	Mrs. Medina	TV movie
1974	Carl Sandburg's Lincoln	Sarah Bush Lincoln	TV miniseries
1974	Dirty Sally	Louisa Badger	S1.E6 - "Too Long to Wait"
1974–1976	The Waltons	Martha Corinne Walton	Episodes: "The Conflict", "The Pony Cart"

== Radio appearances ==
Year	Program	Episode/source
1952	Stars in the Air	"On Borrowed Time"

== See also ==
- List of actors with Academy Award nominations
