= Esther Marion Armstrong =

American philanthropist (1898-1979)

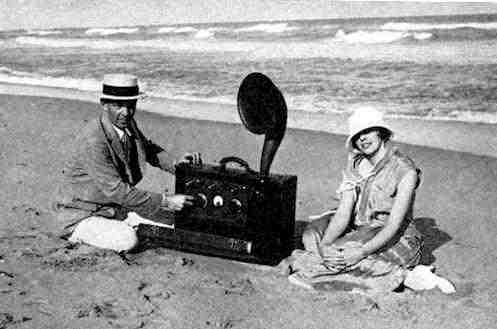
- Inventor Edwin Armstrong gave this radio, said to be the 'first portable radio' to his wife Marion in 1923, as a wedding gift.
- Born: Esther Marion McInnis; August 13, 1898; Merrimac, Massachusetts, U.S.
- Died: August 8, 1979 (aged 80); Exeter, New Hampshire, U.S.
- Occupation: Philanthropist
- Known for: won important patent fights against US electronics firms
- Spouse(s): Edwin H. Armstrong (m. 1922, died 1954)

Esther Marion Armstrong was the widow of pioneering radio FM inventor Edwin Howard Armstrong. She is notable for continuing — and winning — her husband's patent lawsuits against some of America's largest electronics manufacturers after his suicide. In 13 years of litigation, she was victorious in every battle over her husband's patents, winning financial settlements that restored her vast wealth. In her final years she established awards and took other steps to honor her husband's accomplishments.

== Biography ==
When Marion met Edwin Howard Armstrong, she was the secretary of David Sarnoff, then an executive at RCA. Armstrong was then both an inventor and Professor of Electrical Engineering at Columbia University. He had sold his patents for the autodyne (regenerative circuit) and frequency modulation to Westinghouse, which then owned RCA, making him a millionaire, and owner of a large block of RCA stock. Marion was described as "tall and strikingly handsome".

Armstrong built Marion what was described as "the world's first portable radio". He bought her a Hispano-Suiza sports car as a wedding gift, when they wed in 1923.

By 1933, Edwin Armstrong had filed key patents for techniques he developed that were to eventually make FM radio successful. His professional relationship with Marion's former boss, Sarnoff, fractured when Sarnoff who was by then the President of RCA, concluded the development of FM radio was not in the best interests of RCA, which operated an extensive network of commercial AM radio stations. RCA and over a dozen other electronics firms including Motorola ended up filing competing patents for FM radio.

These protracted patent fights brought Armstrong to the brink of financial ruin. According to "They made America" -- authored by Sir Harold Evans and others -- Armstrong was oblivious to the toll his struggle was taking on Marion. Marion spent months in a mental hospital after she threw herself into the East River. Finally, on November 1, 1953, Edwin told Marion that he had used up almost all his financial resources. In better times, funds for their retirement were put in her name, and he asked her to release a portion of those funds so he could continue the legal battles. She declined, and suggested he consider accepting a settlement. Enraged, Edwin picked up a fireplace poker, and swung at her. Marion left the apartment and never saw him again.

After just under three months of separation, on January 31, 1954, Armstrong wrote Marion an apology and threw himself from their apartment in River House at 435 East 52nd Street in Manhattan.

Marion inherited her husband's patents, and, by 1967, she was uniformly successful in lawsuits she had filed against patent violators, including Motorola, RCA and Zenith, which had been manufacturing and selling FM devices without compensating the estate of Marion's late husband, FM radio inventor Edwin Howard Armstrong. In her winning legal battles, Marion was advised by Dana Raymond of Cravath, Swaine & Moore of New York City.

According to Jim Wesley's book Radio Memories, after she had begun to win the patent fights, she established awards to honor Armstrong's memory as a radio innovator. Marion established the Armstrong Memorial Research Foundation.

Marion died on August 8, 1979. She had been living for many years at her private estate, known as Shadowlawn, located at 80 Sea Road in Rye Beach, New Hampshire.
