= Armstrong phase modulator =

Frequency modulation generation method

In 1933, Edwin H. Armstrong patented a method for generating frequency modulation of radio signals. The Armstrong method generates a double sideband suppressed carrier signal, phase shifts this signal, and then reinserts the carrier to produce a frequency modulated signal.

Frequency modulation generates high quality audio and greatly reduces the amount of noise on the channel when compared with amplitude modulation. Early broadcasters used amplitude modulation because it was easier to generate than frequency modulation and because the receivers were simpler to make. The electronics theory indicated that a frequency modulated signal would have infinite bandwidth; for an amplitude modulated signal, the bandwidth is approximately twice the highest modulating frequency.

Armstrong realized that while a frequency modulated signal would have an infinite bandwidth, only the first few sets of sidebands would be significant; the rest could be ignored. An amplitude modulated voice channel bandwidth would be approximately 6 kilohertz; a common frequency modulated voice channel bandwidth could be 15 kilohertz.

== How it works ==
The Armstrong method begins by generating a carrier signal at a very low frequency, say 500 kilohertz. This frequency is below the AM broadcast band and much below the current FM broadcast band of 88 to 108 megahertz. This carrier signal is applied to two stages in the transmitter: a balanced modulator and a mixer.

To understand how a balanced modulator works it is necessary to understand amplitude modulation and how it works. Most people describe amplitude modulation as a method of changing the strength of the carrier (amplitude) in sync with the modulating audio. This is true, the power output does change with modulation, but it changes because any AM modulator generates two sidebands, one above and one below the carrier. As power goes into these sidebands, the power output increases. The amplitude modulated signal, then, consists of a constant strength carrier and two sidebands. The sidebands carry the information and the carrier just goes along for the ride. The carrier can be removed at the transmitter and reinserted at the receiver to allow the transmitter to put all the power in the sidebands.

A frequency modulator also generates sidebands, but instead of one sideband on each side of the carrier, it generates many sidebands on each side of the carrier. The FM bandwidth is wider because of the many sidebands. The power output from an FM transmitter is constant with modulation, so as power goes into the sidebands, the carrier power is reduced.

A balanced modulator mixes the audio signal and the radio frequency carrier, but suppresses the carrier, leaving only the sidebands. The output from the balanced modulator is a double sideband suppressed carrier signal and it contains all the information that the AM signal has, but without the carrier. It is possible to generate an AM signal by taking the output from the balanced modulator and reinserting the carrier.

In the Armstrong method, the audio signal and the radio frequency carrier signal are applied to the balanced modulator to generate a double sideband suppressed carrier signal. The phase of this output signal is then shifted 90 degrees with respect to the original carrier. The balanced modulator output can either lead or lag the carrier's phase. The double sideband signal and the original carrier signal are then applied to the mixer, and the original carrier—90 degrees out of phase—is reinserted. The output from the mixer is a frequency modulated signal.

Reinserting the carrier without the phase shift produces an AM signal. Reinserting the carrier with the 90 degree phase shift produces a PM signal. If the intelligence is integrated before being applied to the resulting phase modulator, this equivalent to an FM signal.

One of the problems with the Armstrong method is that the frequency deviation—the amount of modulation—must be kept small to minimize distortion. The maximum deviation is a fraction of 1 kilohertz, but FM broadcast requires 75 kilohertz deviation and a typical FM voice channel deviation is 5 kilohertz. To solve this problem, Armstrong multiplied the signal many times to a higher frequency to obtain the necessary deviation. For example, to generate an FM signal with 5 kilohertz deviation at 146.94 megahertz, the transmitter would generate a signal at 6.1225 megahertz with only 0.2 kilohertz deviation, and then multiply the signal 24 times (the so-called "Serrasoid" method, which was created by Radio Engineering Labs (REL), and was endorsed by Armstrong).

== Legacy ==
The Armstrong method is no longer used commercially. Frequency modulation is most commonly generated at the operating frequency with the required deviation (the so-called "direct FM" method). While the system was being used in the 1930s and 1940s it provided a high quality FM audio system.
