= Harry W. Houck =

American radio engineer and inventor (1896–1989)

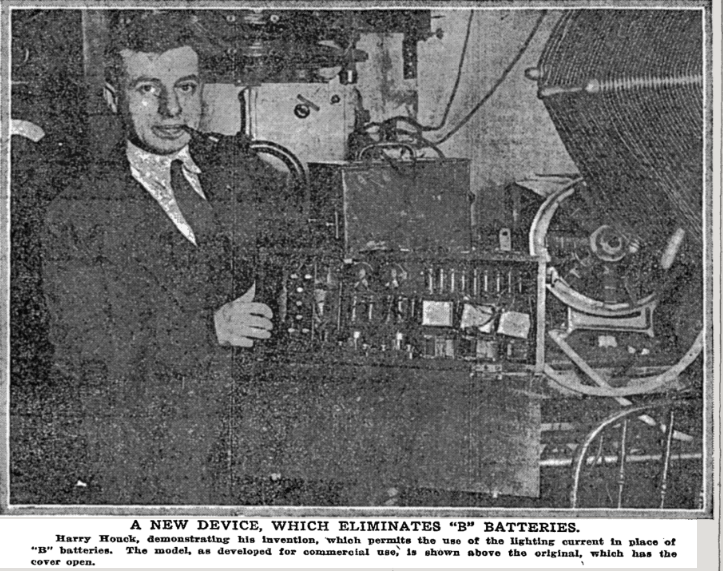
- Houck in 1924 with battery eliminator
- Born: Harry William Houck; April 11, 1896; New Cumberland, Pennsylvania, U.S.
- Died: December 20, 1989 (aged 93); Vero Beach, Florida, U.S.
- Known for: Contributions to radio receiver design, including early superheterodyne development; radio power supplies
- Awards: Armstrong Medal (1941)
- Scientific career
- Fields: Radio engineering
- Institutions: Dubilier Condenser and Radio Company; Measurements Corporation

Harry William Houck (April 11, 1896 – December 20, 1989) was an American radio engineer and long-time collaborator of Edwin Howard Armstrong in the early development of radio receivers. He worked on early superheterodyne receiver circuits and on capacitors, inductors, and power supplies. He developed products to make power-line operation of radio receivers practical.

== Early life ==
Houck was born in New Cumberland, Pennsylvania. As a teenager, he built and operated amateur radio receivers and transmitters before U.S. entry into World War I.

== Collaboration with Armstrong ==
During the war Houck served in the U.S. Army Signal Corps and was assigned to work with Edwin Howard Armstrong in Paris. Armstrong was then developing superheterodyne methods of radio reception, and Houck assisted in the experimental work, including building components such as inductors, transformers, and capacitors.

After the war, Houck was a long-time collaborator of Edwin Howard Armstrong at his laboratory and at Columbia University.He was associated with the original development of the superheterodyne method of reception. He is credited with a “second harmonic” improvement to the superheterodyne, which was used in early RCA commercial sets. A patent for the system was granted to him in 1928.

== Dubilier and radio power supplies ==
From 1923 to 1931, Houck was chief engineer of the Dubilier Condenser and Radio Company, a position noted in the New York Times. His work there focused on capacitors, rectifiers, and filter circuits used in radio receivers and their power supplies.

In 1924, The New York Times described a device developed by Houck that eliminated the need for “B” batteries in radio receivers, allowing operation from household electric current. His later work on capacitors and filtering was credited with making such power supplies practical in commercial sets.

Contemporary trade publications described Houck’s battery eliminator as an important step toward all-electric radio receivers. One such account, titled “$20,000,000 for a Radio Patent!”, referred to a decision involving radio manufacturers, and described Houck as the inventor.

== Later career ==
Houck later worked as a consultant in the radio industry and remained associated with Armstrong’s work, including developments in frequency modulation.

In 1940, he founded Measurements Corporation, which produced precision instruments for radio-frequency measurement. The company later became part of Thomas A. Edison Industries and then McGraw-Edison. Houck remained active in its technical work until his retirement in 1967.

== Patents and work ==
Houck was a prolific inventor whose patents covered radio receivers, tuning devices, transformers, capacitors, rectifiers, and measurement systems.

== Legacy ==
Houck’s papers are held by the Pennsylvania Historical and Museum Commission.

An award named in Houck’s honor is presented by the Antique Wireless Association for contributions related to early radio and wireless technology.

== Awards ==
Houck received the Armstrong Medal of the Radio Club of America in 1941 for “outstanding contributions to the radio art.” The award cited his work on early superheterodyne development and on the capacitor and filter systems used in radio receivers. He was a long-time collaborator with Armstrong on radio receiver development. Despite his contributions, he did not receive other major honors.

He was a Fellow of the Institute of Radio Engineers (later the IEEE) and a Fellow of the Radio Club of America.

== Personal life ==
Houck married Maud Stailey in 1920. In later years, he lived at Silver Spray Farm, a historic property in the Delaware Water Gap National Recreation Area. He also maintained an interest in photography and continuedreading technical literature.
