= Of Human Hearts =

1938 film by Clarence Brown

- 1938 theatrical poster
- Directed by: Clarence Brown
- Written by: Conrad Richter (uncredited)
- Screenplay by: Bradbury Foote
- Based on: Benefits Forgot; 1917 novel by Honoré Willsie Morrow
- Produced by: Clarence Brown (uncredited); John W. Considine Jr.
- Starring: Walter Huston; James Stewart; Beulah Bondi; Guy Kibbee; Charles Coburn; John Carradine
- Cinematography: Clyde De Vinna
- Edited by: Frank E. Hull
- Music by: Herbert Stothart
- Color process: Black and white
- Production company: Metro-Goldwyn-Mayer
- Distributed by: Loew's, Inc.
- Release date: February 11, 1938
- Running time: 103 minutes
- Country: United States
- Language: English

Of Human Hearts is a 1938 American drama Western film directed by Clarence Brown and starring Walter Huston, James Stewart and Beulah Bondi. Stewart plays a proud and ungrateful son who rebels against his preacher father and (after his father's death) neglects his poverty-stricken mother. Bondi was nominated for the Academy Award for Best Supporting Actress.

== Plot ==
Young Jason Wilkins has a stern but loving preacher father, Rev. Ethan Wilkins, and a doting mother, Mary Wilkins. Jason is highly intelligent and outgoing, but also proud and stubborn. His father must often beat him with a leather strap for his impertinence, pride, and rudeness. As a young man, Jason falls in love with beautiful Annie. When Jason's father takes him circuit riding, Jason rebels at the bad food and awful living conditions, and has a fistfight with his father. This ruptures their relationship.

Jason goes to medical school, and becomes a doctor. He is increasingly neglectful of his parents, and when his father dies, he arrives too late to speak with him one last time. Despite his mother's poverty, Jason repeatedly asks her for money, forcing her to sell her silver spoons, and eventually her wedding band, for food. The American Civil War breaks out, and she must sell Jason's beloved horse Pilgrim to pay for his fancy $70 officer's uniform. When Jason fails to write to her for two years, Mrs. Wilkins assumes that he is dead and writes a letter to President Abraham Lincoln asking for information in locating his grave. Lincoln issues an order requiring the young captain to appear before him without delay. Jason arrogantly assumes that he is about to be commended for his actions as a battlefield surgeon. Instead, with the two of them alone in his office, the president accuses him of possessing the worst human quality of all: ingratitude. Jason tearfully repents; granted furlough, he returns to his mother (even managing to find Pilgrim on the way) and begs her forgiveness, which she happily grants.

== Cast ==
- Walter Huston as Ethan Wilkins
- James Stewart as Jason Wilkins
- Gene Reynolds as Jason Wilkins as a child
- Beulah Bondi as Mary Wilkins
- Guy Kibbee as George Ames
- Charles Coburn as Dr. Charles Shingle
- John Carradine as President Lincoln
- Ann Rutherford as Annie Hawks
- Leatrice Joy Gilbert as Annie Hawks - as a child
- Charley Grapewin as Jim Meeker
- Leona Roberts as Sister Clarke
- Gene Lockhart as Quid
- Clem Bevans as Elder Massey
- Arthur Aylesworth as Rufus Inchpin
- Sterling Holloway as Chauncey Ames
- Charlie Peck as Chauncey Ames - as a Child
- Robert McWade as Dr. Lupus Crumm
- Minor Watson as Capt. Griggs

== Production notes ==
Principal photography occurred from October 18 to December 20, 1937. The working title of the film and the title of the novel on which it was based, Benefits Forgot, was taken from a quotation in William Shakespeare's As You Like It, Act II, Scene 7: "Freeze, freeze, thou bitter sky, that dost not bite so nigh as benefits forgot." The title of the picture, Of Human Hearts, was selected by MGM after a nationwide contest was advertised on the studio's radio program, Good News of 1938, to determine who could select the best title. The prize, $5,000, was awarded to Roy Harris, a high school student from Greenville, South Carolina. In addition to the prize money, Harris was also an invited guest at the film's world premiere, held in his hometown.

Portions of the film were shot on location at the Agoura Ranch in Agoura, California, and at Lake Arrowhead, California. According to information in news items and the presskit, over 700 people worked at the Arrowhead location for more than two weeks on a specially built village, the largest special location site built by MGM since The Good Earth. An article in Life noted that the film's battle scene, which was not based on a specific battle, cost $50,000, and required 2,000 men to film. Life also noted that the picture was one of a "new cycle of interest in the Civil War aroused by the novel Gone with the Wind.

Robert McWade, who portrayed Dr. Lupus Crumm in the picture, died after completing his role. According to news items in the Hollywood Citizen-News and Motion Picture Daily, director Clarence Brown had told McWade "Well, Bob, you played your last scene. You might as well go home," just before McWade died of heart failure.

The book on which the movie was based, Benefits Forgot, was in turn based on one of the many popular legends about Lincoln: he was indeed said to have summoned a young soldier from the battlefield to scold him for not writing to his mother.

== See also ==
- List of films and television shows about the American Civil War
