= ArtBabble =

Defunct video on demand services

ArtBabble was a cloud based video hosting service for art content and has been called the "YouTube of the arts". It was launched in April 2009 and won the 2010 "Best of the Web" (overall category) award at the Museums and the Web conference. The original design and hosting was provided by the Indianapolis Museum of Art.

ArtBabble partners included the following:

- Indianapolis Museum of Art
- Art Institute of Chicago
- J. Paul Getty Museum
- Hammer Museum
- Los Angeles County Museum of Art
- Museum of Modern Art
- The New York Public Library
- San Francisco Museum of Modern Art
- San Jose Museum of Art
- Solomon R. Guggenheim Museum
- Smithsonian American Art Museum
- Van Gogh Museum

ArtBabble seems to have ended operation early 2015. The website still existed in July 2019 and informed us that, "Now, a decade later, the underlying technology upon which the site was built is becoming unsustainable. Many of the cultural institutions whose content had been available on ArtBabble now have that content hosted on their institutional media channels, such as YouTube and Vimeo. Please visit those sites to find their content." By September 2019 the domain has expired and the site is no longer available. The last Twitter feed was from April 2015. A search on the website of the former operator, Indianapolis Museum of Art, revealed no mention of the project.
