= Maxwell Anderson =

American playwright and writer (1888–1959)

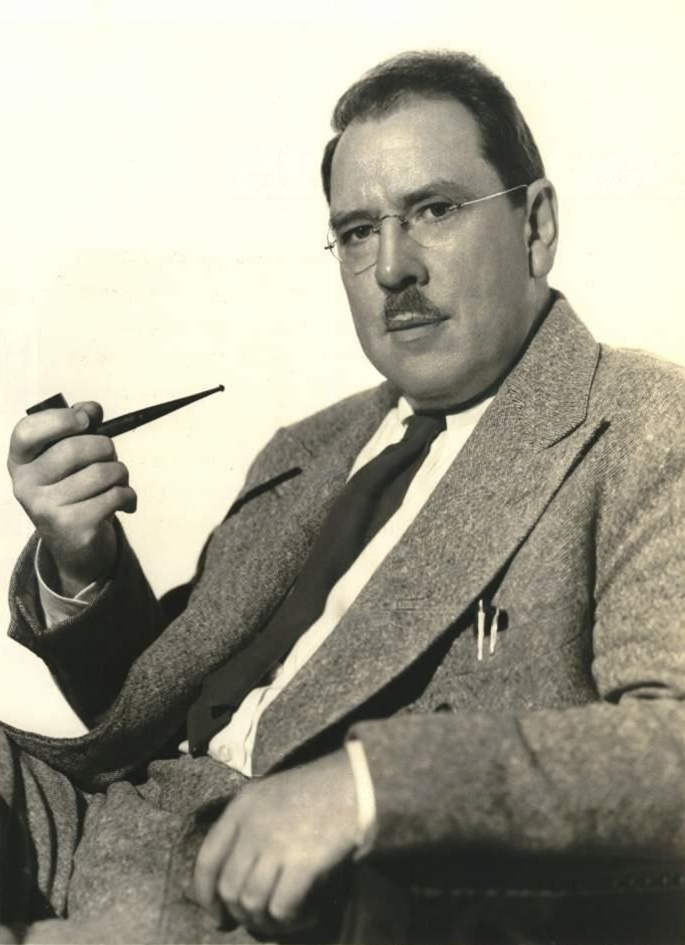
- Anderson in 1938
- Born: James Maxwell Anderson; December 15, 1888; Atlantic, Pennsylvania, U.S.
- Died: February 28, 1959 (aged 70); Stamford, Connecticut, U.S.
- Education: University of North Dakota (BA); Stanford University (MA)
- Occupation: Playwright
- Spouses: Margaret Haskett (m. 1911; died 1931) Gilda Hazard (m. 1954)
- Partner: Gertrude Higger (1933–1953)
- Children: 6, including Quentin including 2 adopted children of his second marriage.
- Relatives: Maxwell L. Anderson (grandson)
- Writing career
- Pen name: John Nairne Michaelson
- Notable awards: Pulitzer Prize for Drama (1933)

James Maxwell Anderson (December 15, 1888 – February 28, 1959) was an American playwright, author, poet, journalist, and lyricist.

He found success as a dramatist and wrote a number of hit plays, including What Price Glory, Both Your Houses, and The Bad Seed. Many of his works were adapted for the screen, and he wrote screenplays for other authors' works as well. Anderson was married three times and had a tumultuous personal life, dying in 1959 after suffering a stroke. His papers and personal effects can be found in various institutions, with the largest collection housed at the Harry Ransom Center at the University of Texas at Austin.

== Background ==
Anderson was born on December 15, 1888, in Atlantic, Pennsylvania, the second of eight children to William Lincoln "Link" Anderson, a Baptist minister, and Charlotte Perrimela ('Premely') Stephenson, both of Scotch-Irish descent. His family initially lived on his maternal grandmother Sheperd's farm in Atlantic, then moved to Andover, Ohio, where his father became a railroad fireman while studying to become a minister. They moved often, to follow their father's ministerial posts, and Maxwell was frequently sick, missing a great deal of school. He used his time sick in bed to read voraciously, and both his parents and Aunt Emma were storytellers, which contributed to Anderson's love of literature.

During a visit to his grandmother's house in Atlantic, at age 11, he met the first love of his life, Hallie Loomis, a slightly older girl from a wealthier family. His autobiographical tale Morning, Winter and Night told of rape, incest and sadomasochism on the farm. It was published under the pseudonym John Nairne Michealson to prevent offending family. The Andersons lived in Andover, Ohio; Richmond Center, Ohio; Townville, Pennsylvania; Edinboro, Pennsylvania; McKeesport, Pennsylvania; New Brighton, Pennsylvania; Harrisburg, Pennsylvania; and Jamestown, North Dakota. Anderson attended Jamestown High School, graduating in 1908.

== Career ==
=== Journalist ===
As an undergraduate, Anderson waited tables and worked at the night copy desk of the Grand Forks Herald, and he was active in the school's literary and dramatic societies. He obtained a BA in English Literature from the University of North Dakota in 1911. Anderson became the principal of a high school in Minnewaukan, North Dakota, also teaching English there, but was fired in 1913 for making pacifist statements to his students. He then entered Stanford University, obtaining an master's degree in English Literature in 1914. He became a high school English teacher in San Francisco. After three years, Anderson became chairman of the English department at Whittier College in 1917. He was fired after a year for public statements supporting Arthur Camp, a jailed student seeking status as a conscientious objector.

Anderson moved to Palo Alto to write for the San Francisco Evening Bulletin, but he was fired for writing an editorial stating that it would be impossible for Germany to pay its war debt. He then moved to San Francisco to write for the San Francisco Chronicle, but he was fired after contracting the Spanish flu and missing work. Alvin S. Johnson hired Anderson to move to New York City and write about politics for The New Republic in 1918, but he was fired after an argument with Editor-in-Chief Herbert David Croly.

Anderson found work at The New York Globe and the New York World. In 1921 he founded The Measure: A Journal of Poetry, a magazine devoted to verse. Anderson wrote White Desert, his first play, in 1923; it ran only 12 performances, but it was well reviewed by Laurence Stallings of the New York World, who collaborated with him on his next play What Price Glory?, which was successfully produced in 1924 in New York City. Afterward, Anderson resigned from the World, launching his career as a dramatist.

=== Dramatist ===
His plays are in widely varying styles, and Anderson was one of the few modern playwrights to make extensive use of blank verse. Some of these were adapted as films, and Anderson wrote the screenplays of other authors' plays and novels – All Quiet on the Western Front (1930) and Death Takes a Holiday (1934) – in addition to books of poetry and essays. His first Broadway hit was the 1924 World War I comedy-drama, What Price Glory, written with Laurence Stallings. The play made use of profanity, which caused censors to protest. However, the chief censor (Rear Admiral Charles Peshall Plunkett) was discredited because he was found to have written far more obscene letters to General Chamberlaine.

The only one of his plays that he adapted to the screen was Joan of Lorraine, which became the film Joan of Arc (1948), starring Ingrid Bergman, with a screenplay by Anderson and Andrew Solt. When Bergman and her director changed much of his dialogue to make Joan "a plaster saint", he called her a "big, dumb, goddamn Swede!" Anderson was awarded the Pulitzer Prize in 1933 for his political drama Both Your Houses, and twice received the New York Drama Critics Circle Award, for Winterset, and High Tor.

Anderson enjoyed great commercial success with a series of plays set during the reign of the Tudor family, who ruled England, Wales and Ireland from 1485 until 1603. One play in particular – Anne of the Thousand Days – the story of Henry VIII's marriage to Anne Boleyn – was a hit on the stage in 1948, but did not reach movie screens for 21 years. It opened on Broadway starring Rex Harrison and Joyce Redman, and it became a 1969 movie with Richard Burton and Geneviève Bujold.

Elizabeth the Queen opened in 1930 with Lynn Fontanne as Elizabeth and Alfred Lunt as Lord Essex. It was adapted to the screen as The Private Lives of Elizabeth and Essex (1939), starring Bette Davis and Errol Flynn. Directed by John Ford, Mary of Scotland (1936) was an adaptation of his play of the same name involving Elizabeth I, starring Katharine Hepburn as Mary, Queen of Scots, Fredric March as the Earl of Bothwell, and Florence Eldridge as Elizabeth. The original play had been a hit on Broadway with Helen Hayes in the title role.

His play The Wingless Victory was written in verse and premiered in 1936 with Broadway actress Katharine Cornell in the lead role. It received mixed reviews.

=== Adaptations ===
Two of Anderson's other historical plays, Valley Forge, about George Washington's winter there with the Continental Army, and Barefoot in Athens, concerning the trial of Socrates, were adapted for television. Valley Forge was adapted for television on three occasions – in 1950, 1951 and 1975. Anderson wrote book and lyrics for two successful musicals with composer Kurt Weill. Knickerbocker Holiday, about the early Dutch settlers of New York, featured Walter Huston as Peter Stuyvesant. The show's standout number "September Song" became a popular standard. So did the title song of Anderson and Weill's Lost in the Stars, a story of South Africa based on the Alan Paton novel Cry, The Beloved Country. In 1950, Anderson and Weill began collaboration on a musical adaptation of Mark Twain's Huckleberry Finn, but Weill died when only a few songs had been completed for it.

Saturday's Children, Anderson's long-running 1927 comedy-drama about married life, in which Humphrey Bogart made an early appearance, was filmed three times – in 1929 as a part-talkie, in 1935 (in almost unrecognizable form) as a B-film Maybe It's Love, and again in 1940 under its original title, starring John Garfield in one of his few romantic comedies. The play was adapted for television in three condensed versions in 1950, 1952 and 1962.

His last successful Broadway stage play was 1954's The Bad Seed, Anderson's adaption of the William March novel. He was hired by Alfred Hitchcock to write the screenplay for Hitchcock's The Wrong Man (1957). Hitchcock also contracted with Anderson to write the screenplay for what became Vertigo (1958), but Hitchcock rejected his screenplay Darkling, I Listen.

== Personal life and death ==
Anderson married Margaret Haskett, a classmate, on August 1, 1911, in Bottineau, North Dakota. They had three sons, Quentin, Alan, and Terence.

In 1929, Anderson wrote Gypsy, what would prove to be a prophetic play about a vain, neurotic liar who cheats on her husband then kills herself by inhaling gas after he catches her. It is around this same time, c. 1930, that Anderson began a relationship with a married actress, Gertrude Higger (married name, Mab Maynard, stage name Mab Anthony). The affair led Anderson to split with Haskett, who later died in 1931 following a car accident and stroke.

Mab divorced her husband, singer Charles V. Maynard, and moved in with Anderson. She was a significant help with clerical duties, but had expensive tastes and spent Anderson's money freely. Their daughter Hesper was born August 1934. Anderson left Maynard following the discovery of her affair with Max's friend, TV producer Jerry Stagg. The combination of losing Anderson, their massive tax debt, and the loss of her home proved too much for Mab, who on March 21, 1953, after several attempts, killed herself by breathing car exhaust. Hesper wrote a book, South Mountain Road: A Daughter's Journey of Discovery describing how following her mother's suicide, she unearthed the fact that her parents never married.

Anderson then married Gilda Hazard on June 6, 1954. This marriage was a happy one, lasting until Anderson's 1959 death.

Anderson was an atheist.

Anderson died in Stamford, Connecticut, on February 28, 1959, two days after suffering a stroke, aged 70. He was cremated. Half of his ashes were scattered by the sea near his home in Stamford. The other half was buried in Anderson Cemetery near his birthplace in rural northwestern Pennsylvania. The inscription on his tombstone reads:

Children of dust astray among the stars
Children of earth adrift upon the night
What is there in our darkness or our light
To linger in prose or claim a singing breath
Save the curt history of life isled in death

== Awards ==
Honorary awards include the gold medal in Drama from the National Institute of Arts and Letters in 1954, an honorary doctor of literature degree from Columbia University in 1946, and an honorary doctor of humanities degree from the University of North Dakota in 1958.

== Archive ==
The largest collection of Maxwell Anderson's papers – over sixty boxes – is housed at the Harry Ransom Center at the University of Texas at Austin and includes published and unpublished manuscript materials for plays, poems, and essays, as well as over 2,000 letters, diaries, financial papers, nearly 1,500 family photographs, and personal memorabilia are preserved along with 160 books from the playwright's library. The archive was placed at the Ransom Center in 1961 by Anderson's widow, Mrs. Gilda Hazard Anderson. Smaller collections of Anderson's papers can be found at institutions around the world, including the Chester Fritz Library, the New York Public Library for the Performing Arts, and the University of North Carolina at Chapel Hill.

== Works ==
=== Stage productions ===
- White Desert – 1923
- What Price Glory – 1924 (with Laurence Stallings) – a war drama
- First Flight – 1925 (with Laurence Stallings)
- The Buccaneer – 1925 (with Laurence Stallings)
- Outside Looking In – 1925
- Saturday's Children – 1926
- Gods of the Lightning – 1929 (with Harold Hickerson)
- Gypsy – 1929
- Elizabeth the Queen – 1930 – a historical drama in blank verse
- Night Over Taos – 1932
- Both Your Houses – 1933 – Pulitzer Prize for Drama
- Mary of Scotland – 1933 – a historical drama in blank verse
- Valley Forge – 1934
- Winterset – 1935 – New York Drama Critics' Circle Award
- The Masque of Kings – 1936
- The Wingless Victory – 1936
- The Star-Wagon – 1937
- High Tor – 1937 New York Drama Critics Circle Award
- The Feast of Ortolans – 1937 – one-act play
- Knickerbocker Holiday – 1938 – book and lyrics
- Second Overture – 1938 – one-act play
- Key Largo – 1939
- Journey to Jerusalem – 1940
- Candle in the Wind – 1941
- The Miracle of the Danube – 1941 – one-act play
- The Eve of St. Mark – 1942
- Your Navy – 1942 – one-act play
- Storm Operation – 1944
- Letter to Jackie – 1944 – one-act play
- Truckline Café – 1946
- Joan of Lorraine (partially written in blank verse) – 1946
- Anne of the Thousand Days – 1948 – a historical drama in blank verse
- Lost in the Stars – 1949 – book and lyrics
- Barefoot in Athens – 1951
- The Bad Seed – 1954
- High Tor – 1956 (TV score)
- The Day the Money Stopped – 1958 – (with Brendan Gill)
- The Golden Six – 1958

=== Filmography ===
- What Price Glory – 1926 – film
- Saturday's Children – 1929 – play
- The Cock-Eyed World – 1929 – story
- All Quiet on the Western Front – 1930 – adaptation & dialogue
- The Guardsman – 1931 – one scene from Elizabeth the Queen is featured, just after the opening credits of the film
- Rain – 1932 – adaptation
- Washington Merry-Go-Round – 1932 – story
- Death Takes a Holiday – 1934 (screenplay only; the play was written in Italian by Alberto Casella and translated into English by Walter Ferris)
- We Live Again – 1934 – adaptation, from Tolstoy's Resurrection
- The Lives of a Bengal Lancer – 1935 – uncredited contributing writer
- Maybe It's Love – 1935 – play Saturday's Children
- So Red the Rose – 1935 – screenplay
- Mary of Scotland – 1936 – play
- Winterset – 1936 – play
- The Private Lives of Elizabeth and Essex – 1939 – play
- Key Largo – 1939 – play (almost completely rewritten for the 1948 film of the same name)
- Saturday's Children – 1940 – play
- Knickerbocker Holiday – 1944 – play
- The Eve of St. Mark – 1944 – play
- Winterset – 1945 – TV – play
- A la sombra del puente – 1946 – play
- Joan of Lorraine - 1946 – play
- Joan of Arc – 1948 – screenplay (revised from the 1946 play Joan of Lorraine)
- Pulitzer Prize Playhouse – 1950 TV Series – play – four episodes
- Celanese Theatre – 1951 TV Series – play – two episodes
- What Price Glory? – 1952 – play
- The Alcoa Hour – 1955 TV Series – play – episode "Key Largo"
- The Bad Seed – 1956 – play
- The Wrong Man – 1956 – novel The True Story of Christopher Emmanuel Balestrero
- Never Steal Anything Small – 1959 – play The Devil's Hornpipe
- Ben-Hur – 1959 – uncredited
- Barefoot in Athens – 1966 – TV – play
- The Star Wagon – 1967 – TV – play
- Elizabeth the Queen – 1968 – TV – play
- Anne of the Thousand Days – 1969 – play
- Valley Forge – 1975 – TV – play
- Lost in the Stars – 1974 – play
- The Bad Seed – 1985 – TV – play
- Meet Joe Black (1998) (earlier screenplay) (inspiration)

=== Lyrics ===
- "September Song" (from Knickerbocker Holiday)
- "Lost in the Stars" (from Lost in the Stars)
- "Cry, The Beloved Country"(from Lost in the Stars)
- "When You're in Love"
- "There's Nowhere to Go but Up"
- "It Never Was You"
- "Stay Well"
- "Trouble Man" (from Lost in the Stars)
- "Thousands of Miles"

=== Poetry and essays ===
- You Who Have Dreams – 1925 – poetry
- The Essence of Tragedy and Other Footnotes and Papers – 1939 – essays
- Off Broadway Essays About the Theatre – 1947 – essays
- Notes on a Dream – 1972 – poetry

== See also ==
- Maxwell L. Anderson
