= Maybe It's Love (1935 film) =

1935 film by William C. McGann

- Lobby card
- Directed by: William C. McGann
- Screenplay by: Jerry Wald; Harry Sauber
- Based on: Saturday's Children; 1927 play by Maxwell Anderson
- Produced by: Harry Joe Brown
- Starring: Gloria Stuart; Ross Alexander; Frank McHugh; Ruth Donnelly; Helen Lowell; Henry Travers
- Cinematography: Arthur Edeson
- Edited by: James Gibbon
- Music by: Heinz Roemheld
- Production company: First National Pictures
- Distributed by: Warner Bros. Pictures
- Release date: January 12, 1935
- Running time: 63 minutes
- Country: United States
- Language: English

Maybe It's Love is a 1935 American comedy film directed by William C. McGann and written by Jerry Wald and Harry Sauber. The film stars Gloria Stuart, Ross Alexander, Frank McHugh, Ruth Donnelly, Helen Lowell and Henry Travers. The film was released by Warner Bros. Pictures on January 12, 1935.

Maxwell Anderson's play was the basis for several movies including Saturday's Children, a 1929 film starring Corinne Griffith and Grant Withers. In 1940, Warner Bros. remade Saturday's Children.

== Plot ==
Bobby and Rims are co-workers in a company owned by Adolph Mengle Sr. But their path to romance has two big impediments: she is the sole support of her lazy family—who would rather stay in their apartment and complain about sports and "the European situation"—and the boss' spoiled son, who is trying to break them up so he can marry her himself.

== Cast ==
- Gloria Stuart as Bobby Halevy
- Ross Alexander as Rims O'Neil
- Frank McHugh as Willie Sands
- Ruth Donnelly as Florrie Sands
- Helen Lowell as Mrs. Halevy
- Henry Travers as Mr. Halevy
- Joseph Cawthorn as Adolph Sr.
- Phillip Reed as Adolph Jr.
- Dorothy Dare as Lila
- J. Farrell MacDonald as The Cop
- Maude Eburne as Landlady
