= Crosby system =

FM broadcasting standard

The Crosby system was an FM stereophonic broadcasting standard developed by Murray G. Crosby. In the United States, it competed with, and ultimately lost to, the Zenith/GE system, which the FCC chose as the standard in 1961.

While both systems used multiplexing to transmit the L-R stereo signal, the Crosby system used a frequency-modulated 50 kHz subcarrier, whereas the competing Zenith/GE system used an amplitude-modulated 38 kHz subcarrier. As FM is less susceptible to interference and noise than AM, the Crosby system had better frequency response and less noise of the two systems especially under weak signal conditions. However, the Crosby system was incompatible with existing subsidiary communications authorization (SCA) services which used subcarrier frequencies including 41 and 67 kHz. These SCA services were used by many FM stations since the mid-1950s for subscription-based "storecasting" to raise revenue and for other non-broadcast purposes. They consequently lobbied the FCC to adopt the Zenith/GE system. FCC tests in 1960 confirmed that the Zenith/GE stereo system was compatible with 67 kHz SCA operation, although not 41 kHz.

According to Jack Hannold:

Crosby used a wideband FM subcarrier, providing a better signal-to-noise (S/N) ratio in stereo from all but the weakest RF signals. FM is not entirely free of noise. While AM has a rectangular noise spectrum, with the amplitude of random noise in the demodulated signal constant across the audio spectrum, FM has a triangular noise spectrum, with the amplitude of noise increasing with frequency, i.e., it rises at a rate of 6 dB per octave, or 20 dB per decade. Thus at 4 kHz, the noise level is 20 dB higher than at 400 Hz, and at 40 kHz it is 40 dB higher. So the L-R subcarrier, whether DSB or FM, is accompanied by a high level of noise. FM uses pre-emphasis to overcome high frequency noise. Sounds above 2 kHz are boosted 6 dB per octave at the transmitter by a pre-emphasis circuit. A complementary de-emphasis in receivers rolls off treble response at the same rate, restoring highs to their proper level and simultaneously reducing high-frequency noise. But it only works in mono, because the DSB subcarrier is not boosted by pre-emphasis, and is thus subject to AM noise when the main carrier signal is weak. But an FM subcarrier, like the main carrier, benefits from limiting (the elimination of AM noise imposed by interference), as long as its amplitude - which remains constant in FM - is slightly above the peak amplitude of the noise within the subcarrier channel, yielding a much better stereo S/N than Zenith on all but the weakest of weak signals.

On April 19, 1961, the FCC released its Final Order selecting the Zenith/GE system as the FM stereophonic broadcasting standard. At 9:59 AM that day, Crosby-Teletronics stock was worth $15 a share; by 2:00 P.M. it was down to less than $2.50. Another (albeit relatively minor) factor in the FCC choosing the Zenith/GE system was the widespread use of vacuum tubes in radios at the time; the additional tubes for an all-FM system would have increased the size, weight, cost of and heat generated by each tuner or receiver.
