= Saturday's Children (1940 film) =

- Directed by: Vincent Sherman
- Written by: Julius J. Epstein; Philip Epstein
- Based on: Saturday's Children; 1927 play by Maxwell Anderson
- Produced by: Hal B. Wallis
- Starring: John Garfield; Anne Shirley; Claude Rains
- Cinematography: James Wong Howe
- Edited by: Owen Marks
- Music by: Leo F. Forbstein; Adolph Deutsch
- Distributed by: Warner Bros. Pictures
- Release dates: May 4, 1940 (New York City); May 11, 1940 (United States)
- Running time: 103 minutes
- Country: United States
- Language: English

Saturday's Children is a 1940 American romance drama film directed by Vincent Sherman and starring John Garfield, Anne Shirley, and Claude Rains. It is a third-time remake of the original Maxwell Anderson play with a previous version released in 1935 under the title Maybe It's Love and Saturday's Children released in 1929. The title comes from the nursery rhyme in which Saturday’s child works hard for a living.

== Plot ==
Twenty-two-year-old Bobby Halevy (Anne Shirley) looks forward to her first day of work at the firm where her father has been a bookkeeper for many years. Her married sister, Florrie, tells her the only point in working is to snag herself a husband, preferably one with a lot of money. She meets—and soon falls in love with—her fellow employee, Rims Rosson (John Garfield). Rosson is an idealistic dreamer and would-be inventor whose get-rich scheme is going off to Manila to turn hemp into silk. Their romance flourishes until Florrie talks Bobbie into tricking Rims into marriage—Just as Rims is about to leave for that job in the Philippines. Then Bobby is fired because the firm—suffering from losses in war-torn Europe— has a new policy against married couples. They dread the prospect of living with her parents—as Florrie and Willie Sands do. A letter arrives from the firm in Manila, offering Rims the job, but at a salary that won’t support a wife. Bobby learns she is pregnant and destroys the letter.

Willie is a bill collector. He shows up to serve a notice on Rims, but he stops his spiel at 6 o’clock and embraces his brother in law. They go out, and show up hours late for a family dinner, drunk. While the boys sleep it off, Bobby tells her father they will be moving in with them, and that she is pregnant.

Bobby tells Rims about the letter. On impulse, he cries "I’m trapped!" and then apologizes. She ends up revealing how she "roped him" into marriage, but conceals her pregnancy. They quarrel. He storms out. Her father comforts her and takes her home.

Rims’ boat leaves at midnight. Talking to Bobby’s father, he wonders who’s to blame. He’s forgiven Bobby for the trick; in fact he takes it as a compliment.

Bobby’s father sabotages the malfunctioning elevator at the store, trying to commit suicide to get compensation money for the young couple, but the night watchman stops its fall. He is okay, and Bobby and Rims know what he did.

Rims meets Bobby and her father on their doorstep. He gives an upbeat, inspiring speech. He has other inventions. Maybe they’ll get to the Philippines next year, or the year after. “We’re Saturday’s children, we have a long way to go!"

“I think you can tell him now,“ Bobby’s father says to her as he goes in to the building. Rims is mystified. She tells him to sit down. On the step, side by side, she whispers into his ear. Rims beams with joy.. “Boy oh boy oh boy!" he exclaims, beaming. They kiss, passionately.

== Cast ==
- John Garfield as Rims Rosson
- Anne Shirley as Bobby Halevy
- Claude Rains as Mr. Halevy
- Lee Patrick as Florrie Sands
- George Tobias as Herbie Smith
- Roscoe Karns as Willie Sands
- Dennie Moore as Gertrude Mills
- Elizabeth Risdon as Mrs. Halevy
- Berton Churchill as Mr. Norman
- Lucile Fairbanks as a nurse (uncredited)
- John Qualen as first carpenter (uncredited)

== Production ==
Warner Bros. Pictures originally cast Priscilla Lane in the lead but Garfield was sure that the Lane Sisters would somehow have to be written in as well. He used his influence to get the studio to borrow Shirley from RKO. Julius Epstein thought Garfield's performance was the closest he came to playing his real self. Usually discontented with the way he was typecast by the studio, Garfield was unusually proud of his restrained characterization.

== Radio adaptation ==
Saturday's Children was presented on Screen Guild Players June 2, 1947. The 30-minute adaptation starred Garfield and Jane Wyman.

The play was filmed for for television in 1962.
