= Quentin Anderson =

American literary critic and cultural historian

- Born: July 21, 1912; Minnewaukan, North Dakota, U.S.
- Died: February 18, 2003 (aged 90); Morningside Heights, Manhattan, New York, U.S.
- Children: 3, including Maxwell
- Parent: Maxwell Anderson

Academic background
- Education: Columbia University (BA, PhD); Harvard University (MA)

Academic work
- Discipline: Literary criticism Cultural history
- Institutions: Columbia University

Quentin Anderson (July 21, 1912 – February 18, 2003) was an American literary critic and cultural historian at Columbia University. His research focused on 19th-century American authors, especially Henry James, Ralph Waldo Emerson, and Walt Whitman, and their attempts to define American identity as both connected to and differentiated from European precedents.

== Early life and education ==
Anderson was born in Minnewaukan, North Dakota. The son of playwright Maxwell Anderson, he moved with his father to Palo Alto, California and then San Francisco after the latter was dismissed from his high school teaching job for his pacifist views. The family then moved to New York City, where Quentin spent his formative years. During the Great Depression, he worked as a mechanic, a grave digger, and as a stage extra on Broadway.

Quentin thereafter began his long career in academia. He studied with Jacques Barzun and Lionel Trilling at Columbia University, where he earned his Bachelor of Arts in 1937. He earned his Master of Arts from Harvard University in 1945 before returning to Columbia to complete his PhD in 1953.

== Career ==
Anderson served in the civilian defense corps in Rockland County, New York. He was named a full professor at the Columbia University English Department in 1961 and he chaired a disciplinary committee following the protests of 1968. In 1978, he was named the Julian Clarence Levi Professor in the Humanities and was granted a senior fellowship by the National Endowment for the Humanities in 1973 and 1974. From 1979 to 1980 he was a fellow at the National Humanities Center.

Anderson's book The Imperial Self (1971) was a widely heralded and debated account of the shaping of American identity as revealed by nineteenth-century American literature.

== Personal life ==
Anderson married Thelma Ehrlich in 1947. He had two sons (Maxwell L. Anderson and Abraham Anderson) and a daughter by his first marriage (Martha Haskett Anderson). At the time of his death, he had one grandson, Chase Quentin Anderson.

Anderson lived on Claremont Avenue in Manhattan. He died of heart failure at his Morningside Heights, Manhattan home in 2003.

== Major works ==
- Making Americans (1992) ISBN 0-15-155941-4
- The Imperial Self (1971) ISBN 0-394-71824-0
- The American Henry James (1957) ISBN B0006AUYTQ
