= Saturday's Children (1929 film) =

1929 film

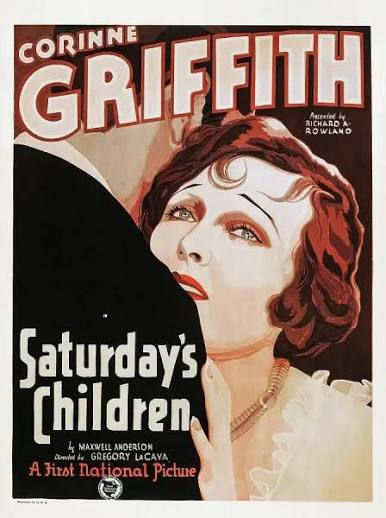
- Theatrical Release poster
- Directed by: Gregory La Cava
- Written by: Forrest Halsey (dialogue and scenario); Paul Perez (titles)
- Based on: Saturday's Children; 1927 play by Maxwell Anderson
- Produced by: Richard A. Rowland
- Starring: Corinne Griffith; Grant Withers; Albert Conti; Alma Tell; Lucien Littlefield
- Cinematography: John F. Seitz
- Edited by: Hugh Bennett
- Music by: Alois Reiser
- Production companies: Walter Morosco Productions; First National Pictures
- Distributed by: Warner Bros. Pictures
- Release date: April 14, 1929; (Part-Talkie)
- Running time: 90 minutes
- Country: United States
- Languages: Sound (Part-Talkie); English Intertitles

Saturday's Children is a 1929 American sound part-talkie romantic-comedy film directed by Gregory La Cava, and starring Corinne Griffith, Grant Withers, Albert Conti, Alma Tell, Lucien Littlefield. In addition to sequences with audible dialogue or talking sequences, the film features a synchronized musical score and sound effects along with English intertitles. According to the film review in Variety, 60 percent of the total running time featured dialogue. The sound was recorded via the Vitaphone sound-on-disc process. The film was released by Warner Bros. Pictures on April 14, 1929. The film is based on the 1927 play Saturday's Children by Maxwell Anderson.

It was remade three-times of the original Maxwell Anderson play with the other versions released in 1935 under the title Maybe It's Love and Saturday's Children released in 1940.

== Plot ==
Bobby Halevy, a spirited office girl, is coaxed into romantic maneuvering by her sister Florrie, a married woman who fancies herself an authority on men. Bobby loves shy, idealistic Rims Rosson, who's about to sail for South Africa. With some sisterly strategy, Bobby gets him to propose instead. Rims ditches the trip, they marry, and settle into a little dream cottage.

But reality bites. Love soon tangles with rent, bills, and bickering. Married life, it turns out, isn't all roses and moonlight. Eventually, Bobby leaves—not out of anger, but believing Rims would be better off without her. She moves back in with her family and takes up her old job.

Rims, heartsick and jealous, visits her boarding house to win her back. But Bobby, still stinging from their domestic disappointments, insists she wants a lover, not a grumbling husband. So later that night, Rims scales the fire escape and climbs into her room—not as her husband, but as the romantic suitor she fell for.

As they bolt the door behind them, Mrs. Gorlick, the upright landlady, plants herself just outside and begins reciting her house rule in a firm, sing-song voice:

“Ladies must receive gentlemen callers with the door wide open—wide open!”

But Bobby and Rims pay her no heed—smiling, giggling, and sealing their reunion with a kiss, while the landlady's lecture continues through the closed door. The bolt stays latched. Love, at least tonight, isn't following boarding house etiquette.

And for Bobby and Rims—once again sweethearts—the door to the world stays shut, but the spark is open wide.

== Cast ==
- Corinne Griffith as Bobby Halevy
- Grant Withers as Rims Rosson
- Albert Conti as Mengle
- Alma Tell as Florrie
- Lucien Littlefield as Willie
- Charles Willis Lane as Mr. Henry Halevy
- Anne Schaefer as Mrs. Halevy
- Marcia Harris as Mrs. Gorlick

== Music ==
The film featured a theme song entitled "I Still Believe In You" which was composed by Harry Akst, Grant Clark and Benny Davis.

== Preservation ==
The film is now considered lost.

== See also ==
- List of early sound feature films (1926–1929)
