= Radio broadcasting =

Transmission of radio waves intended to reach a wide audience

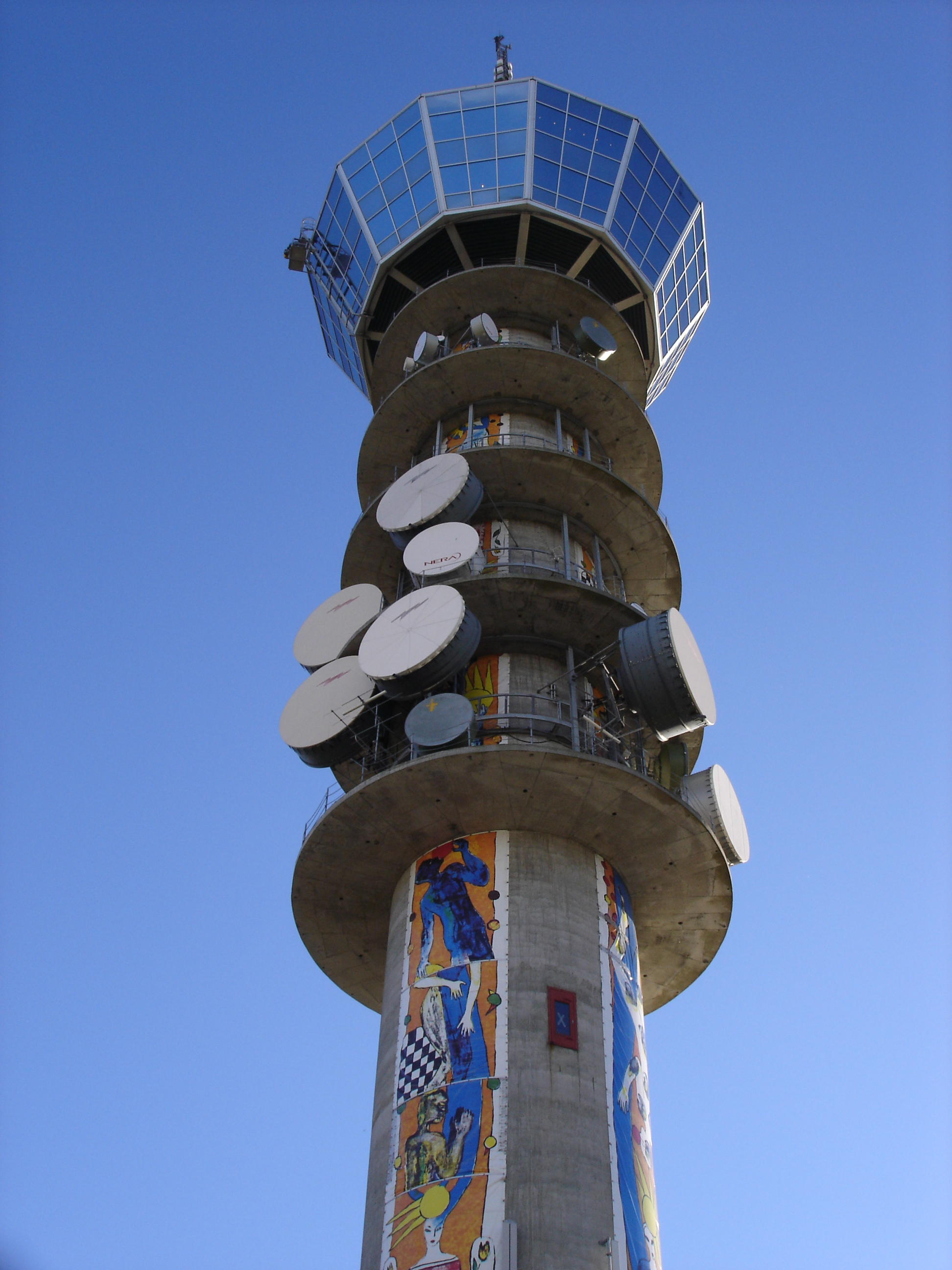
Broadcasting tower in Trondheim, Norway

Radio broadcasting is the transmission of signals, especially audio, to receivers using radio waves over a wide area. Listeners require a broadcast radio receiver to receive these signals. "Terrestrial" broadcasts come from stations on land, and include AM and FM (both analog); and DAB (digital). Audio is also broadcast via satellite in both digital and analog, originating from a satellite in orbit around Earth.

Radio stations may produce their own programming or be affiliated with a radio network that provides content either through broadcast syndication or by simulcasting, or both. The most common transmission technologies are analog and digital. Analog radio uses one of two modulation methods: amplitude modulation (AM) or frequency modulation (FM). Digital radio stations transmit using one of several digital audio standards, such as DAB (Digital Audio Broadcasting), HD Radio, or DRM (Digital Radio Mondiale).

== History ==
=== Pre-radio ===
Electronic distribution originated, to a limited extent, with the invention of the telegraph. The most common example, "tickers", were primarily used to distribute stock price information. An additional subscription service was time signals. The concept of audio broadcasting was first developed after the invention of telephone. In a few locations, most commonly in Europe, telephone newspapers were established, to provide news and entertainment to subscribers. These systems had the advantage of being able to charge individual customers. However, a lack of a way to amplify signals meant that their ranges were generally limited to a single municipality.

Some early inventors foresaw wireless transmission's potential. In 1902, Nathan Stubblefield, who had developed wireless transmissions using ground conduction, envisioned that: "...any one having a receiving instrument, which would consist merely of a telephone receiver and a few feet of wire, and a signaling gong, could, upon being signaled by a transmitting station in Washington, or nearer, if advisable, be informed of weather news. Eventually it will be used for the general transmission of news of every description."

=== Radio ===
Although it was quickly recognized that radio transmissions were capable of being broadcast to a scattered audience without needing connecting wires, there was skepticism about its finances. In an 1898 review of early radio transmissions, then known as "Hertzian telegraphy", a reviewer opined: "As to the practical applications, there were occasions when one wanted to 'shout to the world'—as in distributing political speeches to the Press—and for such a purpose the Hertz-wave and the coherer might be of service. But did not Prof. Lodge forget that no one wants to pay for shouting to the world on a system by which it would be impossible to prevent non-subscribers from benefiting gratuitously?". Another limitation was that many countries required listeners to be licensed in order to operate a radio receiver.

The earliest radio broadcasting stations transmitted radiotelegraphy dots-and-dashes, for such things as time signals and weather reports, or provided news summaries intended for inclusion in shipboard newspapers. This had limited audiences, because of the need to understand Morse code. Beginning in 1904, the U.S. Navy broadcast daily time signals and weather reports, and a Canadian Marconi station in Camperdown, Nova Scotia began transmitting time signals in 1907. In Europe, a station located at the Eiffel Tower in Paris, France, transmitted time signals that were audible throughout the continent. It also transmitted time signals so audiences unfamiliar with Morse code could listen for the "beep" to adjust their clocks and watches. These audiences were international, with evidence of families in London catching the time signal from the Eiffel tower. The weather reports were also a form of entertainment for the audiences of this time.

Although most radio stations during the first two decades of the 1900s employed radiotelegraphic transmissions, there was also experimental development of audio transmissions, mostly using "amplitude modulation" (AM) signals. The first AM technologies included high-frequency spark, alternator, and arc transmitters. However, it was not until the development of vacuum-tube (also known as "valve") transmitters that widespread audio broadcasting became practical. In addition, most early experimenters worked to create radiotelephone systems for private communication, and few were interested in broadcasting information and entertainment to general audiences.

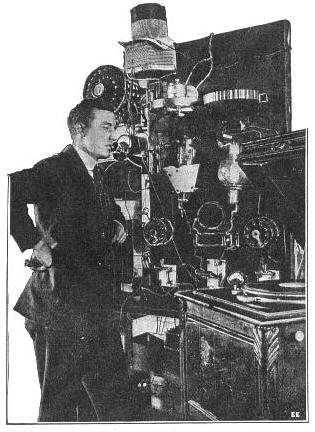
Charles Logwood broadcasting at 2XG in New York City in 1916.

Early examples of audio broadcasts included:

- On 1902, Julio Cervera Baviera was able to make audio transmissions from Xàbia and received in Ibiza.
- On December 21, 1906, Reginald Fessenden successfully demonstrated audio transmissions using an alternator transmitter at Brant Rock, Massachusetts, USA. An article in the December 1932 issue of The Proceedings of the Institute of Radio Engineers by former Fessenden associate Samuel M. Kintner, reviewed information from a January 29, 1932, letter from Fessenden, which reported that shortly after the initial demonstrations, Fessenden had made the first of two radio broadcasts of music and entertainment on the evening of December 24, 1906 (Christmas Eve), using the alternator transmitter. He also stated that a second program was broadcast on December 31 (New Year's Eve). Fessenden claimed that the two programs had been widely publicized in advance, and the Christmas Eve broadcast had been heard "as far down" as Norfolk, Virginia, while the New Year Eve's broadcast had reached listeners in the West Indies. However, despite Fessenden's assertion that these broadcasts were widely heard along the U.S. eastern coast, extensive research has failed to find any contemporary confirmation of these broadcasts.
- Far better documented are the early broadcasts of Lee de Forest, using an arc transmitter. In February 1907, he transmitted electronic telharmonium music from his laboratory station in New York City. This was followed later that year by a series of demonstrations that included Eugenia Farrar singing "I Love You Truly", although the claim that the New York Herald reported this broadcast has not been verified.
- Charles Herrold, who opened the Herrold College of Wireless and Engineering in San Jose, California, USA in 1909, reported that in 1910, using a high-frequency spark transmitter, he had broadcast "wireless phone concerts to local amateur wireless men". He later switched to arc transmitters, and in 1912 reported broadcasting weekly concerts.
- Robert Goldschmidt inaugurated a series of weekly concerts on March 28, 1914, using a high-frequency spark transmitter located at Laeken, Belgium.
- Lee de Forest established experimental station 2XG in the Highbridge section of New York City, which was one of the first to use a vacuum-tube transmitter. The station featured a nightly "wireless newspaper" broadcast. On November 7, 1916, the station, in conjunction with the New York American, broadcast results for the U.S. presidential election.
- George C. Cannon, of New Rochelle, New York, reported making nightly entertainment broadcasts over his Special Amateur station, 2ZK, from December 1916 until the following February.

The outbreak of World War One largely suspended the development of civilian radio. However, during this period major improvements were made in vacuum-tube technology, which went into service after the end of wartime restrictions. All of the following examples used vacuum-tube transmitters:

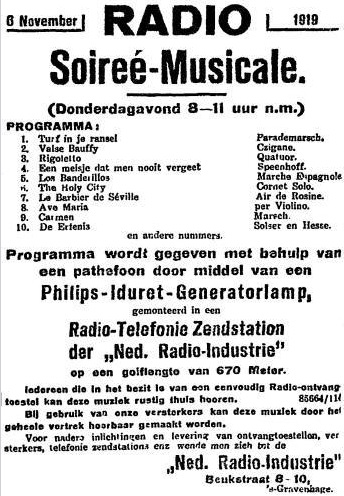
November 5, 1919 Nieuwe Rotterdamsche Courant advertisement, announcing PCGG's debut broadcast scheduled for the next evening, using narrow-band frequency modulation (FM).

- After the wartime restrictions were lifted, Lee de Forest relicenced 2XG, his New York City station, which resumed nightly broadcasts in November 1919. However, this station was shut down after de Forest relocated it without first getting permission. He subsequently moved its transmitter to the California Theater in San Francisco, where it was relicensed and resumed operations as 6XC. In 1921, de Forest described 6XC as the "first radio-telephone station devoted solely" to broadcasting to the public.
- In The Hague, the Netherlands, Hans Idzerda's station, PCGG, started broadcasting on November 6, 1919, using narrow-band frequency modulation (FM), making it arguably the first commercial broadcasting station.
- Radio Argentina began regularly scheduled transmissions in Buenos Aires on August 27, 1920, initially from the Teatro Coliseo, where they broadcast an opera series for 19 days. The station got its license on November 19, 1923. The delay was due to the lack of official Argentine licensing procedures before that date. This station continued regular broadcasting of entertainment, and cultural fare for several decades.
- In early 1919, the Canadian Marconi facility at Montreal, Quebec, Canada received a surplus wartme transmitter, and its test transmissions, over experimental station XWA, evolved into broadcasts, starting with a May 20, 1920 concert. This was followed by weekly broadcasts.
- Entertainment radio broadcasts in the UK began in 1920, with occasional broadcasts by the Marconi Research Centre station, 2MT at Writtle near Chelmsford, England. On June 15, 1920, a widely publicized broadcast was made by soprano Dame Nellie Melba from Marconi's New Street Works factory in Chelmsford. This was the first artist of international renown to make a radio broadcast. However, later that year, the broadcasts were banned by the Post Office, due to complaints that the broadcasts were interfering with military communication.
- Beginning on August 20, 1920, the Detroit News in Detroit, Michigan, USA, began daily broadcasts over what it called the Detroit News Radiophone. This station, later licensed as station WWJ, in 1945 ran an advertisement with the claims that it was the "World's First Station" and where "commercial radio broadcasting began".
- After reviewing multiple post-war experimental efforts in the United States, in the words of Erik Barnouw, "There was a ferment of interest, but without sense of direction—until something happened in Pittsburgh." Frank Conrad was a Westinghouse Electric Corporation electrical engineer. He also held a license for an experimental station, 8XK, located in his garage at his Wilkinsburg, Pennsylvania home. After seeing a local newspaper advertisement for radio receivers capable of picking up the 8XK broadcasts, Westinghouse's Harry P. Davis decided to see if there was a broad consumer market for receivers produced by the company. Westinghouse began regular broadcasts with election returns on the evening of November 2, 1920, over station 8ZZ (later KDKA) located at its East Pittsburgh, Pennsylvania, USA headquarters. This has generally been recognized as the first commercially licensed radio station in the United States.

Effective December 1, 1921, the U.S. Department of Commerce issued regulations formally establishing a broadcasting service, and by the end of 1922, there were over 500 licensed stations. Canada soon followed, and began issuing broadcasting station licenses in April 1922. 2MT in Great Britain began regular entertainment broadcasts in 1922, and that year the British Broadcasting Company was formed and given a national broadcasting monopoly. It received a Royal Charter in 1926, making it the first national broadcaster in the world, followed by Czechoslovak Radio and other European broadcasters in 1923.

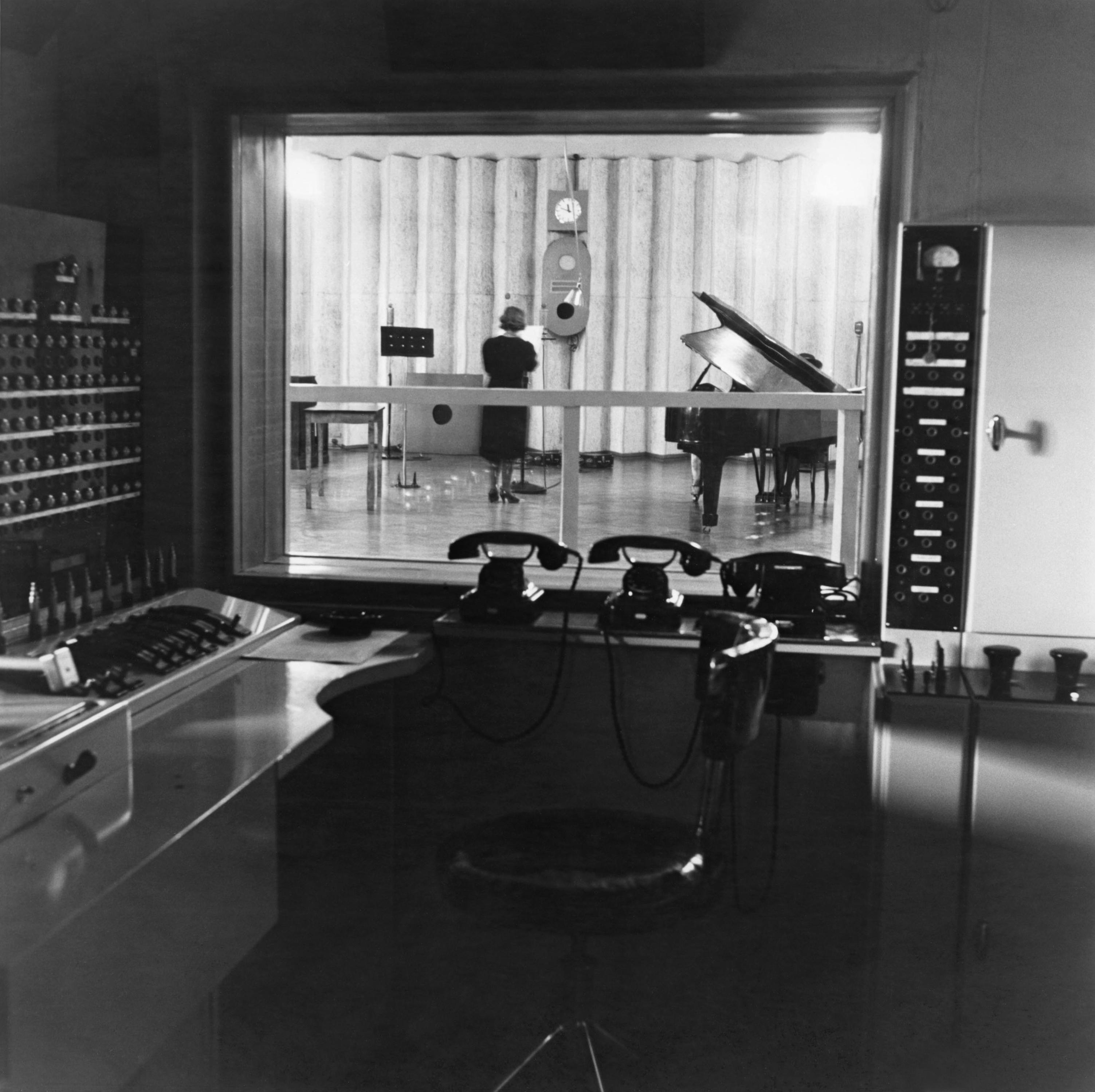
Control room and radio studio of the Finnish broadcasting company Yleisradio (YLE) in the 1930s.

=== Expansion ===
Radio in education soon followed, and colleges across the U.S. began adding radio broadcasting courses to their curricula. Curry College in Milton, Massachusetts, introduced one of the first broadcasting majors in when the college teamed up with WLOE in Boston to have students broadcast programs. By 1931, a majority of U.S. households owned at least one radio receiver.

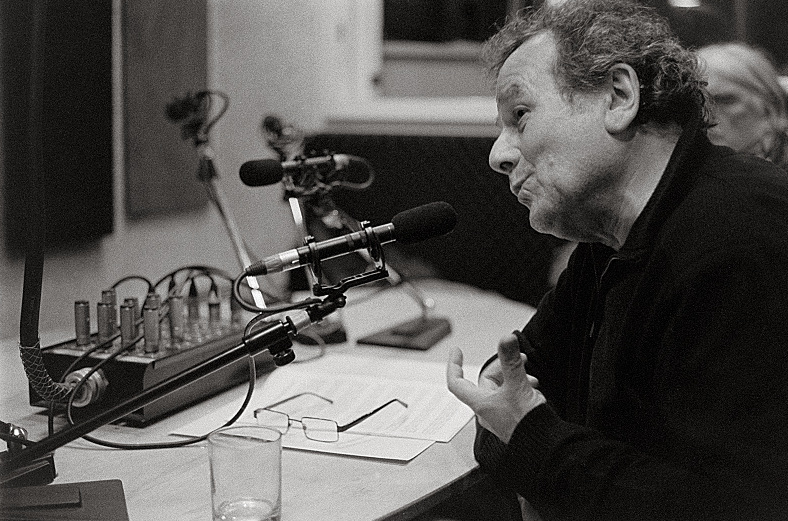
Use of a sound broadcasting station

In line to ITU Radio Regulations (article1.61) each broadcasting station shall be classified by the service in which it operates permanently or temporarily.

== Types ==
Transmission diagram of sound broadcasting (AM and FM)

Broadcasting by radio takes several forms. These include AM and FM stations. There are several subtypes, namely commercial broadcasting, non-commercial educational (NCE) public broadcasting and non-profit varieties as well as community radio, student-run campus radio stations, and hospital radio stations can be found throughout the world. Many stations broadcast on shortwave bands using AM technology that can be received over thousands of miles (especially at night). For example, the BBC, VOA, VOR, and Deutsche Welle have transmitted via shortwave to Africa and Asia. These broadcasts are very sensitive to atmospheric conditions and solar activity.

Nielsen Audio, formerly known as Arbitron, the United States–based company that reports on radio audiences, defines a "radio station" as a government-licensed AM or FM station; an HD Radio (primary or multicast) station; an internet stream of an existing government-licensed station; one of the satellite radio channels from XM Satellite Radio or Sirius Satellite Radio; or, potentially, a station that is not government licensed.

=== AM ===
AM stations were the earliest broadcasting stations to be developed. AM refers to amplitude modulation, a mode of broadcasting radio waves by varying the amplitude of the carrier signal in response to the amplitude of the signal to be transmitted. The medium-wave band is used worldwide for AM broadcasting. Europe also uses the long wave band. In response to the growing popularity of FM stereo radio stations in the late 1980s and early 1990s, some North American stations began broadcasting in AM stereo, though this never gained popularity and very few receivers were ever sold.

The signal is subject to interference from electrical storms (lightning) and other electromagnetic interference (EMI). One advantage of AM radio signal is that it can be detected (turned into sound) with simple equipment. If a signal is strong enough, not even a power source is needed; building an unpowered crystal radio receiver was a common childhood project in the early decades of AM broadcasting.

AM broadcasts occur on North American airwaves in the medium wave frequency range of 525 to 1,705 kHz (known as the "standard broadcast band"). The band was expanded in the 1990s by adding nine channels from 1,605 to 1,705 kHz. Channels are spaced every 10 kHz in the Americas, and generally every 9 kHz everywhere else.

AM transmissions cannot be ionospheric propagated during the day due to strong absorption in the D-layer of the ionosphere. In a crowded channel environment, this means that the power of regional channels which share a frequency must be reduced at night or directionally beamed in order to avoid interference, which reduces the potential nighttime audience. Some stations have frequencies unshared with other stations in North America; these are called clear-channel stations. Many of them can be heard across much of the country at night. During the night, absorption largely disappears and permits signals to travel to much more distant locations via ionospheric reflections. However, fading of the signal can be severe at night.

AM radio transmitters can transmit audio frequencies up to 15 kHz (now limited to 10 kHz in the US due to FCC rules designed to reduce interference), but most receivers are only capable of reproducing frequencies up to 5 kHz or less. At the time that AM broadcasting began in the 1920s, this provided adequate fidelity for existing microphones, 78 rpm recordings, and loudspeakers. The fidelity of sound equipment subsequently improved considerably, but the receivers did not. Reducing the bandwidth of the receivers reduces the cost of manufacturing and makes them less prone to interference. AM stations are never assigned adjacent channels in the same service area. This prevents the sideband power generated by two stations from interfering with each other. Bob Carver created an AM stereo tuner employing notch filtering that demonstrated that an AM broadcast can meet or exceed the 15 kHz baseband bandwidth allotted to FM stations without objectionable interference. After several years, the tuner was discontinued. Bob Carver had left the company and the Carver Corporation later cut the number of models produced before discontinuing production completely.

As well as on the medium wave bands, amplitude modulation (AM) is also used on the shortwave and long wave bands. Shortwave is used largely for national broadcasters, international propaganda, or religious broadcasting organizations. Shortwave transmissions can have international or inter-continental range depending on atmospheric conditions. Long-wave AM broadcasting occurs in Europe, Asia, and Africa. The ground wave propagation at these frequencies is little affected by daily changes in the ionosphere, so broadcasters need not reduce power at night to avoid interference with other transmitters.

=== FM ===
FM refers to frequency modulation, and occurs on VHF airwaves in the frequency range of 88 to 108 MHz everywhere except Japan and Russia. Russia, like the former Soviet Union, uses 65.9 to 74 MHz frequencies in addition to the world standard. Japan uses the 76 to 90 MHz frequency band.

Edwin Howard Armstrong invented wide-band FM radio in the early 1930s to overcome the problem of radio-frequency interference (RFI), which plagued AM radio reception. At the same time, greater fidelity was made possible by spacing stations further apart in the radio frequency spectrum. Instead of 10 kHz apart, as on the AM band in the US, FM channels are 200 kHz (0.2 MHz) apart. In other countries, greater spacing is sometimes mandatory, such as in New Zealand, which uses 700 kHz spacing (previously 800 kHz). The improved fidelity made available was far in advance of the audio equipment of the 1940s, but wide interchannel spacing was chosen to take advantage of the noise-suppressing feature of wideband FM.

Bandwidth of 200 kHz is not needed to accommodate an audio signal — 20 kHz to 30 kHz is all that is necessary for a narrowband FM signal. The 200 kHz bandwidth allowed room for ±75 kHz signal deviation from the assigned frequency, plus guard bands to reduce or eliminate adjacent channel interference. The larger bandwidth allows for broadcasting a 15 kHz bandwidth audio signal plus a 38 kHz stereo "subcarrier"—a piggyback signal that rides on the main signal. Additional unused capacity is used by some broadcasters to transmit utility functions such as background music for public areas, GPS auxiliary signals, or financial market data.

The AM radio problem of interference at night was addressed in a different way. At the time FM was set up, the available frequencies were far higher in the spectrum than those used for AM radio - by a factor of approximately 100. Using these frequencies meant that even at far higher power, the range of a given FM signal was much shorter; thus its market was more local than for AM radio. The reception range at night is the same as in the daytime. All FM broadcast transmissions are line-of-sight, and ionospheric bounce is not viable. The much larger bandwidths, compared to AM and SSB, are more susceptible to phase dispersion. Propagation speeds are fastest in the ionosphere at the lowest sideband frequency. The celerity difference between the highest and lowest sidebands is quite apparent to the listener. Such distortion occurs up to frequencies of approximately 50 MHz. Higher frequencies do not reflect from the ionosphere, nor from storm clouds. Moon reflections have been used in some experiments, but require impractical power levels.

The original FM radio service in the U.S. was the Yankee Network, located in New England. Regular FM broadcasting began in 1939 but did not pose a significant threat to the AM broadcasting industry. It required purchase of a special receiver. The frequencies used, 42 to 50 MHz, were not those used today. The change to the current frequencies, 88 to 108 MHz, began after the end of World War II and was to some extent imposed by AM broadcasters as an attempt to cripple what was by now realized to be a potentially serious threat.

FM radio on the new band had to begin from the ground floor. As a commercial venture, it remained a little-used audio enthusiasts' medium until the 1960s. The more prosperous AM stations, or their owners, acquired FM licenses and often broadcast the same programming on the FM station as on the AM station ("simulcasting"). The FCC limited this practice in the 1960s. By the 1980s, since almost all new radios included both AM and FM tuners, FM became the dominant medium, especially in cities. Because of its greater range, AM remained more common in rural environments.

=== Pirate radio ===
Pirate radio is illegal or non-regulated radio transmission. It is most commonly used to describe illegal broadcasting for entertainment or political purposes. Sometimes it is used for illegal two-way radio operation. Its history can be traced back to the unlicensed nature of the transmission, but historically there has been occasional use of sea vessels—fitting the most common perception of a pirate—as broadcasting bases. Rules and regulations vary largely from country to country, but often the term pirate radio describes the unlicensed broadcast of FM radio, AM radio, or shortwave signals over a wide range. In some places, radio stations are legal where the signal is transmitted, but illegal where the signals are received—especially when the signals cross a national boundary. In other cases, a broadcast may be considered "pirate" due to the type of content, its transmission format, or the transmitting power (wattage) of the station, even if the transmission is not technically illegal (such as a webcast or an amateur radio transmission). Pirate radio stations are sometimes referred to as bootleg radio or clandestine stations.

=== Terrestrial digital radio ===
Digital radio broadcasting has emerged, first in Europe (the UK in 1995 and Germany in 1999), and later in the United States, France, the Netherlands, South Africa, and many other countries worldwide. The simplest system is named DAB Digital Radio, for Digital Audio Broadcasting, and uses the public domain EUREKA 147 (Band III) system. DAB is used mainly in the UK and South Africa. Germany and the Netherlands use the DAB and DAB+ systems, and France uses the L-Band system of DAB Digital Radio.

The broadcasting regulators of the United States and Canada have chosen to use HD radio, an in-band on-channel system that puts digital broadcasts at frequencies adjacent to the analog broadcast. HD Radio is owned by a consortium of private companies that is called iBiquity. An international non-profit consortium Digital Radio Mondiale (DRM), has introduced the public domain DRM system, which is used by a relatively small number of broadcasters worldwide.

== International broadcasting ==
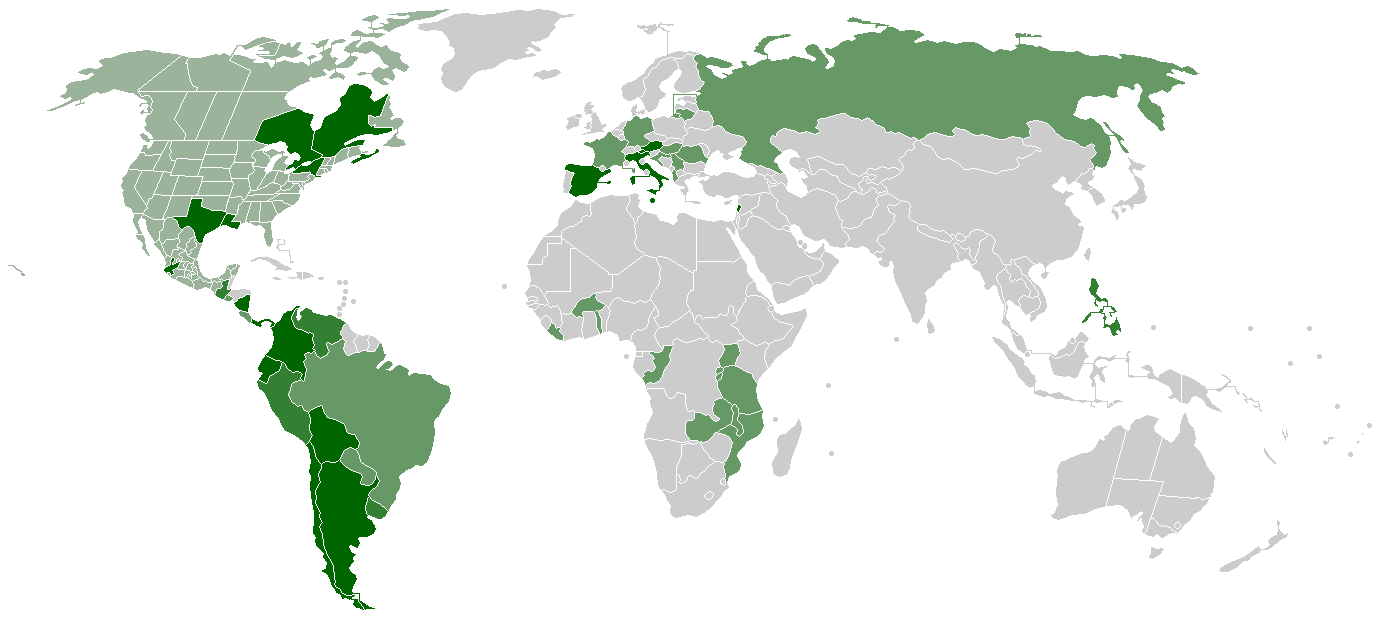
Worldwide presence of Radio Maria broadcasters

Broadcasters in one country have several reasons to reach out to an audience in other countries. Commercial broadcasters may simply see a business opportunity to sell advertising or subscriptions to a broader audience. This is more efficient than broadcasting to a single country, because domestic entertainment programs and information gathered by domestic news staff can be cheaply repackaged for non-domestic audiences.

Governments typically have different motivations for funding international broadcasting. One clear reason is for ideological, or propaganda reasons. Many government-owned stations portray their nation in a positive, non-threatening way. This could be to encourage business investment in or tourism to the nation. Another reason is to combat a negative image produced by other nations or internal dissidents, or insurgents. Radio RSA, the broadcasting arm of the apartheid South African government, is an example of this. A third reason is to promote the ideology of the broadcaster. For example, a program on Radio Moscow from the 1960s to the 1980s was What is Communism?

A second reason is to advance a nation's foreign policy interests and agenda by disseminating its views on international affairs or on the events in particular parts of the world. During the Cold War the American Radio Free Europe and Radio Liberty and Indian Radio AIR were founded to broadcast news from "behind the Iron Curtain" that was otherwise being censored and promote dissent and occasionally, to disseminate disinformation. Currently, the US operates similar services aimed at Cuba (Radio y Televisión Martí) and the People's Republic of China, Vietnam, Laos and North Korea (Radio Free Asia).

Besides ideological reasons, many stations are run by religious broadcasters and are used to provide religious education, religious music, or worship service programs. For example, Vatican Radio, established in 1931, broadcasts such programs. Another station, such as HCJB or Trans World Radio will carry brokered programming from evangelists. In the case of the Broadcasting Services of the Kingdom of Saudi Arabia, both governmental and religious programming is provided.

== Extensions ==
Extensions of traditional radio-wave broadcasting for audio broadcasting in general include cable radio, local wire television networks, DTV radio, satellite radio, and Internet radio via streaming media on the Internet.

=== Satellite ===
The enormous entry costs of space-based satellite transmitters and restrictions on available radio spectrum licenses has restricted growth of Satellite radio broadcasts. In the US and Canada, just two services, XM Satellite Radio and Sirius Satellite Radio exist. Both XM and Sirius are owned by Sirius XM Satellite Radio, which was formed by the merger of XM and Sirius on July 29, 2008, whereas in Canada, XM Radio Canada and Sirius Canada remained separate companies until 2010. Worldspace in Africa and Asia, and MobaHO! in Japan and the ROK were two unsuccessful satellite radio operators which have gone out of business.

== Program formats ==
Radio program formats differ by country, regulation, and markets. For instance, the U.S. Federal Communications Commission designates the 88–92 megahertz band in the U.S. for non-profit or educational programming, with advertising prohibited.

In addition, formats change in popularity as time passes and technology improves. Early radio equipment only allowed program material to be broadcast in real time, known as live broadcasting. As technology for sound recording improved, an increasing proportion of broadcast programming used pre-recorded material. A current trend is the automation of radio stations. Some stations now operate without direct human intervention by using entirely pre-recorded material sequenced by computer control.

== Receiver ==
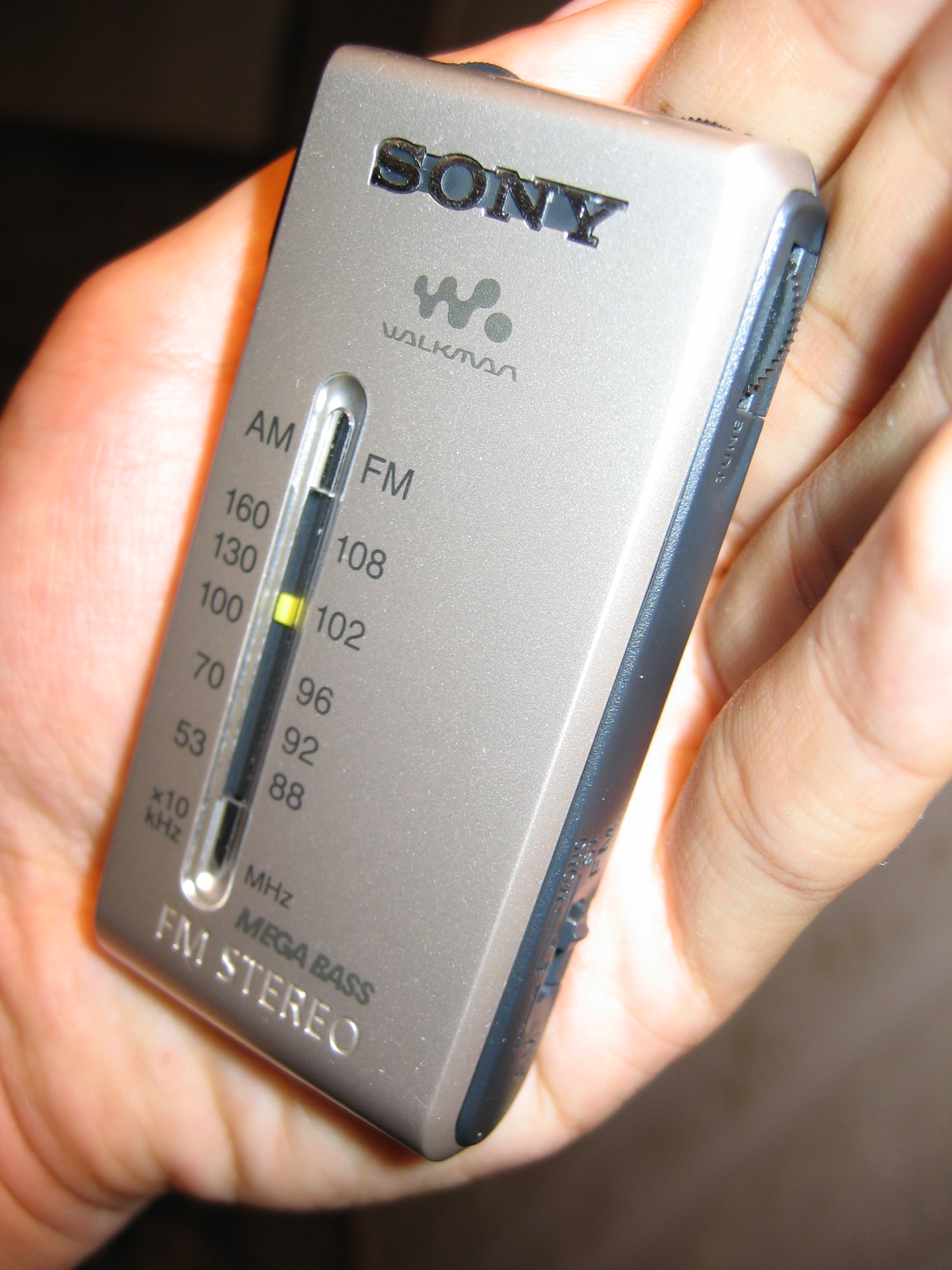
A portable battery-powered AM/FM broadcast receiver, used to listen to audio broadcast by local radio stations.

The most familiar form of radio receiver is a broadcast radio receiver, often just called a broadcast receiver or simply a radio, as used for radio broadcasting. It receives audio programs intended for public reception transmitted by local radio stations. The sound is reproduced either by a loudspeaker in the radio or an earphone which plugs into a jack on the radio. The radio requires electric power, provided either by batteries inside the radio or a power cord which plugs into an electric outlet. All radios have a volume control to adjust the loudness of the audio, and some type of "tuning" control to select the radio station to be received.

== See also ==
- Broadcasting construction permit
- Call sign
- Clandestine radio
- Disc jockey (DJ)
- History of broadcasting
- International broadcasting
- List of radio topics
- Low power radio station
- Podcast
- Radio
- Radio antenna
- Radio network
- Radio personality
- RF modulation
- Sports commentator
- Television station
