= History of radio =

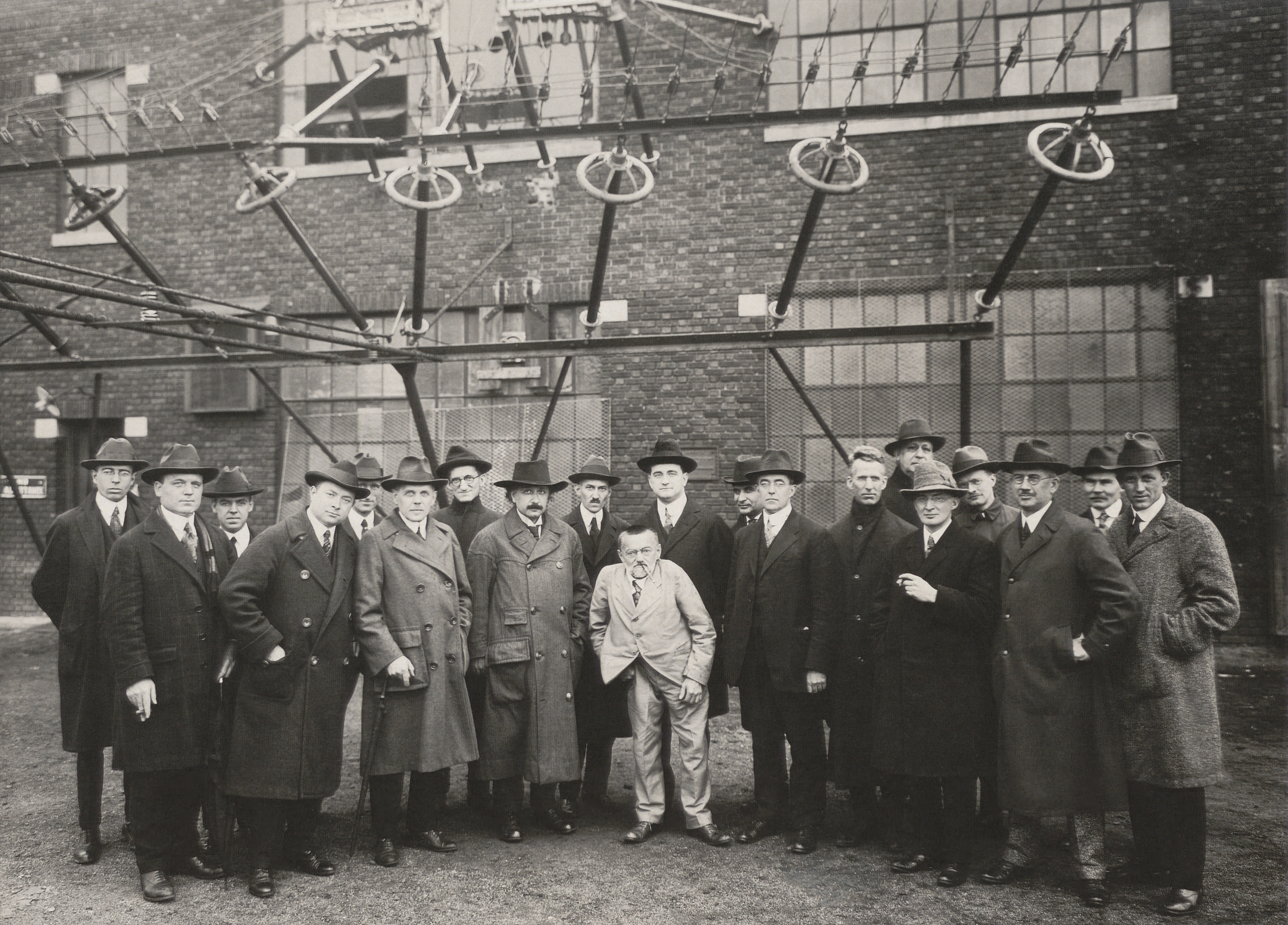
Early pioneers of radio science and technology in the United States, including Charles Steinmetz, David Sarnoff, Irving Langmuir, and Alfred Goldsmith in 1921, photographed next to the antenna feed wires of the New Brunswick Marconi Station, one of the first transatlantic radio links. The photo includes Albert Einstein as a visiting guest.

The history of radio had many contributors, beginning with the scientific discovery of electromagnetic radiation (radio waves) in the late 1800s, followed by technological development of improved devices for producing and receiving transmissions.

Radio was at first employed for "wireless telegraphy", using on-off signaling such as Morse code, initially for private point-to-point communication. The invention in the early 1900s of devices capable of audio transmissions greatly increased its utility, most prominently with the introduction of broadcasting to a widespread, non-technical, audience.

== Discovery ==
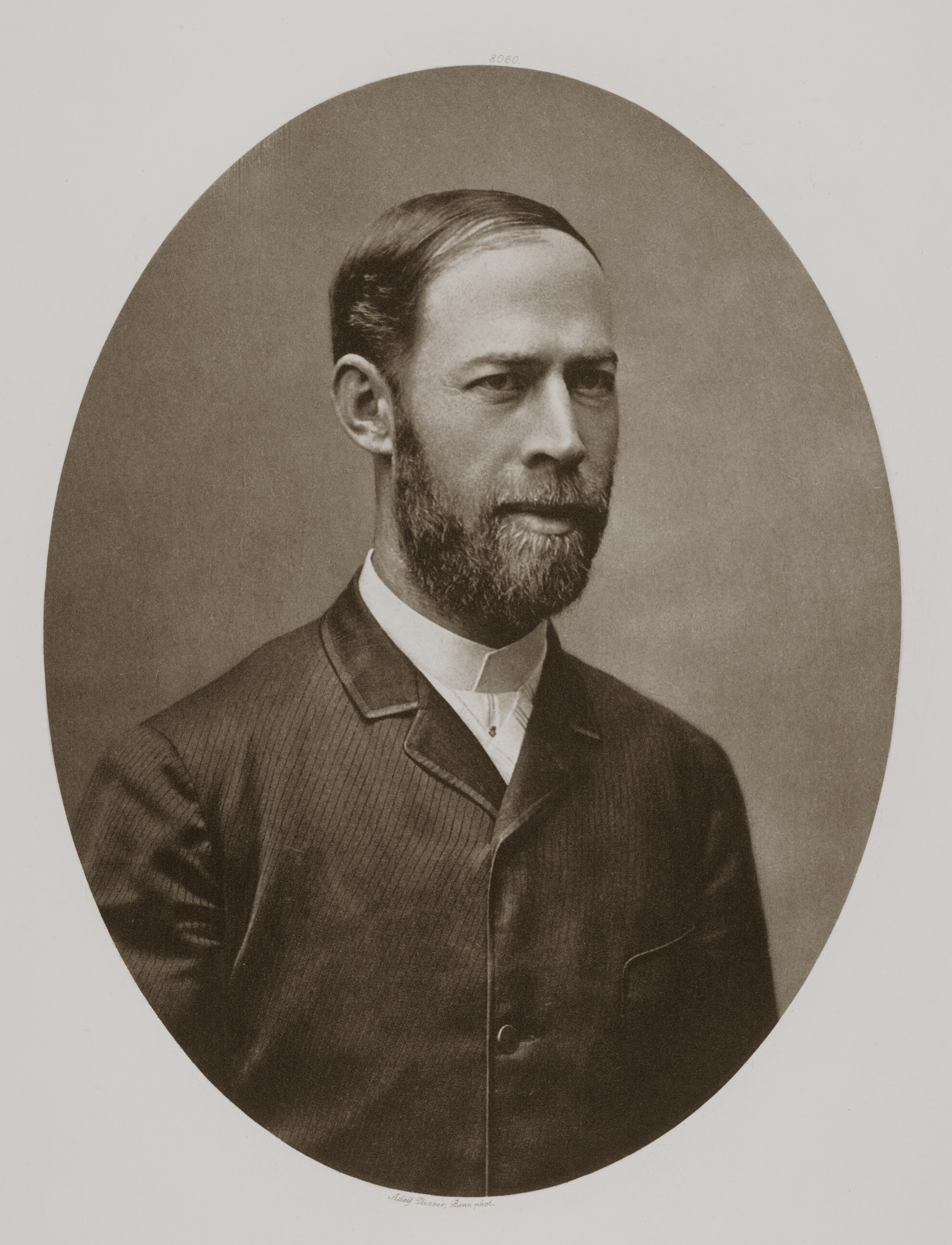
Heinrich Rudolf Hertz (1856–1894) proved the existence of electromagnetic radiation.

In an 1864 presentation, published in 1865, James Clerk Maxwell proposed theories of electromagnetism and mathematical proofs demonstrating that light and radio waves were types of electromagnetic waves propagating through free space.

Between 1886 and 1888, Heinrich Rudolf Hertz published the results of experiments wherein he was able to transmit electromagnetic waves (radio waves) through the air, proving Maxwell's electromagnetic theory.

== Exploration of optical qualities ==
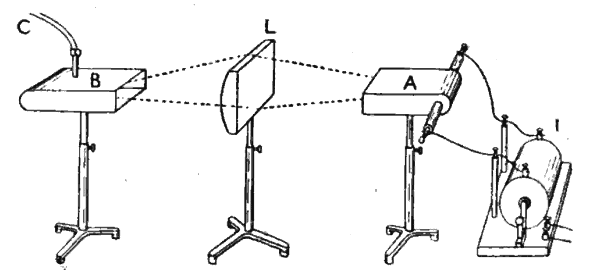
An early experiment demonstrating the refraction of microwaves by a paraffin lens by John Ambrose Fleming in 1897

After their discovery, many scientists and inventors experimented with transmitting and detecting "Hertzian waves" (it would take almost 20 years for the term "radio" to be universally adopted for this type of electromagnetic radiation). Maxwell's theory showing that light and Hertzian electromagnetic waves were the same phenomenon at different wavelengths led "Maxwellian" scientists such as John Perry, Frederick Thomas Trouton and Alexander Trotter to assume they would be analogous to optical light.

Following Hertz's untimely death in 1894, British physicist and writer Oliver Lodge presented a widely covered lecture on Hertzian waves at the Royal Institution on June 1 of the same year. Lodge focused on the optical qualities of the waves and demonstrated how to transmit and detect them (using an improved variation of French physicist Édouard Branly's detector Lodge named the "coherer"). Lodge further expanded on Hertz's experiments showing how these new waves exhibited like light refraction, diffraction, polarization, interference and standing waves, confirming that Hertz' waves and light waves were both forms of Maxwell's electromagnetic waves. During part of the demonstration the waves were sent from the neighboring Clarendon Laboratory building, and received by an apparatus in the lecture theater.

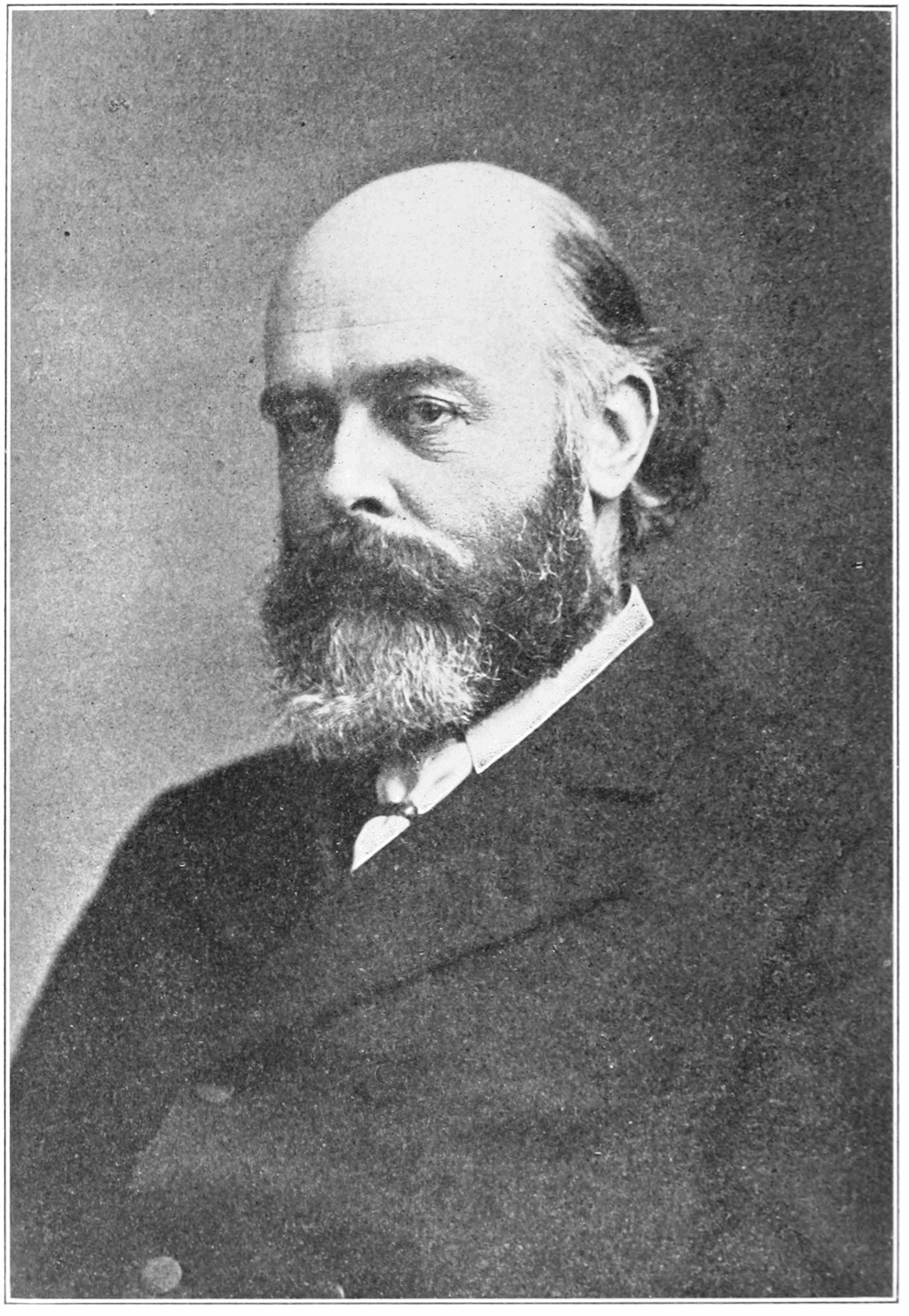
Oliver Lodge's 1894 lectures on Hertz demonstrated how to transmit and detect radio waves.

After Lodge's demonstrations researchers pushed their experiments further down the electromagnetic spectrum towards visible light to further explore the quasioptical nature at these wavelengths. Oliver Lodge and Augusto Righi experimented with 1.5 and 12 GHz microwaves respectively, generated by small metal ball spark resonators. Russian physicist Pyotr Lebedev in 1895 conducted experiments in the 50 GHz (6 millimeter) range. Bengali Indian physicist Jagadish Chandra Bose conducted experiments at wavelengths of 60 GHz (5 millimeter) and invented waveguides, horn antennas, and semiconductor crystal detectors for use in his experiments. He would later write an essay, "Adrisya Alok" ("Invisible Light") on how in November 1895 he conducted a public demonstration at the Town Hall of Kolkata, India using millimeter-range-wavelength microwaves to trigger detectors that ignited gunpowder and rang a bell at a distance.

== Proposed applications ==
Between 1890 and 1892 physicists such as John Perry, Frederick Thomas Trouton and William Crookes proposed electromagnetic or Hertzian waves as a navigation aid or means of communication, with Crookes writing on the possibilities of wireless telegraphy based on Hertzian waves in 1892. Among physicists, what were perceived as technical limitations to using these new waves, such as delicate equipment, the need for large amounts of power to transmit over limited ranges, and their similarity to already existing optical light transmitting devices, led them to a belief that applications were very limited. The Serbian American engineer Nikola Tesla considered Hertzian waves relatively useless for long range transmission since "light" could not transmit further than the line of sight. There was speculation that this fog and stormy weather penetrating "invisible light" could be used in maritime applications such as lighthouses. The London journal The Electrician (December 1895) commented on Bose's achievements, saying "we may in time see the whole system of coast lighting throughout the navigable world revolutionized by an Indian Bengali scientist working single-handedly in our Presidency College Laboratory."

In 1895, adapting the techniques presented in Lodge's published lectures, Russian physicist Alexander Stepanovich Popov built a lightning detector that used a coherer-based radio receiver. He presented it to the Russian Physical and Chemical Society on May 7, 1895, known as Radio Day in Russia.

== Marconi and radio telegraphy ==
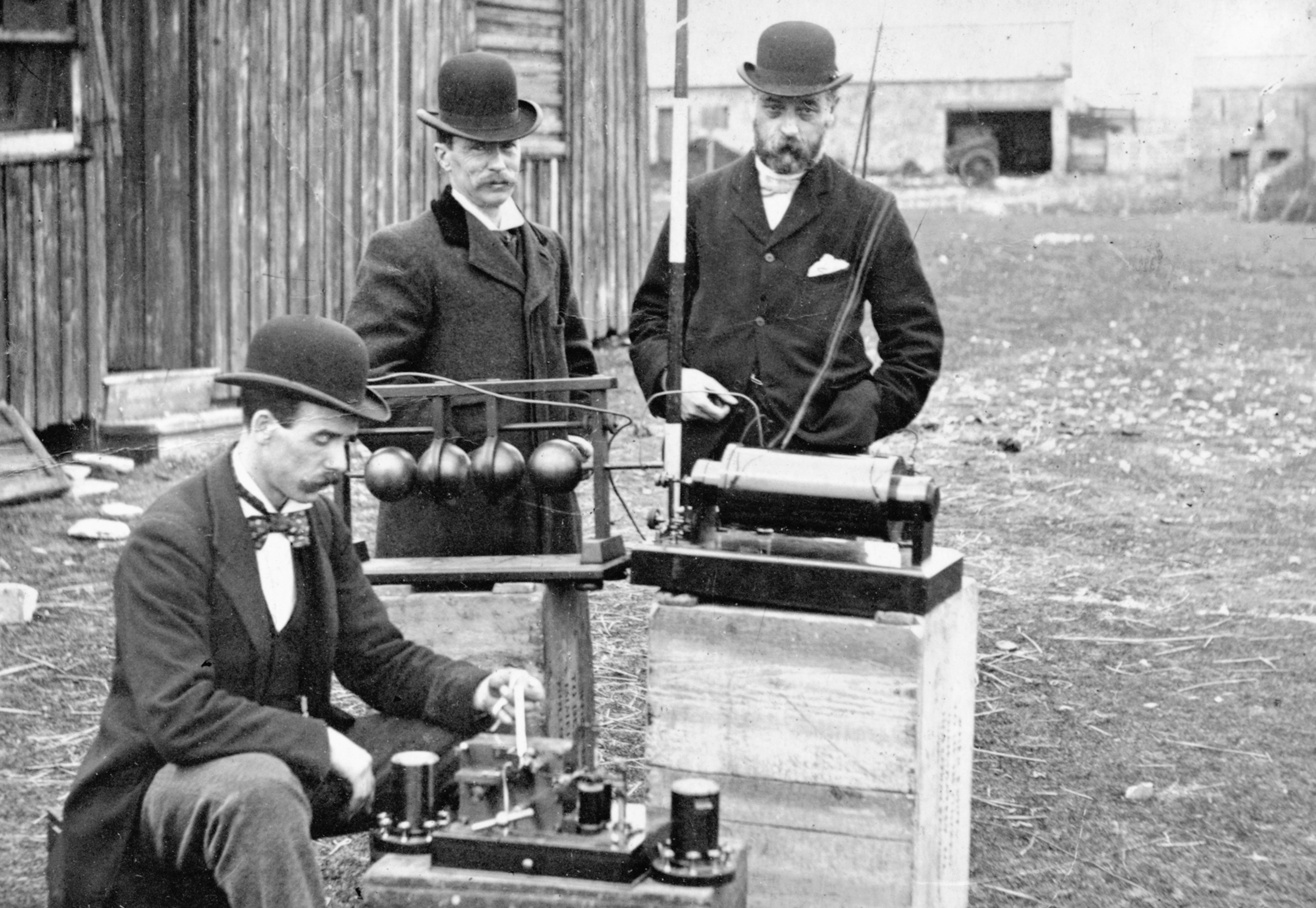
British Post Office engineers inspect Guglielmo Marconi's wireless telegraphy (radio) equipment in 1897.

In 1894, the young Italian inventor Guglielmo Marconi began working on the idea of building long-distance wireless transmission systems based on the use of Hertzian waves (radio waves), a line of inquiry that he noted other inventors did not seem to be pursuing. Marconi read through the literature and used the ideas of others who were experimenting with radio waves but did a great deal to develop devices such as portable transmitters and receiver systems that could work over long distances, turning what was essentially a laboratory experiment into a useful communication system. By August 1895, Marconi was field testing his system but even with improvements he was only able to transmit signals up to one-half mile, a distance Oliver Lodge had predicted in 1894 as the maximum transmission distance for radio waves. Marconi raised the height of his antenna and hit upon the idea of grounding his transmitter and receiver. With these improvements the system was capable of transmitting signals up to 2 miles (3.2 km) and over hills. This apparatus proved to be the first engineering-complete, commercially successful radio transmission system and Marconi went on to file British patent GB189612039A, Improvements in transmitting electrical impulses and signals and in apparatus there-for, in 1896. This patent was granted in the UK on 2 July 1897.

=== Nautical and transatlantic transmissions ===
In 1897, Marconi established a radio station on the Isle of Wight, England and opened his "wireless" factory in the former silk-works at Hall Street, Chelmsford, England, in 1898, employing around 60 people.

On 12 December 1901, using a 500-foot (150 m) kite-supported antenna for reception—signals transmitted by the company's new high-power station at Poldhu, Cornwall, Marconi transmitted a message across the Atlantic Ocean to Signal Hill in St. John's, Newfoundland.

Marconi began to build high-powered stations on both sides of the Atlantic to communicate with ships at sea. In 1904, he established a commercial service to transmit nightly news summaries to subscribing ships, which could incorporate them into their on-board newspapers. A regular transatlantic radio-telegraph service was finally begun on 17 October 1907 between Clifden, Ireland, and Glace Bay, but even after this the company struggled for many years to provide reliable communication to others.

Marconi's apparatus is also credited with saving the 700 people who survived the tragic Titanic disaster.

== Audio transmission ==
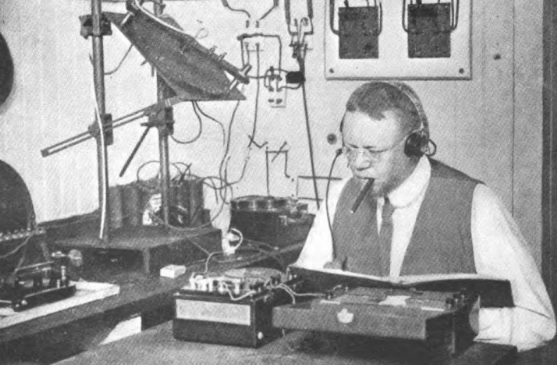
Fessenden operating an underwater oscillator in 1915.

In the late 1890s, Canadian-American inventor Reginald Fessenden came to the conclusion that he could develop a far more efficient system than the spark-gap transmitter and coherer receiver combination. To this end he worked on developing a high-speed alternator (referred to as "an alternating-current dynamo") that generated "pure sine waves" and produced "a continuous train of radiant waves of substantially uniform strength", or, in modern terminology, a continuous-wave (CW) transmitter. While working for the United States Weather Bureau on Cobb Island, Maryland, Fessenden researched using this setup for audio transmissions via radio. By the fall of 1900, he successfully transmitted speech over a distance of about 1.6 kilometers (one mile), which appears to have been the first successful audio transmission using radio signals. Although successful, the sound transmitted was far too distorted to be commercially practical. In 1904, Austrian physicist Otto Nußbaumer was the first to transmit music wirelessly at Albert von Ettingshausen’s university lab in Graz. The devices used are today part of the Vienna Museum of Science and Technology collection. According to some sources, notably Fessenden's wife Helen's biography, on Christmas Eve 1906, Reginald Fessenden used an Alexanderson alternator and rotary spark-gap transmitter to make the first radio audio broadcast, from Brant Rock, Massachusetts. Ships at sea heard a broadcast that included Fessenden playing O Holy Night on the violin and reading a passage from the Bible.

Around the same time American inventor Lee de Forest experimented with an arc transmitter, which unlike the discontinuous pulses produced by spark transmitters, created a steady "continuous wave" signal that could be used for amplitude modulated (AM) audio transmissions. In February 1907 he transmitted electronic telharmonium music from his laboratory station in New York City. This was followed by tests that included, in the fall, Eugenia Farrar singing "I Love You Truly". In July 1907 he made ship-to-shore transmissions by radiotelephone—race reports for the Annual Inter-Lakes Yachting Association (I-LYA) Regatta held on Lake Erie—which were sent from the steam yacht Thelma to his assistant, Frank E. Butler, located in the Fox's Dock Pavilion on South Bass Island.

=== Broadcasting ===
The Dutch company Nederlandsche Radio-Industrie and its owner-engineer, Hanso Idzerda, made its first regular entertainment radio broadcast over station PCGG from its workshop in The Hague on 6 November 1919. The company manufactured both transmitters and receivers. Its popular program was broadcast four nights per week using narrow-band FM transmissions on 670 metres (448 kHz), until 1924 when the company ran into financial trouble.

Regular entertainment broadcasts began in Argentina, pioneered by Enrique Telémaco Susini and his associates. At 9 pm on August 27, 1920, Sociedad Radio Argentina aired a live performance of Richard Wagner's opera Parsifal from the Coliseo Theater in downtown Buenos Aires. Only about twenty homes in the city had receivers to tune in to this program.

On 31 August 1920 the Detroit News began publicized daily news and entertainment "Detroit News Radiophone" broadcasts, originally as licensed amateur station 8MK, then later as WBL and WWJ in Detroit, Michigan.

Union College in Schenectady, New York began broadcasting on October 14, 1920, over 2ADD, an amateur station licensed to Wendell King, an African-American student at the school. Broadcasts included a series of Thursday night concerts initially heard within a 100-mile (160 km) radius and later for a 1,000-mile (1,600 km) radius.

In 1922 regular audio broadcasts for entertainment began in the UK from the Marconi Research Centre 2MT at Writtle near Chelmsford, England.

==== Wavelength and frequency ====
In early radio, and to a limited extent much later, the transmission signal of the radio station was specified in meters, referring to the wavelength, the length of the radio wave. This is the origin of the terms long wave, medium wave, and short wave radio. Portions of the radio spectrum reserved for specific purposes were often referred to by wavelength: the 40-meter band, used for amateur radio, for example. The relation between wavelength and frequency is reciprocal: the higher the frequency, the shorter the wave, and vice versa.

As equipment progressed, precise frequency control became possible; early stations often did not have a precise frequency, as it was affected by the temperature of the equipment, among other factors. Identifying a radio signal by its frequency rather than its length proved much more practical and useful, and starting in the 1920s this became the usual method of identifying a signal, especially in the United States. Frequencies specified in number of cycles per second (kilocycles, megacycles) were replaced by the more specific designation of hertz (cycles per second) about 1965.

== Radio companies ==
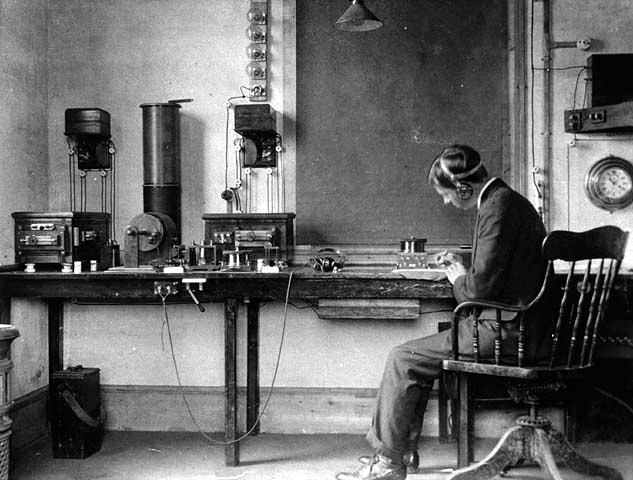
Donald Manson working as an employee of the Marconi Company (England, 1906)

=== British Marconi ===
Using various patents, the British Marconi company was established in 1897 by Guglielmo Marconi and began communication between coast radio stations and ships at sea. A year after, in 1898, they successfully introduced their first radio station in Chelmsford. This company, along with its subsidiaries Canadian Marconi and American Marconi, had a stranglehold on ship-to-shore communication. It operated much the way American Telephone and Telegraph operated until 1983, owning all of its equipment and refusing to communicate with non-Marconi equipped ships. Many inventions improved the quality of radio, and amateurs experimented with the uses of radio, thus planting the first seeds of broadcasting.

=== Telefunken ===
The company Telefunken was founded on May 27, 1903, as "Telefunken society for wireless telefon" of Siemens & Halske (S & H) and the Allgemeine Elektrizitäts-Gesellschaft (General Electricity Company) as joint undertakings for radio engineering in Berlin. It continued as a joint venture of AEG and Siemens, until Siemens left in 1941. In 1911, Kaiser Wilhelm II sent Telefunken engineers to West Sayville, New York to erect three 600-foot (180-m) radio towers there. Nikola Tesla assisted in the construction. A similar station was erected in Nauen, creating the only wireless communication between North America and Europe.

== Technological development ==
=== Bandwidth ===
Spark gap transmitters emitted broadband signals, typically as wide as 30 kHz to 30 MHz in 1900. A CW signal keyed with Morse code occupies about 40 Hz at 10 words per minute. AM broadcast in the US are spaced at 10 kHz.

=== Amplitude-modulated (AM) ===
Inventions of the triode amplifier, motor–generator, and detector enabled audio radio. Reginald Fessenden, Valdemar Poulsen and Lee de Forest pioneered the use of amplitude modulation (AM), by which soundwaves can be transmitted over a continuous-wave radio signal of narrow bandwidth. This was a major improvement over spark-gap radio, which sent rapid strings of damped-wave pulses that consumed much bandwidth and were only suitable for Morse-code telegraphy.

=== Crystal set receivers ===
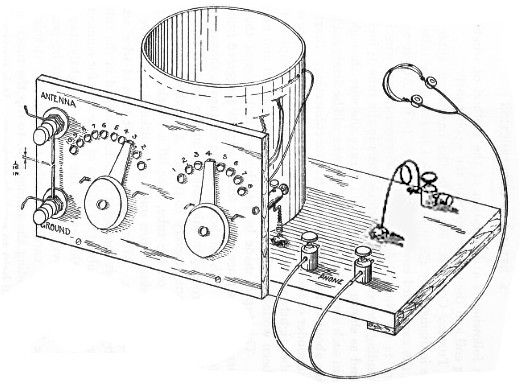
In the 1920s, the United States government publication, "Construction and Operation of a Simple Homemade Radio Receiving Outfit", showed how almost any person handy with simple tools could build an effective crystal radio receiver.

The most common type of receiver before vacuum tubes was the crystal set, although some early radios used some type of amplification through electric current or battery. During the 1920s radio engineers analyzed crystal detectors in the technical literature. Articles in ''Experimental Wireless & Wireless Engineer'' measured and plotted the nonlinear current-voltage characteristics of galena and other mineral contacts and explained how this rectifying behavior allowed crystal sets to convert radio-frequency signals into detectable audio currents.

The art and science of crystal sets is still pursued as a hobby in the form of simple un-amplified radios that 'runs on nothing, forever'. They are used as a teaching tool by groups such as the Boy Scouts of America to introduce youngsters to electronics and radio. As the only energy available is that gathered by the antenna system, loudness is necessarily limited.

=== Vacuum tubes ===
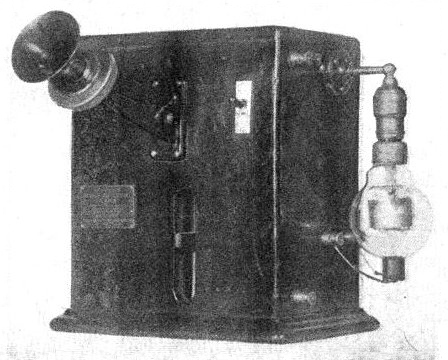
The first commercial AM Audion vacuum tube radio transmitter, built in 1914 by Lee De Forest who invented the Audion (triode) in 1906

During the mid-1920s, amplifying vacuum tubes revolutionized radio receivers and transmitters. John Ambrose Fleming developed a vacuum tube diode. Lee de Forest placed a screen, added a "grid" electrode, creating the triode.

Early radios ran the entire power of the transmitter through a carbon microphone. In the 1920s, the Westinghouse company bought Lee de Forest's and Edwin Armstrong's patents. During the mid-1920s, Amplifying vacuum tubes revolutionized radio receivers and transmitters. Westinghouse engineers developed a more modern vacuum tube.

The first radios still required batteries, but in 1926 the "battery eliminator" was introduced to the market. This tube technology allowed radios to be powered through the grid instead. They still required batteries to heat up the vacuum-tube filaments, but after the invention of indirectly heated vacuum tubes, the first completely battery free radios became available in 1927.

In 1929 a new screen grid tube called UY-224 was introduced, an amplifier designed to operate directly on alternating current.

A problem with the early radios was fading stations and fluctuating volume. The invention of the superheterodyne receiver solved this problem, and the first radios with a heterodyne radio receiver went on sale in 1924. But it was costly, and the technology was shelved while waiting for the technology to mature, and in 1929 the Radiola 66 and Radiola 67 went on sale.

==== Patents and licensing ====
The development of early radio technology was closely linked to patents, licensing agreements, and corporate patent pools that influenced which companies could manufacture receivers and transmitters. Key inventions such as the triode, regenerative receiver, and superheterodyne receiver became the subject of extensive litigation and cross-licensing agreements among companies including RCA, General Electric, Westinghouse, and AT&T.

=== Loudspeakers ===
In the early days one had to use headphones to listen to radio. Later loudspeakers in the form of a horn of the type used by phonographs, equipped with a telephone receiver, became available. But the sound quality was poor. In 1926 the first radios with electrodynamic loudspeakers went on sale, which improved the quality significantly. At first the loudspeakers were separated from the radio, but soon radios would come with a built-in loudspeaker.

Other inventions related to sound included the automatic volume control (AVC), first commercially available in 1928. In 1930 a tone control knob was added to the radios. This allowed listeners to improve imperfect broadcasting.

The magnetic cartridge, which was introduced in the mid 20's, greatly improved the broadcasting of music. When playing music from a phonograph before the magnetic cartridge, a microphone had to be placed close to a horn loudspeaker. The invention allowed the electric signals to be amplified and then fed directly to the broadcast transmitter.

=== Transistor technology ===
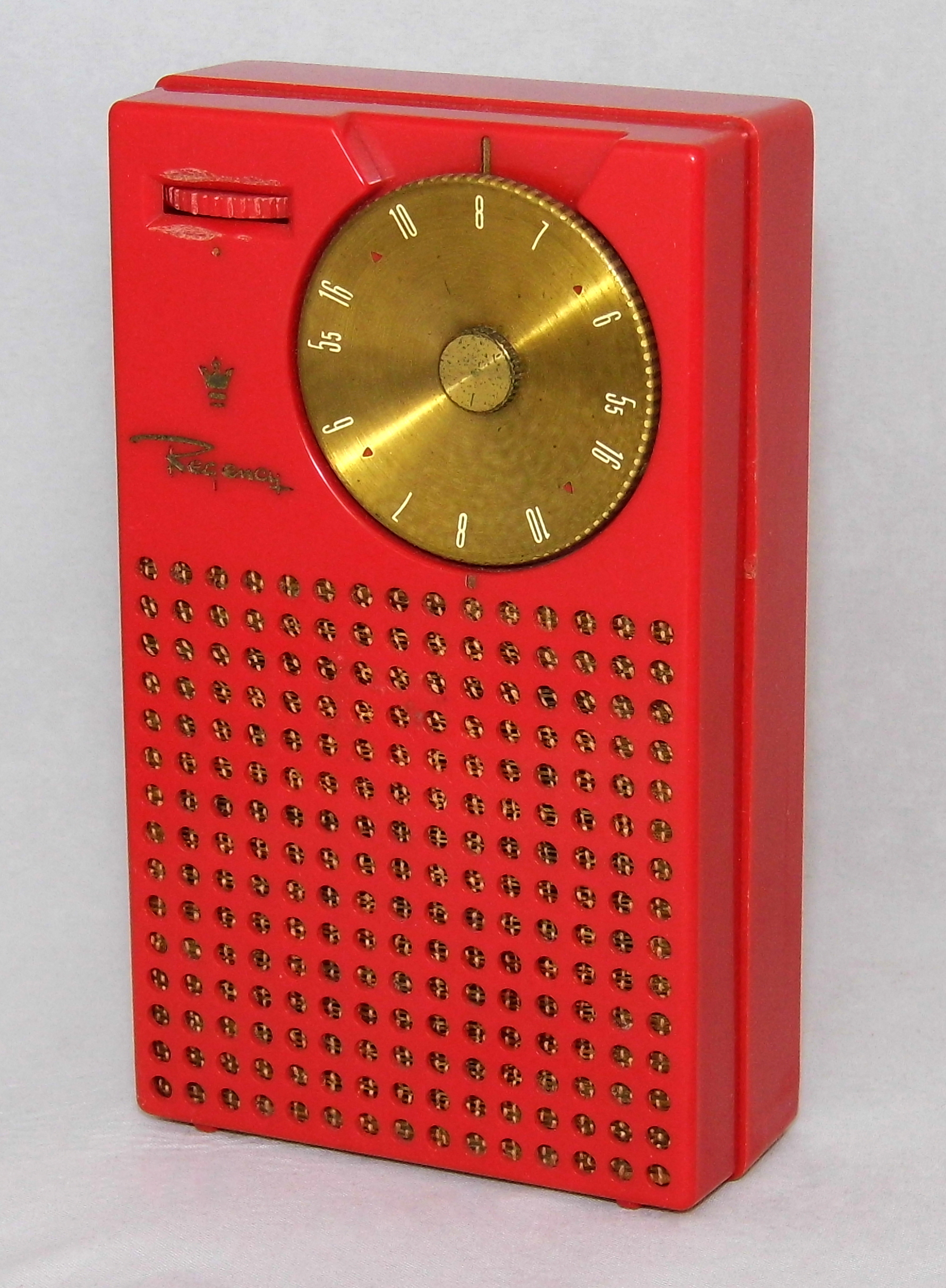
The Regency TR-1, which used Texas Instruments' NPN transistors, was the world's first commercially produced transistor radio in 1954. Size: 3×5×1.25 inch (7.6×12.7×3.2 cm)

Following development of transistor technology, bipolar junction transistors led to the development of the transistor radio. In 1954, the Regency company introduced a pocket transistor radio, the TR-1, powered by a "standard 22.5 V Battery." In 1955, the newly formed Sony company introduced its first transistorized radio, the TR-55. It was small enough to fit in a vest pocket, powered by a small battery. It was durable, because it had no vacuum tubes to burn out. In 1957, Sony introduced the TR-63, the first mass-produced transistor radio, leading to the mass-market penetration of transistor radios. Over the next 20 years, transistors replaced tubes almost completely except for high-power transmitters.

By the mid-1960s, the Radio Corporation of America (RCA) were using metal–oxide–semiconductor field-effect transistors (MOSFETs) in their consumer products, including FM radio, television and amplifiers. Metal–oxide–semiconductor (MOS) large-scale integration (LSI) provided a practical and economic solution for radio technology, and was used in mobile radio systems by the early 1970s.

=== Integrated circuit ===
The first integrated circuit (IC) radio, P1740 by General Electric, became available in 1966.

=== Car radio ===
The first car radio was introduced in 1922, but it was so large that it took up too much space in the car. The first commercial car radio that could easily be installed in most cars went on sale in 1930.

== Radio telex ==
Telegraphy did not go away on radio. Instead, the degree of automation increased. On land-lines in the 1930s, teletypewriters automated encoding, and were adapted to pulse-code dialing to automate routing, a service called telex. For thirty years, telex was the cheapest form of long-distance communication, because up to 25 telex channels could occupy the same bandwidth as one voice channel. For business and government, it was an advantage that telex directly produced written documents.

Telex systems were adapted to short-wave radio by sending tones over single sideband. CCITT R.44 (the most advanced pure-telex standard) incorporated character-level error detection and retransmission as well as automated encoding and routing. For many years, telex-on-radio (TOR) was the only reliable way to reach some third-world countries. TOR remains reliable, though less-expensive forms of e-mail are displacing it. Many national telecom companies historically ran nearly pure telex networks for their governments, and they ran many of these links over short wave radio.

Documents including maps and photographs went by radiofax, or wireless photoradiogram, invented in 1924 by Richard H. Ranger of Radio Corporation of America (RCA). This method prospered in the mid-20th century and faded late in the century.

== Radio navigation ==
One of the first developments in the early 20th century was that aircraft used commercial AM radio stations for navigation, AM stations are still marked on U.S. aviation charts. Radio navigation played an important role during war time, especially in World War II. Before the discovery of the crystal oscillator, radio navigation had many limits. However, as radio technology expanded, navigation became easier to use, and provided better position information. Although there are many advantages, the radio navigation systems often comes with complex equipment such as the radio compass receiver, compass indicator, or the radar plan position indicator. All of these require users to obtain certain knowledge.

In the 1960s VOR systems became widespread. In the 1970s, LORAN became the premier radio navigation system. Soon, the US Navy experimented with satellite navigation. In 1987, the Global Positioning System (GPS) constellation of satellites was launched; it was followed by other GNSS systems like Glonass, BeiDou and Galileo.

== FM ==
In 1933, FM radio was patented by inventor Edwin H. Armstrong. FM uses frequency modulation of the radio wave to reduce static and interference from electrical equipment and the atmosphere. In 1937, W1XOJ, the first experimental FM radio station after Armstrong's W2XMN in Alpine, New Jersey, was granted a construction permit by the US Federal Communications Commission (FCC).

=== FM in Europe ===
After World War II, FM radio broadcasting was introduced in Germany. At a meeting in Copenhagen in 1948, a new wavelength plan was set up for Europe. Because of the recent war, Germany (which did not exist as a state and so was not invited) was only given a small number of medium-wave frequencies, which were not very good for broadcasting. For this reason Germany began broadcasting on UKW ("Ultrakurzwelle", i.e. ultra short wave, nowadays called VHF) which was not covered by the Copenhagen plan. After some amplitude modulation experience with VHF, it was realized that FM radio was a much better alternative for VHF radio than AM. Because of this history, FM radio is still referred to as "UKW Radio" in Germany. Other European nations followed a bit later, when the superior sound quality of FM and the ability to run many more local stations because of the more limited range of VHF broadcasts were realized.

== Television ==
In the 1930s, regular analog television broadcasting began in some parts of Europe and North America. By the end of the decade there were roughly 25,000 all-electronic television receivers in existence worldwide, the majority of them in the UK. In the US, Armstrong's FM system was designated by the FCC to transmit and receive television sound.

=== Color television ===
- 1953: NTSC compatible color television introduced in the US.
- 1962: Telstar 1, the first communications satellite, relayed the first publicly available live transatlantic television signal.
- Mid-1960s: Metal–oxide–semiconductor field-effect transistor (MOSFET) first used for television, by the Radio Corporation of America (RCA). The power MOSFET was later widely adopted for television receiver circuits.

By 1963, color television was being broadcast commercially (though not all broadcasts or programs were in color), and the first (radio) communication satellite, Telstar, was launched. In the 1970s,

== Mobile phones ==
In 1947 AT&T commercialized the Mobile Telephone Service. From its start in St. Louis in 1946, AT&T then introduced Mobile Telephone Service to one hundred towns and highway corridors by 1948. Mobile Telephone Service was a rarity with only 5,000 customers placing about 30,000 calls each week. Because only three radio channels were available, only three customers in any given city could make mobile telephone calls at one time. Mobile Telephone Service was expensive, costing US$15 per month, plus $0.30–0.40 per local call, equivalent to (in 2012 US dollars) about $176 per month and $3.50–4.75 per call.

The development of metal–oxide–semiconductor (MOS) large-scale integration (LSI) technology, information theory and cellular networking led to the development of affordable mobile communications. The Advanced Mobile Phone System analog mobile phone system, developed by Bell Labs, was introduced in the Americas in 1978, gave much more capacity. It was the primary analog mobile phone system in North America (and other locales) through the 1980s and into the 2000s.

== Broadcast and copyright ==
The British government and the state-owned postal services found themselves under massive pressure from the wireless industry (including telegraphy) and early radio adopters to open up to the new medium. In an internal confidential report from February 25, 1924, the Imperial Wireless Telegraphy Committee stated:

"We have been asked 'to consider and advise on the policy to be adopted as regards the Imperial Wireless Services so as to protect and facilitate public interest.' It was impressed upon us that the question was urgent. We did not feel called upon to explore the past or to comment on the delays which have occurred in the building of the Empire Wireless Chain. We concentrated our attention on essential matters, examining and considering the facts and circumstances which have a direct bearing on policy and the condition which safeguard public interests."

When radio was introduced in the early 1920s, many predicted it would kill the phonograph record industry. Radio was a free medium for the public to hear music for which they would normally pay. While some companies saw radio as a new avenue for promotion, others feared it would cut into profits from record sales and live performances. Many record companies would not license their records to be played over the radio, and had their major stars sign agreements that they would not perform on radio broadcasts.

Indeed, the music recording industry had a severe drop in profits after the introduction of the radio. For a while, it appeared as though radio was a definite threat to the record industry. Radio ownership grew from two out of five homes in 1931 to four out of five homes in 1938. Meanwhile, record sales fell from $75 million in 1929 to $26 million in 1938 (with a low point of $5 million in 1933), though the economics of the situation were also affected by the Great Depression.

The copyright owners were concerned that they would see no gain from the popularity of radio and the 'free' music it provided. What they needed to make this new medium work for them already existed in previous copyright law. The copyright holder for a song had control over all public performances 'for profit.' The problem now was proving that the radio industry, which was just figuring out for itself how to make money from advertising and currently offered free music to anyone with a receiver, was making a profit from the songs.

The test case was against Bamberger's Department Store in Newark, New Jersey in 1922. The store was broadcasting music from its store on the radio station WOR. No advertisements were heard, except at the beginning of the broadcast which announced "L. Bamberger and Co., One of America's Great Stores, Newark, New Jersey." It was determined through this and previous cases (such as the lawsuit against Shanley's Restaurant) that Bamberger was using the songs for commercial gain, thus making it a public performance for profit, which meant the copyright owners were due payment.

With this ruling the American Society of Composers, Authors and Publishers (ASCAP) began collecting licensing fees from radio stations in 1923. The beginning sum was $250 for all music protected under ASCAP, but for larger stations the price soon ballooned to $5,000. Edward Samuels reports in his book The Illustrated Story of Copyright that "radio and TV licensing represents the single greatest source of revenue for ASCAP and its composers [...] and [a]n average member of ASCAP gets about $150–$200 per work per year, or about $5,000-$6,000 for all of a member's compositions." Not long after the Bamberger ruling, ASCAP had to once again defend their right to charge fees, in 1924. The Dill Radio Bill would have allowed radio stations to play music without paying and licensing fees to ASCAP or any other music-licensing corporations. The bill did not pass.

== Regulations of radio stations in the U.S. ==
=== Wireless Ship Act of 1910 ===
One of the first practical uses of radio was for communication to and from ships. To enhance safety, the Wireless Ship Act of 1910 marked the first time the U.S. government imposed regulations on radio communication. This act required ships departing U.S. ports to have a radio system with a professional operator if they travel more than 200 miles offshore or have more than 50 people on board. The act was flawed: it did not establish the priority of distress calls from sea or assign radio frequencies to avoid interference. Competition still occurred between radio operators, especially those of the two major companies, British and American Marconi, leading to delay of communication for ships that used a competitor's system. This factor played a role during the sinking of the Titanic in 1912.

=== Radio Act of 1912 ===
In 1912 distress calls to aid the sinking Titanic were met with a large amount of interfering radio traffic, severely hampering the rescue effort. Subsequently, the US government passed the Radio Act of 1912 to help mitigate the repeat of such a tragedy. The act helps distinguish between normal radio traffic and (primarily maritime) emergency communication, and specifies the role of government during such an emergency.

=== The Radio Act of 1927 ===
The Radio Act of 1927 gave the Federal Radio Commission the power to grant and deny licenses, and to assign frequencies and power levels for each licensee. In 1928 it began requiring licenses of existing stations and setting controls on who could broadcast from where on what frequency and at what power. Some stations could not obtain a license and ceased operations. In section 29, the Radio Act of 1927 mentioned that the content of the broadcast should be freely present, and the government cannot interfere with this.

=== The Communications Act of 1934 ===
The introduction of the Communications Act of 1934 led to the establishment of the Federal Communications Commissions (FCC). The FCC's responsibility is to control the industry including "telephone, telegraph, and radio communications." Under this Act, all carriers have to keep records of authorized interference and unauthorized interference. This Act also supports the President in time of war. If the government needs to use the communication facilities in time of war, they are allowed to.

=== The Telecommunications Act of 1996 ===
The Telecommunications Act of 1996 was the first significant overhaul in over 60 years amending the work of the Communications Act of 1934. Coming only two dozen years after the breakup of AT&T, the act sets out to move telecommunications into a state of competition with their markets and the networks they are a part of. Up to this point the effects of the Telecommunications Act of 1996 have been seen, but some of the changes the Act set out to fix are still ongoing problems, such as being unable to create an open competitive market.

== Licensed commercial public radio stations ==
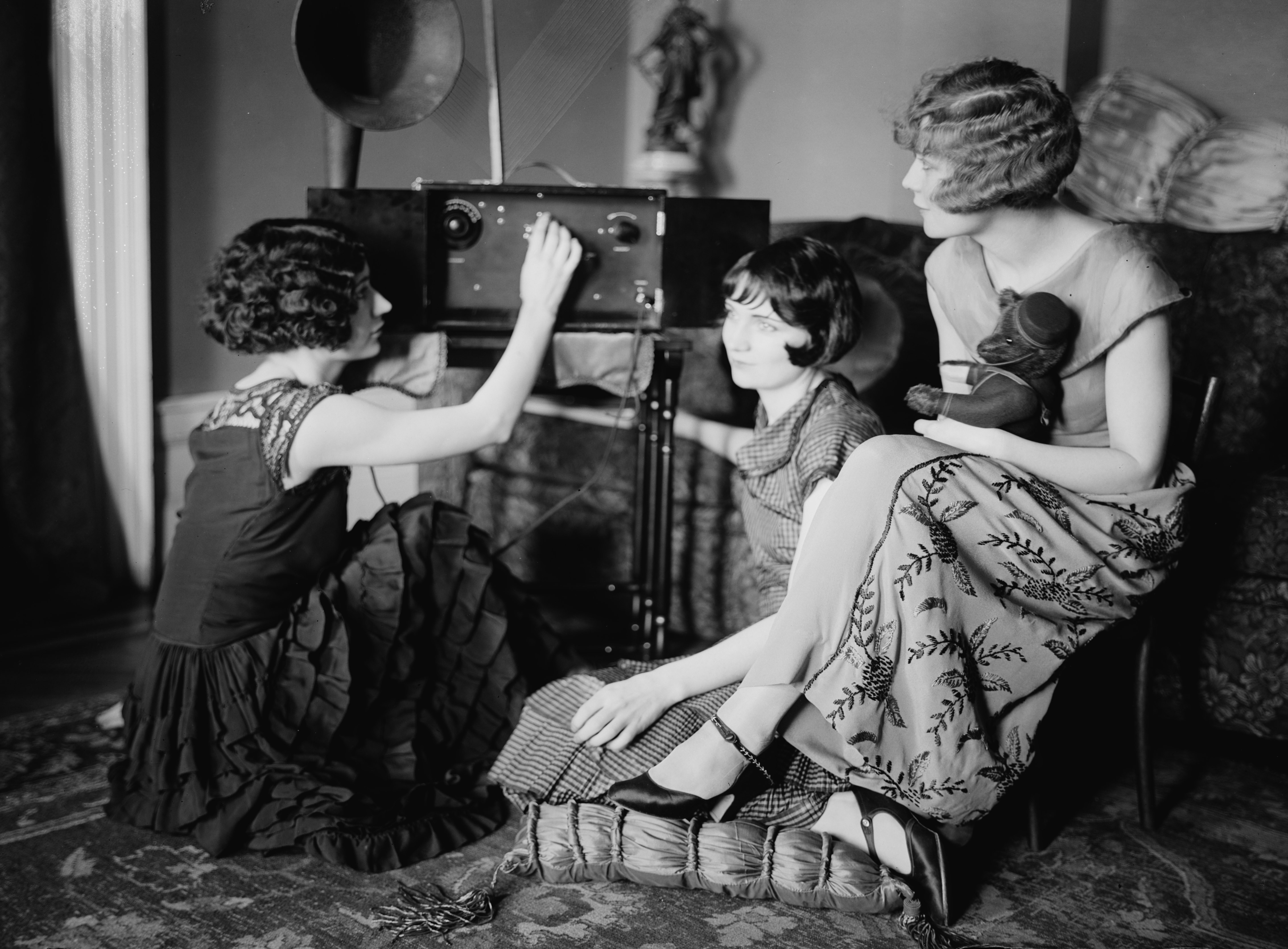
Around 1920, radio broadcasting started to get popular. The Brox Sisters, a popular singing group, gathered around the radio at the time.

The question of the 'first' publicly targeted licensed radio station in the U.S. has more than one answer and depends on semantics. Settlement of this 'first' question may hang largely upon what constitutes 'regular' programming

- It is commonly attributed to KDKA in Pittsburgh, Pennsylvania, which in October 1920 received its license and went on the air as the first US licensed commercial broadcasting station on November 2, 1920, with the presidential election results as its inaugural show, but was not broadcasting daily until 1921. (Their engineer Frank Conrad had been broadcasting from on the two call sign signals of 8XK and 8YK since 1916.) Technically, KDKA was the first of several already-extant stations to receive a 'limited commercial' license.
- On February 17, 1919, station 9XM at the University of Wisconsin in Madison broadcast human speech to the public at large. 9XM was first experimentally licensed in 1914, began regular Morse code transmissions in 1916, and its first music broadcast in 1917. Regularly scheduled broadcasts of voice and music began in January 1921. That station is still on the air today as WHA.
- On August 20, 1920, 8MK, began broadcasting daily and was later claimed by famed inventor Lee de Forest as the first commercial station. 8MK was licensed to a teenager, Michael DeLisle Lyons, and financed by E. W. Scripps. In 1921 8MK changed to WBL and then to WWJ in 1922, in Detroit. It has carried a regular schedule of programming to the present and also broadcast the 1920 presidential election returns just as KDKA did. Inventor Lee de Forest claims to have been present during 8MK's earliest broadcasts, since the station was using a transmitter sold by his company.
- The first station to receive a commercial license was WBZ, then in Springfield, Massachusetts. Lists provided to the Boston Globe by the U.S. Department of Commerce showed that WBZ received its commercial license on 15 September 1921; another Westinghouse station, WJZ, then in Newark, New Jersey, received its commercial license on November 7, the same day as KDKA did. What separates WJZ and WBZ from KDKA is the fact that neither of the former stations remain in their original city of license, whereas KDKA has remained in Pittsburgh for its entire existence.
- 2XG: Launched by Lee de Forest in the Highbridge section of New York City, that station began daily broadcasts in 1916. Like most experimental radio stations, however, it had to go off the air when the U.S. entered World War I in 1917, and did not return to the air.
- 1XE: Launched by Harold J. Power in Medford, Massachusetts, 1XE was an experimental station that started broadcasting in 1917. It had to go off the air during World War I, but started up again after the war, and began regular voice and music broadcasts in 1919. However, the station did not receive its commercial license, becoming WGI, until 1922.
- WWV, the U.S. Government time service, which was believed to have started 6 months before KDKA in Washington, D.C. but in 1966 was transferred to Ft. Collins, Colorado.
- WRUC, the Wireless Radio Union College, located on Union College in Schenectady, New York; was launched as W2XQ
- KQV, one of Pittsburgh's five original AM stations, signed on as amateur station "8ZAE" on November 19, 1919, but did not receive a commercial license until January 9, 1922.

== See also ==
- History of electrical engineering
- History of electromagnetic theory
- History of amateur radio
- History of broadcasting
- History of podcasting
- History of radar
- History of radio receivers
- History of telecommunication
- History of television
- A.S. Popov Central Museum of Communications
- Digital Audio Broadcasting (DAB)
- Internet radio
- Spark-gap transmitter
- Timeline of the introduction of radio in countries
- Wireless
- Wireless LANs

== Media and documentaries ==
- Empire of the Air: The Men Who Made Radio (1992) by Ken Burns, PBS documentary based on the 1991 book, Empire of the Air: The Men Who Made Radio by Tom Lewis, 1st ed., New York : E. Burlingame Books, ISBN 0060182156
