= Robert Goldschmidt =

Belgian chemist, physicist, and engineer (1877–1935)

Robert B. Goldschmidt
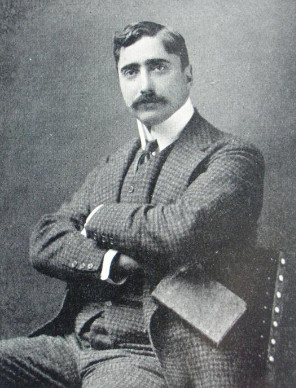
- Robert Goldschmidt in 1909
- Born: 1877
- Died: 1935 (aged 57–58); Brussels, Belgium
- Scientific career
- Fields: Physics

Robert B. Goldschmidt (1877–1935) was a Belgian chemist, physicist, and engineer who first proposed the idea of standardized microfiche (microfilm).

Goldschmidt was a polymath who also made advances in aviation and radio, among other fields. In 1913 he constructed a major radio facility at Laeken, Belgium, where in 1914 he and Raymond Braillard inaugurated Europe's first regular radio concert broadcasts. He was also a participant in the first and second international Solvay Conferences reviewing outstanding issues in chemistry and physics.

== Education and academic career ==
Educated in Brussels and Berlin, Goldschmidt was a professor of chemistry at the University of Brussels for some thirty years.

== Career ==
=== Microfilm ===
In the first years of the twentieth century, he worked with Paul Otlet on the creation of microfilm, then known as "microphotographs. In 1906, he and Otlet proposed what they called the "livre microphotographique," which they considered to be a cheaper, more space-saving means of storing data. In their 1906 essay "Sur une forme nouvelle du Livre: Le Livre Microphotographique," Goldschmidt and Otlet wrote that from the point of view of scientific research, books are not the best possible means of storing information, because "access to the libraries is not always easy and delays in the transmission of books often discourage the most tenacious workers, to the detriment of scientific progress....Travel by scholars, the international exchange of scientific books between libraries, the copies or extracts requested from abroad, are seriously under-resourced." Thus there is a need for "a new form of book that will help overcome these major inconveniences." They proposed that a solution to the problem lay in photography, and proceeded to explain how a single card measuring 12.5 X 7.5 cm, providing 72 square cm of space (margins excluded) could contain the contents of an entire 72-page book.

=== Radio ===
During the first decade of the twentieth century, Belgium became interested in how the new technology of radio communication (then known as "télégraphie sans fil" (T.S.F.)) could be of value to the country. Interest initially centered on the need to establish effective communication throughout its sprawling central African colony, the Belgian Congo. A second major project would be the construction of a high-powered station in Belgium, that could be used to maintain contact with the colony.

Much of the early developmental work was done under the patronage of the King Albert I, who had an early interest in the technology, including his own private laboratory. In 1909, the king made a tour of the Congo, and determined that there was a need to improve communications throughout its vast territory. There was also a need to establish reliable communication from Belgium to the colony. Goldschmidt was selected to take the leading role in the projects. His work in the radio field dated to 1907, when he had experimented with radiotelegraphy at the Brussels Palace of Justice; the experiments involved Tervuren, the citadel of Namur and to the observatory of Liege.

The central site for the radio projects was established at the Villa Lacoste, located near Brussels on the grounds of the summer Royal Palace of Laeken. A training school for operators, workshops and a research laboratory were established at this location. Raymond Braillard, a French engineer, was appointed as both the Chief Engineer of the Congo facilities, and the director of the Laeken installations. By the end of 1913 twelve radiotelegraph stations had been established to provide communication throughout the Belgian Congo. That same year also saw completion at Laeken of a high-powered radiotelegraph station used for transmissions to the colony. The original site included eight towers 90 to 190 meters (300 to 620 ft) tall, supporting the station's transmitting antenna. In the fall of 1913 it was reported that messages were now being successfully transmitted from Laeken to the Belgian Congo capital of Boma.

In the summer of 1914, the foundation was laid for construction of a new central antenna tower, planned to soar 333 meters (1,093 feet) high, or 33 meters (108 feet) taller than the Eiffel Tower. However, World War I broke out in late July, and the next month Germany invaded Belgium, eventually occupying 90% of the country. To keep the valuable Laeken radio facility from falling under enemy control, in August explosives and straw-fed fires were used to level the radio towers and completely destroy the equipment, a major setback to Goldschmidt's developmental work of the previous three years.

==== First European scheduled broadcasts ====
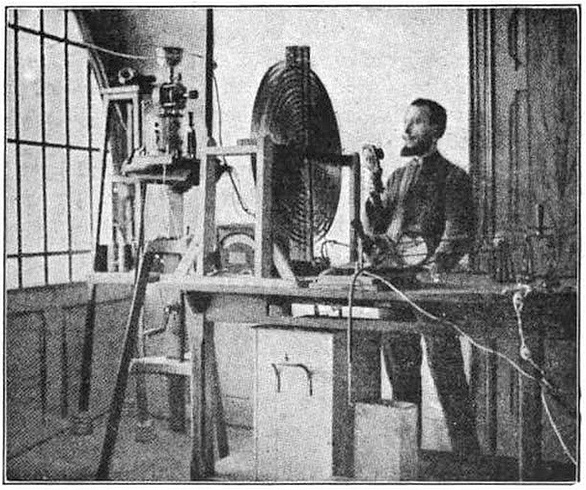
Laeken radiotelephone equipment, using a Moretti high-frequency spark transmitter and Marzi microphone. A series of weekly radio concerts was inaugurated on 28 March 1914.

The Congo stations and the high-powered Laeken station had standard spark-gap transmitters which were only capable of transmitting the dots-and-dashes of Morse code. However, prior to the destruction of the Laeken facility, experimental work was done to develop equipment capable of making audio transmissions, which led to Europe's first organized entertainment radio broadcasts. (These appear to be the second oldest known regularly scheduled radio concerts, preceded only in the United States by Charles "Doc" Herrold in San Jose, California, who began a similar series of weekly concerts in the summer of 1912.)

Because the spark transmitters required trained operators who could send and receive Morse code, Goldschmidt and Braillard began to investigate whether the stations could be converted to radiotelephone operations which would be easier to staff. In 1913 they began work on audio transmissions using a special high-frequency spark transmitter developed by Italian Riccardo Moretti, which was roughly capable of producing the "continuous-wave" signals needed to make audio transmissions. (Moretti's transmitter only approximated a true continuous-wave transmission, which limited sound quality, and reportedly when no audio was being sent, instead of silence the result was "a terrible noise in the ears"). The common practice at this time for "modulating" the transmission in order to encode sound was to insert a microphone in the aerial transmission line. This required a robust microphone that could handle strong electrical currents. In the fall of 1913, the Laeken experimenters began to employ a microphone that had been developed by Italian Giovanni Battista Marzi. Initial tests conducted in 1913 were heard by nearby amateur radio enthusiasts in Belgium and northern France, who were intrigued because previously they had only heard Morse code transmissions. The equipment was perfected to the point that by 13 March 1914 a test transmission was successfully heard at the Eiffel Tower in Paris, France, about 350 kilometers (220 miles) away.

Due to the increasing interest in the test transmissions, it was decided to introduce a series of concerts to be given at 5 p.m. each Saturday. The first of these concerts was given on 28 March 1914, and consisted of a mixture of live performers and phonograph records. On this date a second concert was given at 8:30 p.m., which was dedicated to the Belgian royal family. (Belgium's queen, Elisabeth, had shown an early interest in the radio experiments. A crystal receiver had been provided for her use, and she also received instruction in receiving Morse code.)

Very little information is available about the subsequent programmes, in part because of the loss of records caused by the chaos of World War I. Raymond Braillard later stated that the concerts lasted for only about four months, ending in July due to the start of the war. Entertainment radio broadcasts would not resume in Europe until November 1919, when a station established by Hans Idzerda, PCGG, began weekly concerts from The Hague in Holland, and they did not return to Belgium until 1923. On 28 March 1934, the Institut National de Radiodiffusion produced a broadcast commemorating the twentieth anniversary of the debut concert.

=== Belgian Congo work ===
Goldschmidt worked extensively in the Belgian Congo, where he set up a telegraph and telephone network. While in the Congo, he also devised an amphibious train and a wood-burning truck to be used in the colony.

=== Popular Laboratory of Electricity ===
In 1908 he opened a Popular Laboratory of Electricity in Brussels, a sort of museum.

=== Aviation ===
Goldschmidt developed an interest in aviation, and in 1909 constructed a dirigible balloon, La Belgique.

=== Microfilm library ===
Goldschmidt continued to be interested in microphotography throughout his life. He invented reading machines and film processes. In 1925, he and Otlet described an easily manufactured "microphotographic library." It consisted of "pocket-sized" viewing equipment and a portable cabinet that was one meter wide, one meter high, and about ten centimeters deep, and that was capable of holding, on microfilm, 18,750 volumes of 350 pages each, the equivalent of books that would fill 468 meters of conventional library shelving.

== Death ==
Goldschmidt died on 4 May 1935.

== Restitution of Nazi-looted art ==
On 7 February 2022 France's Ministry of Culture announced the restitution of two Nazi looted works to the heirs of Goldschmidt's widow, Gabrielle Philippson, a 17th century Italian school painting and an 18th century Gobelins tapestry. Found in Germany after the defeat of the Nazis, they were returned to France, which placed them in the "Musées Nationaux Récupérations" (MNR), under the numbers MNR 32 and OAR 64.
