= History of amateur radio =

Amateur radio history

The history of amateur radio, dates from the dawn of radio communications, with published instructions for building simple wireless sets appearing at the beginning of the twentieth century. Throughout its history, amateur radio enthusiasts have made significant contributions to science, engineering, industry, and social services. Research by amateur radio operators has founded new industries, built economies, empowered nations, and saved lives in times of emergency.

== Beginnings ==
Amateur radio came into being after radio waves (proved to exist by Heinrich Rudolf Hertz in 1888) were adapted into a communication system in the 1890s by the Italian inventor Guglielmo Marconi. In the late 19th century there had been amateur wired telegraphers setting up their own interconnected telegraphic systems. Following Marconi's success many people began experimenting with this new form of "wireless telegraphy". Information on "Hertzian wave" based wireless telegraphy systems (the name "radio" would not come into common use until several years later) was sketchy, with magazines such as the November, 1901 issue of Amateur Work showing how to build a simple system based on Hertz' early experiments. Magazines show a continued progress by amateurs including a 1904 story on two Boston, Massachusetts 8th graders constructing a transmitter and receiver with a range of eight miles and a 1906 story about two Rhode Island teenagers building a wireless station in a chicken coop. In the US the first commercially produced wireless telegraphy transmitter / receiver systems became available to experimenters and amateurs in 1905. In 1908, students at Columbia University formed the Wireless Telegraph Club of Columbia University, now the Columbia University Amateur Radio Club. This is the earliest recorded formation of an amateur radio club, collegiate or otherwise. In 1910, the Amateurs of Australia formed, now the Wireless Institute of Australia.

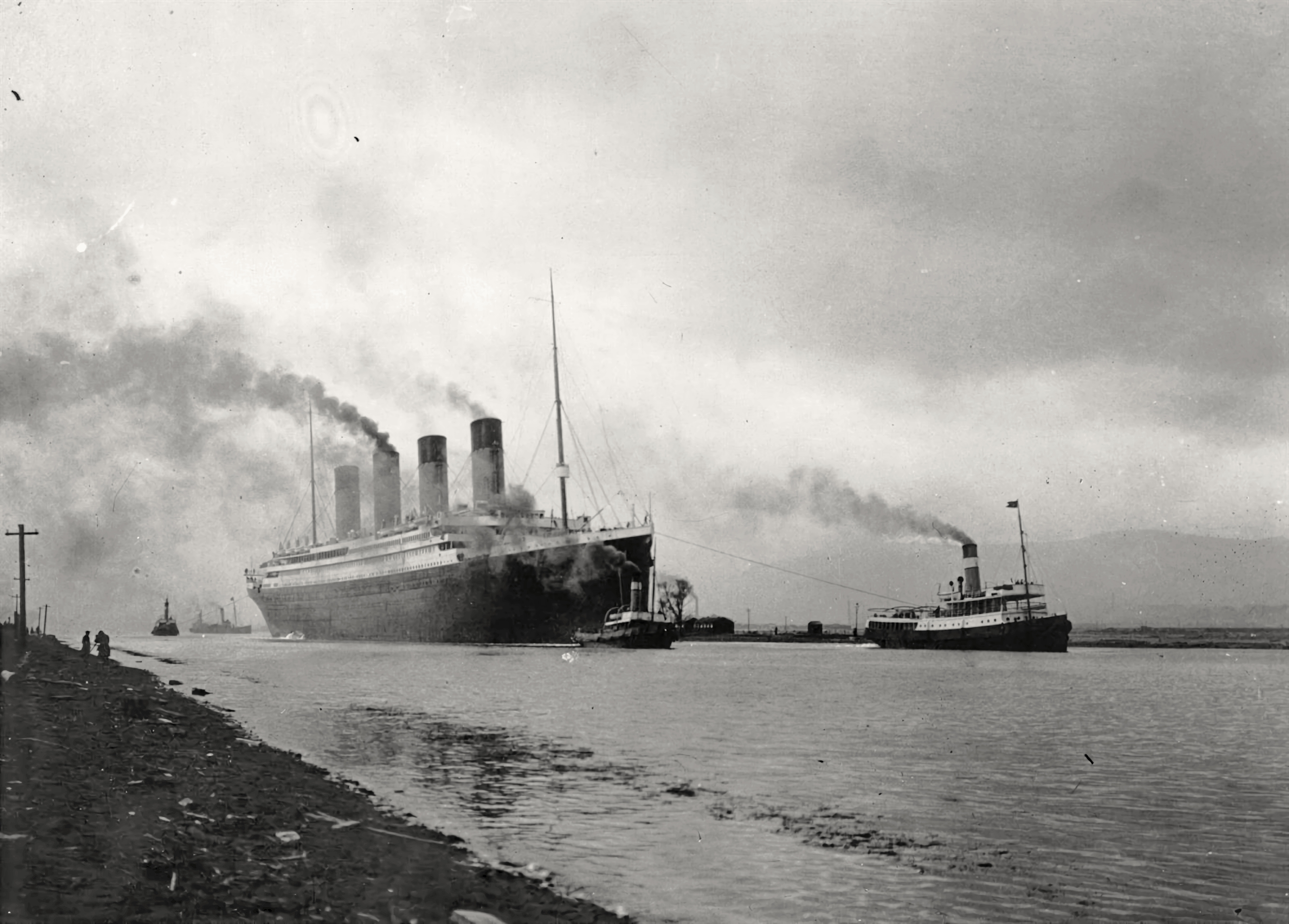
RMS Titanic (April 2, 1912).

The rapid expansion and even "mania" for amateur radio, with many thousands of transmitters set up by 1910, led to a wide spread problem of inadvertent and even malicious radio interference with commercial and military radio systems. Some of the problem came from amateurs using crude spark-transmitters that spread signals across a wide part of the radio spectrum. In 1912 after the RMS Titanic sank, the United States Congress passed the Radio Act of 1912 which restricted private stations to wavelengths of 200 meters or shorter (1500 kHz or higher). These "short wave" frequencies were generally considered useless at the time, and the number of radio hobbyists in the U.S. is estimated to have dropped by as much as 88%. Other countries followed suit and by 1913 the International Convention for the Safety of Life at Sea was convened and produced a treaty requiring shipboard radio stations to be staffed 24 hours a day. The Radio Act of 1912 also marked the beginning of U.S. federal licensing of amateur radio operators and stations. The origin of the term "ham", as a synonym for an amateur radio operator, was apparently a taunt by professional telegraphers.

== World War I ==
By 1917, World War I had put a stop to amateur radio. In the United States, Congress ordered all amateur radio operators to cease operation and even dismantle their equipment. These restrictions were lifted after World War I ended, and the amateur radio service restarted on October 1, 1919.

== Between the wars ==
In 1921, a challenge was issued by American hams to their counterparts in the United Kingdom to receive radio contacts from across the Atlantic. Soon, many American stations were beginning to be heard in the UK, shortly followed by a UK amateur being heard in the US in December 1922. November 27, 1923 marked the first transatlantic two-way contact between American amateur Fred Schnell and French amateur Léon Deloy. Shortly after, the first two way contact between the UK and USA was in December 1923, between London and West Hartford, Connecticut. In the following months 17 American and 13 European amateur stations were communicating. Within the next year, communications between North and South America; South America and New Zealand; North America and New Zealand; and London and New Zealand were being made. These international Amateur contacts helped prompt the first International Radiotelegraph Conference, held in Washington, DC, USA in 1927–28. At the conference, standard international amateur radio bands of 80/75, 40, 20 and 10 meters and radio callsign prefixes were established by treaty.

This period also saw the first attempt to communicate from the Arctic during Donald Baxter MacMillans 1923 expedition.

In 1933 Robert Moore, W6DEI, begins single-sideband voice experiments on 75 meter lower sideband. By 1934, there were several ham stations on the air using single-sideband.

== World War II ==
During the German occupation of Poland, the priest Fr. Maximilian Kolbe, SP3RN was arrested by the Germans. The Germans believed his amateur radio activities were somehow involved in espionage and he was transferred to Auschwitz on May 28, 1941. After some prisoners escaped in 1941, the Germans ordered that 10 prisoners be killed in retribution. Fr. Kolbe was martyred when he volunteered to take the place of one of the condemned men. On October 10, 1982 he was canonized by Pope John Paul II as Saint Maximilian Kolbe, Apostle of Consecration to Mary and declared a Martyr of charity. He is considered the Patron saint of Amateur radio operators.

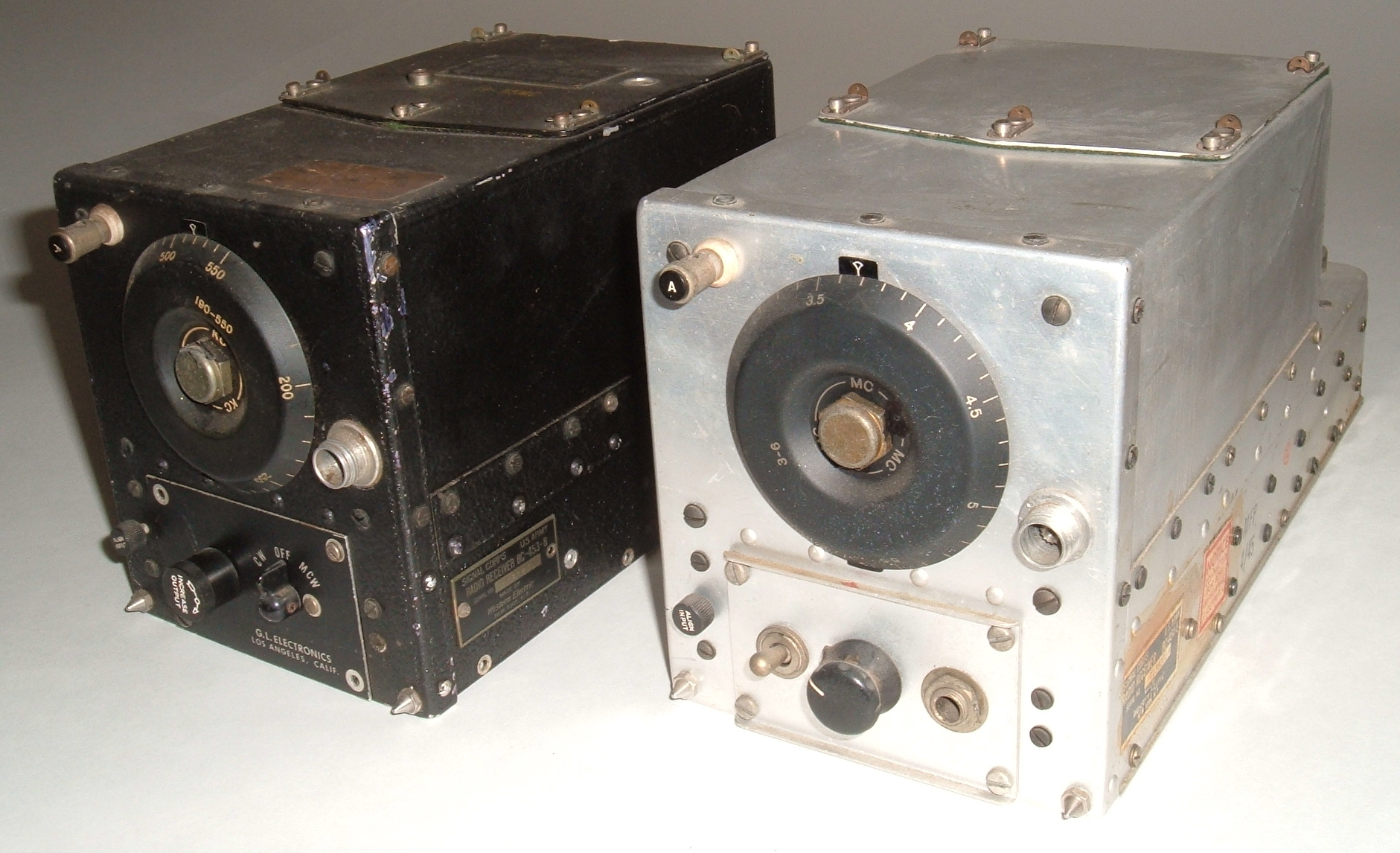
Two radios in the ARC-5 series. Unit on the left is a BC-453-B, covering 190-550 kHz; the one on the right is a BC-454-E, covering 3-6 MHz. Both have been modified for Amateur Radio use by replacing the front connector with a small control panel.

Again during World War II, as it had done during the first World War, the United States Congress suspended all amateur radio operations. With most of the American amateur radio operators in the armed forces at this time, the US government created the War Emergency Radio Service which would remain active through 1945. After the War the amateur radio service began operating again, with many hams converting war surplus radios, such as the ARC-5, to amateur use.

== Post war era ==
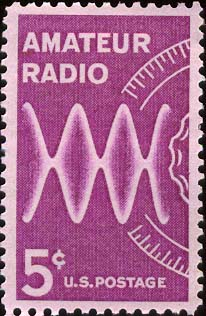
A U.S. Postage Stamp from 1964, commemorating amateur radio.

In 1947, the uppermost 300 kHz segment of the world allocation of the 10 meter band from 29.700 MHz to 30.000 MHz was taken away from amateur radio.

During the 1950s, hams helped pioneer the use of single-sideband modulation for HF voice communication. In 1961 the first orbital amateur radio satellite was launched. OSCAR I would be the first of a series of amateur radio satellites created throughout the world.

Ham radio enthusiasts were instrumental in keeping U.S. Navy personnel stationed in Antarctica in contact with loved ones back home during the International Geophysical Year during the late 1950s.

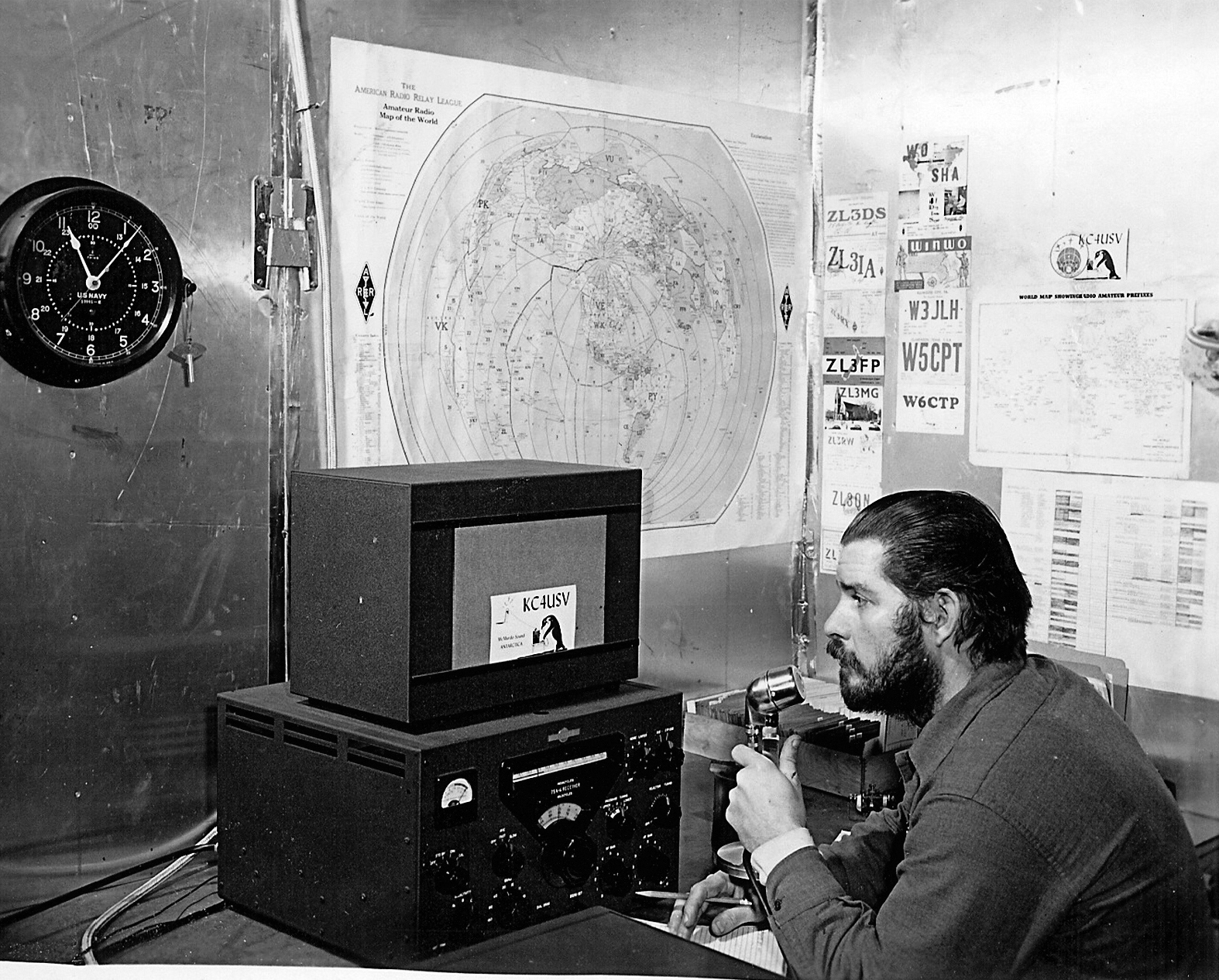
U.S. Navy Chief Petty Officer Adrey Garret uses a ham radio at Williams Air Operating Facility during the 1956 winter. Ham radio was the only means of voice communication with friends and family back in the U.S. for navy personnel living and working in Antarctica in the days before satellite telephone technology became common.

== Late 20th century ==
At the 1979 World administrative radio conference in Geneva, Switzerland, three new amateur radio bands were established: 30 meters, 17 meters and 12 meters. Today, these three bands are often referred to as the WARC bands by hams.

During the Falklands War in 1982, Argentine forces seized control of the phones and radio network on the islands and had cut off communications with London. Scottish amateur radio operator Les Hamilton, GM3ITN was able to relay crucial information from fellow hams Bob McLeod and Tony Pole-Evans on the islands to British military intelligence in London, including the details of troop deployment, bombing raids, radar bases and military activities. During 1999 NATO bombing of Yugoslavia, Yugoslav amateur radio operators exchanged information from posts in public shelters. However, owing to an informal code of conduct, radio hams usually avoid controversial subjects and political discussions.

Major contributions to communications in the fields of automated message systems and packet radio were made by amateur radio operators throughout the 1980s. These computer controlled systems were used for the first time to distribute communications during and after disasters.

American entry-level Novice and Technician class licensees were granted CW and SSB segments on the 10 Meter Band in 1987. The frequency ranges allocated to them are still known today throughout much of the world as the Novice Sub Bands even though it is no longer possible to obtain a Novice class license in the US.

Further advances in digital communications occurred in the 1990s as Amateurs used the power of PCs and sound cards to introduce such modes as PSK31 and began to incorporate digital signal processing and software-defined radio into their activities.

== 21st century ==
For many years, amateur radio operators were required by international agreement to demonstrate Morse code proficiency in order to use frequencies below 30 MHz. In 2003 the World radiocommunications conference (WRC) met in Geneva, Switzerland, and voted to allow member countries of the International Telecommunication Union to eliminate Morse code testing if they so wished .

On December 15, 2006, the United States Federal Communications Commission (FCC) issued a Report and Order eliminating all Morse code testing requirements for all American Amateur Radio License applicants, which took effect February 23, 2007. The relaxing of Morse code tests has also occurred in most other countries, resulting in a boosting in the number of radio amateurs worldwide.

While there is no longer a requirement for hams to learn "the Code", it remains a popular communications mode.

Most of Europe allows licensed operators from other countries to obtain permits to transmit in Europe during visits. Residential permits are available in many countries globally whereby a valid license from one country will be honored by other countries under international treaties. As of late 2024 only North Korea has an absolute ban on amateur radio operation within its borders.

Amateur radio emergency communications assisted in disaster relief activities for events such as the September 11 attacks in 2001, Hurricane Katrina in 2005, and the Sichuan earthquake in 2008. In 2017, the Red Cross requested 50 amateur radio operators be dispatched to Puerto Rico to provide communications services in the wake of Hurricane Maria.

== See also ==
- Amateur radio licensing in the United States - Contains history of U.S. amateur licensing by the Department of Commerce, the Federal Radio Commission and finally by the Federal Communications Commission.
- Etymology of ham radio
- Women in early radio

== Notes and references ==
- Cain, James D. (2003). YASME: The Danny Weil and Colvin Radio Expeditions. Newington, Connecticut, USA: American Radio Relay League. ISBN 0-87259-893-4
- DeSoto, Clinton B. (1936). 200 Meters and Down: The Story of Amateur Radio. West Hartford, Connecticut, USA: American Radio Relay League. ISBN 0-87259-001-1
- Gregory, Danny and Sahre, Paul (2003). Hello World: A Life in Ham Radio. Princeton Architectural Press. ISBN 1-56898-281-X
- Haring, Kristen (2006). Ham Radio's Technical Culture. The MIT Press. ISBN 0-262-08355-8.
- Messerschmidt, Donald A. (1997). Moran of Kathmandu: Pioneer Priest, Educator and Ham Radio Voice of the Himalaya. Orchard Press. ISBN 974-8299-72-4
- Bartlett, Richard A. (2007) The World of Ham Radio, 1901–1950, A Social History. ISBN 978-0-7864-2966-0
- Lombry, Thierry, LX4SKY, The History of Amateur Radio
