= PCGG =

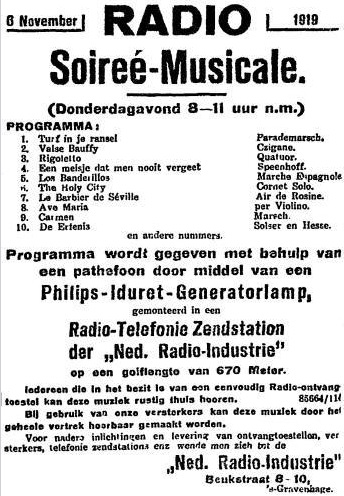
Advertisement placed in the 5 November 1919 Nieuwe Rotterdamsche Courant announcing PCGG's debut broadcast scheduled for the next evening.

PCGG (also known as the Dutch Concerts station) was a radio station located at The Hague in the Netherlands, which began broadcasting a regular schedule of entertainment programmes on 6 November 1919. The station was established by engineer Hanso Idzerda, and is believed to have been Europe's first sustained broadcasting station, as well as one of the first stations in the world to transmit entertainment intended for a general audience.

PCGG's schedule generally featured one or two evening programmes per week. Although located on the west coast of Holland, the station had a large audience across the English Channel in Great Britain. However, Idzerda ran into financial difficulties, and PCGG's licence was revoked on 11 November 1924, one month before his company, Nederlandsche Radio-Industrie, shut down due to bankruptcy.

== History ==
=== Formation ===
Hans Idzerda was an electrical engineer, who worked with the Philips manufacturing company during World War I. (Holland was a neutral country during this conflict, and largely avoided the immense destruction caused by the war.) Idzerda founded his own company, which became known as Nederlandsche Radio-Industrie by the end of the war. Together with Philips, he developed the Philips-Iduret-Generatorlamp radio tube.

An agreement with Philips gave Idzerda the exclusive right to sell tubes to the general public and amateur radio enthusiasts. His quota was to sell at least 180 a year, and in the first year achieved 1,200 sales. In order to promote sales, Idzerda began a series of demonstration transmissions, the first of which was made during the Third Dutch Trade Fair held in Utrecht from February 24 to March 8, 1919. While most audio radio transmissions at this time employed AM (amplitude modulation) signals, Idzerda patented a method for "narrow-band" FM (frequency modulation) transmissions. (This is in contrast to the modern day "wide band" FM, originally developed in the 1930s by Edwin Howard Armstrong.) This could be picked up by standard receivers, although they had to be slightly deturned in order to receive the signals using slope detection.

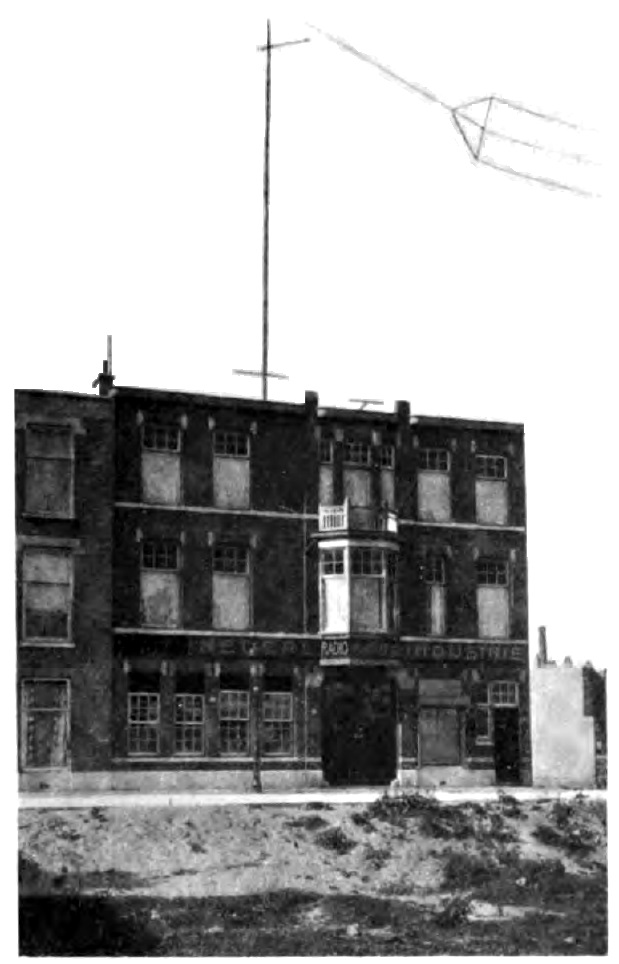
PCGG was located at the Nederlandsche Radio-Industrie building at Beukstraat 8-10 in the Hague, Netherlands (April 1921)

On 11 June 1919 Idzerda was granted permission to operate a radio station, although the permit technically limited him to communication with designated military radio stations. The new station was issued the randomly assigned call sign of PCGG. Adopting a generous interpretation of the activities allowed by his station authorization, on 6 November he embarked on a weekly series of entertainment broadcasts. The schedule for the first programme was advertised the day before the broadcast in a local newspaper. Idzerda called it a "Radio Soirée-Musicale" (French for "evening musical"), which was transmitted from 8:00 to 11:00 p.m. on a mediumwave wavelength of 670 metres (448 kHz).

=== British audience ===
The station began a series of twice-weekly programmes, which soon drew attention, and a majority of its listeners, from across the English Channel in Great Britain. In May 1920 a British publication, The Wireless World, informed its readers that the 29 April and 2 May broadcasts many had heard had originated at PCGG, although many listeners, unaware of the Dutch station, had assumed they were a part of the ongoing test transmissions at the Marconi company's Chelmsford station. In June the magazine further reported that PCGG's schedule was 6:40 to 10:40 p.m. on Thursdays, and 1:40 to 3:40 p.m. on Sundays. The transmitter was rated at about 500 watts, operating on a wavelength that ranged from 800 to 1,000 metres (375 to 300 kHz). In August, the magazine reported that the summer schedule was reduced to one programme per week, on Thursdays from 6:40 to 9:40 p.m, now operating on 1,000 metres. Also, instead of gramophone recordings, the programmes would feature a small musical band that included a piano, violin and cello.

The cost of running PCGG began to be a financial burden, especially after the twice-weekly schedule was resumed, as the switch to live performances required hiring paid musicians. In addition, to better serve the British audience the station had incurred costs related to upgrading the signal. In the September 1921 issue of The Wireless World, a letter from W. W. Burnham suggested that the magazine open a subscriptions list to collect donations, and the resulting contributions were forwarded to support PCGG's operations.

During this time the London Daily Mail newspaper had been working with the Marconi company to give publicity broadcasts on an irregular schedule, highlighted by a performance by dame Nellie Melba on 15 June 1920. However, this use of valuable radio wavelengths was considered to be frivolous by the Postmaster General, who on November 23, 1920 informed the House of Commons that the broadcasts "have been suspended". Seeking an additional outlet, the Daily Mail turned to PCGG, providing financing for its programmes from July 1922 until July 1923. The series debut was held the evening of July 27, 1922, and featured Australian contralto Lily Payling. (Idzerda later commented "She had so many pretensions regarding accompaniment, accommodation, care, locality and what a spoiled artist can invent more, that I had to rest for a week after the broadcast to recover from it.")

=== Final activities ===
With the end of the Daily Mail support, PCGG again faced daunting financing issues. Reports for this time period state that the station was operating on a wavelength of around 1050 metres (285 kHz), which suffered significant interference from British amateurs operating spark transmitters on 1000 metres (300 kHz). Also, in 1922 the Postmaster General began to relent on the ban of British broadcasting stations, beginning with 2MT at Writtle and 2LO in London. In the fall, the British Broadcasting Company (BBC) was formed, which established a network of stations covering the country with strong signals, which greatly reduced British interest in trying to pick up PCGG from across the channel.

Expansion in Holland also reduced the interest in PCGG. In the early part of 1924 a syndicate of Dutch listeners was formed to collect money to finance programmes, carried at no expense, by the radio station located at the Nederlandsche Seintoestellen Fabriek (NSF) manufacturing plant in Hilversum. PCGG even had to shut down for a short period in the fall of 1923 when local residents complained about the noise being made by its electrical generators.

PCGG's licence was revoked on 11 November 1924 due to Idzerda's financial difficulties, and his company was declared bankrupt a month later. There were a couple of later reports that he had resumed broadcasting, but this appears to have been limited to a few experimental transmissions. A 1926 report stated that Netherland Association Idzerda-Radio had received a new PCGG transmitting licence, but there was no additional information about station activities. In 1930, a second report stated that a new authorization, with the call letters PFI-IDZ, had been issued to the Idzerda Radio Works, for experimental transmissions every Saturday night between 11:40 p.m. and 1:40 a.m. on 299 metres (1000 kHz), but again this was at best a very limited effort.

Idzerda himself came to a tragic end, executed in 1944 by occupying German troops on the suspicion of espionage.

PCGG The Hague, Netherlands

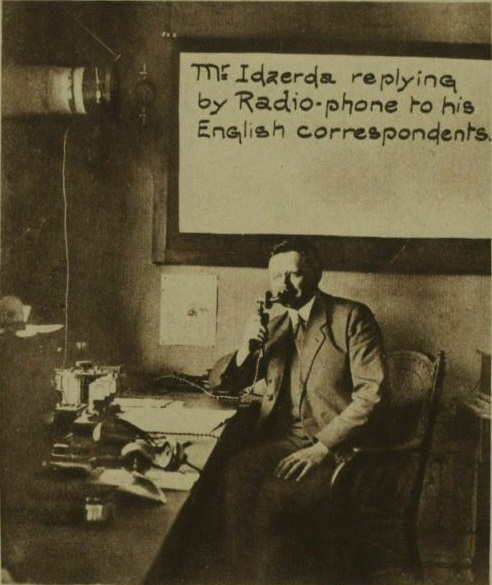
Hans Idzerda, founder of the Nederlandsche Radio-Industrie and PCGG (April 1922)

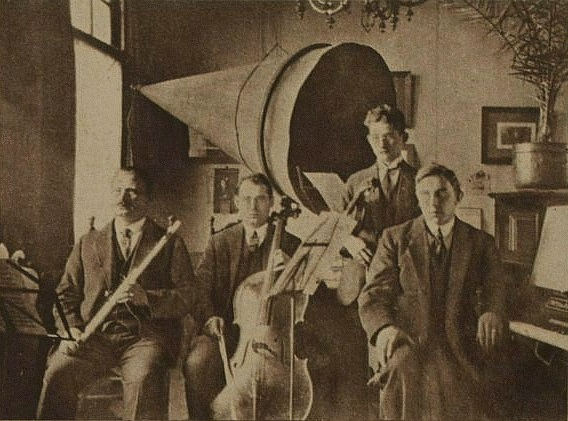
Musicians in the PCGG studio. The over-sized horn in the background was connected to the transmitter's pickup microphone (April 1922)

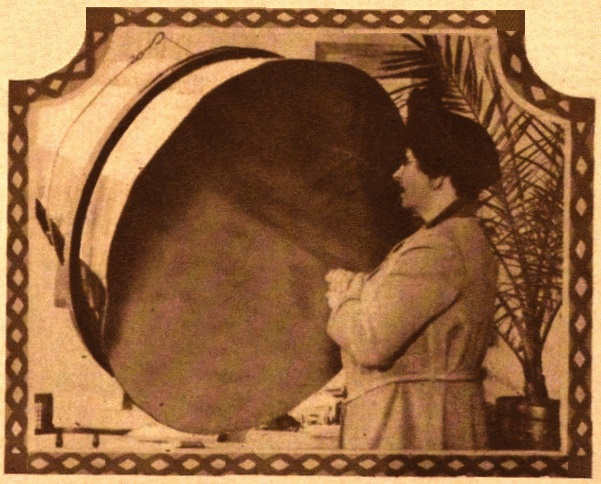
Lily Payling, Australian contralto, was the featured performer for the debut of the Daily Mail sponsored concerts (July 1922)

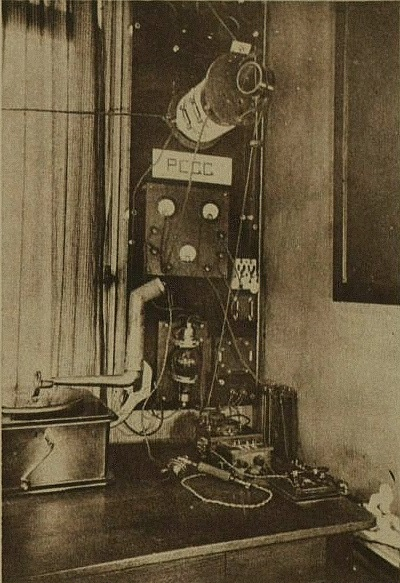
PCGG's "narrow-band FM" radio transmitter (April 1922)

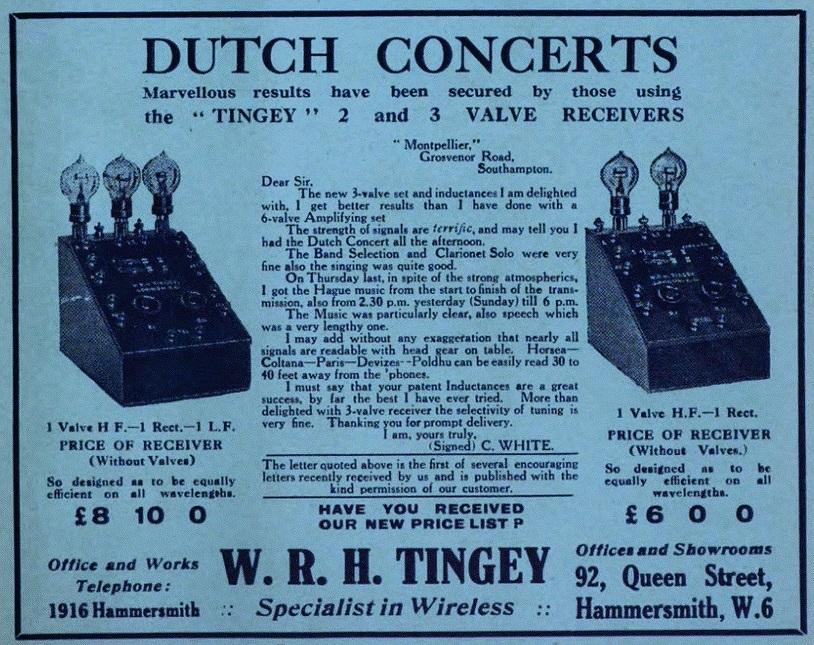
British advertisement for radio receivers capable of receiving the PCGG concerts (November 1921)

== See also ==
- History of radio
- List of the world's oldest radio stations
- Timeline of radio
