= Hanso Idzerda =

Dutch radio host (1885–1944)

Hanso Schotanus á Steringa Idzerda (26 September 1885 – 2 November 1944) was a Dutch scientist, entrepreneur and pioneer in radio technology.

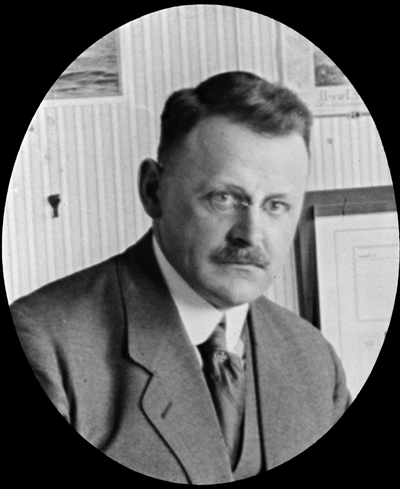
Idzerda in 1919

== Early life and education ==
Idzerda was born in Weidum, Friesland as the son of Henrikus Idzerda, a country doctor, and Wilhelmina Frederika van de Wetering. His first names were officially Hans Henricus Schotanus à Steringa and were a variant of the first names of his grandfather Hanso Henricus Schotanus a Sterringa Idzerda (1831-1893), who was a physician, surgeon, and midwife in Rauwert. Although coming from a family of doctors, he decided to study engineering at the Rheinisches Technikum in Bingen am Rhein, Germany, which he completed in 1913 as an electrical engineer.

== Career ==
He then settled in Scheveningen in the Ten Hovestraat as an independent consultant "for the application of electricity in every field". He probably first registered at his branch in The Hague in June 1913 under his first names Hanso Henricus and the surname Schotanus à Steringa Idzerda. The first names Schotanus à Steringa were therefore included in the surname.

Between 1907 and 1917 he worked on further developing the triode vacuum tube that had already been invented in America in 1906 by Lee de Forest. The Eindhoven light bulb factory of Philips took the tube into production in 1918 under the name PH-IDZ (Philips Ideezet). The tube had a limitation, because it was only suitable for transmitting Morse code. It was not yet possible to transmit sound. To achieve this, transmitting triode tubes with greater frequency range and a greater power were required. Together with Philips, Idzerda developed several improved test models.

Idzerda focused on the development of radio transmitting and receiving equipment. In his own company, under the name Technische Bureau Wireless, he started manufacturing equipment, which he supplied to the Dutch army, among others. During the First World War, he experimented at the presbytery of his parents-in-law, the Nicolaï family in Mantgum. With radio direction finders he built himself, he was able to determine the location of radio transmitters, including those of German zeppelins that sailed to England. The Dutch armed forces made grateful use of his information.

During the Utrecht Jaarbeurs, at the end of February 1919, he demonstrated radiotelephonic transmissions over a distance of 1200 meters for the first time in the Netherlands. The excitement among the audience was great and even the then Queen Wilhelmina came to listen.

On 6 November 1919 he held the first public airing of a radio program. His program consisted of music, and him talking for a bit in between pieces. The PCGG transmitter he invented was capable of transmitting signals from The Hague all the way to England. Herman de Man, later to be an important author and radio maker, was present. From then on the program aired every week. In 1922 the Daily Mail decided to sponsor Idzerda, who previously financed the operation with his own money and some donations. After the Daily Mail ceased its support Idzerda's company went bankrupt.

== Execution ==
On 2 November 1944, a V-2 rocket that was being tested crashed close to his house, and Idzerda decided to take a look. He was ordered to leave the area but later snuck back to the rocket and was promptly executed.
