= KYJ (Los Angeles) =

Radio station in Los Angeles, California (1921–1923)

KYJ was a short-lived radio station in Los Angeles, located atop Hamburger's department store and licensed to the Leo J. Meyberg Company. It was issued its first license in December 1921 and deleted 1 1/2 years later.

== History ==
=== 6XAK ===
Although KYJ was first licensed as a broadcasting station in late 1921, this was actually a relicensing and continuation of operations begun under an experimental license, 6XAK, (Note: The "6" in 6XAK's call sign indicated that the station was located in the sixth Radio Inspection district, while the "X" meant that it was operating under an Experimental license.) issued to the Leo J. Meyberg Company a few months earlier. The Meyberg Company was an electronic parts distributor, with offices in Los Angeles and San Francisco, and boasted it had "the largest radio stock of the Pacific coast". 6XAK was the second station established by Meyberg to provide a broadcasting service, as earlier in the year the company began operating 6XG (later KDN) from the Fairmont Hotel in San Francisco.

6XAK was installed by E. G. Arnold and Hall Berringer, who was sales manager of the Western Radio Electric Company. which operated experimental station 6XD (predecessor to broadcasting station KZC/KOG). 6XAK began operating in September 1921, transmitting on a wavelength of 310 meters (968 kHz) from Hamburger's department store (which became the May Company in 1923) at 8th and Broadway in downtown Los Angeles, and the station quickly received national attention. It debuted with a 5-watt transmitter, which was said, very optimistically, to have "a sending day range of 100 miles [160 km] and a night range twice that distance". The studio was located on Hamburger's top floor, and visitors were invited to watch broadcasts through soundproof windows and listen to the program over outside speakers. Featured programming in October included four Scotti Grand Opera Company singers, and the broadcast of 1921 World Series baseball reports.

In conjunction with the opening of the station, Hamburger's introduced free radio classes, which could accommodate forty at a time, and were "aimed to fit students for the Federal exam for license as a first-class amateur wireless operator". The store reported that locating the classroom in the store's Boys' department resulted in increased traffic, and "This number of boys passing through the clothing department will provide the store with a large group of interested potential customers, the benefit of which has already been seen in the rapidly increasing trade noted during the winter in the Boys' Department."

In December 1921 6XAK was reported to be broadcasting daily (except Sunday) concerts at 4:00-5:00 p.m., with additional concerts from 8:00-9:00 p.m. on Monday, Thursday and Saturday. During this time the station transmitted on a wavelength of 266 meters (1128 kHz).

=== KYJ ===
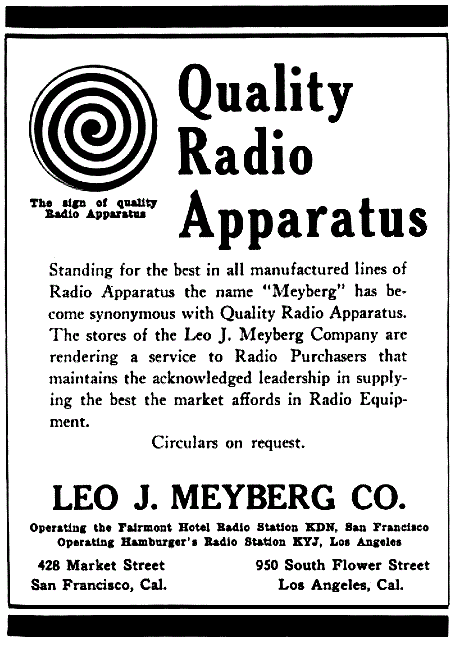
The Leo J. Meyberg Company operated two early radio broadcasting stations: KYJ in Los Angeles and KDN in San Francisco.

From 1912 to 1927 radio communication in the United States was regulated by the Department of Commerce, and originally there were no formal requirements for stations, most of which operated under Amateur and Experimental licenses, making broadcasts intended for the general public. In order to provide a common standard, the department issued a regulation effective December 1, 1921, requiring that broadcasting stations would now have to hold a Limited Commercial license that authorized operation on two designated broadcasting wavelengths: 360 meters (833 kHz) for "entertainment", and 485 meters (619 kHz) for "market and weather reports".

On December 9, 1921, a broadcasting station license with the randomly assigned call letters KYJ was issued to Leo J. Meyberg Company for its Los Angeles station, for operation on 360 meters. (A day earlier the company's 6XG in San Francisco was relicensed as KDN). A few months later KYJ received permission to also broadcast on the 485-meter "market and weather reports" wavelength.

KYJ continued to provide a wide array of programming. However, because initially the 360 meter wavelength was the only available "entertainment" frequency, the growing number of the stations in the region had to create a timesharing agreement to assign individual operating slots. By mid-May 1922, KYJ was assigned 8:00-9:00 a.m. on Monday, Thursday and Saturday; 2:30-3:00 p.m. on Monday through Thursday; and 3:00-3:30 p.m. every weekday. An August 1922 schedule reported the assignment of 5:00-6:00 p.m. on Monday, Wednesday, Friday and Saturday, plus 8:00-9:00 p.m. on Tuesday and Friday. A November 1, 1922 schedule, covering eight Los Angeles stations, specified KYJ's hours as 3:30-5:00 p.m. and 6:45-7:30 p.m. Monday; 3:00-4:00 p.m., 4:30-5:00 p.m. and 6:45-7:30 p.m. Tuesday; 3:00-4:00 p.m. and 6:45-7:30 p.m. Wednesday through Friday; 4:00-5:00 p.m. and 6:45-7:30 p.m. Saturday; and 6:45-7:30 p.m. Sunday.

KYJ's program schedule for the third week of December included an extensive range of offerings for "Hamburger's radiophone co-operating with the Los Angeles Express in selection of program". However, shortly thereafter the January 6, 1923 edition of Radio Doings reported that the Hamburger's store had discontinued broadcasting, and the licenses for both KYJ and KDN were deleted on May 1, 1923.

== See also ==
- List of initial AM-band station grants in the United States
