= WKN =

WKN may stand for: .

- WKN (AM), a radio station in Memphis, Tennessee, United States, that was licensed from 1922 to 1923
- Wertpapierkennnummer, a German securities identification code
- World Kickboxing Network
