= KJJ (disambiguation) =

KJJ was a short-lived radio station in California.

KJJ may also refer to:

- Khinalug language, ISO 639-3 code
- Kajjansi Airfield (IATA code)
- Jaroslav Ježek Conservatory (Czech: Konzervatoř Jaroslava Ježka), a music school in Czech Republic
