= WGH =

WGH may refer to:

- WGH (AM), a radio station (1310 AM) licensed to serve Newport News, Virginia, United States
- WGH-FM, a radio station (97.3 FM) licensed to serve Newport News, Virginia
- WGH (Alabama), a radio station (833 AM) licensed to Montgomery, Alabama in 1922
- Warren G. Harding, 29th president of the United States
- Westmorland General Hospital, a hospital in Cumbria, England
- WGH (company), a British manufacturing company
