= WWT =

WWT may refer to:

- Wastewater treatment, a process whereby contaminants are eliminated from wastewater
- Wildfowl & Wetlands Trust, an international wildfowl and wetland conservation charity based in the United Kingdom
- WorldWide Telescope, an open-source online service
- Newtok Airport (IATA code WWT), a public airport in Alaska, U.S.
- World Wide Technology, an American technology services company
- WWT (AM), 1922 Buffalo, New York radio station
