= KGB (San Francisco) =

Radio station in San Francisco (1921–1922)

KGB was a broadcasting station authorization issued to Edwin L. Lorden in San Francisco, California, on December 8, 1921, and canceled on March 23 of the next year. The station does not appear to have actually made any broadcasts.

== History ==
The San Francisco Bay Area was an important center of early radio development, including entertainment broadcasts dating back to at least 1912, when Charles Herrold in San Jose inaugurated a series of weekly concerts. Civilian stations were temporarily silenced during World War I, but in 1919 the wartime ban was lifted, and a number of individuals in the region, operating under Experimental and Amateur licenses, began making regular broadcasts intended for the general public.

In order to provide common standards for the developing service, the Commerce Department, which began regulating U.S. radio in 1912, issued a regulation effective December 1, 1921, that broadcasting stations would now have to hold a Limited Commercial license that authorized operation on designated wavelengths of 360 meters (833 kHz) for "entertainment", and 485 meters (619 kHz) for "market and weather reports". On December 8, 1921, a broadcasting station license with the randomly assigned call letters KGB was issued to Edwin L. Lorden at 602 California Street in San Francisco, for operation on 360 meters. This, and the Leo J. Meyberg Company's KDN, were the first two broadcasting station authorizations issued for San Francisco under the new regulations.

Unlike most early broadcasting station licensees, Edwin L. Lorden apparently had no previous experience in radio, and it is questionable what station use he intended, as there are no reports that KGB ever made any broadcasts. Lorden was a stock broker and the manager of the Aftergood and Company stock company, with its main office at 574 California Street in San Francisco. He also was operating under a legal cloud, and on March 21, 1922, an arrest warrant was issued charging him with embezzling shares of stock and money from multiple clients in San Jose and San Francisco. Two days later KGB's license, which had initially been set to run for a one-year period, was canceled.

Lorden was arrested a few days later. Detectives searching his company's San Francisco office made an interesting discovery: a "pocket radio system" portable receiver, which Lorden had contracted to be built by a local engineer, C. C. Brown, which could be secreted under an overcoat, and was designed to allow Lorden to obtain radiotelegraphed transmissions of stock prices before the other brokers received them.

This transmission scheme was initially described as being classified as an "illegal transmission by a federal law". However, it was soon established that the system had never been used, moreover it was reported that "it is said that had it been used it is doubtful if criminal action could have been taken". In any event, Lorden was suspected of swindling $40,000 from "dozens of working girls, women and profession men"; later that year, he was found guilty of an initial charge of embezzling $400.

== See also ==
- List of initial AM-band station grants in the United States
