= WLK (disambiguation) =

WLK is an abbreviation for World of Warcraft: Wrath of the Lich King, the second expansion set for World of Warcraft.

WLK or Wlk may also refer to:

- wlk, the ISO 639-3 code for Wailaki language
- Selawik Airport, the IATA code WLK
- Windows Logo Kit, a software framework
- Allan Wlk, a Paraguayan footballer
- Westlake Corporation, the NYSE code WLK
- We Love Katamari, a 2005 videogame
- WLK (AM), radio station located in Indianapolis, Indiana from 1922 until 1923
