= KJQ =

KJQ may refer to:

- KJQ (California), a Stockton AM radio station licensed from 1921 to 1925
- KLO-FM, a Salt Lake City FM station which held the call letters KJQN from 2004 to 2012 and used the slogan "Classic Alternative KJQ"
- the language code for the Keres language
- KJQ: King Jackie Queen, 2026 Indian film
