= WPO =

WPO may refer to:

== Computing and math ==
- Web performance optimization, in website optimization
- Well partial order, an ordering relation in mathematics
- Whole program optimization, a compiler optimization

== Other uses ==
- North Fork Valley Airport (IATA code), in the List of airports in Colorado, US
- Weakly Pareto Optimal
- Warsaw Pact Organisation, a former military alliance
- Washington Post Company (former NYSE symbol)
- World Photography Organisation, for amateur and professional photographers
- Wikipediocracy
- World Intellectual Property Organization, sometimes abbreviated as WPO
- WPO (AM), Memphis, Tennessee radio station, which was licensed from 1922 until 1923

== See also ==
- WPO-3, 1941 plans for the defense of the Philippine Islands in the Battle of Bataan
