= List of initial AM-band station grants in the United States =

Review of first U.S. radio broadcasting stations

List of initial AM-band station grants in the United States reviews the first standard radio broadcasting stations that were authorized in the United States.

This review begins with the introduction of the broadcasting service in the United States, through the end of June 1922. (Temporary station grants are listed separately. Also omitted are stations in other service categories, such as WQB in Hartford, Connecticut, and government stations WWV in Washington, D. C. and WVP in New York City, which were never listed as broadcasting stations.)

Initially there were no formal standards for radio stations making broadcasts for the general public, and a variety of stations, most operating under Experimental or Amateur station licenses, conducted broadcasts on a regular schedule. On December 1, 1921, the U.S. Department of Commerce, which regulated radio at this time, adopted the first regulation formally establishing a broadcasting station category, which set aside the wavelength of 360 meters (833 kHz) for entertainment broadcasts, and 485 meters (619 kHz) for market and weather reports. However, at the time of the formal establishment of the broadcast service, there were already nine stations with Limited Commercial licenses providing regular broadcasts, which are listed below by the pre-December 1, 1921 date of their initial licenses.

== List information ==
Exact dates in most cases are from station licenses and Department of Commerce card files. Dates only listing a month are from the monthly issues of the Radio Service Bulletin.

- Station's Initial Broadcast Service Authorization: The list is arranged chronologically.
  - Type: most stations began broadcasting after being issued a standard Limited Commercial license (LIC). However, in a few cases the initial grant was by telegram (TG), telephone (TP), or via an unspecified "Authorization" (AUT) or Special Temporary Authority (STA). "REL" indicates a relicensing of a previously existing station.

KDKA's October 27, 1920 Limited Commercial license. The first four pages are the station's license, pages 5 and 6 are the station's Form 761 application, and page 7 is supplemental application information.

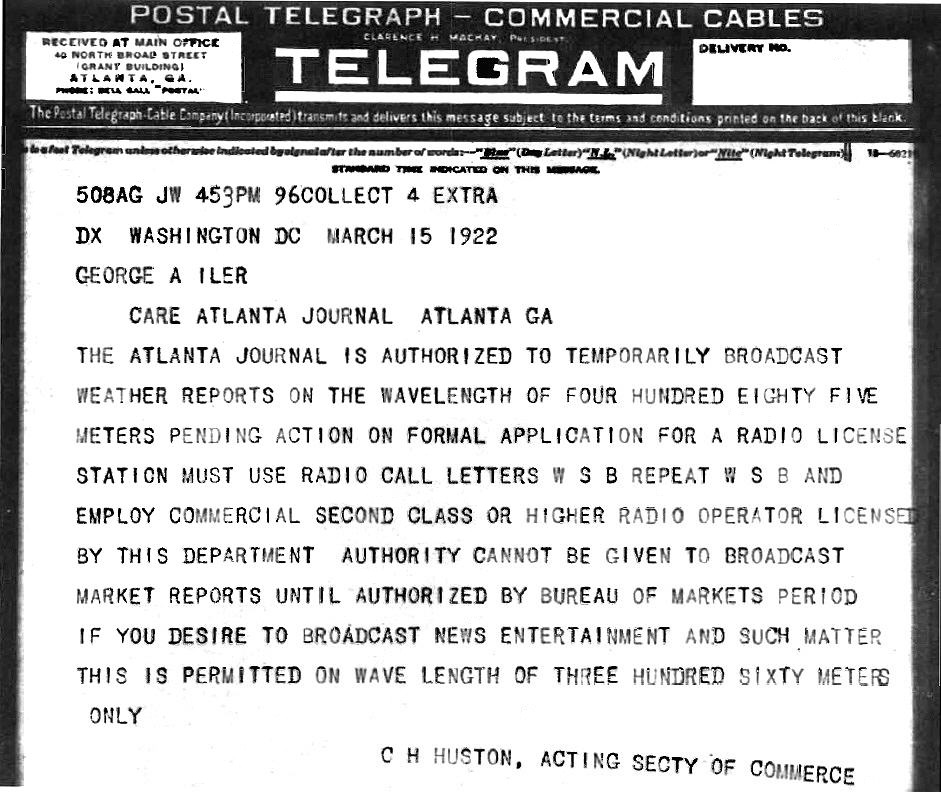
In a successful effort to be the first newspaper to operate a station in Atlanta, Georgia, the Atlanta Journal arranged to have its initial authorization for WSB issued by telegram.

  - Freq: E stands for 360 meters (833 kHz), the "entertainment" wavelength, while M indicates 485 meters (619 kHz), the "markets and weather" wavelength.
- Application Received (Call Letters Assigned): In contrast to the later policy of stations being assigned call letters only after their application has been approved, during the period reviewed the reverse was true, with applications assigned call letters immediately upon arrival in Washington, D.C.
  - Type: Most applications came via a Form 761, "Applicant's Description of Apparatus" (761), although there were a few cases listing telegram (TG), telephone (TP) or letter (LET). TRN denotes cases where an already existing station was transferred to the broadcasting service.
  - Loc: refers to the location from which the station's Form 761 was received. In most cases this was via a Regional Radio Inspector located at the following sites: Baltimore, Maryland (BAL), Boston, Massachusetts (BOS), Chicago, Illinois (CHI), Detroit, Michigan (DET), New Orleans, Louisiana (NO), Norfolk, Virginia (NOR), New York City (NYC), Philadelphia, Pennsylvania (PHI), Seattle, Washington (SEA), and San Francisco, California (SF). Other routes included via owner (OWN) or from W. E. Downey (WED).

Note on back of Commerce's Call Letter card for KDKA states that its initial application was a Form 761 and letter received in Washington, D.C. on October 22, 1920, via the Radio Inspector based in Detroit, Michigan

- First Broadcast License: Although for most stations, their initial license was also their first broadcasting service license, stations initially authorized by other means, including by telegram or telephone, had their first license issued sometime later. Also, licenses, prior to WBZ's September 15, 1921 grant, did not list 360 meters as a transmitting wavelength. This is why WBZ is sometimes reported to be the oldest radio station.
  - Dur: Duration of license grant. At first 1 year (1YR) was most common, which eventually changed to 3 months (3M).
  - Num: Serial number assigned to the station's Limited Commercial licenses.

== Station list ==
Initial Broadcast Service Stations in the United States
Station's Initial Broadcast Service Authorization								Application Received (Call Letters Assigned)			First Broadcast License			Status
#	Date	Call	Community	Jurisdiction	Owner	Freq	Type	Date	Type	Loc	Date	Dur	Num	Status
1	10/27/1920	KDKA	East Pittsburgh	Pennsylvania	Westinghouse Electric & Mfg Co	E	LIC	10/22/1920	761	DET	11/07/1921	1YR	174	KDKA Pittsburgh, Pennsylvania
2	05/--/1921	WJZ	Newark	New Jersey	Westinghouse Electric & Mfg Co	E	LIC	--/--/----	---	---	09/30/1921	1YR	230	WABC New York, New York
3	09/15/1921	WBZ	Springfield	Massachusetts	Westinghouse Electric & Mfg Co	E	LIC	--/--/----	---	---	09/15/1921	3M	224	WBZ Boston, Massachusetts
4	09/19/1921	WDY	Roselle Park	New Jersey	Radio Corporation of America	E	LIC	09/16/1921	761	NYC	09/19/1921	3M	225	deleted 02/20/1923
5	09/29/1921	WCJ	New Haven	Connecticut	A. C. Gilbert Company	E	LIC	09/23/1921	761	BOS	09/29/1921	1YR	232	deleted 12/01/1922
6	10/13/1921	WJX	New York	New York	De Forest Radio Telephone & Telegraph	E	LIC	10/05/1921	761	NYC	10/13/1921	1YR	236	deleted 06/--/1924
7	10/13/1921	KQL	Los Angeles	California	Arno A. Kluge	E	LIC	--/--/----	---	---	10/13/1921	1YR	238	deleted 06/09/1922
8	10/13/1921	WBL	Detroit	Michigan	Detroit News	E	LIC	10/06/1921	761	DET	10/13/1921	1YR	239	WWJ Detroit, Michigan
9	11/09/1921	KYW	Chicago	Illinois	Westinghouse Electric & Mfg Co	E	?TP	11/09/1921	TP	CHI	11/15/1921	1YR	241	KYW Philadelphia, Pennsylvania
10	12/07/1921	KWG	Stockton	California	Portable Wireless Telephone Company	E	LIC	12/07/1921	761	SF	12/07/1921	1YR	245	KWG Stockton, California
11	12/08/1921	WJH	Washington	D. C.	White & Boyer Company	E	LIC	12/03/1921	761	BAL	12/08/1921	1YR	243	deleted 03/26/1924
12	12/08/1921	KFC	Seattle	Washington	Northern Radio & Electric Company	E	LIC	12/03/1921	761	SEA	12/08/1921	1YR	244	deleted 01/23/1923
13	12/08/1921	KDN	San Francisco	California	Leo J. Meyberg Company	E	LIC	12/03/1921	761	SF	12/08/1921	1YR	246	deleted 05/01/1923
14	12/08/1921	KGC	Hollywood	California	Electric Lighting Supply Company	E	LIC	--/--/----	---	---	12/08/1921	1YR	248	KNX Los Angeles, California
15	12/08/1921	KGB	San Francisco	California	Edwin L. Lorden	E	LIC	--/--/----	---	---	12/08/1921	1YR	259	deleted 03/23/1922
16	12/09/1921	KVQ	Sacramento	California	J. C. Hobrecht	E	LIC	12/07/1921	761	SF	12/09/1921	1YR	250	deleted 01/02/1923
17	12/09/1921	KZM	Oakland	California	Preston D. Allen	E	LIC	12/07/1921	761	SF	12/09/1921	1YR	251	deleted 06/23/1931
18	12/09/1921	KZC	Los Angeles	California	Western Radio Electric Company	E	LIC	12/07/1921	761	SF	12/09/1921	1YR	252	deleted 03/09/1923-KOG
19	12/09/1921	KZY	Oakland	California	Atlantic-Pacific Radio Supplies	E	LIC	12/07/1921	761	SF	12/09/1921	1YR	253	deleted 01/24/1923
20	12/09/1921	KYJ	Los Angeles	California	Leo J. Meyberg Company	E	LIC	12/07/1921	761	SF	12/09/1921	1YR	254	deleted 05/01/1923
21	12/09/1921	KQW	San Jose	California	Charles D. Herrold	E	LIC	12/07/1921	761	SF	12/09/1921	1YR	255	KCBS San Francisco, California
22	12/20/1921	KYY	San Francisco	California	The Radio Telephone Shop	E	LIC	12/16/1921	761	SF	12/20/1921	1YR	256	deleted 01/24/1923
23	12/20/1921	KJJ	Sunnyvale	California	The Radio Shop	E	LIC	12/16/1921	761	SF	12/20/1921	1YR	257	deleted 06/16/1923
24	12/20/1921	KJQ	Stockton	California	C. O. Gould	E	LIC	12/16/1921	761	SF	12/20/1921	1YR	258	deleted 04/--/1925 (?)
25	12/22/1921	WDT	New York	New York	Ship Owners Radio Service	E	LIC	12/22/1921	761	NYC	12/22/1921	10D	260	deleted 12/28/1923
26	12/22/1921	WDM	Washington	D. C.	Church of the Covenant	E	LIC	12/22/1921	761	BAL	12/22/1921	30D	261	deleted 06/08/1925
27	12/22/1921	WDW	Washington	D. C.	Radio Construction & Electric Co	E	LIC	12/22/1921	761	---	12/22/1921	30D	262	deleted 05/--/1922
28	12/29/1921	WOU	Omaha	Nebraska	R. B. Howell	EM	LIC	12/29/1921	761	---	12/29/1921	1YR	264	deleted 06/23/1923
29	12/30/1921	WMH	Cincinnati	Ohio	Precision Equipment Company	EM	LIC	12/29/1921	761	DET	12/30/1921	1YR	263	deleted 12/11/1923
30	01/04/1922	KLB	Pasadena	California	J. J. Dunn & Company	E	LIC	01/03/1922	761	SF	01/04/1922	1YR	267	deleted 04/25/1923
31	01/04/1922	KLP	Los Altos	California	Colin B. Kennedy Company	E	LIC	01/03/1922	761	SF	01/04/1922	1YR	268	deleted 03/09/1923
32	01/09/1922	KQV	Pittsburgh	Pennsylvania	Doubleday-Hill Electric Company	E	TRN	--/--/----	---	---	01/09/1922	6M	452	KQV Pittsburgh, Pennsylvania
33	01/10/1922	WPB	Pittsburgh	Pennsylvania	Newspaper Printing Company	E	LIC	01/10/1922	761	DET	01/10/1922	6M	272	deleted 05/05/1922
34	01/13/1922	WLB	Minneapolis	Minnesota	University of Minnesota	EM	LIC	--/--/----	---	---	01/13/1922	6M	275	KUOM Minneapolis, Minnesota
35	01/13/1922	WHA	Madison	Wisconsin	University of Wisconsin	EM	LIC	--/--/----	---	---	01/13/1922	5M	276	WHA Madison, Wisconsin
36	01/18/1922	WNO	Jersey City	New Jersey	Wireless Telephone-Hudson County NJ	E	LIC	01/18/1922	761	NYC	01/18/1922	6M	277	deleted 03/--/1923 (?)
37	01/26/1922	WDZ	Toledo	Ohio	Marshall-Gerken Company	EM	LIC	--/--/----	---	---	01/26/1922	3M	271	deleted 03/20/1922 relicensed 04/22/1922 as WBAJ [202]
38	01/26/1922	WLK	Indianapolis	Indiana	Hamilton Manufacturing Company	E	LIC	01/18/1922	761	CHI	01/26/1922	3M	281	deleted 06/01/1923
39	02/03/1922	WGH	Montgomery	Alabama	Montgomery Light & Water Power Co	E	LIC	02/01/1922	761	NO	02/03/1922	3M	284	deleted 06/05/1922
40	02/04/1922	WGY	Schenectady	New York	General Electric Company	E	LIC	02/03/1922	761	NYC	02/04/1922	3M	285	WGY Schenectady, New York
41	02/07/1922	WGI	Medford Hillside	Massachusetts	American Radio & Research Corp	E	LIC	02/01/1922	761	BOS	02/07/1922	3M	289	deleted 04/--/1927 (?) (WARC)
42	02/08/1922	WGL	Philadelphia	Pennsylvania	Thomas F. J. Howlett	E	LIC	02/01/1922	761	BAL	02/08/1922	3M	287	deleted 12/31/1924
43	02/08/1922	KGF	Pomona	California	Pomona Fixture & Wiring Company	E	LIC	02/01/1922	761	SF	02/08/1922	3M	288	deleted 12/06/1922
44	02/13/1922	KUO	San Francisco	California	Examiner Printing Company	E	LIC	02/14/1922	761	SF	02/13/1922	30D	291	deleted 01/21/1926
45	02/16/1922	WOK	Pine Bluff	Arkansas	Pine Bluff Company	E	LIC	02/15/1922	ASN	---	02/16/1922	3M	292	deleted 06/--/1924
46	02/16/1922	WOZ	Richmond	Indiana	Palladium Printing Company	EM	LIC	02/16/1922	LET	OWN	02/16/1922	3M	293	deleted 04/09/1923
47	02/17/1922	WOQ	Kansas City	Missouri	Western Radio Company	EM	LIC	02/16/1922	761	CHI	02/17/1922	3M	294	deleted 06/14/1934
48	02/18/1922	WOC	Rock Island	Illinois	Karlowa Radio Company	EM	LIC	02/18/1922	761	---	02/18/1922	3M	296	WOC Davenport, Iowa
49	02/20/1922	WOR	Newark	New Jersey	L. Bamberger & Company	E	LIC	02/17/1922	761	NYC	02/20/1922	3M	297	WOR New York, New York
50	02/20/1922	WOH	Indianapolis	Indiana	Hatfield Electric Company	E	LIC	02/18/1922	761	CHI	02/20/1922	3M	298	deleted 02/14/1923
51	02/21/1922	WBU	Chicago	Illinois	City of Chicago	E	LIC	02/09/1922	761	CHI	02/21/1922	3M	219	deleted 11/07/1923
52	02/21/1922	WHK	Cleveland	Ohio	Warren R. Cox	E	LIC	02/20/1922	761	DET	02/21/1922	3M	300	WHK Cleveland, Ohio
53	02/23/1922	WOS	Jefferson City	Missouri	Missouri State Marketing Bureau	M	LIC	02/20/1922	761	CHI	02/23/1922	3M	302	deleted 03/27/1936
54	02/24/1922	WFO	Dayton	Ohio	Rike-Kumler Company	EM	LIC	02/24/1922	761	DET	02/24/1922	3M	303	deleted 11/28/1922
55	02/24/1922	WHQ	Rochester	New York	Rochester Times Union	EM	LIC	02/17/1922	761	DET	02/24/1922	3M	304	deleted 10/02/1922
56	02/24/1922	WHW	East Lansing	Michigan	Stuart Seeley (US Weather Bureau)	M	LIC	02/24/1922	761	DET	02/24/1922	3M	305	deleted 01/16/1923
57	02/24/1922	WRK	Hamilton	Ohio	Doron Brothers Electric Company	E	LIC	02/24/1922	761	DET	02/24/1922	3M	306	deleted 09/29/1930
58	02/28/1922	KHQ	Seattle	Washington	Louis Wasmer	E	LIC	--/--/----	---	---	02/28/1922	3M	307	KQNT Spokane, Washington
59	02/28/1922	KFU	Gridley	California	The Precision Shop	E	LIC	02/25/1922	761	SF	02/28/1922	3M	308	deleted 07/22/1922
60	02/28/1922	WHU	Toledo	Ohio	William B. Duck Company	E	LIC	02/25/1922	761	OWN	02/28/1922	3M	309	deleted 10/27/1922
61	02/28/1922	WJK	Toledo	Ohio	Service Radio Equipment Company	E	LIC	02/28/1922	761	DET	02/28/1922	3M	311	deleted 02/01/1923
62	03/02/1922	WLW	Cincinnati	Ohio	Crosley Manufacturing Company	E	LIC	03/02/1922	761	DET	03/02/1922	3M	312	WLW Cincinnati, Ohio
63	03/02/1922	WRL	Schenectady	New York	Union College	E	LIC	03/02/1922	761	NYC	03/02/1922	3M	313	deleted 12/18/1924
64	03/09/1922	KJR	Seattle	Washington	Vincent I. Kraft	EM	LIC	03/06/1922	761	SEA	03/09/1922	3M	---	KJR Seattle, Washington
65	03/10/1922	KLS	Oakland	California	Warner Brothers	E	LIC	03/06/1922	761	SF	03/10/1922	3M	---	KMKY Oakland, California
66	03/10/1922	KJS	Los Angeles	California	Bible Institute of Los Angeles	E	LIC	03/06/1922	761	SF	03/10/1922	3M	315	KWKW Los Angeles, California
67	03/10/1922	KLZ	Denver	Colorado	Reynolds Radio Company	EM	LIC	03/06/1922	761	CHI	03/10/1922	3M	316	KLZ Denver, Colorado
68	03/11/1922	KSL	San Francisco	California	The Emporium	E	LIC	03/11/1922	761	SF	03/11/1922	3M	318	deleted 06/16/1923
69	03/11/1922	WBS	Newark	New Jersey	D. W. May	E	LIC	03/11/1922	761	NYC	03/11/1922	3M	319	deleted 07/18/1962-WHBI
70	03/11/1922	KRE	Berkeley	California	Maxwell Electric Company	E	LIC	03/11/1922	761	SF	03/11/1922	3M	320	KVTO Berkeley, California
71	03/13/1922	WRR	Dallas	Texas	City of Dallas	EM	TRN	08/05/1921	761	NO	03/13/1922	3M	213	KTCK Dallas, Texas
72	03/14/1922	WPM	Washington	D. C.	Thomas J. Williams	E	LIC	03/06/1922	---	WED	03/14/1922	3M	325	deleted 05/10/1923
73	03/14/1922	WRW	Tarrytown	New York	Tarrytown Radio Research Lab	E	LIC	03/11/1922	761	NYC	03/14/1922	3M	326	deleted 07/31/1926
74	03/14/1922	WIK	McKeesport	Pennsylvania	K & L Electric Company	E	LIC	03/14/1922	761	DET	03/14/1922	3M	328	deleted 03/09/1925
75	03/14/1922	WIL	Washington	D. C.	Continental Electrical Supply	E	LIC	03/14/1922	761	BAL	03/14/1922	3M	329	deleted 09/13/1924
76	03/14/1922	KSD	Saint Louis	Missouri	Post Dispatch	E	LIC	03/07/1922	TG	OWN	03/14/1922	3M	330	KTRS Saint Louis, Missouri
77	03/14/1922	WGR	Buffalo	New York	Federal Telephone & Telegraph	EM	LIC	03/11/1922	761	DET	03/14/1922	3M	331	WGR Buffalo, New York
78	03/14/1922	KGU	Honolulu	Hawaii	Marion A. Mulrony	E	LIC	03/11/1922	761	SF	03/14/1922	3M	332	KGU Honolulu, Hawaii
79	03/14/1922	WGF	Des Moines	Iowa	The Register & Tribune	E	TG	03/14/1922	TG	OWN	04/04/1922	3M	596	deleted 09/29/1923
80	03/15/1922	KGO	Altadena	California	Altadena Radio Laboratory	E	LIC	03/11/1922	761	SF	03/15/1922	3M	324	deleted 08/21/1923
81	03/15/1922	KGG	Portland	Oregon	Hallock & Watson Radio Service	E	LIC	03/14/1922	761	SEA	03/15/1922	3M	327	deleted 11/25/1924
82	03/15/1922	WSB	Atlanta	Georgia	Atlanta Journal	EM	TG	03/15/1922	TG	OWN	04/11/1922	3M	630	WSB Atlanta, Georgia
83	03/16/1922	WHD	Morgantown	West Virginia	West Virginia University	E	LIC	03/11/1922	761	DET	03/16/1922	3M	333	deleted 11/19/1923
84	03/16/1922	WSL	Utica	New York	J & M Electric Company	E	LIC	03/11/1922	761	DET	03/16/1922	3M	334	deleted 04/29/1925
85	03/16/1922	KDPT	San Diego	California	Southern Electrical Company	E	TRN	03/01/1922	761	SF	03/16/1922	3M	335	deleted 03/19/1925
86	03/16/1922	WPA	Fort Worth	Texas	Fort Worth Record	E	LIC	03/16/1922	761	NO	03/16/1922	3M	336	deleted 05/24/1923
87	03/16/1922	WKY	Oklahoma City	Oklahoma	Oklahoma Radio Shop	EM	LIC	03/06/1922	761	NO	03/16/1922	3M	337	WKY Oklahoma City, Oklahoma
88	03/17/1922	WGM	Atlanta	Georgia	Atlanta Constitution	EM	TG	03/15/1922	761	---	04/28/1922	---	---	deleted 08/28/1923
89	03/18/1922	WHN	Ridgewood	New York	Ridgewood Times Printing & Publish	E	LIC	03/17/1922	761	NYC	03/18/1922	3M	338	WEPN New York, New York
90	03/18/1922	KHJ	Los Angeles	California	C. R. Kierulff & Company	E	LIC	03/18/1922	761	SF	03/18/1922	3M	339	KHJ Los Angeles, California
91	03/18/1922	KOP	Detroit	Michigan	Detroit Police Department	E	LIC	03/17/1922	761	DET	03/18/1922	3M	340	deleted 11/28/1925
92	03/18/1922	WBT	Charlotte	North Carolina	Southern Radio Corporation	E	LIC	03/17/1922	761	BAL	03/18/1922	3M	341	WBT Charlotte, North Carolina
93	03/18/1922	WOO	Philadelphia	Pennsylvania	John Wanamaker	E	LIC	03/17/1922	761	BAL	03/18/1922	3M	342	deleted 02/20/1929
94	03/18/1922	WFI	Philadelphia	Pennsylvania	Strawbridge & Clothier	E	LIC	03/16/1922	761	BAL	03/18/1922	3M	345	WFIL Philadelphia, Pennsylvania
95	03/20/1922	KOA	Denver	Colorado	Young Men's Christian Association	M	LIC	03/17/1922	761	CHI	03/20/1922	3M	343	deleted 06/23/1923
96	03/20/1922	WIP	Philadelphia	Pennsylvania	Gimbel Brothers	E	LIC	03/16/1922	761	PHI	03/20/1922	3M	344	WTEL Philadelphia, Pennsylvania
	03/20/1922	WDZ [37] Toledo, Ohio deleted. (Relicensed 04/22/1922 as WBAJ [202])												
97	03/21/1922	WRP	Camden	New Jersey	Federal Inst of Radio Telegraphy	E	LIC	03/21/1922	761	BAL	03/21/1922	3M	348	deleted 08/20/1923
98	03/21/1922	WCN	Worcester	Massachusetts	Clark University	EM	LIC	03/17/1922	761	BOS	03/21/1922	3M	349	deleted 06/25/1923
99	03/21/1922	WJT	Erie	Pennsylvania	Electric Equipment Company	E	LIC	03/21/1922	761	DET	03/21/1922	3M	350	deleted 10/21/1922
100	03/21/1922	WSX	Erie	Pennsylvania	Erie Radio Company	E	LIC	03/21/1922	761	DET	03/21/1922	3M	351	deleted 01/26/1923
101	03/21/1922	WGV	New Orleans	Louisiana	Interstate Electric Company	E	LIC	03/17/1922	761	NO	03/21/1922	3M	352	deleted 06/--/1924
102	03/21/1922	KGW	Portland	Oregon	Oregonian Publishing Company	E	LIC	03/20/1922	761	SEA	03/21/1922	3M	353	KPOJ Portland, Oregon
103	03/22/1922	WCM	Austin	Texas	University of Texas	EM	LIC	03/17/1922	761	NO	03/22/1922	3M	554	KTRH Houston, Texas
104	03/23/1922	WEY	Wichita	Kansas	Cosradio Company	EM	LIC	03/17/1922	761	CHI	03/23/1922	3M	---	deleted 06/23/1923
105	03/23/1922	KFZ	Spokane	Washington	Doerr-Mitchell Electric Co	E	LIC	03/22/1922	761	SEA	03/23/1922	3M	556	deleted 09/08/1923
106	03/23/1922	WKC	Baltimore	Maryland	Joseph M. Zamoiski Company	E	LIC	03/22/1922	761	BAL	03/23/1922	3M	557	deleted 11/24/1923
107	03/23/1922	WMU	Washington	D. C.	Doubleday-Hill Electric Company	E	LIC	03/22/1922	761	BAL	03/23/1922	3M	558	deleted 10/--/1925 (?)
108	03/23/1922	WEV	Houston	Texas	Hurlburt-Still Electrical Company	EM	LIC	03/17/1922	761	NO	03/23/1922	3M	559	deleted 01/10/1925
109	03/23/1922	WEW	Saint Louis	Missouri	Saint Louis University	M	LIC	03/17/1922	761	CHI	03/23/1922	3M	560	WEW Saint Louis, Missouri
110	03/23/1922	WKN	Memphis	Tennessee	Riechman-Crosby Company	EM	LIC	03/22/1922	761	NO	03/23/1922	3M	562	deleted 06/11/1923
111	03/23/1922	KMJ	Fresno	California	San Joaquin Light & Power Corp	E	LIC	03/23/1922	761	SF	03/23/1922	3M	563	KMJ Fresno, California
112	03/23/1922	KQT	Yakima	Washington	Electric Power & Appliance Company	E	LIC	03/22/1922	761	SEA	03/23/1922	3M	564	deleted 10/06/1922
	03/23/1922	KGB [15] San Francisco, California deleted.												
113	03/24/1922	WWZ	New York	New York	John Wanamaker	E	?TG	03/24/1922	---	---	04/17/1922	3M	649	deleted 11/05/1923
114	03/25/1922	WWT	Buffalo	New York	McCarthy Brothers & Ford	E	LIC	03/25/1922	761	DET	03/25/1922	3M	555	deleted 10/02/1922
115	03/25/1922	WWI	Dearborn	Michigan	Ford Motor Company	E	LIC	03/24/1922	761	DET	03/25/1922	3M	565	deleted 04/24/1926
116	03/25/1922	KFV	Yakima	Washington	Foster-Bradbury Radio Store	E	LIC	03/24/1922	761	SEA	03/25/1922	3M	566	deleted 05/05/1923
117	03/27/1922	WWB	Canton	Ohio	Daily News Printing Company	E	LIC	03/24/1922	761	DET	03/27/1922	3M	568	deleted 11/19/1923
118	03/27/1922	WNJ	Albany	New York	Shotton Radio Manufacturing Company	E	LIC	03/24/1922	761	NYC	03/27/1922	3M	569	deleted 06/--/1924
119	03/27/1922	WPG	New Lebanon	Ohio	Nushawg Poultry Farm	E	LIC	03/24/1922	761	DET	03/27/1922	3M	570	deleted 02/19/1924
120	03/27/1922	WMC	Youngstown	Ohio	Columbia Radio Company	E	LIC	03/24/1922	761	DET	03/27/1922	3M	571	deleted 12/19/1922
121	03/28/1922	WHX	Des Moines	Iowa	Iowa Radio Corporation	E	TG	--/--/----	---	---	--/--/----	---	---	deleted 05/--/1922
122	03/28/1922	WSV	Little Rock	Arkansas	L M Hunter & G L Carrington	E	LIC	03/24/1922	761	NO	03/28/1922	3M	572	deleted 11/06/1922
123	03/28/1922	WPO	Memphis	Tennessee	United Equipment Company	E	LIC	03/24/1922	761	NO	03/28/1922	3M	573	deleted 06/12/1923
124	03/28/1922	WRM	Urbana	Illinois	University of Illinois	E	LIC	03/24/1922	761	CHI	03/28/1922	3M	574	WILL Urbana, Illinois
125	03/28/1922	KYG	Portland	Oregon	Willard P. Hawley Junior	E	LIC	03/28/1922	761	SEA	03/28/1922	3M	575	deleted 10/13/1922
126	03/28/1922	WAH	El Dorado	Kansas	Midland Refining Company	EM	LIC	03/27/1922	761	CHI	03/28/1922	3M	576	deleted 03/06/1923
127	03/29/1922	WSY	Birmingham	Alabama	Alabama Power Company	E	LIC	03/24/1922	761	NO	03/29/1922	3M	578	deleted 10/30/1924
128	03/29/1922	WTK	Paris	Texas	Paris Radio Electric Company	E	LIC	03/24/1922	761	DET	03/29/1922	3M	579	deleted 11/20/1922
129	03/29/1922	WGU	Chicago	Illinois	The Fair	E	LIC	03/29/1922	761	CHI	03/29/1922	3M	580	WSCR Chicago, Illinois
130	03/29/1922	WEH	Tulsa	Oklahoma	Midland Refining Company	M	?	03/29/1922	761	NO	--/--/----	---	581	deleted 06/12/1923
131	03/30/1922	WDV	Omaha	Nebraska	John O. Yeiser Junior	E	LIC	03/30/1922	761	CHI	03/30/1922	3M	583	deleted 02/07/1923
132	03/30/1922	WTP	Bay City	Michigan	George M. McBride	E	LIC	03/24/1922	761	DET	03/30/1922	3M	584	deleted 07/20/1923
133	03/30/1922	KGY	Lacey	Washington	Saint Martin's College (Rev S Ruth)	E	LIC	03/24/1922	761	SEA	03/30/1922	3M	585	KBUP Olympia, Washington
134	03/30/1922	KQY	Portland	Oregon	Stubbs Electric Company	E	LIC	03/29/1922	761	SEA	03/30/1922	3M	586	deleted 05/03/1923
135	03/30/1922	KMO	Tacoma	Washington	Love Electric Company	E	LIC	03/24/1922	761	SEA	03/30/1922	3M	587	KKMO Tacoma, Washington
136	03/31/1922	KMC	Reedley	California	Lindsay-Weatherill & Company	E	LIC	03/24/1922	761	SF	03/31/1922	3M	588	deleted 09/01/1923
137	03/31/1922	KFI	Los Angeles	California	Earle C. Anthony	E	LIC	--/--/----	TG	OWN	03/31/1922	3M	589	KFI Los Angeles, California
138	03/31/1922	KLN	Monterey	California	Noggle Electric Works	E	LIC	03/24/1922	761	SF	03/31/1922	3M	590	deleted 11/30/1923
139	03/31/1922	KGN	Portland	Oregon	Northwestern Radio Mfg Company	E	LIC	03/24/1922	761	SEA	03/31/1922	3M	591	deleted 06/--/1924 (?)
140	03/31/1922	WWL	New Orleans	Louisiana	Loyola University	E	LIC	03/31/1922	761	NO	03/31/1922	3M	592	WWL New Orleans, Louisiana
141	04/03/1922	WCK	Saint Louis	Missouri	Stix-Baer-Fuller	E	LIC	04/03/1922	761	CHI	04/03/1922	3M	595	deleted 11/30/1928-WSBF
142	04/05/1922	KHD	Colorado Springs	Colorado	C F Aldrich Marble & Granite	M	LIC	04/04/1922	761	CHI	04/05/1922	3M	597	deleted 03/20/1923
143	04/05/1922	WPJ	Philadelphia	Pennsylvania	Saint Joseph's College	E	LIC	04/04/1922	761	BAL	04/05/1922	3M	598	deleted 01/19/1923
144	04/05/1922	WBAA	West Lafayette	Indiana	Purdue University	E	LIC	04/04/1922	761	CHI	04/05/1922	3M	599	WBAA West Lafayette, Indiana
145	04/05/1922	WBL	Anthony	Kansas	T & H Radio Company	E	LIC	04/04/1922	761	CHI	04/05/1922	3M	600	deleted 12/15/1924
146	04/05/1922	KOB	State College	New Mexico	New Mexico College	EM	LIC	04/04/1922	761	NO	04/05/1922	3M	601	KKOB Albuquerque, New Mexico
147	04/05/1922	KNJ	Roswell	New Mexico	Roswell Public Service Company	E	LIC	04/04/1922	761	NO	04/05/1922	3M	602	deleted 11/26/1923
148	04/05/1922	WCE	Minneapolis	Minnesota	Findley Electric Company	E	LIC	04/04/1922	761	CHI	04/05/1922	3M	603	deleted 12/01/1923
149	04/05/1922	WEB	Saint Louis	Missouri	Benwood Company	E	LIC	04/04/1922	761	CHI	04/05/1922	3M	604	deleted 03/20/2020-KZQZ
150	04/05/1922	WMB	Auburn	Maine	Auburn Electrical Company	E	LIC	04/04/1922	761	BOS	04/05/1922	3M	605	deleted 03/21/1923
151	04/05/1922	WDZ	Tuscola	Illinois	James L. Bush	E	LIC	04/04/1922	761	CHI	04/05/1922	3M	606	WDZ Decatur, Illinois
152	04/05/1922	WPE	Kansas City	Missouri	Central Radio Company	E	LIC	04/04/1922	761	CHI	04/05/1922	3M	607	KMBZ Kansas City, Missouri
153	04/06/1922	WSN	Norfolk	Virginia	Ship Owners Radio Service	E	LIC	04/04/1922	761	NOR	04/06/1922	3M	609	deleted 01/16/1923
154	04/06/1922	WJD	Granville	Ohio	Richard H. Howe	E	LIC	04/04/1922	761	DET	04/06/1922	3M	610	deleted 12/07/1925
155	04/06/1922	WPL	Zanesville	Ohio	Fergus Electric Company	E	LIC	04/04/1922	761	DET	04/06/1922	3M	611	deleted 10/23/1922
156	04/06/1922	WMA	Anderson	Indiana	Arrow Radio Laboratories	E	LIC	04/04/1922	761	CHI	04/06/1922	3M	612	deleted 03/01/1923-WEAW
157	04/06/1922	WPI	Clearfield	Pennsylvania	Electric Supply Company	E	LIC	04/04/1922	761	DET	04/06/1922	3M	613	deleted 07/20/1923
158	04/06/1922	WOE	Akron	Ohio	Buckeye Radio Service Company	E	LIC	04/04/1922	761	DET	04/06/1922	3M	614	deleted 07/--/1923 (?)
159	04/06/1922	WTG	Manhattan	Kansas	Kansas State Agricultural College	M	LIC	04/04/1922	761	CHI	04/06/1922	3M	615	deleted 12/19/1925
160	04/07/1922	WAAF	Chicago	Illinois	Union Stock Yards & Transit Co	EM	LIC	04/07/1922	761	CHI	04/07/1922	3M	608	WSFS Chicago, Illinois
161	04/08/1922	KGB	Tacoma	Washington	William A Mullins Electric Company	E	LIC	04/08/1922	761	SEA	04/08/1922	3M	616	deleted 12/11/1925
162	04/10/1922	WAAM	Newark	New Jersey	I. R. Nelson Company	E	LIC	04/08/1922	761	NYC	04/10/1922	3M	617	WBBR New York, New York
163	04/10/1922	WAAJ	Boston	Massachusetts	Eastern Radio Institute	E	LIC	04/08/1922	761	BOS	04/10/1922	3M	618	deleted 05/15/1923
164	04/10/1922	WAAO	Charles Town	West Virginia	Radio Service Company	E	LIC	04/08/1922	761	DET	04/10/1922	3M	619	deleted 12/01/1922
165	04/10/1922	KXS	Los Angeles	California	Braun Corporation	E	LIC	04/08/1922	761	SF	04/10/1922	3M	620	deleted 03/09/1923
166	04/10/1922	WAAH	Saint Paul	Minnesota	Commonwealth Electric Company	E	LIC	04/08/1922	761	CHI	04/10/1922	3M	621	deleted 11/07/1923
167	04/10/1922	KNR	Los Angeles	California	Beacon Light Company	E	LIC	04/08/1922	761	SF	04/10/1922	3M	622	deleted 08/23/1922
168	04/10/1922	KJC	Los Angeles	California	Standard Radio Company	E	LIC	04/08/1922	761	SF	04/10/1922	3M	623	deleted 01/24/1923
169	04/10/1922	KON	San Diego	California	Holzwasser	E	LIC	04/08/1922	761	SF	04/10/1922	3M	625	deleted 03/09/1923
170	04/10/1922	KSS	Long Beach	California	Prest & Dean Radio Research	E	LIC	04/08/1922	761	SF	04/10/1922	3M	626	deleted 04/02/1924
171	04/10/1922	WAAL	Minneapolis	Minnesota	Minn Tribune Co & Anderson-Beamish	E	LIC	04/08/1922	761	CHI	04/10/1922	3M	627	deleted 06/23/1923
172	04/10/1922	KNV	Los Angeles	California	Radio Supply Company	E	LIC	04/08/1922	761	SF	04/10/1922	3M	628	deleted 04/02/1924
173	04/10/1922	KZI	Los Angeles	California	Irving S. Cooper	E	LIC	04/08/1922	761	SF	04/10/1922	3M	629	deleted 08/15/1922
174	04/11/1922	WAAG	Shreveport	Louisiana	Elliott Electric Company	E	LIC	04/11/1922	761	NO	04/11/1922	3M	631	deleted 12/19/1922
175	04/12/1922	KOE	Spokane	Washington	Spokane Chronicle	E	LIC	04/11/1922	761	SEA	04/12/1922	3M	632	deleted 10/07/1922
176	04/12/1922	KOQ	Modesto	California	Modesto Evening News	E	LIC	04/11/1922	761	SF	04/12/1922	3M	633	deleted 09/06/1922
177	04/12/1922	KQP	Hood River	Oregon	Blue Diamond Electric Company	EM	LIC	04/11/1922	761	SEA	04/12/1922	3M	637	KUFO Portland, Oregon
178	04/12/1922	WAAE	Saint Louis	Missouri	Saint Louis Chamber of Commerce	E	LIC	04/11/1922	761	CHI	04/12/1922	3M	639	deleted 09/23/1922
179	04/13/1922	WAAZ	Emporia	Kansas	Hollister-Miller Motor Company	E	LIC	03/11/1922	TG	OWN	04/13/1922	3M	634	deleted 01/28/1924
180	04/13/1922	WAAQ	Greenwich	Connecticut	New England Motor Sales Company	E	LIC	04/13/1922	761	BOS	04/13/1922	3M	635	deleted 05/15/1923
181	04/13/1922	WAAR	Huntington	West Virginia	Groves-Thornton Hardware Company	E	LIC	04/13/1922	761	DET	04/13/1922	3M	636	deleted 12/04/1922
182	04/13/1922	KXD	Modesto	California	Herald Publishing Company	E	LIC	04/12/1922	761	SF	04/13/1922	3M	638	deleted 03/10/1924
183	04/13/1922	WAAK	Milwaukee	Wisconsin	Gimbel Brothers	E	LIC	04/12/1922	761	CHI	04/13/1922	3M	640	deleted 12/01/1923
184	04/13/1922	KUS	Los Angeles	California	City Dye Works & Laundry Company	E	LIC	04/12/1922	761	SF	04/13/1922	3M	641	deleted 04/04/1924
185	04/13/1922	WAAN	Columbia	Missouri	University of Missouri	E	LIC	04/12/1922	761	CHI	04/13/1922	3M	643	deleted 03/16/1925
186	04/13/1922	KWH	Los Angeles	California	Los Angeles Examiner	E	LIC	04/12/1922	761	SF	04/13/1922	3M	644	deleted 03/18/1925
187	04/14/1922	WAAP	Wichita	Kansas	Otto W. Taylor	E	LIC	04/13/1922	761	CHI	04/14/1922	3M	645	deleted 10/15/1923
188	04/17/1922	WAAS	Decatur	Georgia	Georgia Radio Company	E	LIC	04/13/1922	761	NOR	04/17/1922	3M	647	deleted 05/25/1923
189	04/17/1922	WAAB	New Orleans	Louisiana	Times-Picayune	E	LIC	04/04/1922	761	NO	04/17/1922	3M	648	WJBO Baton Rouge, Louisiana
190	04/17/1922	KPO	San Francisco	California	Hale Brothers	E	LIC	04/13/1922	761	SF	04/17/1922	3M	650	KNBR San Francisco, California
191	04/19/1922	WAAV	Athens	Ohio	Athens Radio Company	E	LIC	04/17/1922	761	DET	04/19/1922	3M	654	deleted 12/01/1922
192	04/19/1922	WAAX	Crafton	Pennsylvania	Radio Service Corporation	E	LIC	04/17/1922	761	DET	04/19/1922	3M	655	deleted 01/04/1923
193	04/19/1922	WAAY	Youngstown	Ohio	Yahrling-Rayner Piano Company	E	LIC	04/17/1922	761	DET	04/19/1922	3M	656	deleted 06/12/1923
194	04/19/1922	WAAW	Omaha	Nebraska	Omaha Grain Exchange	E	LIC	04/17/1922	761	CHI	04/19/1922	3M	657	KCRO Omaha, Nebraska
195	04/19/1922	WBAB	Syracuse	New York	Andrew J. Potter	E	LIC	04/17/1922	761	DET	04/19/1922	3M	658	deleted 03/22/1923
196	04/20/1922	KZC	Seattle	Washington	Public Market & Market Stores	E	LIC	04/14/1922	761	SEA	04/20/1922	3M	659	deleted 04/11/1923
197	04/21/1922	KZN	Salt Lake City	Utah	The Deseret News	EM	LIC	04/20/1922	761	SF	04/21/1922	3M	661	KSL Salt Lake City, Utah
198	04/21/1922	WBAG	Bridgeport	Pennsylvania	Diamond State Fibre Company	EM	LIC	04/20/1922	761	BAL	04/21/1922	3M	663	deleted 04/16/1923
199	04/21/1922	WBAH	Minneapolis	Minnesota	The Dayton Company	E	LIC	04/20/1922	761	CHI	04/21/1922	3M	666	deleted 09/05/1924
200	04/21/1922	WBAF	Moorestown	New Jersey	Fred M. Middleton	E	LIC	04/20/1922	761	BAL	04/21/1922	3M	667	deleted 10/05/1923
201	04/21/1922	WBAE	Peoria	Illinois	Bradley Polytechnic Institute	EM	LIC	04/19/1922	761	CHI	04/21/1922	3M	668	deleted 11/01/1922
202	04/22/1922	WBAJ	Toledo	Ohio	Marshall-Gerken Company	E	REL	04/21/1922	761	DET	04/22/1922	3M	271	relicensing of WDZ [37] deleted 01/02/1923
203	04/22/1922	WBAD	Minneapolis	Minnesota	Sterling Elec & Journal Printing	E	LIC	04/19/1922	761	CHI	04/22/1922	3M	664	deleted 04/22/1924
204	04/22/1922	KTW	Seattle	Washington	First Presbyterian Church	E	LIC	04/13/1922	TG	OWN	04/22/1922	3M	665	KKDZ Seattle, Washington
205	04/24/1922	WBAN	Paterson	New Jersey	Wireless Phone Corporation	E	LIC	04/24/1922	761	NYC	04/24/1922	3M	662	deleted 04/10/1925
206	04/24/1922	WAAC	New Orleans	Louisiana	Tulane University	E	LIC	04/05/1922	TG	OWN	04/24/1922	3M	670	deleted 11/25/1925
207	04/24/1922	WBAM	New Orleans	Louisiana	I. B. Rennyson	E	LIC	04/22/1922	761	NO	04/24/1922	3M	671	deleted 10/17/1922
208	04/24/1922	WIZ	Cincinnati	Ohio	Cino Radio Manufacturing Company	EM	LIC	03/18/1922	761	DET	04/24/1922	3M	696	deleted 07/20/1923
209	04/25/1922	KUY	El Monte	California	Coast Radio Company	E	LIC	04/24/1922	761	SF	04/25/1922	3M	672	deleted 09/29/1924
210	04/25/1922	WBAO	Decatur	Illinois	James Millikin University	E	LIC	04/24/1922	761	CHI	04/25/1922	3M	677	WSOY Decatur, Illinois
211	04/25/1922	KNN	Los Angeles	California	Bullock's	E	LIC	04/24/1922	761	SF	04/25/1922	3M	678	deleted 06/07/1923
212	04/26/1922	KSC	San Jose	California	O. A. Hale & Company	E	LIC	04/24/1922	761	SF	04/26/1922	3M	674	deleted 07/06/1922
213	04/26/1922	KYF	San Diego	California	Thearle Music Company	E	LIC	04/25/1922	761	SF	04/26/1922	3M	675	deleted 12/01/1922
214	04/26/1922	KNT	Aberdeen	Washington	North Coast Products Company	E	LIC	04/25/1922	761	SEA	04/26/1922	3M	676	deleted 03/19/1925
215	04/26/1922	WBAP	Fort Worth	Texas	Wortham-Carter Publishing Company	EM	STA	04/26/1922	---	---	05/02/1922	3M	693	WBAP Fort Worth, Texas
216	04/28/1922	WOI	Ames	Iowa	Iowa State College	EM	LIC	03/06/1922	761	CHI	04/28/1922	3M	683	WOI Ames, Iowa
217	04/29/1922	WBAY	New York	New York	American Telephone & Telegraph	E	LIC	04/29/1922	761	NYC	04/29/1922	3M	684	deleted 11/06/1924-WECO
218	04/29/1922	WBAQ	South Bend	Indiana	Myron L. Harmon (YMCA)	E	LIC	04/28/1922	761	CHI	04/29/1922	3M	685	deleted 11/07/1922
219	04/29/1922	WBAV	Columbus	Ohio	Erner & Hopkins Company	E	LIC	04/28/1922	761	DET	04/29/1922	3M	686	WTVN Columbus, Ohio
220	04/29/1922	KNI	Eureka	California	T. W. Smith	E	LIC	04/28/1922	761	SF	04/29/1922	3M	687	deleted 06/16/1923
221	04/29/1922	WBAU	Hamilton	Ohio	Republican Publishing Company	E	LIC	04/28/1922	761	DET	04/29/1922	3M	688	deleted 09/17/1923
222	04/29/1922	WBAW	Marietta	Ohio	Marietta College	E	LIC	04/28/1922	761	DET	04/29/1922	3M	689	deleted 01/21/1924
223	04/29/1922	WBAX	Wilkes-Barre	Pennsylvania	John H. Stenger Junior	E	LIC	04/28/1922	761	---	04/29/1922	3M	690	WFUZ Wilkes-Barre, Pennsylvania
	05/--/1922	WDW [27] Washington, D. C. deleted.												
	05/--/1922	WEH [130] Tulsa, Oklahoma deleted.												
	05/--/1922	WHX [121] Des Moines, Iowa deleted.												
224	05/01/1922	WBAZ	Richmond	Virginia	Times-Dispatch Publishing Company	E	LIC	04/29/1922	761	BAL	05/01/1922	3M	692	deleted 10/18/1922
225	05/01/1922	KOJ	Reno	Nevada	University of Nevada	E	LIC	--/--/----	---	---	05/01/1922	3M	694	deleted 06/07/1922
226	05/03/1922	KLX	Oakland	California	Tribune Publishing Company	E	LIC	05/03/1922	761	SF	05/03/1922	3M	695	KKSF Oakland, California
227	05/03/1922	KZV	Wenatchee	Washington	Wenatchee Battery & Motor Co	E	LIC	05/03/1922	761	SEA	05/03/1922	3M	696	deleted 06/--/1924
228	05/03/1922	WCAB	Newburgh	New York	Newburgh News Print & Publish Co	E	LIC	05/03/1922	761	NYC	05/03/1922	3M	697	deleted 06/15/1923
229	05/03/1922	WCAE	Pittsburgh	Pennsylvania	Kaufman & Baer Company	E	LIC	05/03/1922	761	DET	05/03/1922	3M	698	WPGP Pittsburgh, Pennsylvania
230	05/04/1922	KYI	Bakersfield	California	Alfred Harrell	E	LIC	05/03/1922	761	SF	05/04/1922	3M	354	deleted 05/01/1923
231	05/04/1922	WCAC	Fort Smith	Arkansas	John Fink Jewelry Company	E	LIC	05/03/1922	761	NO	05/04/1922	3M	355	deleted 06/12/1923
232	05/04/1922	KQI	Berkeley	California	University of California	E	LIC	05/04/1922	761	SF	05/04/1922	3M	357	deleted 12/10/1923
233	05/04/1922	KNX	Los Angeles	California	Electric Lighting Supply Company	E	REL	05/04/1922	761	SF	05/04/1922	3M	358	KNX Los Angeles, California
234	05/04/1922	WCAD	Canton	New York	Saint Lawrence University	E	LIC	05/03/1922	761	DET	05/04/1922	3M	359	deleted 06/03/1941
235	05/04/1922	WCX	Detroit	Michigan	Detroit Free Press	EM	LIC	05/04/1922	761	DET	05/04/1922	3M	699	WJR Detroit, Michigan
236	05/04/1922	WCAG	New Orleans	Louisiana	Daily States Publishing Company	E	LIC	05/04/1922	761	NO	05/04/1922	3M	700	deleted 07/15/1925
	05/05/1922	WPB [33] Pittsburgh, Pennsylvania deleted.												
237	05/06/1922	WCAJ	University Place	Nebraska	Nebraska Wesleyan University	EM	LIC	05/06/1922	761	CHI	05/06/1922	3M	360	deleted 08/01/1933
238	05/06/1922	WCAK	Houston	Texas	Alfred P. Daniel	E	LIC	05/06/1922	761	NO	05/06/1922	3M	362	deleted 01/10/1925
239	05/06/1922	WCAL	Northfield	Minnesota	Saint Olaf College	E	LIC	05/06/1922	761	CHI	05/06/1922	3M	363	deleted 12/16/1991
240	05/08/1922	WCAN	Jacksonville	Florida	Southeastern Radio Telephone	E	LIC	05/08/1922	761	BAL	05/08/1922	3M	361	deleted 10/26/1922
241	05/08/1922	WCAM	Villanova	Pennsylvania	Villanova College	E	LIC	05/06/1922	761	BAL	05/08/1922	3M	364	deleted 06/10/1924
242	05/08/1922	WCAP	Decatur	Illinois	Central Radio Service	E	LIC	05/08/1922	761	OWN	05/08/1922	3M	365	deleted 03/05/1923
243	05/08/1922	WCAO	Baltimore	Maryland	Sanders & Stayman Company	E	LIC	05/06/1922	761	BAL	05/08/1922	3M	366	WCAO Baltimore, Maryland
244	05/08/1922	KDYL	Salt Lake City	Utah	Telegram Publishing Company	E	LIC	05/08/1922	761	SF	05/08/1922	3M	453	KNIT Salt Lake City, Utah
245	05/09/1922	WCAT	Rapid City	South Dakota	South Dakota State School of Mines	M	LIC	05/08/1922	761	CHI	05/09/1922	3M	371	deleted 10/28/1952
246	05/09/1922	KDYO	San Diego	California	Carlson & Simpson	E	LIC	05/08/1922	761	SF	05/09/1922	3M	372	deleted 01/24/1923
247	05/09/1922	WCAQ	Defiance	Ohio	Tri-State Radio Mfg & Supply	E	LIC	05/08/1922	761	DET	05/09/1922	3M	373	deleted 03/--/1923 (?)
248	05/09/1922	WCAR	San Antonio	Texas	Alamo Radio Electric Company	E	LIC	05/08/1922	761	NO	05/09/1922	3M	374	KTSA San Antonio, Texas
249	05/09/1922	WCAS	Minneapolis	Minnesota	William Hood Dunwoody Institute	E	LIC	05/08/1922	761	CHI	05/09/1922	3M	375	deleted 09/04/1931-WHDI
250	05/09/1922	KDYQ	Portland	Oregon	Oregon Institute of Technology	M	LIC	05/08/1922	761	SEA	05/09/1922	3M	376	deleted 01/23/1925
251	05/10/1922	WCAU	Philadelphia	Pennsylvania	Philadelphia Radiophone Company	E	LIC	05/10/1922	761	PHI	05/10/1922	3M	367	WPHT Philadelphia, Pennsylvania
252	05/10/1922	KDYN	Redwood City	California	Great Western Radio Corporation	E	LIC	05/08/1922	761	SF	05/10/1922	3M	368	deleted 11/08/1922
253	05/10/1922	KDYM	San Diego	California	Savoy Theatre	E	LIC	05/08/1922	761	SF	05/10/1922	3M	369	deleted 03/19/1925
254	05/10/1922	KDYR	Pasadena	California	Pasadena Star-News Publishing	E	LIC	05/10/1922	761	SF	05/10/1922	3M	370	deleted 12/01/1922
255	05/10/1922	WHB	Kansas City	Missouri	Sweeny School Company	EM	LIC	04/21/1922	RES	OWN	05/10/1922	3M	397	WHB Kansas City, Missouri
256	05/13/1922	KDYS	Great Falls	Montana	The Tribune	E	LIC	05/13/1922	761	SEA	05/13/1922	3M	377	deleted 11/30/1923
257	05/13/1922	WAAD	Cincinnati	Ohio	Ohio Mechanics Institute	E	LIC	04/06/1922	TG	OWN	05/13/1922	3M	383	deleted 06/15/1929
258	05/13/1922	WCAW	Quincy	Illinois	Quincy Herald & Quincy Electric	E	LIC	05/13/1922	761	CHI	05/13/1922	3M	384	deleted 06/23/1923
259	05/13/1922	WCAX	Burlington	Vermont	University of Vermont	E	LIC	05/13/1922	761	BOS	05/13/1922	3M	385	WVMT Burlington, VT
260	05/13/1922	WCAV	Little Rock	Arkansas	J. C. Dice Electric Company	E	LIC	05/13/1922	761	NO	05/13/1922	3M	386	deleted 03/11/1925
261	05/13/1922	KDYU	Klamath Falls	Oregon	Herald Publishing Company	E	LIC	05/13/1922	761	SEA	05/13/1922	3M	387	deleted 11/01/1922
262	05/13/1922	KDYV	Salt Lake City	Utah	Cope & Cornwell Company	E	LIC	05/13/1922	761	SF	05/13/1922	3M	388	deleted 03/15/1923
263	05/13/1922	WCAH	Columbus	Ohio	Entrekin Electric Company	E	?TG	05/05/1922	TG	OWN	06/12/1922	3M	470	WBNS Columbus, Ohio
264	05/15/1922	WDAE	Tampa	Florida	Tampa Daily Times	EM	LIC	05/15/1922	761	BAL	05/15/1922	3M	379	WHNZ Tampa, Florida
265	05/15/1922	KDYW	Phoenix	Arizona	Smith Hughes & Company	E	LIC	05/15/1922	761	SF	05/15/1922	3M	380	deleted 04/04/1924
266	05/15/1922	WCAY	Milwaukee	Wisconsin	Kesselman O'Driscoll Company	E	LIC	05/15/1922	761	CHI	05/15/1922	3M	389	WTMJ Milwaukee, Wisconsin
267	05/15/1922	WDAA	Nashville	Tennessee	Ward-Belmont School	E	LIC	05/15/1922	761	NO	05/15/1922	3M	390	deleted 11/04/1922
268	05/15/1922	WDAB	Portsmouth	Ohio	H. C. Summers & Son	E	LIC	05/15/1922	761	DET	05/15/1922	3M	391	deleted 10/23/1922
269	05/15/1922	WDAC	Springfield	Illinois	Illinois Watch Company	M	LIC	05/15/1922	761	CHI	05/15/1922	3M	392	deleted 05/05/1923
270	05/15/1922	WCAZ	Quincy	Illinois	R E Compton & Quincy Whig-General	E	LIC	05/15/1922	761	CHI	05/15/1922	3M	393	deleted 04/21/2017
271	05/15/1922	WDAD	Lindsborg	Kansas	William L. Harrison	E	LIC	05/15/1922	761	CHI	05/15/1922	3M	394	deleted 11/07/1923
272	05/16/1922	WDAI	Syracuse	New York	Hughes Electrical Corporation	E	LIC	05/16/1922	761	DET	05/16/1922	3M	381	deleted 11/19/1923
273	05/16/1922	WDAF	Kansas City	Missouri	Kansas City Star	E	LIC	05/16/1922	761	CHI	05/16/1922	3M	382	KFNZ Kansas City, Missouri
274	05/16/1922	WDAG	Amarillo	Texas	J. Laurance Martin	E	LIC	05/16/1922	761	NO	05/16/1922	3M	395	KGNC Amarillo, Texas
275	05/16/1922	WDAH	El Paso	Texas	Mine & Smelter Supply Company	E	LIC	05/16/1922	761	NO	05/16/1922	3M	396	deleted 10/01/1940
276	05/18/1922	WDAJ	College Park	Georgia	Atlanta & West Point Railroad	E	LIC	05/17/1922	761	BAL	05/18/1922	3M	399	deleted 09/10/1923
277	05/18/1922	KDYY	Denver	Colorado	Rocky Mountain Radio Corp	E	LIC	05/17/1922	761	CHI	05/18/1922	3M	400	deleted 03/--/1923
278	05/19/1922	WDAM	New York	New York	Western Electric Company	E	LIC	05/18/1922	761	NYC	05/19/1922	3M	401	WFAN New York, New York
279	05/19/1922	KDZA	Tucson	Arizona	Arizona Daily Star	E	LIC	05/18/1922	761	SF	05/19/1922	3M	403	deleted 04/12/1923
280	05/19/1922	WDAN	Shreveport	Louisiana	Glenwood Radio Corporation	E	LIC	05/18/1922	761	NO	05/19/1922	3M	404	KEEL Shreveport, Louisiana
281	05/19/1922	WDAO	Dallas	Texas	Automotive Electric Company	E	LIC	05/18/1922	761	NO	05/19/1922	3M	405	deleted 06/--/1924
282	05/19/1922	WDAP	Chicago	Illinois	Mid West Radio Central Inc	E	LIC	05/19/1922	761	CHI	05/19/1922	3M	406	WGN Chicago, Illinois
283	05/19/1922	WDAL	Jacksonville	Florida	Florida Times-Union	EM	LIC	05/18/1922	761	BAL	05/19/1922	3M	409	deleted 12/22/1923
	05/19/1922	WGM [88] Atlanta, Georgia deleted.												
284	05/20/1922	KDZB	Bakersfield	California	Frank E. Siefert	E	LIC	05/19/1922	761	SF	05/20/1922	3M	402	deleted 02/12/1926
285	05/20/1922	WDAQ	Brownsville	Pennsylvania	Hartman-Riker Elec & Machine Co	E	LIC	05/19/1922	761	DET	05/20/1922	3M	407	deleted 01/22/1923
286	05/20/1922	WDAR	Philadelphia	Pennsylvania	Lit Brothers	E	LIC	05/19/1922	761	BAL	05/20/1922	3M	408	WFIL Philadelphia, Pennsylvania
287	05/22/1922	WDAS	Worcester	Massachusetts	Samuel A. Waite	E	LIC	05/20/1922	761	BOS	05/22/1922	3M	411	deleted 01/03/1925
288	05/22/1922	WDAU	New Bedford	Massachusetts	Slocum & Kilburn	E	LIC	05/20/1922	761	BOS	05/22/1922	3M	412	deleted 11/18/1924
289	05/22/1922	WDAK	Hartford	Connecticut	The Courant	E	LIC	05/17/1922	TG	OWN	05/22/1922	3M	413	deleted 07/30/1924
290	05/22/1922	WDAT	Worcester	Massachusetts	deletedta Electric Company	E	LIC	05/20/1922	761	BOS	05/22/1922	3M	414	deleted 10/05/1922
291	05/22/1922	WDAW	Atlanta	Georgia	Georgia Railway & Power Company	EM	LIC	05/20/1922	761	NOR	05/22/1922	3M	682	deleted 11/06/1922
292	05/23/1922	KDZE	Seattle	Washington	The Rhodes Company	E	LIC	05/23/1922	761	SF	05/23/1922	3M	417	KKOL Seattle, Washington
293	05/23/1922	WDAY	Fargo	North Dakota	Kenneth M. Hance	EM	LIC	05/22/1922	761	CHI	05/23/1922	3M	418	WDAY Fargo, North Dakota
294	05/23/1922	KDZD	Los Angeles	California	W. R. Mitchell	E	LIC	05/22/1922	761	SF	05/23/1922	3M	419	deleted 11/08/1922
295	05/23/1922	WDAV	Muskogee	Oklahoma	Muskogee Daily Phoenix	E	LIC	05/22/1922	761	NO	05/23/1922	3M	420	deleted 01/15/1923
296	05/23/1922	WDAX	Centerville	Iowa	First National Bank	E	LIC	05/22/1922	761	CHI	05/23/1922	3M	421	deleted 01/03/1924
297	05/25/1922	WEAE	Blacksburg	Virginia	Virginia Polytechnic Institute	E	?	05/24/1922	761	---	--/--/----	---	---	deleted 03/01/1923
298	05/25/1922	KDZF	Los Angeles	California	Automobile Club of Southern Calif	E	LIC	05/24/1922	761	SF	05/25/1922	3M	423	deleted 04/04/1924
299	05/25/1922	WEAC	Terre Haute	Indiana	Baines Electric Service Company	E	LIC	05/24/1922	761	CHI	05/25/1922	3M	424	deleted 03/05/1923
300	05/25/1922	WEAD	Atwood	Kansas	Northwest Kansas Radio Supply	E	LIC	05/24/1922	761	CHI	05/25/1922	3M	425	deleted 08/13/1923
301	05/25/1922	WEAA	Flint	Michigan	Fallain & Lathrop	E	LIC	05/24/1922	761	DET	05/25/1922	3M	426	WFDF Farmington Hills, Michigan
302	05/25/1922	KDZG	San Francisco	California	Cyrus Peirce & Company	E	LIC	05/24/1922	761	SF	05/25/1922	3M	427	deleted 06/16/1923
303	05/25/1922	WEAB	Fort Dodge	Iowa	Standard Radio Equipment Company	E	LIC	05/24/1922	761	CHI	05/25/1922	3M	428	deleted 10/30/1923
304	05/25/1922	KDZH	Fresno	California	Fresno Evening Herald	E	LIC	05/24/1922	761	SF	05/25/1922	3M	442	deleted 05/16/1923
305	05/26/1922	WEAH	Wichita	Kansas	Wichita Brd of Trade & Lander Radio	EM	LIC	05/25/1922	761	---	05/26/1922	3M	429	KNSS Wichita, Kansas
306	05/26/1922	KDZI	Wenatchee	Washington	Electric Supply Company	E	LIC	05/25/1922	761	SEA	05/26/1922	3M	430	deleted 07/18/1924
307	05/26/1922	KDZJ	Eugene	Oregon	Excelsior Radio Company	E	LIC	05/25/1922	761	SEA	05/26/1922	3M	431	deleted 11/02/1922
308	05/27/1922	WEAJ	Vermillion	South Dakota	University of South Dakota	E	AUT	05/26/1922	TG	OWN	02/06/1923	3M	---	deleted 08/11/1994-KUSD
309	05/27/1922	WEAI	Ithaca	New York	Cornell University	E	LIC	05/26/1922	761	DET	05/27/1922	3M	432	WHCU Ithaca, New York
310	05/29/1922	KDZM	Centralia	Washington	E. A. Hollingworth	E	LIC	05/28/1922	761	SEA	05/29/1922	3M	434	deleted 03/12/1923
311	05/29/1922	WEAG	Edgewood	Rhode Island	Nichols-Hineline-Bassett Laboratory	E	LIC	05/25/1922	761	BOS	05/29/1922	3M	437	deleted 11/12/1923
312	05/29/1922	KDZK	Reno	Nevada	Nevada Machinery & Electric Company	E	LIC	05/27/1922	761	SF	05/29/1922	3M	438	deleted 11/30/1923
313	05/29/1922	KDZL	Ogden	Utah	Rocky Mountain Radio Corporation	E	LIC	05/27/1922	761	SF	05/29/1922	3M	439	deleted 03/13/1923
314	05/31/1922	KDZR	Bellingham	Washington	Bellingham Publishing Company	E	LIC	05/31/1922	761	SF	05/31/1922	3M	435	deleted 12/20/1924
315	05/31/1922	WEAK	Saint Joseph	Missouri	Julius B. Abercrombie	E	LIC	05/31/1922	761	CHI	05/31/1922	3M	436	deleted 09/26/1923
316	05/31/1922	KDZP	Los Angeles	California	Newberry Electric Corporation	E	LIC	05/31/1922	761	SF	05/31/1922	3M	440	deleted 01/24/1923
317	05/31/1922	KDZQ	Denver	Colorado	Motor Generator Company	E	LIC	05/31/1922	761	CHI	05/31/1922	3M	441	deleted 05/29/1924
318	05/31/1922	KDYX	Honolulu	Hawaii	Star Bulletin	E	LIC	05/16/1922	TG	OWN	05/31/1922	3M	442	deleted 06/17/1924
319	05/31/1922	WEAM	North Plainfield	New Jersey	Borough of North Plainfield	E	LIC	05/31/1922	761	BAL	05/31/1922	3M	443	deleted 12/21/1928
320	06/02/1922	WEAN	Providence	Rhode Island	Shepard Company	E	TG	06/02/1922	761	---	06/05/1922	---	454	WPRV Providence, Rhode Island
321	06/03/1922	WEAR	Baltimore	Maryland	Baltimore American & News Publish	E	LIC	06/03/1922	761	BAL	06/03/1922	3M	444	deleted 10/27/1924
322	06/03/1922	WEAV	Rushville	Nebraska	Sheridan Electric Service Company	E	LIC	06/03/1922	761	CHI	06/03/1922	3M	445	deleted 06/23/1923
323	06/03/1922	WEAT	Tampa	Florida	John Joseph Fogarty	E	LIC	06/03/1922	761	BAL	06/03/1922	3M	446	deleted 05/03/1923
324	06/03/1922	WEAO	Columbus	Ohio	Ohio State University	EM	LIC	06/03/1922	761	DET	06/03/1922	3M	447	WVSG Columbus, Ohio
325	06/03/1922	WEAQ	Berlin	New Hampshire	Young Men's Christian Association	E	LIC	06/03/1922	761	BOS	06/03/1922	3M	448	deleted 09/06/1922
326	06/03/1922	WEAU	Sioux City	Iowa	Davidson Brothers Company	E	LIC	06/03/1922	761	CHI	06/03/1922	3M	449	deleted 04/28/1927
327	06/03/1922	KDZU	Denver	Colorado	Western Radio Corporation	E	LIC	06/03/1922	761	CHI	06/03/1922	3M	450	deleted 09/01/1925-KFAF
328	06/03/1922	WEAS	Washington	D. C.	Hecht Company	E	LIC	06/03/1922	761	BAL	06/03/1922	3M	451	deleted 03/18/1924
329	06/03/1922	WEAP	Mobile	Alabama	Mobile Radio Company	E	LIC	06/03/1922	761	NO	06/03/1922	3M	452	deleted 03/31/1925
330	06/05/1922	WFAA	Dallas	Texas	A. H. Belo & Company	EM	LIC	06/05/1922	761	NO	06/05/1922	---	456	KLIF Dallas, Texas
	06/05/1922	WGH [39] Montgomery, Alabama deleted.												
331	06/06/1922	WEAZ	Waterloo	Iowa	Donald Redmond	E	LIC	06/05/1922	761	CHI	06/06/1922	3M	455	deleted 11/27/1922
332	06/06/1922	WEAY	Houston	Texas	Will Horwitz Jr.	E	LIC	06/05/1922	761	NO	06/06/1922	3M	457	deleted 10/24/1925
333	06/06/1922	WEAX	Little Rock	Arkansas	Thomas J. M. Daly	EM	LIC	06/05/1922	761	NO	06/06/1922	3M	458	deleted 06/11/1923
334	06/06/1922	WFAB	Syracuse	New York	Carl Frank Woese	E	LIC	06/05/1922	761	DET	06/06/1922	3M	459	deleted 10/09/1924
335	06/07/1922	KDZX	San Francisco	California	Glad Tidings Tabernacle	E	LIC	06/06/1922	761	SF	06/07/1922	---	463	deleted 06/16/1923
336	06/07/1922	KDZW	San Francisco	California	Claude W. Gerdes	E	LIC	06/06/1922	761	SF	06/07/1922	3M	464	deleted 01/08/1923
	06/07/1922	KOJ [225] Reno, Nevada deleted.												
337	06/08/1922	WFAD	Salina	Kansas	Watson Weldon Motor Supply Company	E	LIC	06/08/1922	761	CHI	06/08/1922	3M	460	deleted 03/08/1923
338	06/08/1922	WFAC	Superior	Wisconsin	Superior Radio Company	E	LIC	06/08/1922	761	CHI	06/08/1922	3M	461	deleted 06/23/1923
339	06/08/1922	WFAF	Poughkeepsie	New York	H. C. Spratley Company	E	LIC	06/08/1922	761	NYC	06/08/1922	3M	462	deleted 06/--/1924
340	06/09/1922	WFAH	Port Arthur	Texas	Electric Supply Company	E	LIC	06/09/1922	761	NO	06/09/1922	3M	465	deleted 08/27/1924
341	06/09/1922	WFAJ	Asheville	North Carolina	Hi-Grade Wireless Instrument	E	LIC	06/09/1922	761	BAL	06/09/1922	3M	466	deleted 06/10/1924
342	06/09/1922	WFAG	Waterford	New York	Radio Engineering Laboratory	E	LIC	06/08/1922	761	DET	06/09/1922	3M	467	deleted 07/20/1923
	06/09/1922	KQL [7] Los Angeles, California deleted.												
343	06/10/1922	WFAK	Brentwood	Missouri	Domestic Electric Company	E	LIC	06/09/1922	761	---	06/10/1922	3M	468	deleted 09/--/1922
344	06/12/1922	KDZZ	Everett	Washington	Kinney Brothers & Sipprell	E	LIC	06/01/1922	761	SEA	06/12/1922	3M	469	deleted 04/23/1923
345	06/12/1922	WFAL	Houston	Texas	Houston Chronicle Publishing	EM	LIC	06/12/1922	761	NO	06/12/1922	3M	483	deleted 11/17/1922
346	06/13/1922	WFAR	Sanford	Maine	Hall & Stubbs	E	LIC	06/13/1922	761	BOS	06/13/1922	3M	472	deleted 12/16/1922
347	06/13/1922	WFAP	Peoria	Illinois	Brown's Business College	E	LIC	06/12/1922	761	CHI	06/13/1922	3M	479	deleted 11/27/1922
348	06/13/1922	WFAN	Hutchinson	Minnesota	Hutchinson Electric Service Company	EM	LIC	06/12/1922	761	CHI	06/13/1922	3M	480	deleted 01/07/1925
349	06/13/1922	WFAM	Saint Cloud	Minnesota	Times Publishing Company	E	LIC	06/12/1922	761	CHI	06/13/1922	3M	481	deleted 08/01/1928
350	06/14/1922	WFAS	Fort Wayne	Indiana	United Radio Corporation	E	LIC	06/14/1922	761	CHI	06/14/1922	3M	475	deleted 03/01/1923
351	06/14/1922	WGAB	Houston	Texas	QRV Radio Company	E	LIC	06/13/1922	761	NO	06/14/1922	3M	476	deleted 03/23/1923
352	06/14/1922	WFAT	Sioux Falls	South Dakota	Daily Argus-Leader	E	LIC	06/14/1922	761	CHI	06/14/1922	3M	477	deleted 06/13/1924
353	06/14/1922	WFAQ	Cameron	Missouri	Missouri Wesleyan Coll& Cameron Rad	E	LIC	06/14/1922	761	CHI	06/14/1922	3M	478	deleted 06/13/1924
354	06/14/1922	KFAB	Portland	Oregon	Pacific Radiofone Company	E	LIC	06/13/1922	761	SEA	06/14/1922	3M	482	deleted 11/09/1922
355	06/14/1922	WEH	Tulsa	Oklahoma	Midland Refining Company	EM	REL	--/--/----	761	NO	06/14/1922	3M	581	deleted 06/11/1923
356	06/16/1922	WFAW	Miami	Florida	Miami Daily Metropolis	E	LIC	06/16/1922	761	BAL	06/16/1922	3M	487	deleted 06/11/1923
357	06/16/1922	WFAU	Boston	Massachusetts	Edwin C. Lewis	E	LIC	06/16/1922	761	BOS	06/16/1922	3M	488	deleted 05/15/1923
358	06/16/1922	WFAV	Lincoln	Nebraska	University of Nebraska	EM	LIC	06/16/1922	761	CHI	06/16/1922	3M	489	deleted 04/30/1927
359	06/16/1922	KFAC	Glendale	California	Glendale Daily Press	E	LIC	06/16/1922	761	SF	06/16/1922	3M	490	deleted 01/24/1923
360	06/17/1922	WFAZ	Charleston	South Carolina	South Carolina Radio Shop	E	LIC	06/17/1922	761	BAL	06/17/1922	3M	486	deleted 06/11/1923
361	06/17/1922	WFAY	Independence	Kansas	Daniels Radio Supply Company	E	LIC	06/17/1922	761	CHI	06/17/1922	3M	491	deleted 04/09/1923
362	06/17/1922	WFAX	Binghamton	New York	Arthur L. Kent	E	LIC	06/17/1922	761	DET	06/17/1922	3M	492	deleted 11/03/1922
363	06/19/1922	WGAC	Brooklyn	New York	Orpheum Radio Stores Company	E	LIC	06/17/1922	761	NYC	06/19/1922	3M	484	deleted 09/16/1922
364	06/19/1922	WGAD	Ensenada	Puerto Rico	Spanish-Amer Sch Radio-telegraphy	E	LIC	06/19/1922	761	BAL	06/19/1922	3M	485	deleted 05/22/1923
365	06/19/1922	WGAF	Tulsa	Oklahoma	Goller Radio Service	E	LIC	06/19/1922	761	NO	06/19/1922	3M	494	deleted 11/20/1922
	06/20/1922	KGC [14] Hollywood, California deleted (was relicensed 05/04/1922 as KNX [233] Los Angeles, California)												
366	06/21/1922	KFAD	Phoenix	Arizona	McArthur Brothers Mercantile	E	LIC	06/21/1922	761	SF	06/21/1922	3M	495	KTAR Phoenix, Arizona
367	06/21/1922	KFAE	Pullman	Washington	State College of Washington	E	LIC	06/21/1922	761	SEA	06/21/1922	3M	496	KWSU Pullman, Washington
368	06/22/1922	WGAH	New Haven	Connecticut	New Haven Electric Company	E	LIC	06/21/1922	761	BOS	06/22/1922	3M	497	deleted 05/15/1923
369	06/23/1922	WGAJ	Shenandoah	Iowa	W. H. Gass	E	LIC	06/22/1922	761	CHI	06/23/1922	3M	500	deleted 05/21/1923
370	06/24/1922	WGAK	Macon	Georgia	Macon Electric Company	E	?	06/23/1922	761	---	06/24/1922	---	---	deleted 04/16/1923
371	06/24/1922	WGAM	Orangeburg	South Carolina	Orangeburg Radio Equipment Company	E	LIC	06/23/1922	761	BAL	06/24/1922	3M	501	deleted 06/14/1923
372	06/24/1922	WGAL	Lancaster	Pennsylvania	Lancaster Elec Supply & Construction	E	LIC	06/23/1922	761	BAL	06/24/1922	---	502	WRKY Lancaster, Pennsylvania
373	06/24/1922	WGAN	Pensacola	Florida	Cecil E. Lloyd	E	LIC	06/23/1922	761	BAL	06/24/1922	3M	503	deleted 11/06/1924
374	06/26/1922	WGAR	Fort Smith	Arkansas	Southwest American	E	LIC	06/26/1922	761	NO	06/26/1922	3M	505	deleted 11/26/1923
375	06/26/1922	WGAQ	Shreveport	Louisiana	W. G. Patterson (Glenwood Radio)	E	REL	--/--/----	761	NO	06/26/1922	3M	506	KEEL Shreveport, Louisiana
376	06/26/1922	WHAA	Iowa City	Iowa	State University of Iowa	E	LIC	06/24/1922	761	CHI	06/26/1922	3M	507	WSUI Iowa City, Iowa
377	06/26/1922	WGAT	Lincoln	Nebraska	American Legion (Dept of Nebraska)	E	LIC	06/26/1922	761	CHI	06/26/1922	3M	508	deleted 04/09/1923
378	06/26/1922	WGAS	Chicago	Illinois	Ray-Di-Co Organization	E	LIC	06/26/1922	761	CHI	06/26/1922	3M	509	deleted 01/06/1923
379	06/27/1922	WGAU	Wooster	Ohio	Marcus G. Limb	E	LIC	06/26/1922	761	DET	06/27/1922	3M	510	deleted 11/27/1923
380	06/28/1922	WGAY	Madison	Wisconsin	Northwestern Radio Company	E	LIC	06/28/1922	761	CHI	06/28/1922	3M	512	deleted 01/03/1924
381	06/29/1922	WHAB	Galveston	Texas	Clark W Thompson (Fellman's)	EM	LIC	06/29/1922	761	NO	06/29/1922	3M	511	deleted 06/--/1924
382	06/29/1922	WGAZ	South Bend	Indiana	South Bend Tribune	E	LIC	06/28/1922	761	CHI	06/29/1922	3M	513	WSBT South Bend, Indiana
383	06/30/1922	KFAJ	Boulder	Colorado	University of Colorado	E	LIC	06/28/1922	761	CHI	06/30/1922	3M	514	deleted 01/28/1926
384	06/30/1922	WHAF	Pittsburgh	Pennsylvania	Radio Electric Company	E	LIC	06/30/1922	761	DET	06/30/1922	3M	515	deleted 02/20/1923
385	06/30/1922	WGAW	Altoona	Pennsylvania	Ernest C. Albright	E	LIC	06/27/1922	761	BAL	06/30/1922	3M	516	deleted 07/19/1924
386	06/30/1922	WGAV	Savannah	Georgia	B-H Radio Company	E	LIC	06/27/1922	761	BAL	06/30/1922	3M	517	deleted 10/11/1922
387	06/30/1922	WHAC	Waterloo	Iowa	Cole Brothers Electric Company	E	LIC	06/30/1922	761	CHI	06/30/1922	3M	518	deleted 12/13/1923
388	06/30/1922	WHAE	Sioux City	Iowa	Automotive Electric Service Company	E	LIC	06/30/1922	761	CHI	06/30/1922	3M	519	deleted 06/23/1923
389	06/30/1922	WHAD	Milwaukee	Wisconsin	Marquette University	E	LIC	06/30/1922	761	CHI	06/30/1922	3M	520	deleted 05/29/1934

Table Summary
Month		New	Delete	Change	Active
1921	Sep	*4	--	4	4
	Oct	3	--	3	7
	Nov	**2	--	2	9
	Dec	20	--	20	29
1922	Jan	9	--	9	38
	Feb	23	--	23	61
	Mar	79	2	77	138
	Apr	83	--	83	221
	May	96	5	91	312
	Jun	70	4	66	378
*includes WJZ **includes KDKA

== See also ==
- List of temporary broadcasting stations in the United States
- List of AM-band radio station lists issued by the United States government
