= WEY (AM) =

Radio station in Wichita, Kansas (1922-1923)

WEY was a short-lived American AM radio station in Wichita, Kansas. First licensed on March 23, 1922, it was the first broadcasting station authorized in the state. It was deleted in June 1923.

== History ==
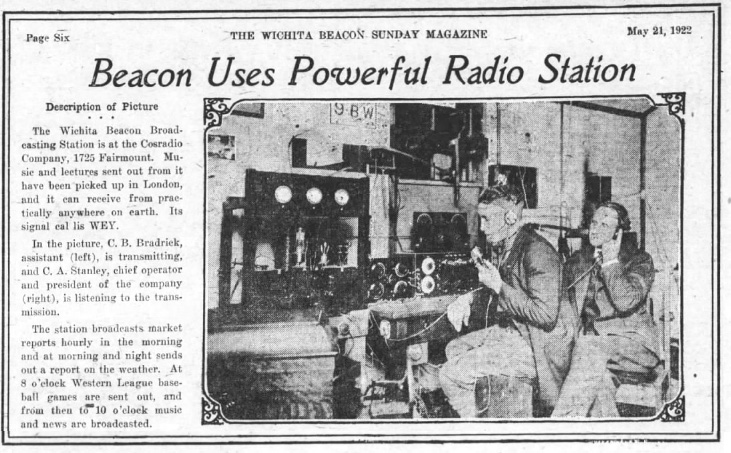
May 21, 1922 station article.

The US Department of Commerce regulated radio stations in the United States from 1912 until the 1927 formation of the Federal Radio Commission. Originally there were no restrictions on which radio stations could make broadcasts intended for the general public. However, effective December 1, 1921, a regulation was adopted limiting broadcasting to stations operating under a Limited Commercial license that authorized operation on designated wavelengths of 360 meters (833 kHz) for "entertainment", and 485 meters (619 kHz) for "market and weather reports".

WEY was first licensed on March 23, 1922, to the Cosradio Company, for operation on both wavelengths. The call sign was randomly issued from a list of available call letters. Currently most stations west of the Mississippi River have call letters beginning with "K". However, prior to the January 1923 establishment of the Mississippi River as the boundary, call letters beginning with "W" were generally assigned to stations east of an irregular line formed by the western state borders from North Dakota south to Texas, with calls beginning with "K" going only to stations in states west of that line. Because there was only a single "entertainment" wavelength, WEY was required to establish a time sharing agreement with any other local stations broadcasting on 360 meters. Later that year, the station was also authorized to broadcast on the 485 meter "market and weather" wavelength. Most of the programming was arranged by a local newspaper, the Wichita Beacon.

The December 17, 1922 issue of the Wichita Beacon reported that: "The Beacon Broadcasting Service, radio station W E Y, was discontinued Friday for an indefinite period." because "the greatest service has already been accomplished. Unless there are new developments in the field of radio, the service will not be resumed." The station never resumed broadcasting, and was deleted on June 23, 1923.

== See also ==
- List of initial AM-band station grants in the United States
