= WCAN (AM) =

Radio station in Jacksonville, Florida

WCAN was an AM radio station in Jacksonville, Florida, licensed to the Southeastern Radio Telephone Company beginning May 8, 1922, and deleted on October 26, 1922. It was the first broadcasting station licensed in the state of Florida.

== History ==
On December 1, 1921, the U.S. Department of Commerce, which regulated radio at this time, adopted the first regulations formally establishing a broadcasting station category, which set aside the wavelength of 360 meters (833 kHz) for entertainment broadcasts, and 485 meters (619 kHz) for market and weather reports. WCAN was the first Florida broadcasting station to receive a license under the new regulations, issued for operation on the 360 meter "entertainment" wavelength on May 8, 1922, to the Southeastern Radio Telephone Company in Jacksonville. The call letters were randomly assigned from a sequential roster of available call signs.

After a series of test transmissions, WCAN made its formal debut broadcast at 7:45 p.m. on the evening of May 17, publicized by a local newspaper, the Florida Times-Union.

In July 1922, a listener reported receiving WCAN in Gulfport, Florida, and the next month the station was heard in Tuinucu, Cuba, at a distance of 550 miles (890 km).

WCAN was deleted on October 26, 1922.

== See also ==
- List of initial AM-band station grants in the United States
