= WPO (AM) =

Radio station in Memphis, Tennessee (1922–1923)

WPO was a short-lived AM radio station, located in Memphis, Tennessee. First licensed on March 28, 1922, it was the second broadcasting station authorized in the state. WPO ceased operations in December 1922, and was deleted the following June.

== History ==
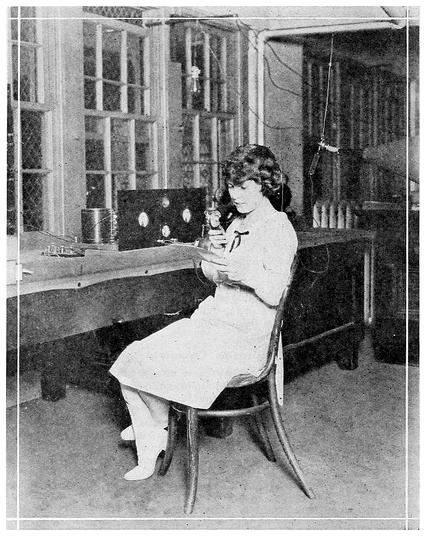
As half of WPO's two person staff, Gwen Wagner was the "radio editor, program director, studio manager, chief announcer and general roustabout".

The Department of Commerce regulated radio stations in the United States from 1912 until the 1927 formation of the Federal Radio Commission. Originally there were no restrictions on which radio stations could make broadcasts intended for the general public. However, effective December 1, 1921, a regulation was adopted limiting broadcasting to stations operating under a Limited Commercial license that authorized operation on designated wavelengths of 360 meters (833 kHz) for "entertainment", and 485 meters (619 kHz) for "market and weather reports". WPO was first licensed on March 28, 1922, to the United Equipment Company in Memphis, Tennessee, for operation on 360 meters. The call sign was randomly issued from a roster of available call letters. WPO was the second broadcasting station licensed in Tennessee. (Note: WKN, also in Memphis, had been licensed as Tennessee's first radio station five days earlier.)

On April 22, Tennessee's governor, Alfred Taylor, made a speech from the station, which included the statement that radio was "more powerful than Hercules; more obedient than the genie of Aladdin; more swift in flight than the wing-footed Mercury".

The station was actually operated by employees of the Memphis News-Scimitar, a local newspaper. Percy Root was responsible for technical operations. Reporter Coyle Shea initially handled administrative duties, but, after four weeks, was replaced by another reporter, Gwen Wagner, who was paid an extra $10 per week for the radio station duties. In addition to live performers, WPO's programming was provided by a Steinway Duo-Art player piano and a Victor Victrola record player, furnished by the O. K. Houck Piano Co. A sample schedule was:
7 p. m.—Baseball results.
7:05 p. m.—News brevities.
7:20 p. m.—Cortese Bros. on harp and violin.
7:50 p. m.—Bedtime story.
8:10 p. m.—Selections on the reproducing piano.
8:30 p. m.—New records on the phonograph.

Because there was only the single "entertainment" wavelength of 360 meters at this time, WPO had to establish a time-sharing arrangement with other local stations, and WKN, operated by Riechman-Crosby Company, was reported in August to be broadcasting from 8:15 to 9:10 p. m.

WPO was eventually unable to compete with the development of better financed and more powerful Memphis stations, and began having trouble attracting performers. It ended broadcasting in December 1922, without notifying listeners that it was permanently ending operations. According to Gwen Wagner, "We did not carry a line in the paper about our having closed our station. Few knew when we closed and still fewer cared." The station was formally deleted on June 12, 1923.

In 1937, the Memphis Press-Scimitar purchased station WNBR, and changed its call sign to WMPS.

== See also ==
- List of initial AM-band station grants in the United States
