= KGG (AM) =

Radio station in Portland, Oregon (1922-1924)

KGG was a short-lived American AM radio station in Portland, Oregon. First licensed on March 15, 1922, it was the first broadcasting station authorized in the state. KGG was deleted in November 1924.

== History ==
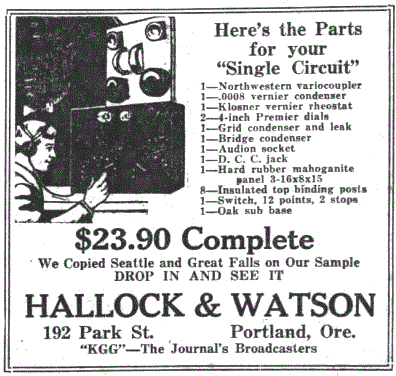
KGG was licensed to the Hallock & Watson Radio Service.

The Department of Commerce regulated radio stations in the United States from 1912 until the 1927 formation of the Federal Radio Commission. Originally there were no restrictions on which radio stations could make broadcasts intended for the general public. However, effective December 1, 1921, a regulation was adopted limiting broadcasting to stations operating under a Limited Commercial license that authorized operation on designated wavelengths of 360 meters (833 kHz) for "entertainment", and 485 meters (619 kHz) for "market and weather reports".

KGG was first licensed on March 15, 1922, to the Hallock & Watson Radio Service, for operation on 360 meters. The call sign was randomly issued from a list of available call letters. Programming was primarily arranged in association with a local newspaper, the Oregon Journal, which also had affiliations with stations KGN and KYG. Because there was only a single "entertainment" wavelength, KGG was required to establish a time-sharing agreement with any other local stations broadcasting on 360 meters. A delay, caused by technical issues, kept KGG off the air until March 28.

In 1924, the American Telephone and Telegraph Company (AT&T) began legal proceedings against radio stations using transmitters it considered to be infringing on the company's patents. This included almost all existing stations, with the primary exception of about 40 which had purchased transmitters from AT&T's subsidiary, Western Electric. A test case against WHN was settled out-of-court, after which AT&T announced settlement fees for the industry. Some stations, including KGG, decided to shut down instead of paying AT&T for the right to continue operating. The last KGG broadcast was held on May 31, 1924, and although this was described as a summertime suspension, the station never resumed broadcasting. KGG was formally deleted on November 25, 1924.

== See also ==
- List of initial AM-band station grants in the United States
