= WMB (AM) =

Radio station in Auburn, Maine (1922-1923)

WMB was a short-lived American AM radio station in Auburn, Maine. First licensed on March 21, 1922, it was the first broadcasting station authorized in the state. WMB was deleted in March 1923.

== History ==
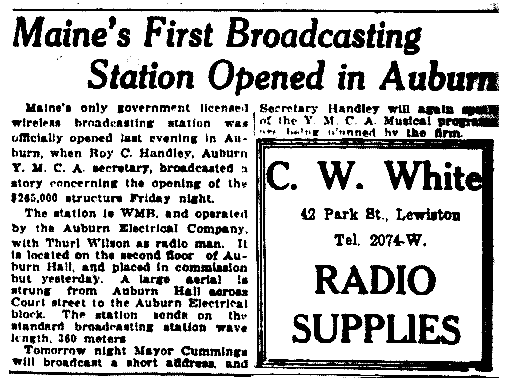
May 4, 1922 report of WMB's debut broadcast.

Broadcasting from Auburn Electrical originated with unlicensed experimental broadcasts conducted by an employee, Thurl Wilson. The Department of Commerce regulated radio stations in the United States from 1912 until the 1927 formation of the Federal Radio Commission. Originally there were no restrictions on which radio stations could make broadcasts intended for the general public. However, effective December 1, 1921, a regulation was adopted limiting broadcasting to stations operating under a Limited Commercial license that authorized operation on designated wavelengths of 360 meters (833 kHz) for "entertainment", and 485 meters (619 kHz) for "market and weather reports".

WMB was first licensed on April 5, 1922, to the Auburn Electrical Company, for operation on the 360 meter entertainment wavelength. The call sign was randomly issued from a list of available call letters. Because there was only a single "entertainment" wavelength, WMB was required to establish a time sharing agreement with any other local stations broadcasting on 360 meters. Thurl Wilson, along with a licensed operator, D. Wayne Bendix, were primarily responsible for station operations.

In November 1922, there was a report that the Victor Radio Company of New York was interested in buying the station, but this sale never happened. WMB was deleted on March 21, 1923.

== See also ==
- List of initial AM-band station grants in the United States
