= KDYS (AM) =

Radio station in Great Falls, Montana (1922-1923)

KDYS was a short-lived American AM radio station in Great Falls, Montana. First licensed on May 13, 1922, it was the first broadcasting station authorized in the state. KDYS was deleted in November 1923.

== History ==
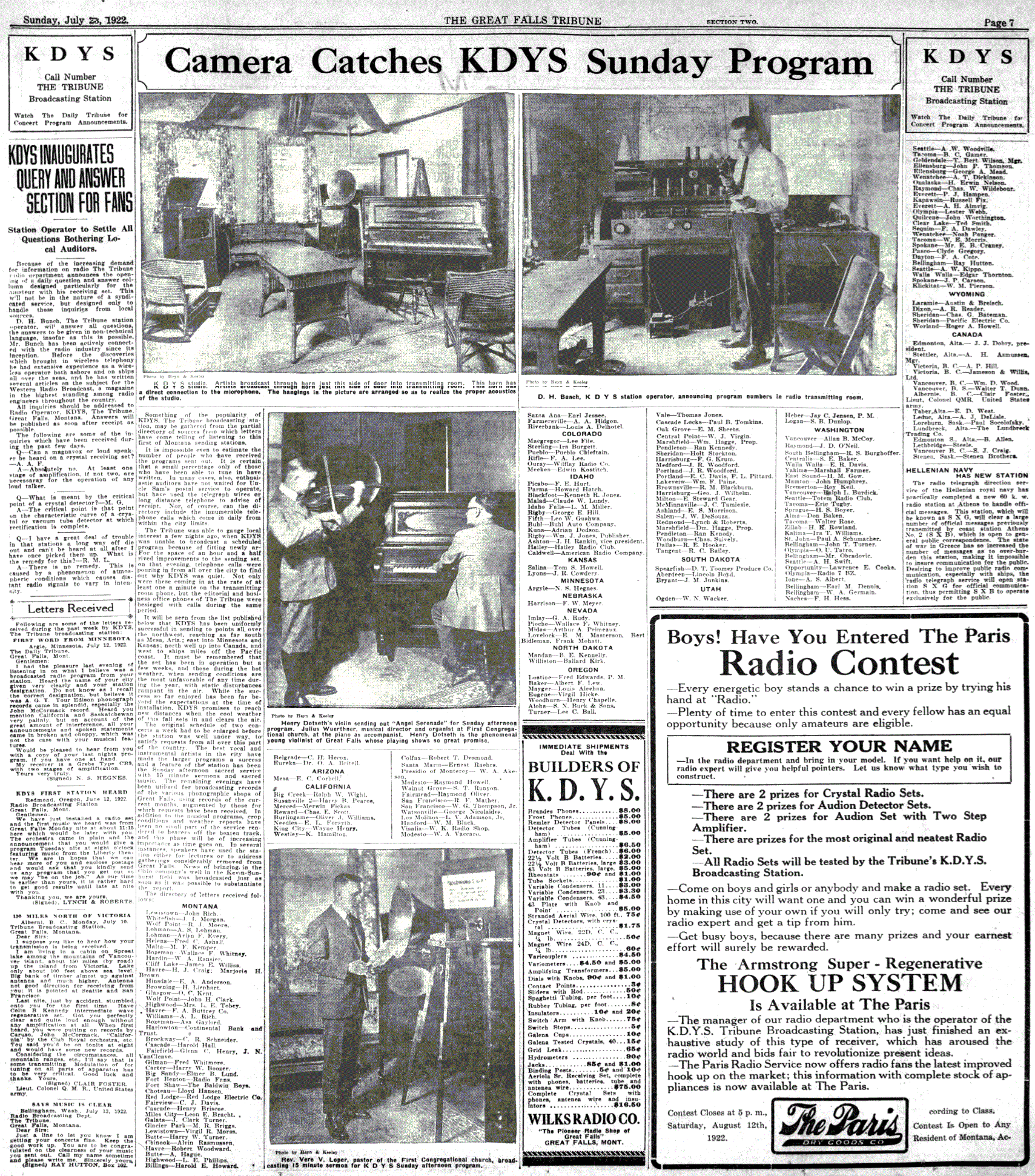
July 23, 1922 station articles.

The US Department of Commerce regulated radio stations in the United States from 1912 until the 1927 formation of the Federal Radio Commission. Originally there were no restrictions on which radio stations could make broadcasts intended for the general public. However, effective December 1, 1921, a regulation was adopted limiting broadcasting to stations operating under a Limited Commercial license that authorized operation on designated wavelengths of 360 meters (833 kHz) for "entertainment", and 485 meters (619 kHz) for "market and weather reports".

KDYS was first licensed on May 13, 1922, to The Tribune, for operation on 360 meters. The call sign was randomly issued from an alphabetic list of available call letters. Because there was only a single "entertainment" wavelength, KDYS was required to establish a time sharing agreement with any other local stations broadcasting on 360 meters. In August, the station was authorized to also use the 485 meter "market and weather" wavelength, although this was canceled the following April.

On November 25, 1923, the newspaper announced that "The radio equipment of KDYS, The Tribune's broadcasting station, has been sealed and no programs will be sent into the air from this station for at least six months." The newspaper noted that "The Tribune has considered its investment in KDYS and the cost of its maintenance as an investment in 'good will' and the thousands of cards and letters that have been received from its readers in Montana and radio fans in all parts of the United States, Canada, Mexico and Alaska are evidence that KDYS' programs have been appreciated." However, "The station was sealed Saturday after The Tribune management came to the conclusion that, to successfully compete with the many excellent broadcasting stations along the Pacific coast and in the middle west, it would be necessary to expend several thousands of dollars to bring the KDYS set up to standards that The Tribune would like to have it. Further, it must be admitted that it is impossible for KDYS to obtain for all of its programs as many talented artists as are available for broadcasting stations in larger cities." The station was deleted five days later.

== See also ==
- List of initial AM-band station grants in the United States
