= WGF (AM) =

Radio station in Des Moines, Iowa (1922–1923)

WGF was a short-lived AM radio station, located in Des Moines, Iowa. First authorized on March 14, 1922, it was the first broadcasting station authorized in the state. It was deleted in September 1923.

== History ==
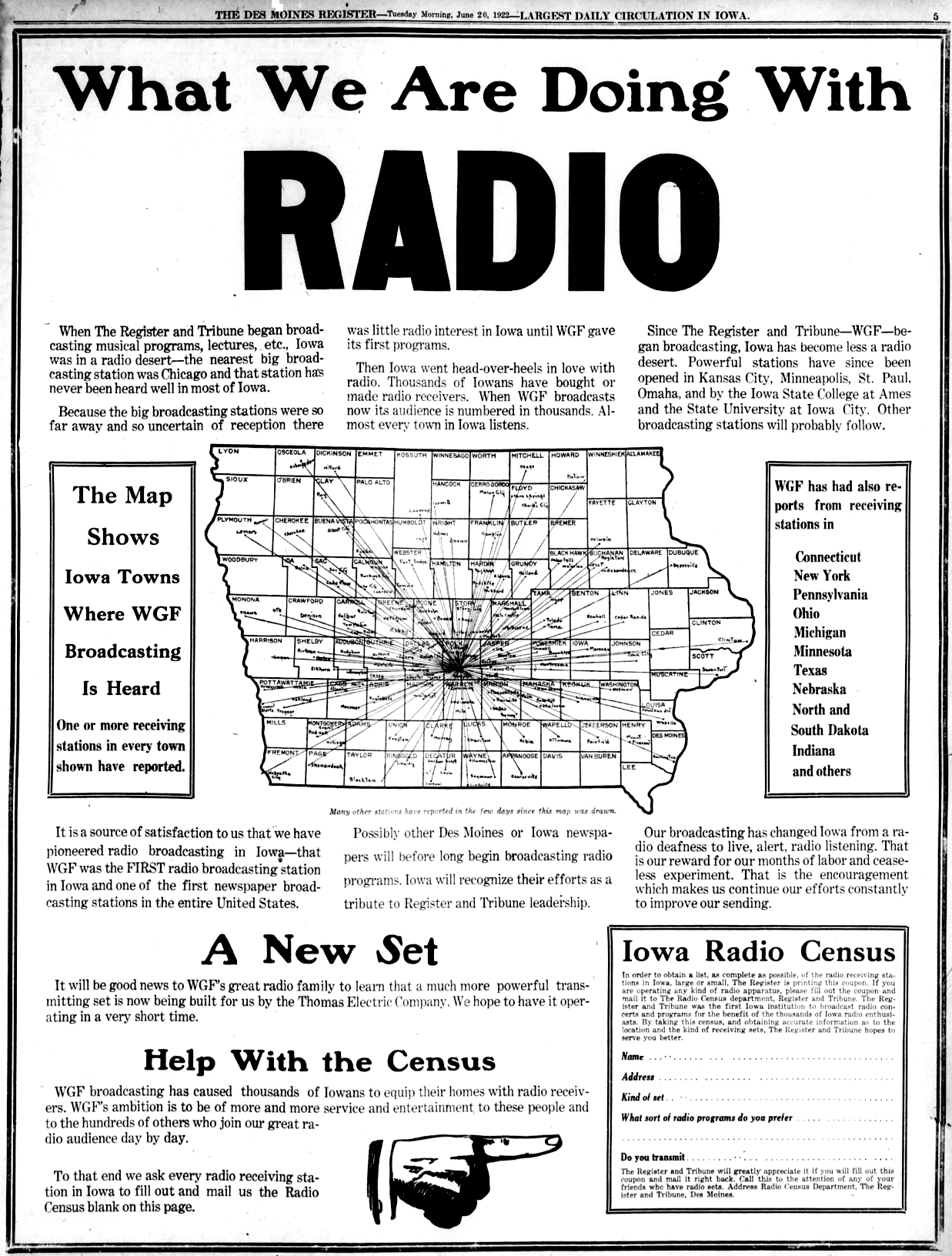
Station advertisement (June 20, 1922).

The Department of Commerce regulated radio stations in the United States from 1912 until the 1927 formation of the Federal Radio Commission. Originally there were no restrictions on which radio stations could make broadcasts intended for the general public. However, effective December 1, 1921, a regulation was adopted limiting broadcasting to stations operating under a Limited Commercial license that authorized operation on designated wavelengths of 360 meters (833 kHz) for "entertainment", and 485 meters (619 kHz) for "market and weather reports".

WGF was first authorized, by telegram, on March 14, 1922, to a Des Moines newspaper, the Register and Tribune, for operation on the 360 meter "entertainment" wavelength. The call sign was randomly issued from a list of available call letters. Currently most stations west of the Mississippi River have call letters beginning with "K". However, prior to the January 1923 establishment of the Mississippi River as the boundary, call letters beginning with "W" were generally assigned to stations east of an irregular line formed by the western state borders from North Dakota south to Texas, with calls beginning with "K" going only to stations in states west of that line. Because there was only a single "entertainment" wavelength, WGF was required to establish a time sharing agreement with any other local stations broadcasting on 360 meters. Later that year, the station was also authorized to broadcast on the 485 meter "market and weather" wavelength.

The front page of the newspaper's March 21 issue announced that: "The Register and Tribune radio broadcasting station, WGF, will begin sending music and speeches over the wireless waves with the speed of light promptly at 7:30 this evening. Listen in!"

The last newspaper report of a WGF broadcast was in late June 1923, although singer Wendell Hall was reported to have visited the station the next month. WGF was deleted on September 29, 1923.

== See also ==
- List of initial AM-band station grants in the United States
