= WGH (Alabama) =

Radio station in Montgomery, Alabama (1922)

WGH was a short-lived AM radio station, located in Montgomery, Alabama. First licensed on February 3, 1922, it was the first broadcasting station authorized in the state. The station was deleted the following June.

== History ==
The Department of Commerce regulated radio stations in the United States from 1912 until the 1927 formation of the Federal Radio Commission. Originally there were no restrictions on which radio stations could make broadcasts intended for the general public. However, effective December 1, 1921, a regulation was adopted limiting broadcasting to stations operating under a Limited Commercial license that authorized operation on designated wavelengths of 360 meters (833 kHz) for "entertainment", and 485 meters (619 kHz) for "market and weather reports".

WGH was first licensed on February 3, 1922, to the Montgomery Light & Water Power Company in Montgomery, for operation on 360 meters. The station debuted on the day it received its license. The call sign was randomly issued from a roster of available call letters, and it was the first broadcasting station licensed in Alabama. Studios were located on the third floor of a Dexter Avenue office building. Because there was only the single "entertainment" wavelength of 360 meters at this time, stations near to each other had to establish time sharing agreements.

In late March, it was announced that "...the local power company has agreed to close down its station WGH, should it be decided to construct a modern long distance radio broadcasting station in Montgomery..." WGH was deleted on June 5, 1922. Montgomery Light and Water Power was struggling financially, and in 1923 was purchased by Alabama Power, which had established its own station, WSY in Birmingham.

== See also ==
- List of initial AM-band station grants in the United States
