= KQL =

Radio station in Los Angeles, California (1921–1922)

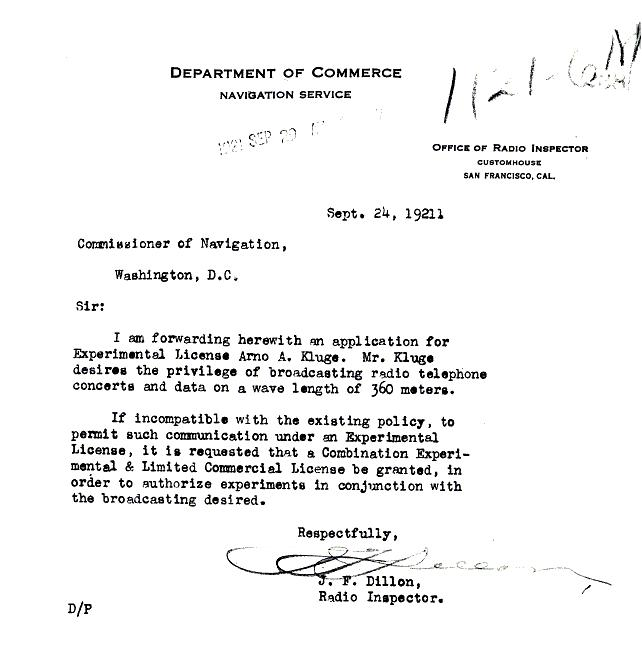
Cover letter prepared by J. F. Dillon, 6th district Radio Inspector for the U.S. Commerce Department, summarizing Arno A. Kluge's application for a radio station license to broadcast "radio telephone concerts and data on a wavelength of 360 meters".

KQL was a radio station, located in Los Angeles, California, that was licensed to Arno A. Kluge from October 13, 1921 to June 9, 1922. This was the first broadcasting station licensed in the state of California, and one of the first in the United States. However, the station was short-lived, because Kluge died just 2 1/2 months after it was authorized.

== History ==
KQL was first licensed as a broadcasting station to Arno A. Kluge on October 13, 1921, at 1045 South Bixel Street in Los Angeles. At this time Kluge was well established as a radio experimenter and equipment retailer. During World War One he had served as a Signal Corps instructor at the University of Nebraska, which gave him experience with the recently developed vacuum tube transmitters that made audio transmissions practical. However, an earlier electrical accident resulted in a progressive deterioration of his spine. After the war he moved to Los Angeles, now largely confined to a chair and housebound due to paralysis of his legs.

In 1920, he was issued a standard amateur radio station license, with the call sign 6DF, in addition to an Experimental station license, 6XN, that was jointly held with A. H. McClelland and J. B. Farrington. Kluge was credited with being the second in the southern California region to transmit audio radio programs, initially over 6XN. In the fall of 1921, he applied for an Experimental radio license in his own name. His application also requested authorization to broadcast "radio telephone concerts and data on a wavelength of 360 meters". Because these were separate functions, Arno was issued two different licenses: an Experimental license with the call sign 6XAO, plus a Limited Commercial authorization on October 13, 1921, with the randomly assigned call sign of KQL, for broadcasting on 360 meters (833 kHz). (The license for 6XAO was deleted a couple of months later.)

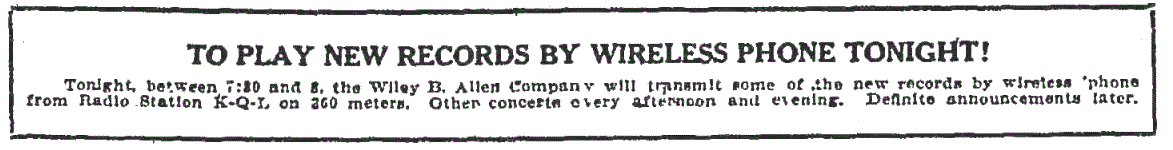
A November 1, 1921, advertisement for the Wiley B. Allen Company referenced broadcasts of phonograph records in conjunction with KQL.

There were no formal standards in the United States regarding radio transmissions intended for the general public until December 1, 1921, when the Department of Commerce, which regulated radio at this time, adopted a regulation creating a broadcasting station category. These stations were required to hold a Limited Commercial license authorizing operation on 360 or 485 meters. KQL was among a small number of stations that already met this standard at the time of its adoption, and was the only one located west of the Mississippi River. However, Kluge's health was deteriorating and KQL's fledgling broadcasting activities came to an abrupt end with his death, at the age of 23, on December 31, 1921.

Although now inactive, KQL continued to appear on broadcasting station lists until its license was canceled on June 9, 1922, with 6XN deleted the same month. Today, KWG in Stockton is the oldest surviving radio station in California.

== See also ==
- List of initial AM-band station grants in the United States
