= WWT (AM) =

Radio station in Buffalo, New York (1922)

WWT was a radio broadcasting station in Buffalo, New York, licensed to McCarthy Brothers & Ford from March 25, 1922 until its deletion on October 2, 1922.

== History ==
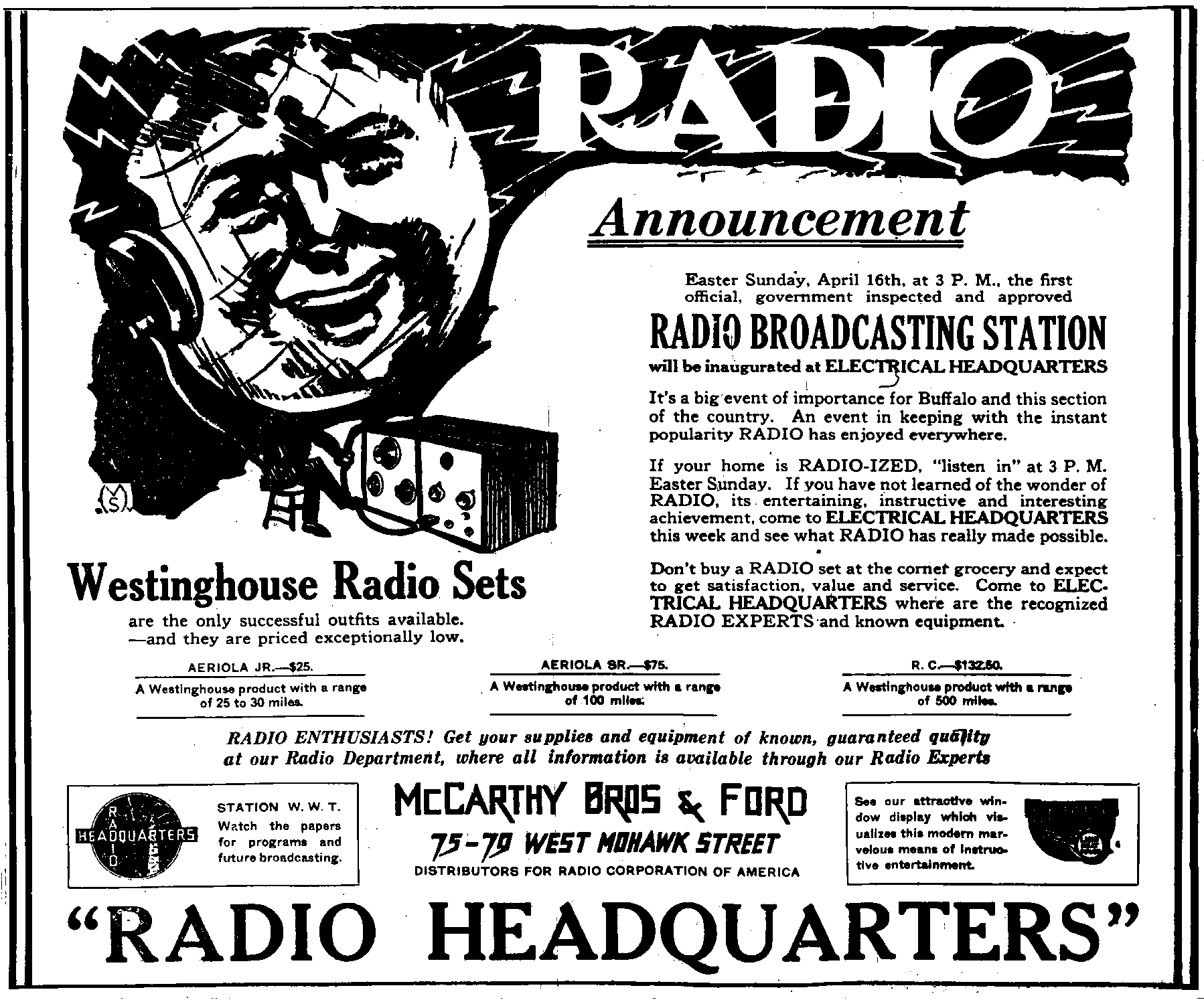
WWT made its debut broadcast on April 16, 1922.

Although most early radio transmissions were in Morse code, Buffalo was the site of some early audio experiments, including a broadcast of election results by Charles C. Kilnek Jr. on November 2, 1920.

Effective December 1, 1921, the Department of Commerce, which regulated U.S. radio at this time, adopted regulations formally defining "broadcasting stations". The wavelength of 360 meters (833 kHz) was designated for entertainment broadcasts, while 485 meters (619 kHz) was reserved for broadcasting official weather and other government reports.

The Buffalo Courier and Enquirer was issued a temporary authorization for 360 meters, with the call sign WPU, for a January 22, 1922 broadcast. Employing apparatus "furnished by the Federal Telephone & Telegraph Co.", the WPU transmission originated from McCarthy Brothers & Ford, and after a successful broadcast, company officials were quoted that "The concert is a proof of the practical success of the wireless telephone."

On March 25, 1922, McCarthy Brothers & Ford was issued its own license, for Buffalo's second non-temporary broadcasting station, (Note: WGR had been issued Buffalo's first standard broadcasting station license eleven days earlier.) with the randomly assigned call letters WWT, transmitting on 360 meters. The station made its debut broadcast starting at 3:00 p.m. on Easter Sunday, April 16, 1922.

In early July, the station was reported to have suspended operations for the summer. WWT was deleted on October 2, 1922.

== See also ==
- List of initial AM-band station grants in the United States
