= WLK (AM) =

Radio station in Indianapolis, Indiana (1922–1923)

WLK was a short-lived American AM radio station in Indianapolis, Indiana. First licensed on January 18, 1922, it was the first broadcasting station authorized in the state. It was deleted in June 1923.

== History ==
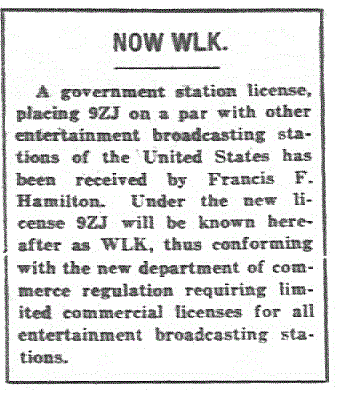
WLK originated as the successor to broadcasts over Special Amateur station 9ZJ.

WLK traced its origin to earlier broadcasts, begun in the fall of 1921, over a Special Amateur station, 9ZJ, licensed to Francis F. Hamilton. Hamilton later began operating the station in conjunction with the Indianapolis News newspaper. The Department of Commerce regulated radio stations in the United States from 1912 until the 1927 formation of the Federal Radio Commission. Originally there were no restrictions on which radio stations could make broadcasts intended for the general public. However, effective December 1, 1921, a regulation was adopted limiting broadcasting to stations operating under a Limited Commercial license that authorized operation on designated wavelengths of 360 meters (833 kHz) for "entertainment", and 485 meters (619 kHz) for "market and weather reports".

WLK was first licensed on January 18, 1922, to the Hamilton Manufacturing Company in Indianapolis, for operation on the 360 meter "entertainment" wavelength. The call sign was randomly issued from a list of available call letters. Because there was only a single "entertainment" wavelength, WLK was required to establish a time sharing agreement with any other local stations broadcasting on 360 meters.

A short notice in the April 7, 1923 issue of the Indianapolis News announced that: "The Hamilton radio broadcasting station WLK will broadcast its last program Sunday evening, April 8." WLK was deleted on June 1, 1923.

== See also ==
- List of initial AM-band station grants in the United States
