= KJQ (California) =

Radio station in Stockton, California (1921–1923)

KJQ was a short-lived broadcasting station in Stockton, California, licensed to Clarence O. Gould. It was issued its first license in December 1921, and deleted three and one-half years later.

== History ==
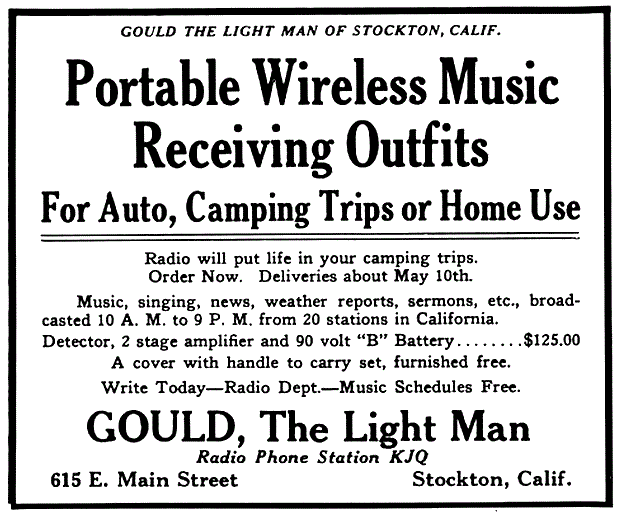
Advertisement for Gould, The Light Man store and radio station KJQ (1922)

In the early 1920s Clarence O. Gould operated an electrical store, known as "Gould The Light Man", which was advertised as "The Only Real Radio Store in San Joaquin Valley".

Effective December 1, 1921, the Commerce Department, which regulated radio communication at this time, formally established a broadcasting service category. This new standard required stations to hold a Limited Commercial license that authorized operation on two designated broadcasting wavelengths: 360 meters (833 kHz) for "entertainment", and 485 meters (619 kHz) for "market and weather reports". On December 20, 1921, a broadcasting station license with the randomly assigned call sign KJQ was issued to C. O. Gould at 615 East Main Street in Stockton, California, for operation on 360 meters.

Initially the 360 meter wavelength was the only "entertainment" frequency available, so stations within various regions had to create timesharing agreements to assign individual operating slots. An August 1922 schedule reported that KJQ was broadcasting daily from 5:00-5:30 p.m., plus 7:00-8:00 p.m. on Wednesday and 10:00-11:00 a.m. and 7:00-8:00 p.m. on Sunday. By November 1, 1922, there were seven "Inland Stations" sharing time on 360 meters, with KJQ allocated 9:00-10:00 p.m. daily except Sunday, and 10:00-11:00 a.m. Sunday.

In early 1924 the Department of Commerce reported that KJQ had been reassigned to 1100 kHz. However, contemporary reports continued to list the station as transmitting on 360 meters, sharing time with Stockton's other radio station, KWG. KJQ eventually suspended operations and was deleted in April 1925. Gould later wrote Radex magazine stating that the station was shut down because "it was impossible for him to meet new broadcasting regulations".

== See also ==
- List of initial AM-band station grants in the United States
