= KOG (AM) =

Radio station in Los Angeles, California (1921–1923)

KOG was a short-lived AM broadcasting station, licensed to the Western Radio Electric Company in Los Angeles, California. It was issued its first license, as KZC, in December 1921, changed its callsign to KOG a few weeks later, and was deleted less than a year and one half after its start.

== History ==
=== 6XD ===
KOG was first licensed as a broadcasting station in December 1921. However the station's owner, the Western Radio Electric Company of Los Angeles, California, already had extensive experience making broadcasts intended for the general public under an earlier experimental license.

Beginning in late 1912, radio communication in the United States was regulated by the Department of Commerce. Initially there were no formal standards for which stations could make broadcasts intended for the general public, and after World War I stations under a variety of license classes, most commonly Amateur and Experimental, began making regularly scheduled programs on a limited basis.

In 1919 Les E. Taufenback (as president) and Harold Nunan founded the Western Radio Electric Company, then at 637 South Hope in Los Angeles. In early 1920, the company received a license for an experimental station with the call sign 6XD. (Note: The "6" in 6XD's call sign indicated that the station was located in the sixth Radio Inspection district, while the "X" signified that it was operating under an Experimental license.) 6XD was credited with being the first station in the Los Angeles region to conduct experimental entertainment broadcasts, which began around mid-1920. By the fall of 1921 the station was at 550 South Flower Street and featured "the latest Victor Records as soon as they are ready for distribution" as provided by Richardson's Music Shop. At this time 6XD's broadcasting schedule consisted of twice-weekly concerts on Tuesday and Friday evenings from 8 to 9 p.m., transmitted on a wavelength of 325 meters (923 kHz).

=== KZC/KOG ===
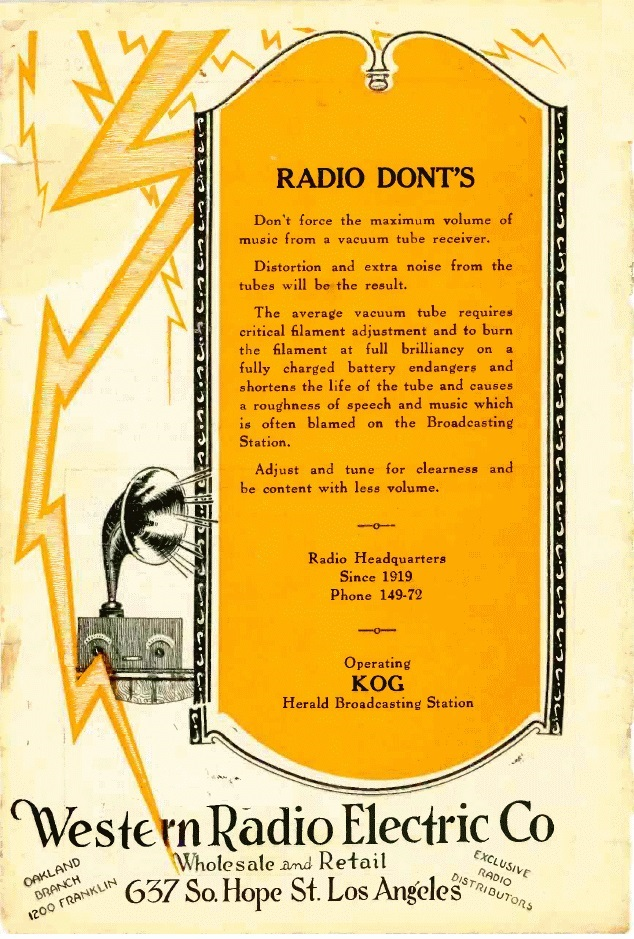
August 1922 Western Radio Electric Company advertisement.

In order to provide common standards for the broadcasting activity starting to appear nationwide, the Commerce Department adopted a regulation effective December 1, 1921, requiring broadcasting stations to hold a Limited Commercial license that authorized operation on two designated broadcasting wavelengths: 360 meters (833 kHz) for "entertainment", and 485 meters (619 kHz) for "market and weather reports".

On December 9, 1921, a broadcasting station license with the randomly assigned call sign KZC was issued to Western Radio Electric Company, for operation on 360 meters. This was the second broadcasting station authorization, following Arno A. Kluge's KQL, issued for Los Angeles under the new regulations. In mid-December 1921 it was announced that Western Radio Electric, now at 550 South Flower Street, was installing "a powerful 50-watt continuous wave transmitter" at the Kinema Theater at Seventh and Grand Streets, and "the orchestra selections, organ solos and songs from the stage will be broadcasted through space". On February 2, 1922, the station's call letters were changed from KZC to KOG, although no reason was given for the change.

Advertisements for KOG variously identified the station as the "Kinema Theater Radiophone" and the "Herald Broadcasting Station". Initially the 360 meter wavelength was the only "entertainment" frequency available, so stations within various regions had to development timesharing agreements to assign individual operating slots. In mid-May 1922, KOG, in conjunction with the Kinema, was assigned 12:00-12:15 p.m. and 5:00-5:30 p.m. weekdays, plus 8:00-9:00 p.m. Tuesday, Wednesday and Friday evenings. An August 1922 schedule reported that KOG was conducting broadcasts on both the 360-meter "entertainment" wavelength (daily 12:00-12:30 p.m. (except Saturday) and 4:30-5:00 p.m., Thursday from 8:00-9:00 p.m. and Monday and Wednesday 9:00-10:00 p.m.) and on the 485-meter "market and weather" wavelength daily at 12:30-1:00 p.m.

A regional schedule adopted November 1, 1922 reduced KOG's broadcasts to just three hours per week, from 5:00-5:30 p.m. Monday through Saturday, and during the third week of December, each of the station's programs consisted of a 15-minute block of Morse code practice followed by 15 minutes of "Evening Herald News Bulletins". Eventually the broadcasts ceased altogether, and the station was formally deleted on March 9, 1923.

== See also ==
- List of initial AM-band station grants in the United States
