= KJJ =

Radio station in Sunnyvale, California (1921–1923)

KJJ was a short-lived radio station, licensed to The Radio Shop in Sunnyvale, California. It was issued its first license in December 1921 and deleted a year and one half later.

== History ==
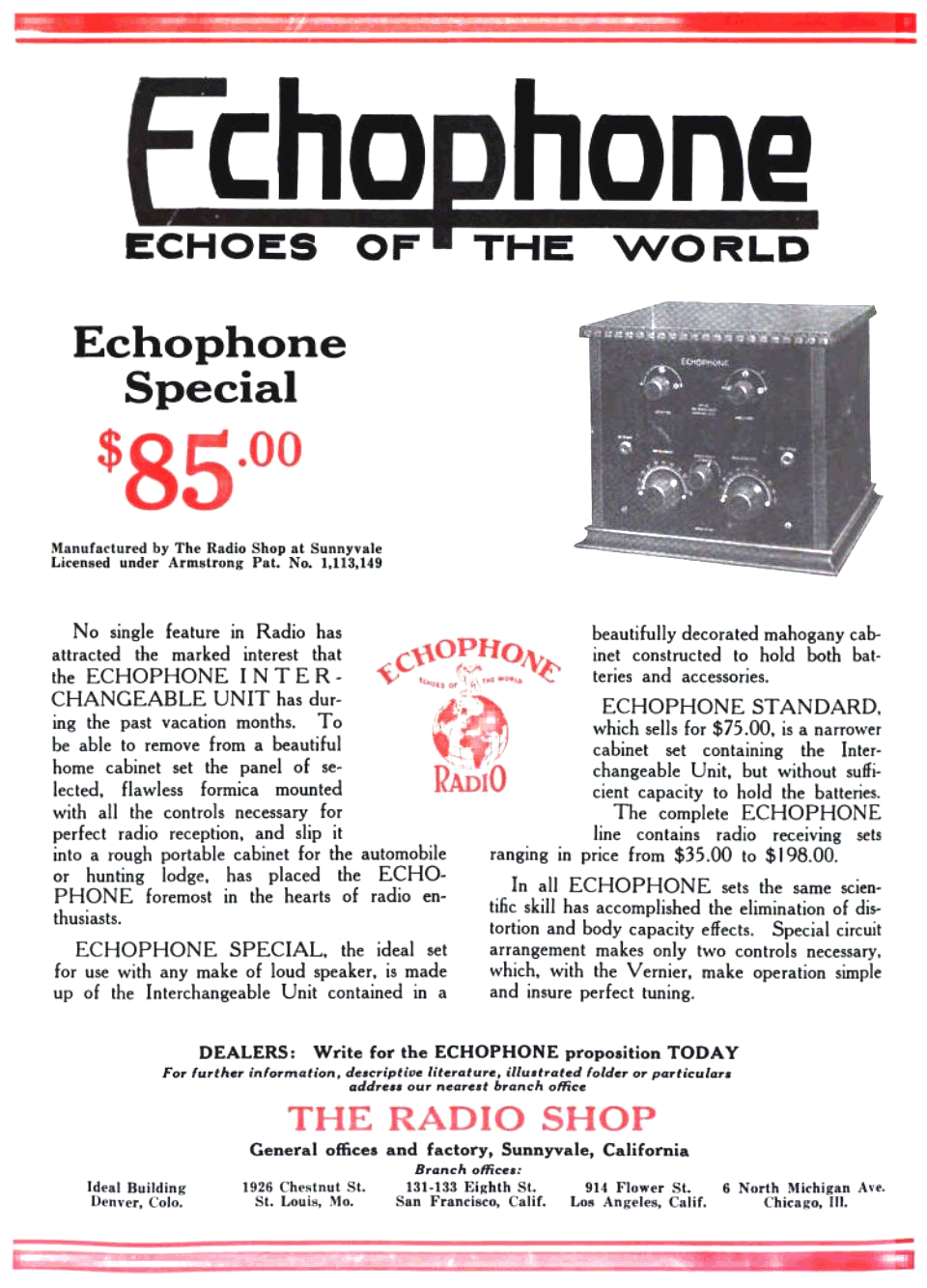
The Radio Shop was best known for its line of Echophone radio receivers

The Radio Shop was a small manufacturing concern in Sunnyvale, California, that greatly expanded with the rise of broadcasting in the early 1920s. The company's primary figures were Tom Lambert and Arthur E. Bessey, along with E. H. Bessey. Arthur Bessey held a license for a Special Amateur station, 6ZK, (Note: The "6" in 6ZK's call sign meant that the station was in the sixth Radio Inspection district, while the "Z" indicated that the station was operating under a Special Amateur license.) while Lambert had a background as an equipment designer. In September 1920 Bessey procured a valuable license from Edwin Howard Armstrong to use his regeneration patent, which was needed to build quality radio receivers. By 1922 the company was thriving, and a contemporary review wrote that "From a single room in the Bank of Italy building in San Jose to a magnificently equipped factory, from a business starting with nothing to advance orders on hand aggregating $750,000, in two years, is the actual achievement of these young men, whom the city of Sunnyvale may well congratulate itself on acquiring".

Beginning in late 1912, radio communication in the United States was regulated by the Department of Commerce. Initially there were no formal standards for which stations could make broadcasts intended for the general public, and after World War I stations under a variety of license classes, most commonly Amateur and Experimental, began making regularly scheduled programs on a limited basis. In order to provide common standards for the service, the Commerce Department issued a regulation effective December 1, 1921, that stated that broadcasting stations would now have to hold a Limited Commercial license that authorized operation on two designated broadcasting wavelengths: 360 meters (833 kHz) for "entertainment", and 485 meters (619 kHz) for "market and weather reports". On December 20, 1921 a broadcasting station license with the randomly assigned call letters KJJ was issued to The Radio Shop, for operation on 360 meters.

Initially the 360 meter wavelength was the only "entertainment" frequency available, so stations within various regions had to create timesharing agreements to assign individual operating slots. An August 1922 schedule reported KJJ operating Tuesday 8:15-9:00 p.m. and Friday 7:30-8:15 p.m. By November 1, 1922, there were twelve "San Francisco Bay District" stations sharing time on 360 meters, with KJJ broadcasting just one hour per week, from 8:00-9:00 p.m. on Thursday.

In late December it was reported "That more time will be available after January 1 is indicated in the confirmed reports that both the Emporium in San Francisco [KSL] and the Radio Shop at Sunnyvale will quit broadcasting after the first of the year." The following March it was noted that "The station at Sunnyvale, KJJ, has not been heard for several weeks and apparently has quit broadcasting, although no announcement to that effect has been made." KJJ was formally deleted on July 2, 1923.

== See also ==
- List of initial AM-band station grants in the United States
