= KDN (San Francisco) =

Radio station in San Francisco (1921–1923)

KDN was a short-lived radio station in San Francisco, licensed to the Leo J. Meyberg Company and located at the Fairmont Hotel. It was issued its first license in December 1921 and deleted a year and one half later.

== History ==
=== 6XG ===
Although KDN was first licensed as a broadcasting station in late 1921, this was actually a relicensing and continuation of operations begun under an Experimental license, 6XG, (Note: The "6" in 6XG's call sign indicated that the station was located in the sixth Radio Inspection district, while the "X" meant that it was operating under an Experimental license.) issued to the Leo J. Meyberg Company a few months earlier. The Meyberg company was an electrical parts distributor with offices in San Francisco and Los Angeles that boasted it had "the largest radio stock of the Pacific coast". 6XG was the first of two stations established by Meyberg for providing a broadcasting service, as later that year the company began operating 6XAK (later KZC/KOG) from the Hamburger's department store in Los Angeles.

6XG inaugurated regular programming in June, transmitting from the Fairmont Hotel on Nob Hill in San Francisco, using a wavelength of 350 meters (857 kHz) and initially employing a 10 watt transmitter. The station adopted an ambitious programming schedule. By late summer, it was broadcasting daily, except Sunday, concerts from 4:30-5:30 p.m., plus evening concerts Monday, Thursday and Sunday from 7:45-9:00 p.m. Included with these programs were "the usual press and baseball schedule, as well as weather reports and stock quotations". In the late fall a few modifications in the schedule were reported, most notably the addition of a daily, except Sunday, broadcast from 7:45-8:00 p.m.

=== KDN ===
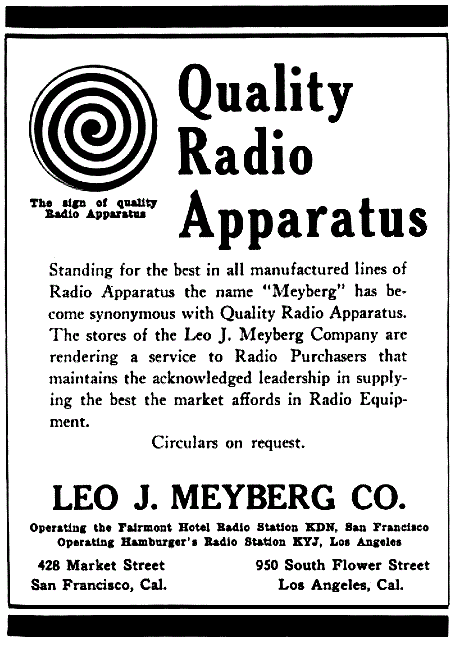
The Leo J. Meyberg Company operated two early radio stations: KDN in San Francisco and KYJ in Los Angeles.

Beginning in late 1912, radio communication in the United States was regulated by the Department of Commerce. Initially there were no formal standards for which stations could make broadcasts intended for the general public, and after World War I stations under a variety of license classes, most commonly Amateur and Experimental, began making regularly scheduled programs on a limited basis. In order to provide common standards for the service, the Commerce Department issued a regulation effective December 1, 1921, that stated that broadcasting stations would now have to hold a Limited Commercial license that authorized operation on two designated broadcasting wavelengths: 360 meters (833 kHz) for "entertainment", and 485 meters (619 kHz) for "market and weather reports". On December 8, 1921 a broadcasting station license with the randomly assigned call letters KDN was issued to the Leo J. Meyberg Company, for operation on 360 meters. A few months later the station received an additional authorization to transmit on the 485-meter "market and weather" wavelength.

Initially the 360 meter wavelength was the only "entertainment" frequency available, so stations within various regions had to create timesharing agreements to assign individual operating slots. An August 1922 schedule reported KDN operating 11:00-12:00 noon, 1:00-2:00 p.m., 4:30-5:30 p.m., and 7:00-7:15 p.m. daily, plus 10:00-11:00 a.m. Sunday, 8:30-9:00 pm. Monday, and 7:30-8:30 p.m. Thursday. By November 1, 1922, there were twelve "San Francisco Bay District" stations sharing time on 360 meters, with KDN allocated 1:00-2:00 p.m. and 4:30-5:15 p.m. daily, plus 8:30-10:00 p.m. Sunday and 8:00-9:00 p.m. Friday.

The Meyberg company soon decided to end its broadcasting activities. In late March it was announced that "Another popular station call is about to make its last bow to the radio public. This is KDN, owned and operated by The Leo J. Meyberg company, and located on the Fairmont Hotel in San Francisco. After April 1, Hale Brothers station, KPO, which is supported financially by the Pacific Radio Trade association as a community broadcasting center, will take over the Fairmont Hotel's programs, which are given by the Fairmont Hotel orchestra." The licenses for both KDN and Meyberg's Los Angeles station, KYJ, were subsequently deleted on May 1, 1923.

== See also ==
- List of initial AM-band station grants in the United States
