= WKN (AM) =

Radio station in Memphis, Tennessee (1922–1923)

WKN was a short-lived AM radio station, located in Memphis, Tennessee. First licensed on March 23, 1922, it was the first broadcasting station authorized in the state. It was deleted in June 1923.

== History ==
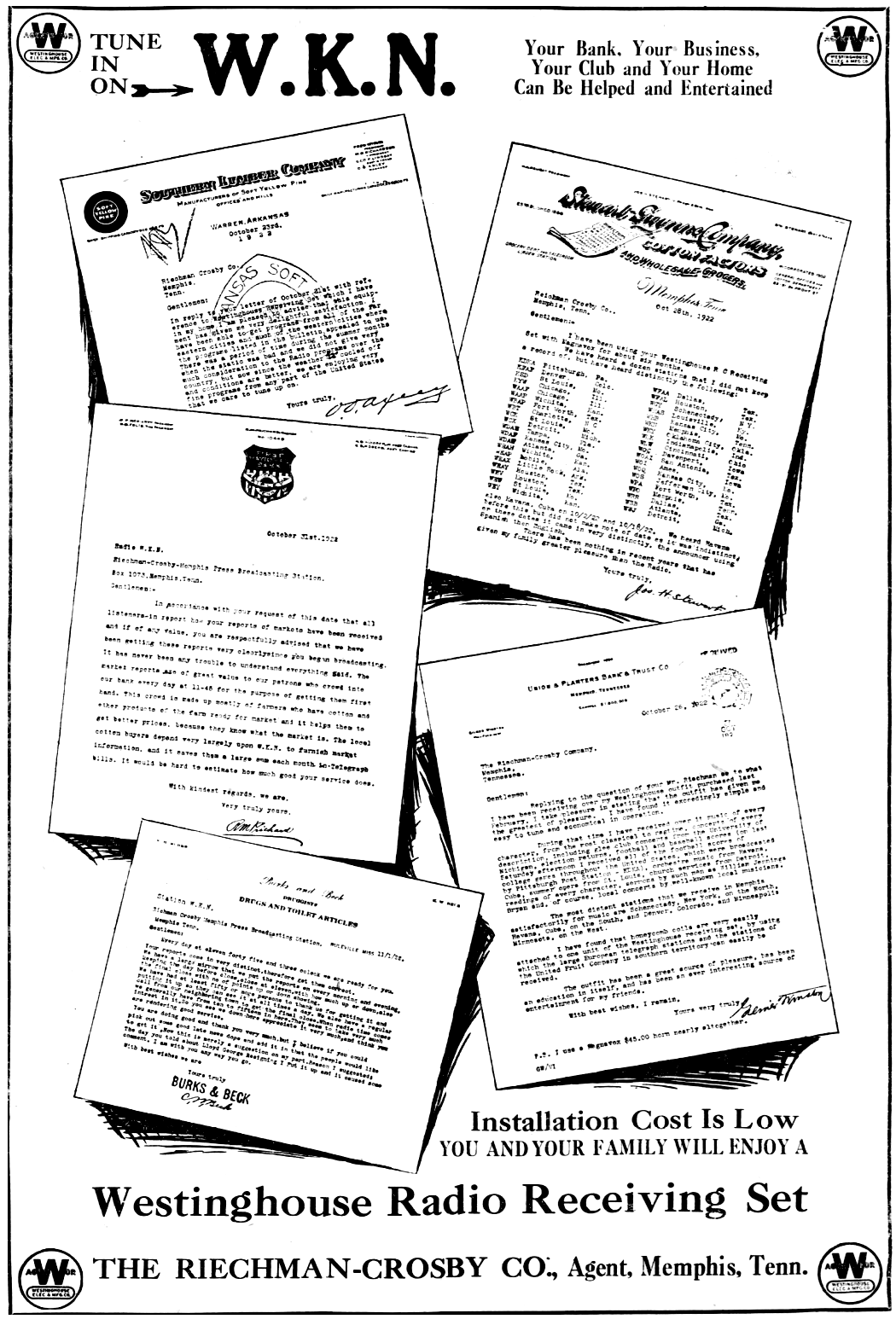
November 1922 station advertisement.

The Department of Commerce regulated radio stations in the United States from 1912 until the 1927 formation of the Federal Radio Commission. Originally there were no restrictions on which radio stations could make broadcasts intended for the general public. However, effective December 1, 1921, a regulation was adopted limiting broadcasting to stations operating under a Limited Commercial license that authorized operation on designated wavelengths of 360 meters (833 kHz) for "entertainment", and 485 meters (619 kHz) for "market and weather reports".

WKN was first licensed on March 23, 1922, to the Riechman-Crosby Company at 223 South Front Street in Memphis, for operation on both wavelengths. The call sign was randomly issued from a roster of available call letters. WKN was the first broadcasting station licensed in Tennessee. Alfred Cowles and Lavelette Semmes were responsible for constructing and operating the station. Cowles had earlier broadcasting experience, over his amateur station, 5NZ. (Note: The "5" in 5NZ's call sign indicated that it was located in the Fifth Radio Inspection District. The fact that the "N" fell in the range A-W indicated that it was a standard amateur station.)

Because there was only the single "entertainment" wavelength of 360 meters at this time, WKN had to establish a time-sharing arrangement with other local stations, and in August was reported to be broadcasting from 8:15 to 9:10 p. m.

In early 1923, the Commercial Appeal founded station WMC, which caused the Riechman-Crosby Company to shut down WKN, explaining that "...it was not considered wise to have two large and rival stations in Memphis, so The Commercial Appeal was given the field". WKN was deleted on June 11, 1923.

== See also ==
- List of initial AM-band station grants in the United States
