= WMH (1921–1923) =

Radio station in Cincinnati, Ohio

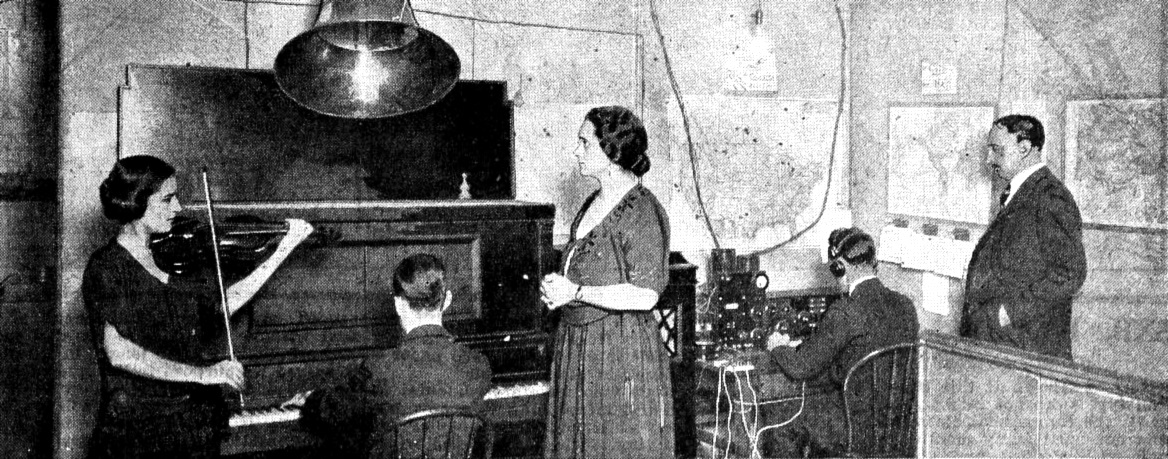
Circa 1920 photograph of station 8XB's broadcasting studio.

WMH was an AM radio station in Cincinnati, Ohio, which was licensed to the Precision Equipment Company from December 30, 1921, to December 11, 1923, although it ceased broadcasting in early January 1923. It was one of the first formally authorized broadcasting stations in the United States, and also the first licensed in the state of Ohio.

Prior to WMH's debut, Precision had made regular broadcasts while operating under an experimental radio station authorization. These began shortly after the World War I ban on civilian radio stations was lifted, and started as early as the fall of 1919 according to some accounts.

== 8XB ==
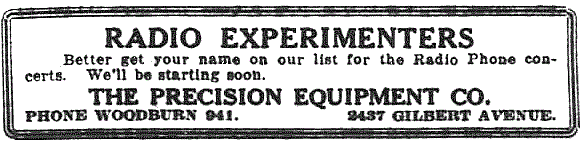
On January 24, 1920, the Precision Equipment Company announced that "Radio Phone concerts" would be "starting soon".

As is true with most early radio stations, information about the Precision Equipment Company's earliest activities is limited. The company was founded in Cincinnati in late 1918 by Thomas E. New as the Precision Engineering Association, with the name changed to the Precision Equipment Company a short time later. The company operated a store at 2437 Gilbert Avenue, in the Peebles Corner, Walnut Hills section of Cincinnati. It sold radio parts plus a line of receivers under the "Ace" brand name, originally to a small market of amateur radio enthusiasts.

In late 1919 or early 1920 Precision received a license to operate an experimental radio station with the call sign 8XB. (Note: The 8 in 8XB's call sign indicated that the station was located in the eighth Radio Inspection district, and the X meant that it was operating under an Experimental license.) (In 1961 New wrote 8XB's first license had been issued in September 1919, however this was a month before the U.S. government lifted the ban on civilian radio stations in place during World War I. An account by Harry F. Breckel stated that the station initially operated with the call sign "PC", prior to the issuance of the license for 8XB.) The station's vacuum-tube transmitter was constructed by New along with chief engineer Breckel, who had served as a Navy Lieutenant on the armed yacht Corsair during World War I. In November 1919 two-way voice communication was established with the government's Curtiss NC-4 airplane during its flight to Louisville, Kentucky.

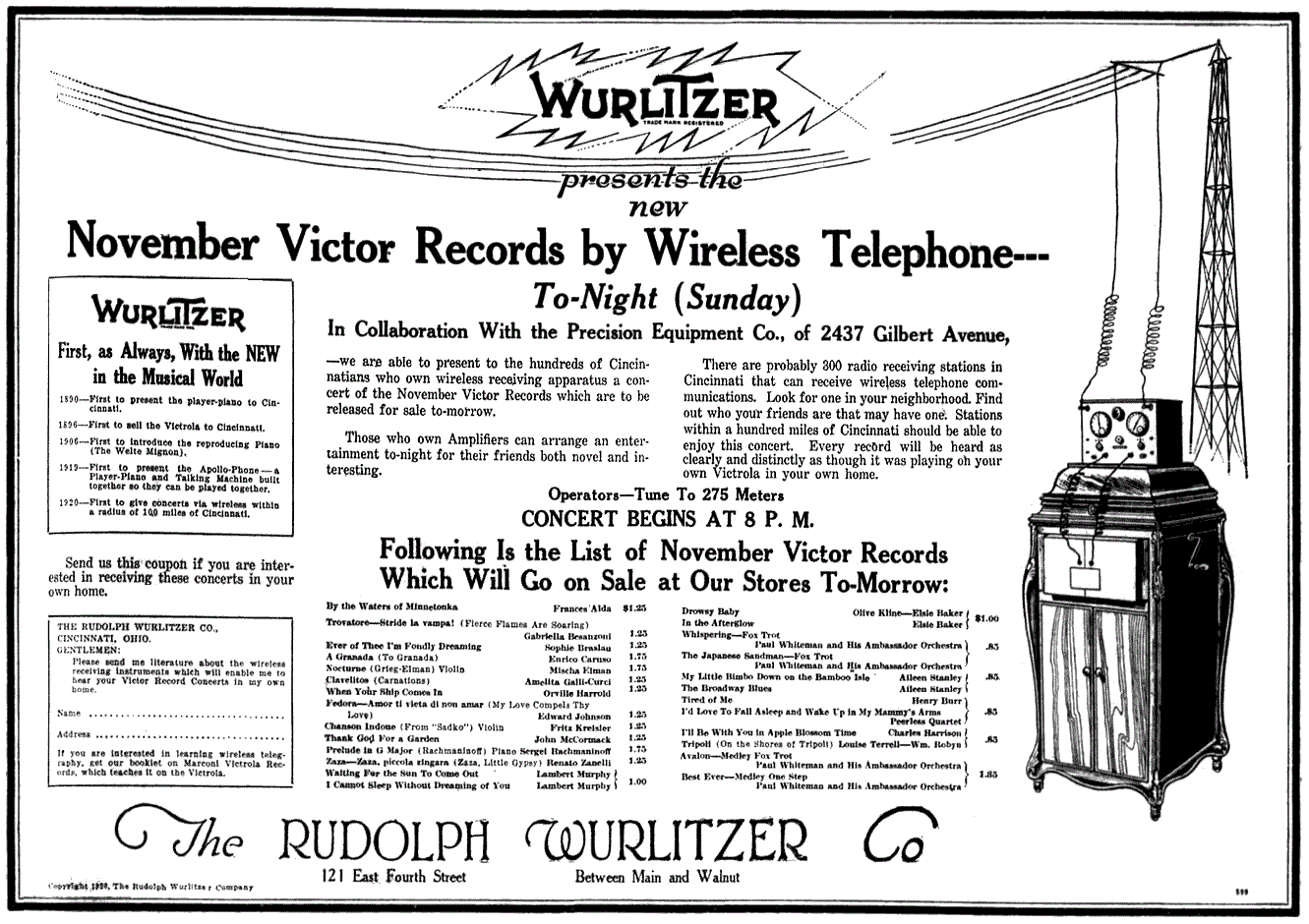
On October 31, 1920, the Rudolph Wurlitzer Company's special concert of Victor phonograph records was carried over 8XB.

Breckel later reported that the inspiration for making entertainment broadcasts come from those made in the summer of 1919 during the transatlantic voyage of the SS George Washington. 8XB's initial transmitter tests primarily consisted of repeated plays of the record "On the 5:15", then, on January 24, 1920, a small newspaper advertisement announced to local amateurs that the company would shortly begin broadcasting radio concerts. On February 2 company president John L. Gates gave the station's first publicized broadcast, consisting of phonograph records. This garnered national attention, and a wire service report quoted Gates as predicting that nationwide broadcasts "will be an innovation of the near future".

The programming offered over 8XB gradually expanded, with a more powerful transmitter constructed in early 1920. A June report stated that the station would provide entertainment for an outing of the Morse Mutual Benefit Association of Telegraphers at Coney Island, including broadcasting a band performance, a speech, baseball scores and other news. At the end of October, a special program playing the latest Victor phonograph records was sponsored by the Rudolph Wurlitzer Company. In early November the station made an election night broadcast, participating with Westinghouse's broadcast of returns from East Pittsburgh, Pennsylvania over station 8ZZ (now KDKA), which included playing Victor records for entertainment.

In July 1921 it was reported that Breckel was presenting concerts on Monday and Wednesday nights "by means of a phonograph and player-piano". The following November the Baldwin Piano Company announced that it was presenting piano concerts on Monday, Wednesday and Saturday evenings in conjunction with Precision Equipment, and that "Hundreds of Wireless Stations within a radius of 300 miles may enjoy these concerts."

== WMH ==
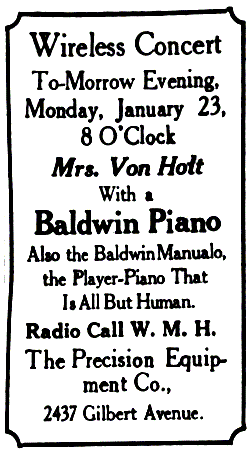
Advertisement for WMH's January 23, 1922 "Wireless Concert".

Initially there were no formal standards for radio stations making broadcasts for the general public, and a variety of stations, most operating under Experimental or Amateur station licenses, conducted broadcasts on a regular schedule. On December 1, 1921, the U.S. Department of Commerce, which regulated radio at this time, adopted the first regulation formally establishing a broadcasting station category, which set aside the wavelength of 360 meters (833 kHz) for entertainment broadcasts, and 485 meters (619 kHz) for market and weather reports.

On December 30, 1921, Precision Equipment received one of the new broadcasting licenses, with the randomly assigned call sign WMH, which was the first issued for the state of Ohio. The single shared entertainment wavelength of 360 meters meant that stations within a given region had to make timesharing agreements to assign operating timeslots. As of August 7, 1922, WMH's programming ran from 8:15-10:00 p.m, while the second station licensed in Cincinnati, the Crosley Manufacturing Company's WLW, was scheduled from 1-3 p.m.

During its short existence the Precision Equipment Company's most prominent customer was industrialist Powel Crosley Jr., who visited the store on February 22, 1921, interested in buying a radio receiver for his son, only to balk at the quoted $135 price. Crosley instead purchased parts to construct his own set, which later led to his Crosley Manufacturing Company producing a line of affordable receivers. However, one important asset that Precision Equipment had which Crosley badly needed was a license to use the Armstrong regeneration circuit patent. Therefore, in early 1923 Crosley arranged to purchase Precision, which was technically the surviving entity in the resulting merger with Crosley's company, and was subsequently renamed the Crosley Radio Company.

Crosley already owned broadcasting station WLW, so following the merger operation of WMH was discontinued. The station's final broadcast took place on January 8, 1923, after which it was reported "its concert nights will be taken over by WLW". A few months later the Commerce Department reported that WMH had been reassigned to 1210 kHz, but there is no evidence that the station actually ever resumed operations, and it was formally deleted on December 11, 1923.

In early 1924, station WFBW (now WKRC), also in Cincinnati, changed its call letters to WMH, apparently as a tribute to the original WMH, however the two stations were not directly linked.

== Pioneer status ==
In 1924 Harry F. Breckel predicted that 8XB "will go down in history as having been the first radiocasting station conceived, designed and placed in operation for the specific purpose of radiocasting entertainment matter and the like, for the express benefit of the radio listeners of the United States". However, the exact date that the station began regular broadcasts is not clear. In addition, there were a number of other stations, some dating to before World War I, which made similar claims. Two of these include:

- Charles "Doc" Herrold, in San Jose, California, who began test transmissions in 1909, which were followed by weekly concerts beginning in 1912.
- Lee de Forest's "Highbridge station" (2XG) in New York City began transmitting regularly scheduled programs beginning in late 1916. These programs were suspended in April 1917 with the entry of the United States into World War I, but after the war the 2XG broadcasts resumed in late 1919. The broadcasts were again suspended in early 1920, the result of a run-in with the local Radio Inspector. At this point the station's transmitter was transferred to San Francisco, and relicensed as 6XC, the "California Theater Station", which around April 1920 inaugurated a wide-ranging selection of daily broadcasts. The next year de Forest wrote that this was the "first radio-telephone station devoted solely" to broadcasting to the public.

== See also ==
- List of initial AM-band station grants in the United States
