= WGI (radio station) =

Radio station in Medford Hillside, Massachusetts (1919–1927)

Coordinates: 42.40847°N 71.11901°W

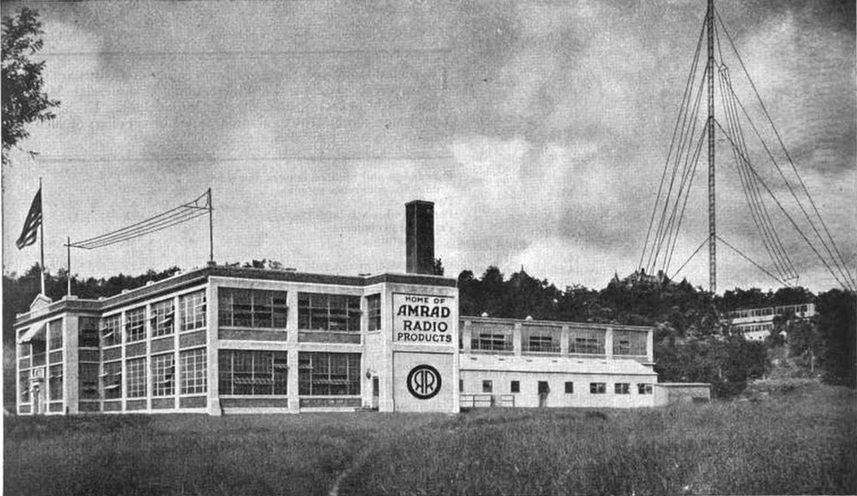
"Main Factory of the American Radio and Research Corporation. Medford Hillside, Mass. Home of Amrad Radio. Showing at extreme right Research and Engineering Laboratories and Broadcasting Station WGI, the Pioneer Radiophone for Broadcasting to the Layman Public." (Caption from 1922 company advertisement)

WGI was an early radio broadcasting station, licensed to the American Radio and Research Corporation (AMRAD) of Medford Hillside, Massachusetts. WGI received its initial broadcasting license on February 7, 1922. However, the station had previously made regular broadcasts under an experimental license as 1XE, which were the first organized broadcasts in the Boston area.

WGI was widely known as "The AMRAD station", and initially gained national prominence for its innovative programs. However, AMRAD soon faced severe financial problems that curtailed the station's operations. In early 1925 the call letters briefly changed to WARC, but within a few weeks the station suspended operations when the parent company filed for bankruptcy. WARC would continue to be listed on the government rosters of active stations for two more years, but it never actually resumed broadcasting before being formally deleted in early 1927.

== Early history ==
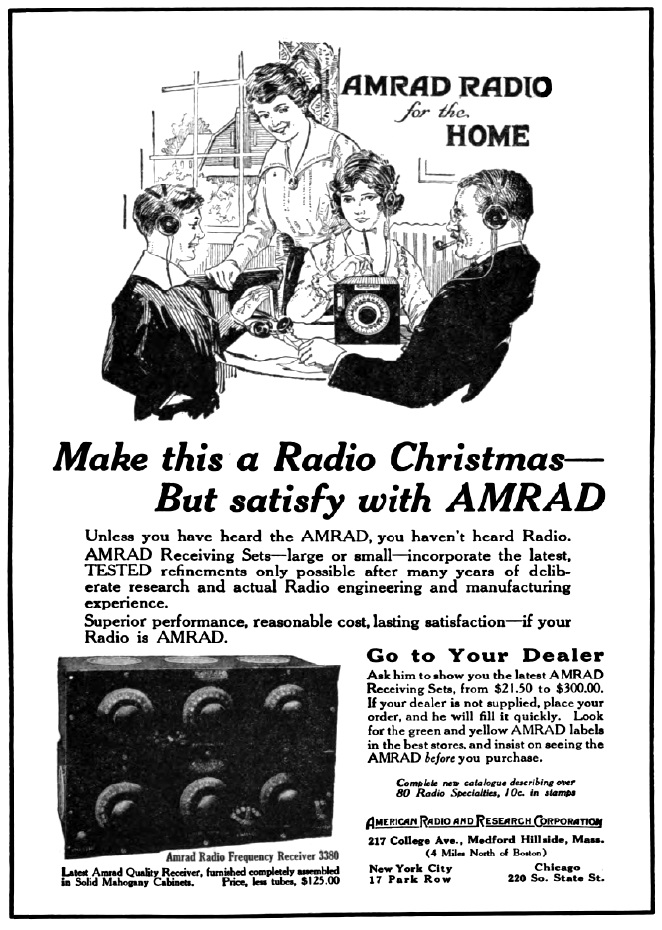
Advertisement for AMRAD radio receivers (1922)

The American Radio and Research Corporation (AMRAD), which operated WGI, was founded by Harold J. Power (born 1893), who traced his interest in radio (then called "wireless telegraphy") to school lessons about Guglielmo Marconi given in 1904. Power built his first simple coherer radio receiver at his home in Everett, Massachusetts when he was only 10 years old. At the age of 16, he became a commercial operator aboard the steamship Yale, making the Boston to New York run. In order to earn money to attend Tufts College near Boston, Power arranged with the local high school to teach a year-long evening radio course, with the provision that he would not be paid unless at least one of his students went on to qualify as a commercial operator. He continued to teach while attending college, and also worked as a shipboard operator during the summers, in order to fund his education. While at Tufts he helped form the Tufts College Wireless Society, serving as its president. The club built a high-powered spark amateur radio station with the call sign 1JJ, which was located at Paige Hall.

Power graduated from Tufts in 1914 with a degree in engineering. The next year he and several fellow Tufts graduates founded AMRAD, which was described as dedicated to improving existing receiver design and advancing radio technology. The new company, with Power the president, was headquartered in a small building on Tufts' Medford Hillside campus. The attempted construction of an unusually tall radio tower at the site suffered an embarrassing collapse onto adjacent train tracks; it was replaced by a shorter structure.

During the first two decades of radio development, transmissions were primarily made by spark-gap transmitters, which were only capable of sending Morse code dots-and-dashes. Power recognized the importance of the recent invention of vacuum tube transmitters, which could be used for audio transmissions. He also employed an imaginative demonstration to publicize his work for a key investor. Power was well known by the family of the famed millionaire John Pierpont Morgan, having previously worked as a radio operator aboard the family's steam yacht Corsair. On March 18, 1916, as the Philadelphia approached the United States from a European voyage with banker J. P. Morgan, Jr. aboard, Power contacted the ship by radiotelephone and over a three hour period transmitted a concert to showcase his radiotelephone transmitter. The younger Morgan was duly impressed, and became AMRAD's primary sponsor.

== Experimental station 1XE ==
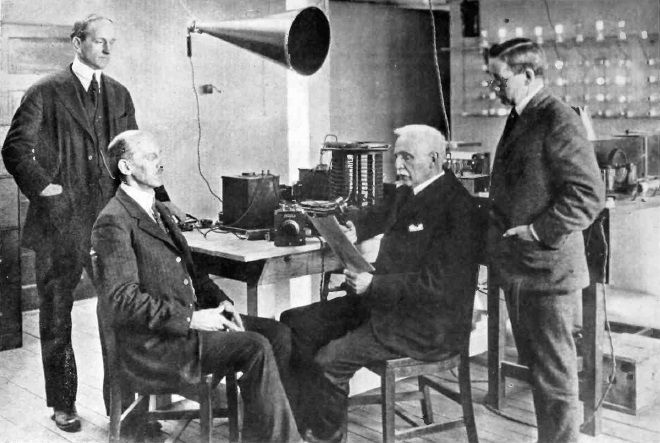
Tufts professor Edward H. Rockwell broadcasting an educational lecture over WGI (1922)

AMRAD began operating an experimental station, 1XE, in 1917. After the United States entered World War One, an executive order issued on April 7, 1917 made it illegal for civilians to possess working radio receivers, and the government took control of most of the radio industry. During the conflict AMRAD received several profitable military contracts, and appears to have been one of the few civilian organizations allowed to conduct radio transmissions during the war. On February 21, 1919, a few months before the October 1919 lifting of the general ban on civilian transmitters, AMRAD announced that it would attempt to establish two-way radiotelephone communication with the George Washington as it approached Boston with President Woodrow Wilson aboard.

1XE was revived after the conclusion of the war, and the station reportedly began experimental voice and music broadcasts in 1919. However, information about any entertainment broadcasts, both before and immediately after World War One, is very limited. In 1930, one former employee remembered "playing phonograph records and reading jokes out of magazines in between pieces" beginning in the late summer of 1920. A report in the November 21, 1920 Boston Globe reported that as a demonstration "a concert by radiophone will be given from the Medford radio station" the next day, and a month later Filene's department store advertised the sale of radio receivers that were "a creation of a company out in Medford", and which had been used to listen "to a concert given in Medford". However, during this period the broadcasts appear to have been irregularly conducted. AMRAD's primary focus after the war was adopting the radiotelephone for personal communication, and a November 1920 article about the company in the Boston Sunday Post reviewed the possibility of using wireless telephones for communication, particularly in automobiles, but didn't make any references to broadcasting activities.

AMRAD's business was initially oriented toward government contracts and the small amateur radio market. This focus would radically change with the development of the "broadcasting boom" in the early 1920s, which by the end of 1922 saw the establishment of over 500 broadcasting stations in the United States. As part of this trend, the amount of programming broadcast over 1XE was expanded, in part to generate interest in receivers sold by AMRAD. A notable development was the adoption of a daily schedule beginning on May 21, 1921, when 1XE began broadcasting, each evening at 7:20 p.m., "information as to fugitives, stolen automobiles, and similar information of interest to outlying police" that had been collected at Boston police headquarters for dissemination by the radio station. Music was also included with these broadcasts.

== WGI ==
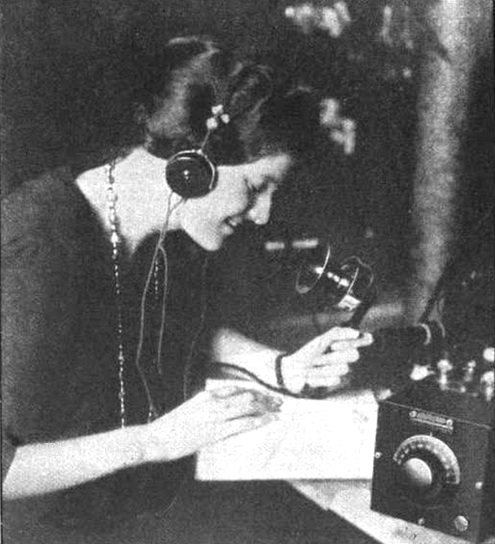
Eunice Randall was an AMRAD engineer who in the summer of 1922 read children's stories on Tuesday and Thursday nights for WGI.

WGI schedule for January 22, 1923 (360 meters)
5 p. m.—Children's hour.
5.30 p. m.—Closing report on farmers' produce market (transmitted on 485 meters)
6 p. m.—Late news flashes.
6.30 p.m.—Boston police reports. Boston Police headquarters.
6:45 p.m—"Bank Aid in the Extension of Business" by Alston H. Garside.

The Department of Commerce was responsible for regulating radio at this time, and initially there were no formal regulations about stations making broadcasts intended for the general public. Responding to an increase in the number of stations, especially amateur, that were making entertainment broadcasts, the department promulgated a new rule, effective December 1, 1921, that broadcasting stations would now have to hold a Limited Commercial license which included an authorization to use one or both of two newly designated broadcasting wavelengths: 360 meters (833 kHz) for "entertainment" and 485 meters (619 meters) for "market and weather reports". AMRAD applied for this new license for its station, which was issued on February 7, 1922 with the randomly assigned call letters of WGI, and authorized the use of 360 meters. This was the second broadcasting station license issued in Massachusetts, following Westinghouse's WBZ in East Springfield, although AMRAD personnel were quick to point out that its broadcasts over 1XE had started months before WBZ began operating.

Station employees were willingly drafted to provide programming during the evenings the station was on the air, including Eunice Randall, who read children's stories from The Youth's Companion. Eddie Dunham later took over this role, and allegedly palmed an extra $5 weekly fee given to him by the publishers in exchange for providing additional promotion for the magazine. In April 1922 it was announced that thirteen members of the Tufts faculty had volunteered to give lectures over WGI, which was thought to be the first use of radio to present college lectures.

Longtime Boston radio and TV personality Bob "Big Brother" Emery began his career at WGI. However, in the summer of 1924 it was announced that Emery, who had been the program director and most prominent performer, was leaving the station to take a position at a new station, WEEI, being constructed by the Edison Light Company.

== WARC ==
AMRAD had a reputation for being poorly managed. Despite its early experience in the radio field, it had difficulty keeping up with advances, especially in the production of receivers for the general public. This led to significant financial losses when it tried to sell large quantities of out-of-date equipment. J. P. Morgan, Jr. reportedly invested, fruitlessly, $800,000 in the company.

In early 1925 WGI's call letters were changed to WARC, in order "to avoid confusion with stations with nearly similar names [most likely the powerful WGY in nearby Schenectady, New York] and also to work the name of the parent company into the call letters", and the station made its first broadcast using the new call sign on the evening of March 17, 1925. But station operations were suspended three weeks later, when, on April 7, 1925, AMRAD filed for bankruptcy, with estimated debts of $500,000 versus assets of $192,000. It was announced that Tufts College had purchased the company's land, property and radio station, and arranged a five-year lease of the assets back to AMRAD to allow it to continue operations.

Although there would be occasional statements that WARC's broadcasts would be restarted, the station appears to have permanently gone off the air at this time. In December 1925 Powel Crosley purchased the AMRAD assets out of bankruptcy. In addition to resuming factory production, it was said there were plans to resume WARC's operation "before many weeks", using a new 500-watt transmitter. In late February it was further reported that the station would be back on the air with an improved antenna system "just as soon as a suitable location for a Boston studio has been found". And in August 1926, it was announced that Crosley was planning to establish a shortwave transmitter that would be used to relay programs from its station in Cincinnati, Ohio, WLW, for retransmission by WARC. However, there is no sign that the station ever returned to the airwaves. Finally, in May 1927 the Boston Herald noted that WARC was "definitely out of business", as it was one of 30 stations nationally that had failed to apply with the recently established Federal Radio Commission for a license to remain on the air.

== Priority status ==
In early 1922 Harold Power was quoted as stating that "In the spring of 1921 we started the world's first daily regular broadcasting schedule". The article in which this statement appeared additionally asserted that "With the growing importance of radio many are claiming to have originated broadcasting and doubtless radio engineers and others considered it, but it is Harold J. Power to whom credit belongs for not only having the idea, but actually carrying it into execution."

However, there are well documented examples of earlier organized broadcasting, including some on a daily basis that occurred prior to 1XE's inauguration of its own daily schedule. Activities in the United States included:

- In San Jose, California, Charles Herrold conducted regular weekly broadcasts beginning as early as 1912. This station was the forerunner of today's KCBS.
- Lee de Forest provided regular broadcasts from his "Highbridge" experimental station, 2XG in New York City, during 1916-1917 (including a widely heard election night broadcast in November 1916), and after the war resumed the broadcasts from 1919-1920.
- De Forest later transferred 2XG's transmitter to San Francisco, where it was relicensed as 6XC, and, as the "California Theater" station, conducted daily transmissions beginning around April 1920.
- The Detroit News' station, the "Detroit News Radiophone", began daily programming (initially as 8MK) in August 1920. This station was the forerunner of today's WWJ.
- AMRAD staff displayed a special desire to claim priority over Westinghouse's KDKA, and apparently were unaware of most of the broadcasting activities that had taken place prior to the establishment of either station. An example was a letter, written by AMRAD advertising manager H. M. Taylor, which appeared in the April 29, 1922 issue of Radio World. Challenging a short publicity review appearing in that magazine's April 8 issue, which described KDKA as "The First Broadcaster", Taylor asserted that "It is true KDKA was the first to broadcast Sunday church services regularly, but this cörporation, operating a station in Medford Hillside, 1XE, was the first to broadcast a regular daily schedule, when police reports for the City of Boston were sent out every night together with musical programs. This 'first' business is a mighty hard thing to prove. DeForest was broadcasting intermittently in 1915, and so were we. KDKA was the first to broadcast weekly, but we were the first to broadcast daily, which is quite a difference." (The next issue of the magazine made amends by running a biography of Harold Power, that featured a full page photograph with the caption "His realization of the universal importance of radio broadcasting led to the establishment of the world's first station in 1921.") Taylor apparently believed that, following its debut on November 2, 1920 (initially as 8ZZ), KDKA had broadcast only on Sundays for an extended period of time. However, KDKA actually inaugurated daily programming on December 21, 1920, several months before the May 21, 1921 start of 1XE's daily police report service.
- Other existing radio stations which claim pre-1920 roots include WGY Schenectady, New York (founded by General Electric) and KGFX Pierre, South Dakota (both claiming circa 1915 as start up dates) as well as The University of Wisconsin station WHA in Madison, Wisconsin (circa 1916).

== See also ==
- List of initial AM-band station grants in the United States
