= Charles Herrold =

American inventor and radio broadcaster

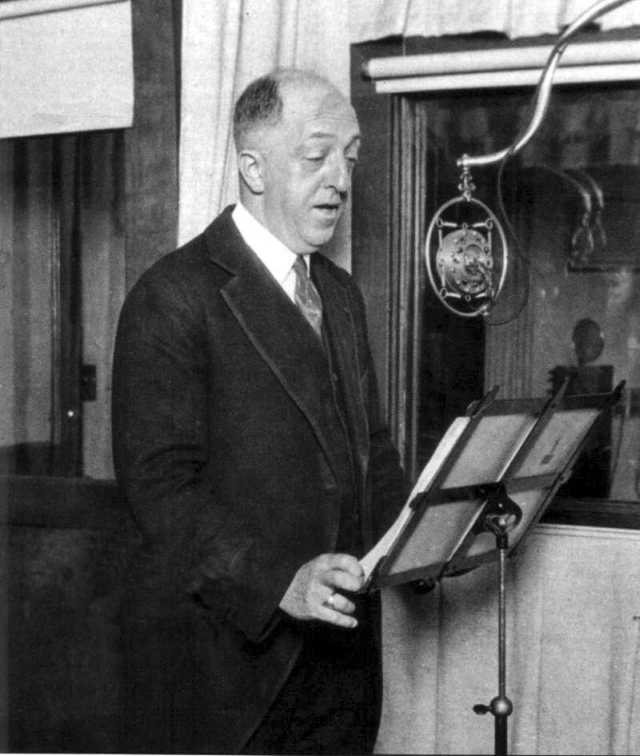
"Doc" Herrold at the KQW microphone, early 1920s

Charles David "Doc" Herrold (November 16, 1875 – July 1, 1948) was an American inventor and pioneer radio broadcaster, who began experimenting with audio radio transmissions in 1909. Beginning in 1912 he apparently became the first person to make entertainment broadcasts on a regular schedule, from his station in San Jose, California.

== Early life ==
Born in Fulton, Illinois, Herrold grew up in San Jose. In 1895 he enrolled in Stanford University, where he studied astronomy and physics for three years, but withdrew due to illness and never graduated. While at Stanford he was inspired by reports of Guglielmo Marconi's demonstrations that radio signals could be used for wireless communication, and began to experiment with the new technology.

After recovering from his illness, Herrold moved to San Francisco, where he developed a number of inventions for dentistry, surgery, and underwater illumination. However, the April 18, 1906 San Francisco earthquake destroyed his work site and apartment. He next took an engineering teaching position for three years, at Heald's College of Mining and Engineering in Stockton, California. While there, his various research projects included the remote detonation of mines using radio signals. During this time he received further inspiration from the novel Looking Backward by Edward Bellamy, which foresaw the transmission of entertainment programming over telephone lines to individual homes. Herrold began to speculate about the possibilities of instead using radio signals to distribute the programming more efficiently.

The original spark-gap transmitters used for radio signalling could only transmit Morse code messages. Even with this limitation, there was some broadcasting by early radio stations, beginning in 1905 with daily noon time signals transmitted by U.S. Naval stations. Although these broadcasts generated interest among amateur radio operators, especially after they were expanded to include daily weather forecasts and news summaries, the need to learn Morse code greatly restricted potential audiences.

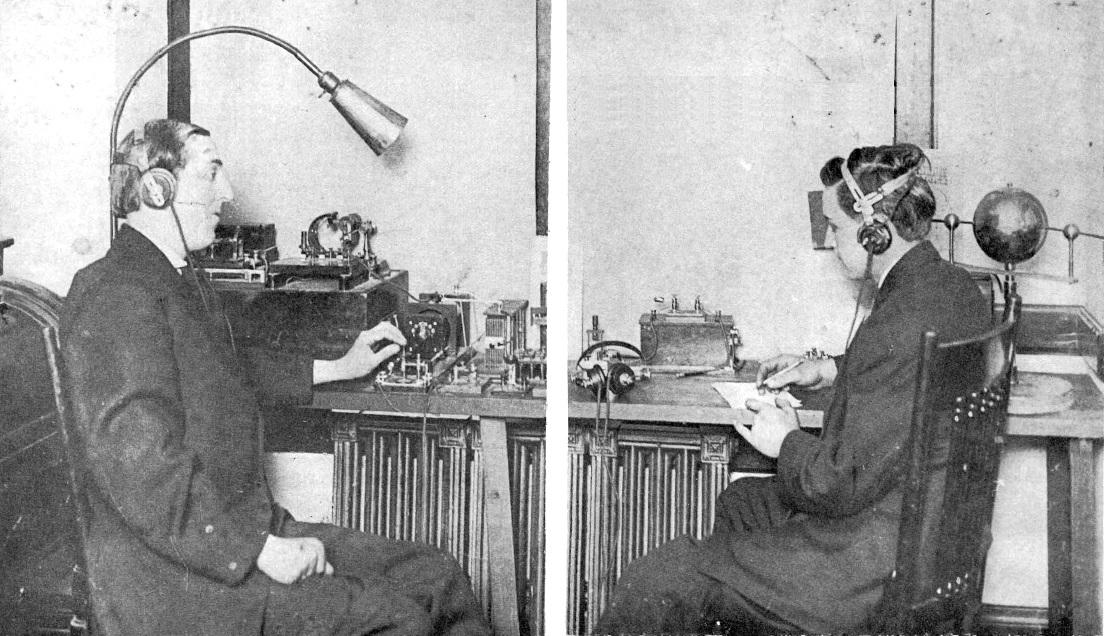
Charles Herrold and assistant Ray Newby (circa 1910)

To realize his idea of distributing entertainment by radio, Herrold first needed to perfect a radiotelephone transmitter. He was not unique in this endeavor. Although he would later claim that only he had conceived of entertainment broadcasting, there were actually a few others who had speculated about the possibilities. On December 21, 1906, Reginald Fessenden demonstrated an alternator-transmitter of his own design, and one reviewer noted that it was "admirably adapted to the transmission of news, music, etc. as, owing to the fact that no wires are needed, simultaneous transmission to many subscribers can be effected as easily as to a few". However, Fessenden would almost exclusively focus on point-to-point transmissions intended to supplement the wire telephone system.

Lee de Forest was even more ambitious, although Herrold would later incorrectly assert that "Certainly de Forest had no thought of a broadcast". As early as June 1907, a review of de Forest's test of his version of a Valdemar Poulsen arc transmitter noted that "the inventor believes that by using four different forms of wave as many classes of music can be sent out as desired by the different subscribers". De Forest made a series of musical demonstrations from 1907 to 1910, although he would not actually begin regular broadcasts until 1916, when vacuum-tube transmitters became available.

== Radio development pre-WWI ==
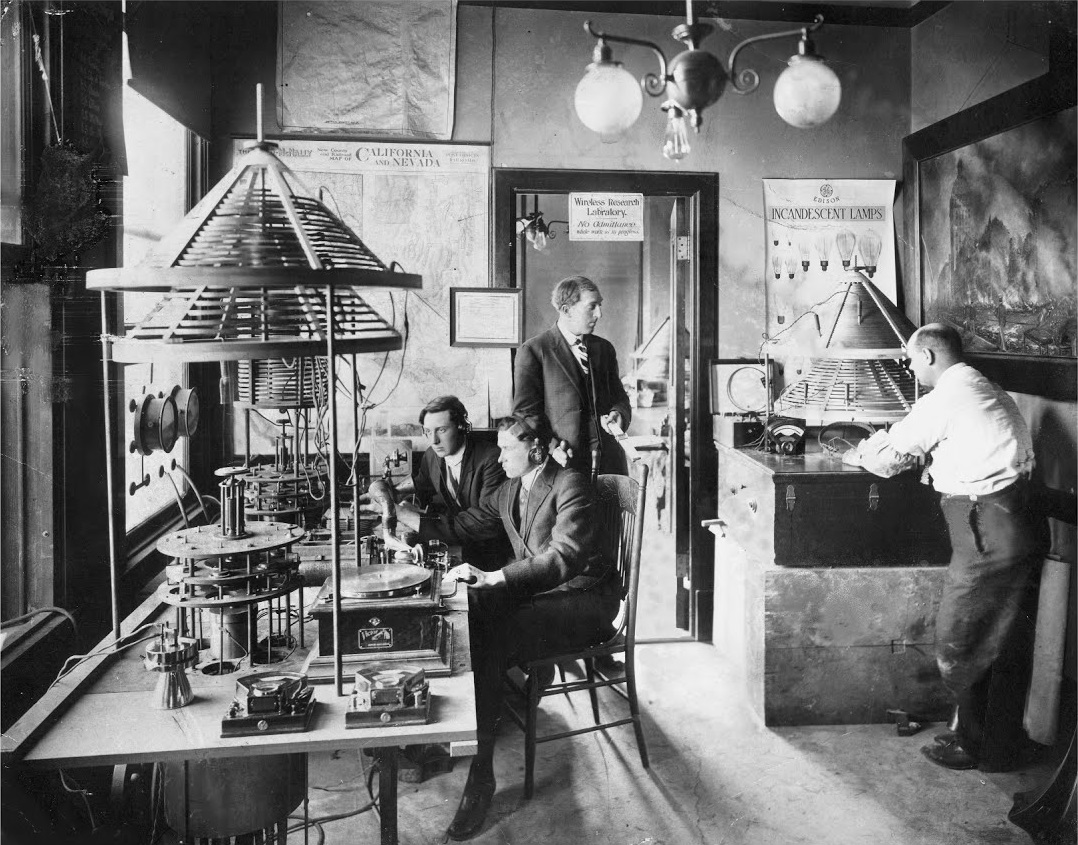
Photograph of Charles Herrold's San Jose California radio laboratory, circa 1912. Herrold is standing in the doorway.

On January 1, 1909, Herrold opened the Herrold College of Wireless and Engineering, located in the Garden City Bank Building at 50 West San Fernando Street in San Jose, where a huge "umbrella-style" antenna was constructed atop the building. The college's primary purpose was to train radio operators, for handling communications aboard ship or staffing shore stations. Although he would never get a degree, Herrold became known as "Doc" as a sign of his student's respect. Ray Newby, just 16 years old, acted as his primary assistant. At the time Herrold began his work, there was no regulation of radio stations in the United States, and the station was identified by self-assigned call letters, including FN and SJN. Later the Radio Act of 1912 mandated the licensing of stations, and Herrold was issued a license for an Experimental station in late 1915, with the call sign 6XF.

Herrold's primary radiotelephone effort was toward developing a commercial system suitable for point-to-point service. Working with Ray Newby, he initially used high-frequency spark transmitters. In a June 23, 1910 notarized letter that was published in a catalog produced by the Electro Importing Company of New York, Herrold reported that, using one of that company's spark coils, he had successfully broadcast "wireless phone concerts to local amateur wireless men". However, the limitations of the high-frequency spark soon became apparent, and he switched to developing refined versions of the Poulsen arc, which was more stable and had better audio fidelity.

In early 1912, Herrold was hired as chief engineer of the National Wireless Telephone and Telegraph Company in San Francisco. With hopes that they could develop a highly profitable point-to-point "arc fone" radiotelephone, he produced a system with good quality audio—colloquially described as "shaving the whiskers off the wireless telephone"—although relatively low powered. A number of successful tests for the U.S. Navy were reported, however, a conflict soon arose between Herrold and the company, and in late 1913 he both resigned and sued NWT&T on the grounds that he had not been fully compensated for his time and effort. NWT&T counter-claimed that it had met the terms of its contract and moreover "most of the improvements made by Herrold were ultimately abandoned by the company". The judge sided with NWT&T and denied Herrold's claim. In addition, despite his attempts to create a transmission system that didn't infringe on the Poulsen arc patents, there were doubts that he had actually achieved this goal.

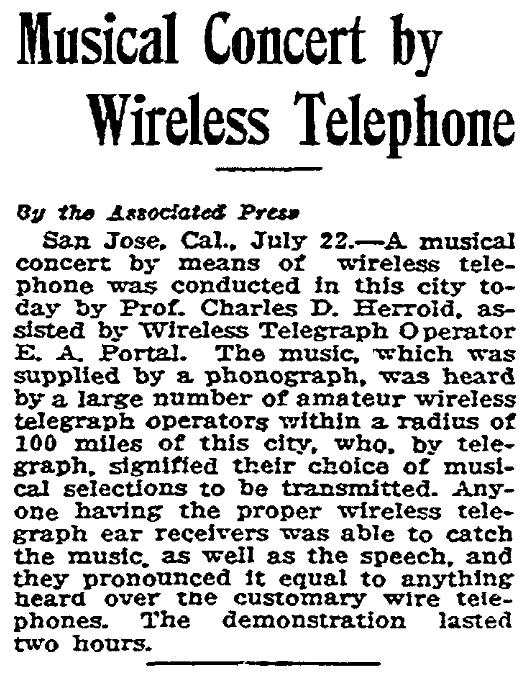
Contemporary review of a July 22, 1912 broadcast.

Concurrent with his work for NWT&T, in July 1912 Herrold began making regular radio broadcasts on a weekly basis from his San Jose school, with an initial broadcast featuring phonograph records supplied by the Wiley B. Allen company. Herrold's wife at the time, Sybil, later recounted that she participated in the Wednesday night programs, where she broadcast recordings from the Sherman, Clay record store that had been requested by "the little hams" (amateur radio enthusiasts) who comprised her audience. Herrold's ultimate transmitter design employed a water-cooled microphone connected to six small arcs burning in liquid alcohol. A review of a Christmas 1916 concert complimented the good audio quality of the "Herrold-Portal aerial system of telephony", reporting that "It was as sweet and beautiful as if it had been played and sung in the next room".

Despite the popularity of the broadcasts, they drew only local attention, and were largely unknown outside of the immediate San Jose area. Moreover, the broadcasts came to an end on April 6, 1917, when all civilian station operations were suspended as a result of the entry by the United States into World War I. After dismantling the station, which included removing the antenna system from atop the bank building, Herrold relocated his school to 467 South First Street, a site which also included retail space.

== World War One ==
Although during the war the school no longer had an operational radio station, there was an extensive need for radio operators, so recruits were trained using Omnigraphs for Morse code instruction. Herrold would later advertise that the school's "war record" consisted of "200 Men Trained—130 Placed in Service". At the same time extensive advances were being made in radio transmitter design, with the new equipment employing vacuum-tube technology. Since Herrold had been refining now outdated arc-based systems, much of his technical knowledge was becoming obsolete.

== Radio development post-World War One ==
Effective October 1, 1919, the wartime ban on civilian radio stations was lifted. Herrold renewed his two expired licenses, 6XE for portable operations in the fall of 1920, and 6XF, a standard Experimental license, in the spring of 1921. There were still no formal requirements for stations wishing to broadcast entertainment to the general public, and pioneer broadcasting activities, now using vacuum-tube equipment, were being started independently at scattered sites.

One of Herrold's first tasks after the end of the war was to become familiar with vacuum-tube equipment. Although some of his associates later thought that he resumed regular broadcasts as early as 1919, there is no record of him returning to the airwaves prior to early May 1921, presumably over 6XF, when an announcement was made that his school would begin programs on Monday and Thursday nights, playing records supplied by "J. A. Kerwin of 84 East Santa Clara street, dealer in phonographs".

== Broadcasting station KQW (later KCBS) ==
The government eventually adopted a regulation, which took effect on December 1, 1921, requiring that persons wanting to transmit entertainment to the general public had to obtain a Limited Commercial license. Thus, on December 9, 1921, a license with the randomly assigned call sign of KQW was issued in the name of Charles D. Herrold in San Jose. Operation of the broadcasting station was financed by sales of radio equipment by the Herrold Radio Laboratory, but by 1925 the costs for KQW had grown burdensome, and the station was transferred to the First Baptist Church of San Jose. Two conditions of the reassignment were that Herrold be kept on as program director, and the station's sign-ons include the statement: "This is KQW, pioneer broadcasting station of the world, founded by Dr. Charles D. Herrold in San Jose in 1909".

However, at the end of 1926 Herrold's contract with the station which he had founded would not be renewed. A few months later he started working for station KTAB in Oakland, California, primarily in sales. Herrold did not profit financially from his pioneering work, and later became a repair technician in the Oakland, California school district, and a janitor in a local shipyard. Almost forgotten, he died in a Hayward, California rest home on July 1, 1948, aged 72.

In the 1940s, CBS attempted to buy its then-affiliate in San Francisco, KSFO (the former KTAB). KSFO refused to sell, so CBS purchased KQW and moved it to San Francisco, changing the call letters to KCBS on April 3, 1949. In May 2006, KCBS and KPIX-TV moved their San Jose news bureau to the Fairmont Tower at 50 West San Fernando Street, the location of Herrold's original broadcasts. Although CBS management was not aware of the history of the San Fernando Street address when the move was planned, they quickly recognized and embraced its significance when informed at the bureau's opening celebration.

== Legacy ==
Herrold sought recognition for his pioneering broadcasts, but with limited success while he was alive. There is general agreement that his San Jose station was the first to transmit entertainment broadcasts on a regular basis, dating back to at least 1912, thus giving him a legitimate claim to the self-proclaimed title of "Father of (audio) Broadcasting". More problematic is whether to also credit KCBS as the "world's oldest broadcasting station", which requires considering it to be "the direct lineal descendant" of Herrold's pre-war broadcasting activities. The main issue is Herrold's apparent delay in returning to broadcasting after World War I. A number of stations were already making regular broadcasts in 1920, including some in the nearby San Francisco Bay region, beginning in February 1920 with Emil Portal's broadcast of an orchestra concert from the Fairmont hotel in San Francisco. Thus, by restarting in May 1921 Herrold appears to have been merely rejoining the broadcasting ranks, rather than maintaining a continuous presence.

Since 1978, the California Historical Radio Society has awarded an annual "Charles D. 'Doc' Herrold Award", in recognition of "Outstanding Achievement in the Preservation and Documentation of Early Radio".
