= Charles Carrell =

American radio pioneer

Charles Lewis "C. L." Carrell
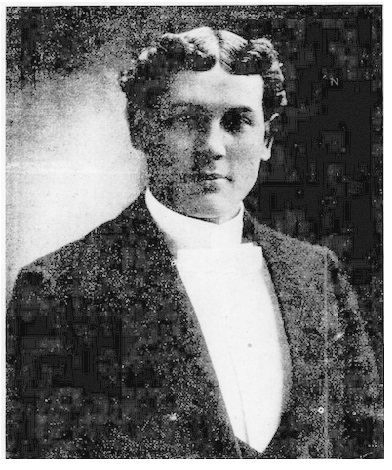
- Carrell in 1902
- Born: 1875
- Died: December 11, 1933 (aged 58); Chicago, Illinois, U.S.
- Known for: Theater promoter, Professional radio
- Spouse: Adelaide Lillian Carrell
- Children: 3

Charles Lewis "C. L." Carrell (1875-December 11, 1933) was a Chicago-based theater and talent promoter. Beginning in 1925, Carrell became the licensee for seven portable radio stations, which were sent to small towns in the midwest for limited runs, normally of a few weeks, to provide entertainment to localities that did not have their own stations.

In 1928, the Federal Radio Commission (FRC) announced it would no longer license portable stations. Responding to this directive, four of Carrell's stations were placed in permanent locations. The other three stations were deleted, and Carrell turned to the federal courts in an unsuccessful attempt to have them restored. These legal cases upheld the deletions, and helped to establish the FRC's authority to make decisions needed to effectively regulate broadcasting stations under the Radio Act of 1927.

== Biography ==
=== Theater and talent promoter ===
Carrell was active in the entertainment industry, including work as a band director in Kansas. In the late 1910s, he founded Carrell's Theatrical Agency in Chicago, which arranged bookings for vaudeville performers in various midwest theaters.

=== Radio station operations ===
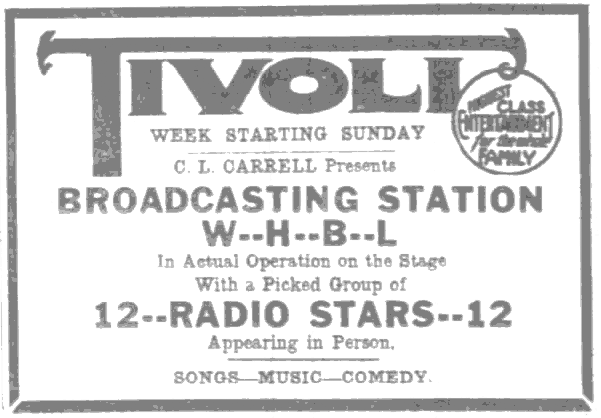
Based in Chicago, Carrell began portable station operations in 1925. This advertisement promoted a broadcast in South Bend, Indiana by one of his stations.

Organized radio broadcasting in the United States was developed in the early 1920s. Although virtually all of the earliest stations operated from fixed locations, a small number were licensed as "portables", that were permitted to regularly change to new sites.

Starting with the licensing of WHBM in the spring of 1925, Carrell became the person most associated with portable broadcasting stations. He expanded his holdings with the licensing of stations WIBJ and WKBG, acquisition of portable station WIBM, originally licensed to Billy Maine, and the purchase of three standard central Indiana stations — WBBZ, WHBL and WIBW — which were converted into portables. Thus, by the end of 1926, Carrell had a roster of seven stations, leased out through the C. L. Carrell Broadcasting Service, with their base generally listed as 1536 South State Street, the Chicago location of Carrell's Theatrical Agency.

Carrell commonly used his portable stations, in conjunction with small-town theaters, to provide entertainment programs that featured radio personalities from major cities, which were broadcast by one of his stations to the local community. A May 1925 Logansport, Indiana event, broadcast by Carrell's WHBL, was advertised as: "Starting Sunday, May 24, 4 days, C. L. Carrell Brings to Logansport a New Radio Frolic. All New Radio Stars in a New Musical Review with a Broadcasting Station In Actual Operation on the Luna Stage". A February 1926 advertisement for WBBZ's visit to Manitowoc, Wisconsin invited the curious to: "Come See---Hear, and be taken into the mysteries of radio broadcasting". Over time Carrell's stations began staying in individual communities for longer periods, and included local entertainers, in part to judge whether establishing a permanent station was financially viable.

As the number of permanently located stations increased, the portables began to be seen as a nuisance, as their mobility made it difficult to control the interference they caused to other stations transmitting on the same frequency. The Federal Radio Commission (FRC) was formed in early 1927, and was charged with bringing stability to the sometimes chaotic state of the AM broadcast band. As part of its efforts, on April 26, 1927, it released General Order 6, which stated that "Since the exact location of any radio broadcasting transmitter is an essential feature of the license, the Federal Radio Commission, as already announced, will not consider any application for a broadcasting license, except for a very limited period of time, in which the permanent location of the transmitter is not specified." The order also limited portable station license periods to no more than 120 days, with the further restriction that they would be limited to operating "with not more than 100 watts power output", and would only be assigned to one of two transmitting frequencies, either 1470 kHz or 1490 kHz.

A further constraint was the Davis Amendment provision attached to the March 28, 1928 reauthorization of the Radio Act of 1927, which mandated an "equality of radio broadcasting service" within the United States. The ability of portable stations to relocate between states and regional zones made their compliance with this additional restriction problematical. Subsequently, the FRC's General Order 30, adopted May 10, 1928, specified that all portable stations which had not found permanent homes would have to cease operating by July 1. Fifteen days later, General Order 34 restated the coming prohibition, noting that there were currently eleven active portable stations, whose licenses would expire as of 3 a.m. July 1, 1928.

Following the FRC's announcement that it was eliminating portable stations, Carrell procured permanent locations for four of the stations — WBBZ (Ponca City, Oklahoma), WHBL (Sheboygan, Wisconsin), WIBM (Jackson, Michigan), and WIBW (Topeka, Kansas) — however the other three, WHBM, WIBJ and WKBG, were eventually deleted. He petitioned the FRC to reverse the deletions, but was turned down. He then appealed the decision to the District of Columbia Court of Appeals, which also ruled against him, stating:

"It is contended on behalf of the Commission that the licensing of portable broadcasting stations is not in the public interest, convenience, or necessity; that the Davis Amendment to the Radio Act of 1927 (45 Stat. 373) contemplates fixed allocation of broadcasting stations, and its mandate cannot be carried out if roving transmitters are allowed to operate; that under the allocation of stations as at present established the operation of migratory transmitters would result in harmful interference; that the difficulties of supervision of portable stations render it against public interest to license them; and that to permit portable broadcasting stations to rove at will over a portion of the country on any one broadcasting channel would deprive the public of the service of that channel to its full capacity. We think that the Commission acted within its authority when dealing with portable stations as a class... The order appealed from is accordingly affirmed at the cost of appellant."

Carrell was also unable to convince the FRC to reactivate the station licenses so that they could be transferred to permanent locations.

=== Later years and death ===
C. L. Carrell went on to manage WBBZ, which had been relocated to Ponca City, Oklahoma. He died in Chicago on December 11, 1933, aged 58, following which his widow, Adelaide Lillian Carrell, took over as owner and station manager until 1949.
