= General Order 40 =

1928 American reorganization of radio broadcasting frequencies

The Federal Radio Commission's (FRC) General Order 40, dated August 30, 1928, described the standards for a sweeping reorganization of radio broadcasting in the United States. This order grouped the AM radio band transmitting frequencies into three main categories, which became known as Clear Channel, Regional, and Local. It also included provisions for coordination with Canadian station assignments. The majority of the reassignments resulting from the plan's implementation went into effect on November 11, 1928.

== Background ==
Radio transmissions in the United States were originally regulated by the Department of Commerce, as authorized by the Radio Act of 1912. The first formal regulations governing broadcasts intended for the general public were adopted effective December 1, 1921. This initially established just two transmitting wavelengths: 360 meters (833 kHz) for "entertainment" broadcasts, and 485 meters (619 kHz) for "market news and weather reports". The number of broadcasting stations grew dramatically in 1922, reaching over 500 by the end of the year, and the government began making available additional frequencies. By November 1924 a band of frequencies, from 550 to 1500 kHz, had been established, with higher-powered stations, known as "Class B", assigned to the frequencies from 550 to 1070, while lower-powered "Class A" stations were assigned to 1080 to 1500.

In 1926, the government's regulatory authority under the 1912 Radio Act was successfully challenged, and, for a chaotic period that lasted until early 1927, radio stations were free to use any frequency and power they chose, while the number of stations increased to 732. The Radio Act of 1927 was passed to regain control of the situation. The Act established a Federal Radio Commission, which reduced the number of stations, primarily through its General Order 32, in addition to eliminating "temporary" and "portable" stations. The Commission also reallocated frequency assignments to reduce interference and provide better service to smaller communities and underserved rural areas. A constraint was the Davis Amendment, which specified that the station assignments had to be equitably made throughout the country.

Two technical issues limited the number of stations that could operate without interfering with each other. These issues were especially important at night, when a change in the ionosphere meant that radio signals traveled much greater distances. Most transmitters at this time were unable to precisely control their output frequencies, thus, signals from two stations operating on the same nominal frequency would combine to make a high-pitched "heterodyne" tone that interfered with the reception of both stations. Secondly, directional antennas would not be developed until the early 1930s, so there was no effective method for limiting signals in a given direction.

== General Order 40 provisions ==
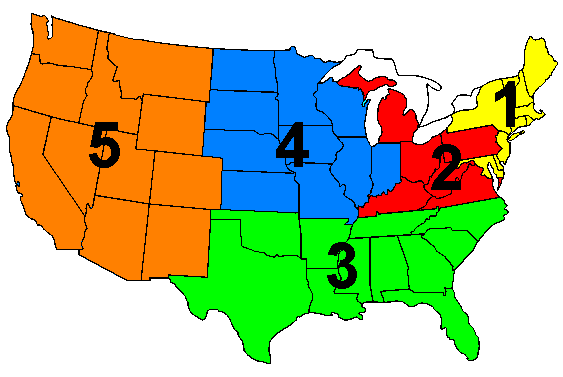
Five U.S. zones used to help ensure stations were equally allocated as required by the Davis Amendment

On August 30, 1928, the Commission issued General Order 40, which set new standards for radio broadcasting. A "broadcast band" was defined, consisting of 96 frequencies, spaced every 10 kilohertz, from 550 to 1500 kHz. Six of them—690, 730, 840, 910, 960, and 1030—were restricted for use only by Canadian stations, leaving 90 available for US assignment. The country was further divided into five zones, to coordinate the Davis Amendment directive of an equitable assignment of stations.

=== Clear channels ===
Forty of the U.S. frequencies—eight in each zone—which came to be known as "Clear Channels", were generally limited nationally to a single station. The maximum power for these stations was to be determined later, and in most cases was set at 50,000 watts. In some cases, secondary stations were assigned the same frequency, with provisions to avoid interference with the primary station's coverage by locating the secondary stations long distances from the primary stations, limiting their power, or restricting them to daytime-only operation.

Due to a lack of Clear Channel frequencies, in several cases two stations were assigned the same frequency and required to share time on them:

- 770 KFAB in Lincoln, Nebraska and WBBM in Chicago, Illinois. To avoid interference, at night KFAB carried the same network programming as WBBM and the stations closely synchronized their transmissions.
- 820 WFAA in Dallas, Texas and WBAP in Fort Worth, Texas. Eventually, these stations also shared a second, regional frequency (570), and until 1970 alternated between the two frequencies every 12 hours.
- 850 KWKH in Shreveport, Louisiana and WWL in New Orleans, Louisiana.
- 870 WLS and WENR, both in Chicago, Illinois. This continued until 1954 when ABC purchased both stations and WENR was deleted.
- 1000 WHO in Des Moines, Iowa and WOC in Davenport, Iowa. Both stations unsuccessfully fought the shared allocation. Initially the two stations transmitted the same programs using synchronized transmitters, but eventually WHO bought out WOC and consolidated operations as WHO-WOC in Des Moines. Still later WOC was split-off, leaving just WHO.
- 1060 WBAL in Baltimore, Maryland and WTIC in Hartford, Connecticut.
- 1160 WOWO in Fort Wayne, Indiana and WWVA in Wheeling, West Virginia.

Zone 5 Clear Channel frequency 790 kHz was assigned to General Electric's (GE) KGO in Oakland, California. Because of the separation between the stations, GE's WGY in Schenectady, New York was also assigned this frequency, but with KGO's power limited to 7,500 watts, until a directional antenna became feasible and KGO's power could be raised to 50,000 watts. KGO is the General Order 40 station on 790/810 kHz, not WGY.

Zone 2 Clear Channel frequency 1020 kHz was initially used by a high-powered station in Zone 4, KYW in Chicago, Illinois. This discrepancy was resolved when KYW moved to Philadelphia in 1934, and the Philadelphia station previously on 1020, WRAX, moved to regional frequency 920 kHz, sharing time with WPEN.

=== Regional frequencies ===
Forty-four frequencies, later known as "Regional", were designated to be used concurrently by stations in multiple zones. Forty of these frequencies had power limits of 1,000 watts, while the remaining four, 1460–1490, referred to as "Super Regional", had 5,000-watt limits. In numerous cases up to four stations in a given location were assigned the same frequency, requiring them to establish time-sharing agreements.

=== Local frequencies ===
The remaining six frequencies—1200, 1210, 1310, 1370, 1420 and 1500—later known as "Local", were issued to stations in all five zones, with a power limit of 100 watts.

== Effects ==
The reorganization greatly reduced interference caused by the chaos that resulted from the earlier collapse of regulation. There was some controversy that the assignments had created groups of "have" and "have-not" stations—with the Clear Channel stations receiving a major economic boost, while many remaining stations, often with limited hours due to time-sharing, had constricted futures. Also, although the reorganization accounted for Canada, it did not include other nearby countries, most notably Mexico. Twelve years later this omission was addressed by the North American Regional Broadcasting Agreement (NARBA), which took effect March 29, 1941.

== November 11, 1928 assignments ==
General Order 40's implementation took effect at 3 a.m. Eastern time on November 11, 1928, and required most U.S. radio stations to move to a new broadcast frequency. A survey conducted by Radio Retailing magazine concluded that, despite some continuing issues, the changes meant that "on the whole, the broadcasting situation has been much improved".

The table below presents a general outline of the allocations made under the order. For "Clear" frequencies, the zone of that frequency's principal station is listed, followed by the principal station's call letters and location, then the frequency that had been previously used by the principal station, and any additional stations assigned to that frequency. Bolded stations' call signs are the original primary assignments, while call signs shown in parentheses were owned by the same licensee as the principal station. The additional stations on a frequency were: 1) shared allocations, 2) daytimers, or 3) secondary stations which eventually achieved full-time status, but at lower power or using a directional antenna that protected the primary station's coverage.

Freq. (kHz)	Used for	Max. Power (watts)	Zone	Principal station(s)		Other stations sharing frequency (zone)
Freq. (kHz)	Used for	Max. Power (watts)	Zone	Calls, City	Prev. freq.	Other stations sharing frequency (zone)
550	Regional	1,000	—	—	—	7 U.S. stations
560	Regional	1,000	—	—	—	10 U.S. stations
570	Regional	1,000	—	—	—	11 U.S. stations
580	Regional	1,000	—	—	—	6 U.S. stations 8 Canadian stations
590	Regional	1,000	—	—	—	5 U.S. stations
600	Regional	1,000	—	—	—	7 U.S. stations 3 Canadian stations
610	Regional	1,000	—	—	—	5 U.S. stations
620	Regional	1,000	—	—	—	6 U.S. stations
630	Regional	1,000	—	—	—	4 U.S stations 3 Canadian stations
640	Clear	TBD	5	**KFI**, Los Angeles, California	640	WOI, Ames, Iowa (4); WAIU, Columbus, Ohio (2)
650	Clear	TBD	3	**WSM**, Nashville, Tennessee	890	KPCB, Seattle, Washington (5)
660	Clear	TBD	1	**WEAF**, New York, New York	610	WAAW, Omaha, Nebraska (4)
670	Clear	TBD	4	**WMAQ**, Chicago, Illinois	670	none
680	Clear	TBD	5	**KPO**, San Francisco, California	710	KFEQ, Saint Joseph, Missouri (4); WPTF, Raleigh, North Carolina (3)
690	Clear		Canada			CJCJ, Calgary, Alberta; NAA, Arlington, Virginia (2)
700	Clear	TBD	2	**WLW**, Cincinnati, Ohio	700	none
710	Clear	TBD	1	**WOR**, New York, New York (Newark, New Jersey)	710	KMPC, Los Angeles, California (5)
720	Clear	TBD	4	**WGN/(WLIB)**, Chicago, Illinois	720	none
730	Clear		Canada	CKAC, Montreal, Quebec		CKWX, Vancouver, British Columbia
740	Clear	TBD	3	**WSB**, Atlanta, Georgia	630	KMMJ, Clay Center, Nebraska (4)
750	Clear	TBD	2	**WJR**, Detroit, Michigan	680	none
760	Clear	TBD	1	**WJZ**, New York, New York (Newark, New Jersey)	660	WEW, Saint Louis, Missouri (4); KVI, Tacoma, Washington (5)
770	Clear	TBD	4	**WBBM/(WJBT)**, Chicago, Illinois	770	none
770	Clear	TBD	4	KFAB, Lincoln, Nebraska	940	none
780	Regional	1,000	—	—	—	6 U.S. stations 3 Canadian stations
790	Clear	TBD	5	**KGO**, San Francisco, California (Oakland)	790	WGY, Schenectady, New York (1)
800	Clear	TBD	3	WFAA, Dallas, Texas	550	none
800	Clear	TBD	3	**WBAP**, Fort Worth, Texas	600	none
810	Clear	TBD	4	**WCCO**, Minneapolis, Minnesota	740	WPCH, New York, New York (1)
820	Clear	TBD	2	**WHAS**, Louisville, Kentucky	930	none
830	Clear	TBD	5	**KOA**, Denver, Colorado	920	WRUF, Gainesville, Florida (3); WHDH, Boston, Massachusetts (1)
840	Clear		Canada	CFCA/CNRT, Toronto, Ontario		
850	Clear	TBD	3	**WWL**, New Orleans, Louisiana	1220	none
850	Clear	TBD	3	KWKH, Shreveport, Louisiana	760	none
860	Clear	TBD	1	**WABC/(WBOQ)**, New York, New York	970	WHB, Kansas City, Missouri (4); KMO, Tacoma, Washington (5)
870	Clear	TBD	4	**WLS**, Chicago, Illinois	870	none
870	Clear	TBD	4	WENR/(WBCN), Chicago, Illinois	1040	none
880	Regional	1,000	—	—	—	7 U.S. stations 7 Canadian stations
890	Regional	1,000	—	—	—	9 U.S. stations
900	Regional	1,000	—	—	—	7 U.S. stations
910	Clear		Canada	CFCF/CHYC, Montreal, Quebec		CKY, Winnipeg, Manitoba; CJAT, Trail, British Columbia
920	Regional	1,000	—	—	—	6 U.S. stations
930	Regional	1,000	—	—	—	8 U.S. stations 5 Canadian stations
940	Regional	1,000	—	—	—	6 U.S. stations
950	Regional	1,000	—	—	—	4 U.S. stations
960	Clear		Canada	CFRB/CKGW, Toronto, Ontario		CFRN, Edmonton, Alberta
970	Clear	TBD	5	**KJR**, Seattle, Washington	970	WCFL, Chicago, Illinois (4)
980	Clear	TBD	2	**KDKA**, Pittsburgh, Pennsylvania	960	none
990	Clear	TBD	1	**WBZ**, Springfield, Massachusetts / WBZA, Boston	910	none
1000	Clear	TBD	4	**WHO**, Des Moines	560	KFVD, Los Angeles, California (5)
1000	Clear	TBD	4	WOC, Davenport, Iowa	800	KFVD, Los Angeles, California (5)
1010	Regional	1,000	—	—	—	7 U.S. stations 2 Canadian stations
1020	Clear	TBD	2	**KYW/(KFKX)**, Chicago, Illinois (4)	570	WRAX, Philadelphia, Pennsylvania (2)
1030	Clear		Canada	CFCF, Montreal, Quebec		CNRV, Vancouver, British Columbia
1040	Clear	TBD	3	**KRLD**, Dallas, Texas	650	KTHS, Hot Springs, Arkansas (3); WKAR, East Lansing, Michigan (2)
1040	Clear	TBD	3	**KRLD**, Dallas, Texas	1470	WKEN, Kenmore, New York (1)
1050	Clear	TBD	5	**KNX**, Los Angeles, California	890	KFKB, Milford, Kansas (4)
1060	Clear	TBD	1	**WTIC**, Hartford, Connecticut	560	WJAG, Norfolk, Nebraska (3); KWJJ, Portland, Oregon (5)
1060	Clear	TBD	1	**WBAL**, Baltimore, Maryland	1050	WJAG, Norfolk, Nebraska (3); KWJJ, Portland, Oregon (5)
1070	Clear	TBD	2	**WTAM/(WEAR)**, Cleveland, Ohio	750	KJBS, San Francisco, California (5); WCAZ, Carthage, Illinois/ WDZ, Tuscola, Illinois (4)
1080	Clear	TBD	3	**WBT**, Charlotte, North Carolina	1160	WMBI / WCBD, Chicago, Illinois (4)
1090	Clear	TBD	4	**KMOX**, Saint Louis, Missouri	1000	none
1100	Clear	TBD	1	WLWL, New York, New York	810	KGDM, Stockton, California (5)
1100	Clear	TBD	1	**WPG**, Atlantic City, New Jersey	1100	KGDM, Stockton, California (5)
1110	Clear	TBD	2	**WRVA**, Richmond, Virginia	1180	KSOO, Sioux Falls, South Dakota (4)
1120	Regional	1,000	—	—	—	10 U.S. stations 4 Canadian stations
1130	Clear	TBD	5	**KSL**, Salt Lake City, Utah	990	WJJD, Chicago, Illinois (4); WOV, New York, New York (1); WMAK, Buffalo, New York
1140	Clear	TBD	3	WAPI, Birmingham, Alabama	880	none
1140	Clear	TBD	3	**KVOO**, Tulsa, Oklahoma	860	none
1150	Clear	TBD	1	**WHAM**, Rochester, New York	1070	none
1160	Clear	TBD	4	**WOWO**, Fort Wayne, Indiana	1310	none
1160	Clear	TBD	4	**WWVA**, Wheeling, West Virginia (2)	580	none
1170	Clear	TBD	2	**WCAU**, Philadelphia, Pennsylvania	1150	KTNT, Muscatine, Iowa (4)
1180	Clear	TBD	5	**KEX**, Portland, Oregon	1080	WDGY/WHDI, Minneapolis, Minnesota (4)
1180	Clear	TBD	5	KOB, Albuquerque, New Mexico	760	WDGY/WHDI, Minneapolis, Minnesota (4)
1190	Clear	TBD	3	**WOAI**, San Antonio, Texas	1070	WICC, Bridgeport, Connecticut (1)
1200	Local	100	—	—	—	48 U.S. stations
1210	Local	100	—	—	—	44 U.S. stations 5 Canadian stations
1220	Regional	1,000	—	—	—	6 U.S. stations
1230	Regional	1,000	—	—	—	8 U.S. stations
1240	Regional	1.000	—	—	—	3 U.S. stations
1250	Regional	1,000	—	—	—	12 U.S. stations
1260	Regional	1,000	—	—	—	6 U.S. stations
1270	Regional	1,000	—	—	—	10 U.S. stations
1280	Regional	1,000	—	—	—	6 U.S. stations
1290	Regional	1,000	—	—	—	7 U.S. stations
1300	Regional	1,000	—	—	—	12 U.S. stations
1310	Local	100	—	—	—	53 U.S. stations
1320	Regional	1,000	—	—	—	6 U.S. stations
1330	Regional	1,000	—	—	—	5 U.S. stations
1340	Regional	1,000	—	—	—	4 U.S. stations
1350	Regional	1,000	—	—	—	5 U.S. stations
1360	Regional	1,000	—	—	—	8 U.S. stations
1370	Local	100	—	—	—	42 U.S. stations
1380	Regional	1,000	—	—	—	4 U.S. stations
1390	Regional	1,000	—	—	—	4 U.S. stations
1400	Regional	1,000	—	—	—	9 U.S. stations
1410	Regional	1,000	—	—	—	11 U.S. stations
1420	Local	100	—	—	—	38 U.S. stations
1430	Regional	1,000	—	—	—	7 U.S. stations
1440	Regional	1,000	—	—	—	9 U.S. stations
1450	Regional	1,000	—	—	—	9 U.S. stations
1460	Super; Regional	5,000	2	WJSV, Washington, D.C.	1480	none
1460	Super; Regional	5,000	4	KSTP, Saint Paul, Minnesota	1360	none
1470	Super; Regional	5,000	3	WLAC/WTNT, Nashville, Tennessee	1330	none
1470	Super; Regional	5,000	5	KGA, Spokane, Washington	1150	none
1480	Super; Regional	5,000	1	WKBW, Buffalo, New York	1380	none
1480	Super; Regional	5,000	3	KFJF, Oklahoma City, Oklahoma	1100	none
1490	Super; Regional	5,000	1	WFBL, Syracuse, New York	1160	none
1490	Super; Regional	5,000	2	WCKY, Cincinnati, Ohio (Covington, Kentucky)	none	none
1490	Super; Regional	5,000	4	WHT/WORD/WJAZ, Chicago, Illinois	var.	none
1500	Local	100	—	—	—	31 U.S. stations

== See also ==
- North American Regional Broadcasting Agreement
- Federal Radio Commission
