= List of AM-band radio station lists issued by the United States government =

List of AM-band radio station lists issued by the United States government is a review of the official AM-band station lists prepared by U.S. regulators.

== Table information ==
In the United States, radio station regulation has been the responsibility of the following agencies:

- Department of Commerce (DOC) (1912–1927)
- Federal Radio Commission (FRC) (1927–1934)
- Federal Communications Commission (FCC) (1934+)

In the list below, under the Listed by heading, "Zone" refers to the five regional zones established by the provisions of the Davis Amendment, which was in force from 1928 to 1936. Under the Source heading, "RSB" refers to the Radio Service Bulletin, published until June 1932 by the Department of Commerce, from July 1932 until July 1934 by the Federal Radio Commission, and thereafter by the Federal Communications Commission. The annual issues of Commercial and Government Radio Stations of the United States were all published by the Department of Commerce.

| Date | Listed by | Source | Notes |
|---|---|---|---|
| 3/10/1922 | Owner | RSB #59 (3/1/1922), pages 13–14 | 67 stations. First cumulative list issued after the adoption of the 12/1/1921 regulations that formally established a "broadcast service" category |
| 3/31/1922 | Owner | RSB #60 (4/1/1922), pages 24–26 | 137 stations. Also 4/1/1922-4/15/1922 supplement |
| 4/30/1922 | Call letters | RSB #61 (5/1/1922), pages 19–22 | 223 stations. Also 5/1/1922-5/12/1922 supplement |
| 5/31/1922 | Call letters | RSB #62 (6/1/1922), pages 19–24 | 312 stations. Also 6/1/1922-6/15/1922 supplement |
| 6/30/1922 | City | Commercial and Government Radio Stations of the U.S. (6/30/1922), pages 70–72 | 378 stations. |
| 6/30/1922 | Call letters | Commercial and Government Radio Stations of the U.S. (6/30/1922), pages 73–78 | 378 stations. |
| 3/1/1923 | Call letters | RSB #72 (4/2/1923), pages 14–22 | 555 stations. Services: E)ntertaiment (360 or 400 meters); M)arket & W)eather (485 meters) |
| 6/30/1923 | City | Commercial and Government Radio Stations of the U.S. (6/30/1923), pages 68–71 | 558 stations |
| 6/30/1923 | Call letters | Commercial and Government Radio Stations of the U.S. (6/30/1923), pages 72–81 | 558 stations |
| 1/31/1924 | Call letters | RSB #82 (2/1/1924), pages 12–20 | 536 stations. |
| 2/29/1924 | Call letters | RSB #83 (3/1/1924), pages 12–21 | 554 stations. |
| 6/30/1924 | City | Commercial and Government Radio Stations of the U.S. (6/30/1924), pages 68–71 | 545 stations. |
| 6/30/1924 | Call letters | Commercial and Government Radio Stations of the U.S. (6/30/1924), pages 72–80 | 545 stations. |
| 1/31/1925 | Call letters | RSB #94 (2/2/1925), pages 11–21 | 557 stations. |
| 2/28/1925 | Frequency | RSB #95 (3/2/1925), pages 9–13 | 569 stations. |
| 5/31/1925 | State/city | RSB #98 (6/1/1925), pages 13–16 | 577 stations. |
| 6/30/1925 | State/city | Commercial and Government Radio Stations of the U.S. (6/30/1925), pages 55–57 | 585 stations. |
| 6/30/1925 | Call letters | Commercial and Government Radio Stations of the U.S. (6/30/1925), pages 58–68 | 585 stations. |
| 1/30/1926 | State/city | RSB #106 (1/30/1926), pages 8–10 | 541 stations |
| 1/30/1926 | Call letters | RSB #106 (1/30/1926), pages 11–20 | 541 stations |
| 6/30/1926 | State/city | Commercial and Government Radio Stations of the U.S. (6/30/1926), pages 61–63 | 535 stations. |
| 6/30/1926 | Call letters | Commercial and Government Radio Stations of the U.S. (6/30/1926), pages 64–73 | 535 stations. |
| 12/31/1926 | Call letters | RSB #117 (12/31/1926), pages 9–21 | 678 stations. A breakdown in regulation means listed frequencies and powers might be incorrect |
| 5/3/1927 | Call letters | RSB #121 (4/30/1927), pages 6–14 | 670 stations. Temporary permits issued after the formation of the Federal Radio Commission |
| 6/15/1927 | State/city | RSB #122 (5/31/1927), pages 5–10 | |
| 6/15/1927 | Frequency | RSB #122 (5/31/1927), pages 10–15 | |
| 6/30/1927 | State/city | Commercial and Government Radio Stations of the U.S. (6/30/1927), pages 66–71 | |
| 6/30/1927 | Call letters | Commercial and Government Radio Stations of the U.S. (6/30/1927), pages 72–86 | |
| 6/30/1927 | Frequency | Commercial and Government Radio Stations of the U.S. (6/30/1927), pages 87–92 | |
| 7/1/1927 | Call letters | Annual Report of the FRC (6/30/1927), pages 55–64 | |
| 11/1/1927 | Frequency | Jurisdiction of Radio Commission (2/1928), pages 14–17 | Frequencies from 600 to 1000 kHz |
| 12/1/1927 | Frequency | Jurisdiction of Radio Commission (2/1928), pages 10–12 | Frequencies from 600 to 1000 kHz that are cleared of interference |
| 12/1/1927 | Frequency | Jurisdiction of Radio Commission (2/1928), pages 13–14 | Frequencies from 600 to 1000 kHz that are uncleared of interference |
| 1/31/1928 | Call letters | RSB #130 (1/31/1928), pages 15–29 | |
| 2/29/1928 | State/city | RSB #131 (2/29/1928), pages 12–18 | |
| 6/30/1928 | State/city | Commercial and Government Radio Stations of the U.S. (6/30/1928), pages 76–81 | |
| 6/30/1928 | Call letters | Commercial and Government Radio Stations of the U.S. (6/30/1928), pages 82–96 | |
| 6/30/1928 | Frequency | Commercial and Government Radio Stations of the U.S. (6/30/1928), pages 97–102 | |
| 9/1/1928 | State/city | Second Annual Report of the FRC (6/30/1928), pages 171-191 | Includes provisional assignments for 11/11/1928 |
| 11/11/1928 | State/city | Commercial and Government Radio Stations of the U.S. (6/30/1928), pages 162-166 | Major reallocation made under the provisions of the FRC's General Order 40 |
| 11/11/1928 | Call letters | Commercial and Government Radio Stations of the U.S. (6/30/1928), pages 167-171 | Major reallocation made under the provisions of the FRC's General Order 40 |
| 11/11/1928 | Frequency | Commercial and Government Radio Stations of the U.S. (6/30/1928), pages 172-176 | Major reallocation made under the provisions of the FRC's General Order 40 |
| 11/11/1928 | Frequency | Second Annual Report of the FRC (6/30/1928), pages 200-214 | Includes owner, power and timesharing information |
| 1/10/1929 | Call letters | H. R. 15430 Hearings, pages 12–31 | |
| 2/28/1929 | State/city | RSB #143 (2/28/1929), pages 14–24 | |
| 6/30/1929 | State/city | Commercial and Government Radio Stations of the U.S. (6/30/1929), pages 104-109 | |
| 6/30/1929 | Call letters | Commercial and Government Radio Stations of the U.S. (6/30/1929), pages 110-121 | |
| 6/30/1929 | Frequency | Commercial and Government Radio Stations of the U.S. (6/30/1929), pages 122-127 | |
| 11/9/1929 | Call letters | Third Annual Report of the FRC (11/1/1929), pages 101-120 | |
| 6/30/1930 | State/city | Commercial and Government Radio Stations of the U.S. (6/30/1930), pages 164-169 | |
| 6/30/1930 | Call letters | Commercial and Government Radio Stations of the U.S. (6/30/1930), pages 170-183 | |
| 6/30/1930 | Frequency | Commercial and Government Radio Stations of the U.S. (6/30/1930), pages 184-189 | |
| 2/2/1931 | Call letters | Broadcasting Stations of the U.S. (FRC), pages 1–29 | |
| 2/2/1931 | State/city | Broadcasting Stations of the U.S. (FRC), pages 30–61 | |
| 2/2/1931 | Frequency | Broadcasting Stations of the U.S. (FRC), pages 62–100 | |
| 6/30/1931 | State/city | Commercial and Government Radio Stations of the U.S. (6/30/1931), pages 186-191 | |
| 6/30/1931 | Call letters | Commercial and Government Radio Stations of the U.S. (6/30/1931), pages 192-207 | |
| 6/30/1931 | Frequency | Commercial and Government Radio Stations of the U.S. (6/30/1931), pages 208-213 | |
| 1/1/1932 | Call letters | Radio Broadcast Stations in the U.S. (FRC), pages 1–29 | Includes Davis Amendment assigned "quota units" |
| 1/1/1932 | Frequency | Radio Broadcast Stations in the U.S. (FRC), pages 31–47 | |
| 1/1/1932 | Zone/state | Radio Broadcast Stations in the U.S. (FRC), pages 49–71 | Includes Davis Amendment assigned "quota units" |
| 12/1/1933 | Call letters | Preliminary Report on Communications Companies: Appendix J | Includes Davis Amendment assigned "quota units" |
| 12/1/1933 | Zone/state | Preliminary Report on Communications Companies: Appendix J | Includes Davis Amendment assigned "quota units" |
| 1/1/1934 | Call letters | Radio Broadcast Stations in the U.S. (FRC), pages 1–29 | Includes Davis Amendment assigned "quota units" |
| 1/1/1934 | Frequency | Radio Broadcast Stations in the U.S. (FRC), pages 31–47 | |
| 1/1/1934 | Zone/state | Radio Broadcast Stations in the U.S. (FRC), pages 49–70 | Includes Davis Amendment assigned "quota units" |
| 1/1/1935 | Call letters | Radio Broadcast Stations (FCC) | Includes daytime and nighttime Davis Amendment assigned "quota units" |
| 1/1/1935 | Frequency | Radio Broadcast Stations (FCC) | |
| 1/1/1935 | Zone/state | Radio Broadcast Stations (FCC) | |
| 1/1/1936 | Call letters | Radio Broadcast Stations (FCC) | |
| 1/1/1936 | Frequency | Radio Broadcast Stations (FCC) | |
| 1/1/1936 | Zone/state | Radio Broadcast Stations (FCC) | Includes daytime and nighttime Davis Amendment assigned "quota units" |
| 1/1/1937 | Call letters | Radio Broadcast Stations (FCC) | |
| 1/1/1937 | Frequency | Radio Broadcast Stations (FCC) | |
| 1/1/1937 | State/city | Radio Broadcast Stations (FCC) | |
| 1/1/1938 | Call letters | Radio Broadcast Stations (FCC) | Linked site is missing the last two pages |
| 1/1/1938 | Frequency | Radio Broadcast Stations (FCC) | |
| 1/1/1938 | State/city | Radio Broadcast Stations (FCC) | |
| 1/1/1939 | Call letters | Radio Broadcast Stations (FCC) | |
| 1/1/1939 | Frequency | Radio Broadcast Stations (FCC) | |
| 1/1/1939 | State/city | Radio Broadcast Stations (FCC) | |
| 1/1/1940 | Call letters | Radio Broadcast Stations (FCC) | Linked site is missing pages 96–97 |
| 1/1/1940 | Frequency | Radio Broadcast Stations (FCC) | |
| 1/1/1940 | State/city | Radio Broadcast Stations (FCC) | |
| 9/10/1940 | Call letters | Radio Broadcast Stations (FCC) | |
| 9/10/1940 | Frequency | Radio Broadcast Stations (FCC) | |
| 9/10/1940 | State/city | Radio Broadcast Stations (FCC) | |
| 1/1/1941 | Call letters | Radio Broadcast Stations (FCC) | |
| 1/1/1941 | Frequency | Radio Broadcast Stations (FCC) | |
| 1/1/1941 | State/city | Radio Broadcast Stations (FCC) | |
| 3/29/1941 | Call letters | Radio Broadcast Stations (FCC) | Major reassignment resulting from the implementation of the North American Regional Broadcasting Agreement (NARBA) |
| 3/29/1941 | Frequency | Radio Broadcast Stations (FCC) | Major reassignment resulting from the implementation of the North American Regional Broadcasting Agreement (NARBA) |
| 3/29/1941 | State/city | Radio Broadcast Stations (FCC) | Major reassignment resulting from the implementation of the North American Regional Broadcasting Agreement (NARBA) |
| 3/29/1941 | Frequency | "United States Assignments" | Arrangement between the United States of America, Canada, Cuba, the Dominican Republic, Haiti, and Mexico, comprising recommendations of the North American Regional Radio-Engineering Meeting (supplemental to North American Regional Broadcasting Agreement [NARBA], Habana, 1937) |
| 1/1/1946 | Frequency | Radio Broadcast Stations (FCC) | |
| 11/15/1950 | Frequency | "Annex 3: Initial Broadcast Station List", pages 670-723. | 1950 North American Regional Broadcasting Agreement [NARBA] |
| 12/31/1975 | Frequency | Official list of notified assignments of standard broadcast stations of the U.S. (FCC) | |
