= WCHI =

WCHI may refer to:

- WCHI (AM), a radio station at 1350 AM licensed to serve Chillicothe, Ohio, United States
- WCHI-FM, a radio station at 95.5 FM licensed to serve Chicago, Illinois, United States
- WCHI (1490 AM), a radio station at 1490 AM licensed to serve Chicago, Illinois, United States, which operated from 1925 to 1932
