= WBBZ =

WBBZ can refer to:

- WBBZ (AM), a radio station located in Ponca City, Oklahoma
- WBBZ-TV (formerly WNGS), a television station located in Springville, New York
