= WCHI (1490 AM) =

Radio station in Chicago (1925–1932)

Chicago, Illinois; United States
- Frequency: 1490 kHz

Ownership
- Owner: Peoples Pulpit Association

History
- First air date: January 1, 1925
- Last air date: May 7, 1932
- Former call signs: WORD (1925–1930)
- Call sign meaning: "Chicago"

Technical information
- Power: 5,000 watts

WCHI was a radio station in Chicago, Illinois, United States, that operated from January 1, 1925, until it was deleted in 1932. The station—owned by the Peoples Pulpit Association, a corporation of the Jehovah's Witnesses—was established as WORD in Batavia before moving to Chicago in 1930 and changing its call letters. At the time of its deletion, it was transmitting with 5,000 watts on 1490 kHz. Its license was revoked by the Federal Radio Commission (FRC) over its attacks on the medical profession and in order to allow another station full-time use of the 1490 kHz frequency.

== History ==
=== Jehovah's Witnesses ===
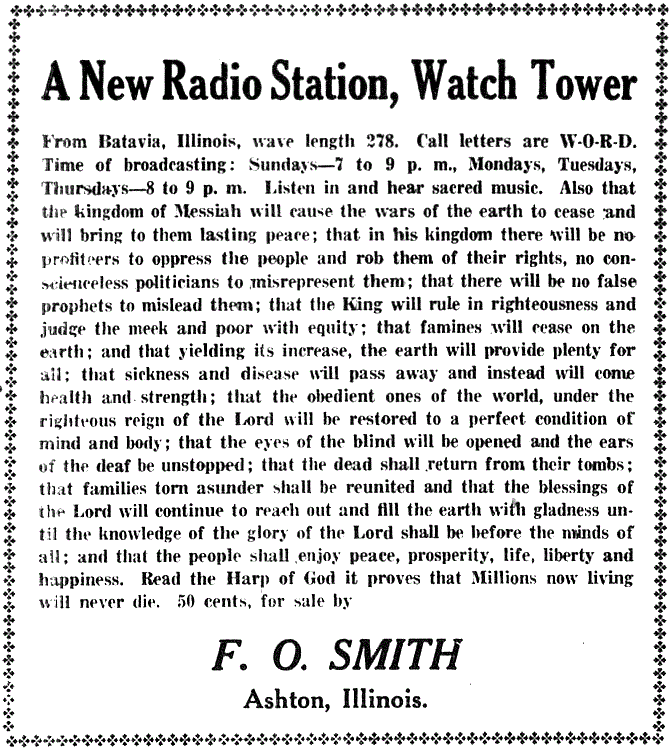
Radio station WORD was established in 1925 to help promote the religious teachings of the Jehovah's Witnesses.

WCHI's initial license, with the call sign WORD, was issued to the Peoples Pulpit Association in Batavia, for a wavelength of 278 meters (1080 kHz) and a power of 500 watts. The station made its debut broadcast on January 1, 1925. The station aired evening programs including music and Bible lectures, with studios in Chicago's Webster Hotel. WORD was not entirely religious: some programming originated from a one-room studio at the home of Max Melhorn, on whose Batavia farm the station's two towers supporting its "flat top" transmitting antenna were located, and where a loudspeaker was installed to allow those without radios to hear programs.

A few months after its start, WORD was reassigned to 1090 kHz, and its transmitter power increased to 2,000 watts. In August 1925 the station was authorized to upgrade to 5,000 watts, making it just the seventh 5,000-watt station. Residents of Batavia did not come to appreciate WORD or its religious programming, noting that the station, when active, impeded reception of other outlets. By early 1928, the station was broadcasting on 252 meters (1190 kHz).

As part of the November 11, 1928, implementation of the FRC's General Order 40, WORD was assigned to 1480 kHz, sharing the frequency with nearby stations WHT and WJAZ. In early 1929, a newly licensed station, WCKY in Covington, Kentucky, was added as a fourth shared-time assignment. This grant specified that WCKY would receive four-sevenths of the available broadcasting hours, with WCHI and the other two stations allocated one-seventh time each; moreover, WCKY "was to have first choice of the broadcasting time".

=== Into Chicago and off the air ===
Several major changes took place in 1930, starting March 2, when the entire 1480 ensemble moved to 1490 kHz and WLAC of Nashville, Tennessee, was relocated to 1470; WCKY and WLAC had been causing mutual interference over much of Kentucky and Tennessee.

Later that year, WORD relocated from Batavia to Chicago and changed its call letters to WCHI. Those call letters had previously been assigned in April 1930 to one of its time-sharing partners: the former WSOA—successor to WHT—owned by the Radiophone Broadcasting Company, which was deleted at the end of October. The towers at Batavia did not come down until the early 1950s and 1969, respectively.

Though Peoples Pulpit continued to own WCHI, its religious nature diminished in importance over the years, and ultimately, it was other programming on its air that would lead to its demise. In September 1931, the FRC designated the station's license renewal for hearing after receiving complaints of broadcasts by Percy L. Clark and Perley W. Johnson. The commission's general counsel charged WCHI for attacking the medical profession, in particular "surgical operations and the use of vaccines". While both Clark and Johnson claimed to be doctors, the latter lacked the license to practice medicine. Another high-profile personality who regularly spoke over WCHI was Winfield Caslow, the "Main Street Crusader".

Unsatisfied with its somewhat limited schedule, WCKY petitioned the FRC to give it unlimited hours on 1490 kHz. An FRC examiner recommended that this request be denied; however, on October 30, 1931, the radio commission reversed the recommendation and ordered the deletion of WCHI, as well as time-share partner WJAZ, with full use of the frequency awarded to WCKY. The primary reason to remove WCHI was the station's broadcasts against the public health, but other considerations also prevailed. The Davis Amendment, a 1928 modification of the Radio Act of 1927, had established the obligation to effect the equity of the distribution of stations. Two years later, a system of "quota units" was instituted. One of the reasons given for the deletion of WCHI and WJAZ was to take quota units away from Illinois, 55 percent over its limit; by comparison, Kentucky was just 2 percent over.

The Peoples Pulpit Association stayed on the air after the November 20 deadline to cease broadcasting, as it appealed the FRC action to the United States Court of Appeals for the District of Columbia Circuit, but Pulpit opted to have the case dismissed on April 30, 1932, and the license was formally deleted May 7.
