= KQSN =

- Ponca City, Oklahoma; United States
- Broadcast area: Ponca City, Oklahoma; Arkansas City, Kansas
- Frequency: 104.7 MHz
- Branding: 104.7 The Bull

Programming
- Format: Country

Ownership
- Owner: Sterling Broadcasting LLC
- Sister stations: WBBZ

History
- First air date: June 1984 (as KIXR)
- Former call signs: KIXR (1984–2013)

Technical information
- Licensing authority: FCC
- Facility ID: 47064
- Class: C3
- ERP: 25,000 watts
- HAAT: 89 meters (292 ft)
- Transmitter coordinates: 36.789194°N 97.048361°W

Links
- Public license information: Public file; LMS
- Webcast: Listen live
- Website: www.poncacitynow.com

KQSN (104.7 FM; "The Bull") is a radio station licensed to Ponca City, Oklahoma. The station broadcasts a country music format and is owned by Sterling Broadcasting LLC.

On September 12, 2018, KQSN changed its format from adult contemporary to country, branded as "104.7 The Bull".
