= WENR (Chicago) =

Radio station in Chicago, Illinois (1925–1954)

WENR was a commercial AM radio station, located in Chicago, Illinois, which was licensed from 1925 until its deletion in 1954. Its broadcasting hours were then transferred to WLS, which had been its timeshare partner.

== History ==
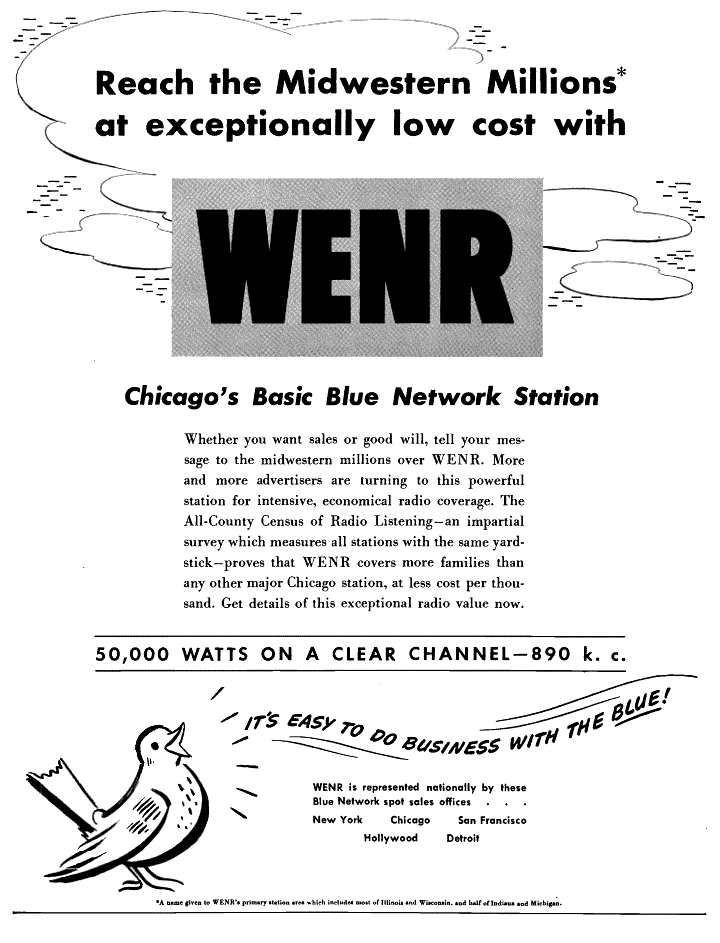
1942 station advertisement.

WENR originated as a 10-watt station started in late 1924 by E. N. Rauland, whose company manufactured the All-American brand of radios. On March 19, 1925, the company received a license for a new station with the call sign WENR, broadcasting with 10 watts at 1130 kHz. In fall 1925, WENR began using a 1,000-watt transmitter designed by Rauland. The station shared time on the frequency with WBCN, owned at that time by the Southtown Economist newspaper. By 1927, the two stations had changed frequencies to 1040 kHz.

In 1927, Chicago investor Samuel Insull purchased both stations through his company Great Lakes Broadcasting. On September 1, 1928, broadcasts as WBCN were discontinued, and the station, now licensed as WENR-WBCN, began full-time operations on the frequency. In November 1928, under the provisions of the Federal Radio Commission's (FRC) General Order 40, WENR moved to a "clear channel" frequency of 870 kHz, sharing time with WLS, becoming the first Chicago radio station operating with 50,000 watts, from a new transmitter site in Downers Grove, Illinois. Insull moved his stations into Chicago's Strauss Building, and then to his own Civic Opera Building.

In 1931, WENR was sold to the National Broadcasting Company (NBC) for approximately $1 million. The station became part of NBC's Blue Network. NBC moved WENR's studios to the Merchandise Mart, its Chicago headquarters. On May 15, 1933, after the FRC requested that stations using only one of their assigned call letters drop those that were no longer in regular use, the WBCN call sign was eliminated, and the station reverted to just WENR.

Changes were made regarding AM frequencies in 1941 as a result of the North American Regional Broadcasting Agreement (NARBA); this moved WENR and WLS from 870 to 890 kHz. In August 1943, NBC was ordered to divest itself of the Blue Network and its stations; WENR and Blue were sold to Edward J. Noble. In 1945 the Blue Network would be renamed as the American Broadcasting Company (ABC). The station continued on at the Mart, as NBC's tenant, until 1952 when it moved back to the Civic Opera House. Paul Harvey worked as an evening newscaster on WENR from 1944 to 1951.

WENR and WLS shared their common frequency on a time-sharing arrangement until 1954, when ABC (then known as American Broadcasting-Paramount Theatres) bought a 50 percent interest in WLS and combined the stations under the WLS call sign.
