= KQYX =

- Galena, Kansas; United States
- Broadcast area: Joplin, Missouri
- Frequency: 1450 kHz
- Branding: Vibe 92.9

Programming
- Format: Contemporary Hit Radio

Ownership
- Owner: American Media Investments, Inc.

History
- First air date: 1927 (as WMBH)
- Former call signs: WMBH (1927–2001)

Technical information
- Licensing authority: FCC
- Facility ID: 5268
- Class: C
- Power: 940 watts
- Transmitter coordinates: 37°4′10″N 94°32′49″W
- Translators: 92.9 K225CS (Joplin, MO)

Links
- Public license information: Public file; LMS
- Webcast: Listen live
- Website: vibe929.com

KQYX (1450 AM, "Vibe 92.9") is a contemporary hit radio formatted AM radio station licensed to Galena, Kansas and serving the Joplin, Missouri area. It is currently owned by American Media Investment. Dating back to its initial broadcasts in 1927 under its original call sign of WMBH, KQYX is the longest continually operating station in the Joplin area.

== FM Translator ==
An FM translator simulcasts the AM station; this affords listeners the ability to listen on FM with its improved high fidelity sound. The translator may also improve the station's coverage.

Broadcast translator for KQYX
Call sign	Frequency	City of license	FID	ERP (W)	Class	FCC info
K225CS	92.9 FM	Joplin, Missouri	200592	250	D	LMS

== History ==
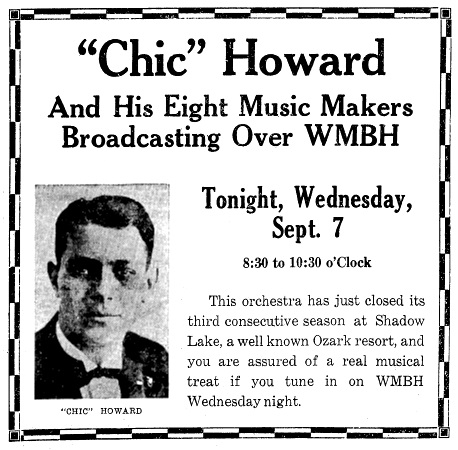
The station (then known as WMBH) moved to Joplin in 1927

KQYX was first licensed on January 10, 1927 as a portable broadcasting station, with the sequentially assigned call letters WMBH, to Edwin Dudley Aber of Chicago, Illinois. Portable stations could be transported from place-to-place on movable platforms such as trucks. They were generally hired out for a few weeks at a time to theaters, mostly located in small midwestern towns that didn't have their own radio stations, to be used for special programs broadcast to the local community. However, if WMBH ever actually toured as a portable its career was brief, because by early June it was reported to be in Joplin, and a government notification reported that it was "no longer portable". After settling in the station adopted the slogan "Where Memories Bring Happiness" based on its call sign.

WMBH's initial studio was located in the Keystone Hotel, with the transmitter at 1334 Roosevelt. In August 1932 Aber transferred ownership of the station to W. M. Robertson. In January 1942, the station spent $5,000 to double its space to 2,000 square feet, moving into new quarters in the lobby of the Frisco Building.

In 1946, WMBH-FM (now KIXQ) went on the air, broadcasting a variety of informative and entertaining programs including the long-running "Quality Hour of Music."

On July 25, 2001, the station engaged in a two-way call letter and format swap, with AM 1450 WMBH receiving the KQYX call letters and a talk radio format, and AM 1560 KQYX becoming WMBH. In early 2009, the community of license was changed from Joplin to nearby Galena, Kansas.

In 2010, KQYX switched to sports as "1450 the Score", using FOX Sports Radio as a source, and became an affiliate of the Oklahoma City Thunder professional basketball team. On February 3, 2014, it adopted a southern gospel format, branded as "1450 The Dove".

On December 27, 2022, KQYX changed its format from southern gospel to soft adult contemporary, branded as "Magic Mix 92.9", positioning as "Joplin’s Relaxing Lite Favorites". The first song was "A Million Dreams" by Pink.

In May 2026, KQYX dropped the soft adult contemporary format and flipped to contemporary hit radio, rebranding as "Vibe 92.9".

== Previous logos ==
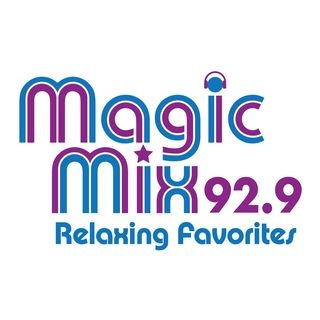
