= WJAZ (Chicago) =

Radio stations in Chicago (1922–1931)

WJAZ was the call sign used from 1922 to 1931 by a series of four separate, but closely related, broadcasting stations located in Chicago, Illinois, United States, and operated by the Chicago Radio Laboratory/Zenith Radio Corporations.

The original WJAZ was first licensed in the summer of 1922, and the next year began broadcasting from the Edgewater Beach Hotel in Chicago. However, it was soon determined that a suburban transmitter location would be preferable, and Zenith began preparations to re-establish WJAZ's operations at a more suitable site. Following operation for a few weeks by the Chicago Tribune as WGN, the station license for the original WJAZ was sold to the hotel management, and the call letters changed to WEBH.

In order to maintain control of the well-known WJAZ call sign until the new facility was ready, in 1924 Zenith briefly renamed a second Chicago station, WSAX, to WJAZ. Later that year, Zenith prepared a portable broadcasting station, mounted on a truck body, in order to evaluate potential new transmitter locations, and this mobile unit inherited the WJAZ call letters. Roving test broadcasts were made from various sites surrounding Chicago, and Mount Prospect, Illinois was ultimately selected for the new transmitter location. In 1925, the replacement facility was completed, and the WJAZ call sign was transferred from the portable unit to the new station.

The next year WJAZ gained national notoriety, when Zenith made an unauthorized change in its transmitting frequency, directly challenging the Department of Commerce's authority under the Radio Act of 1912 to assign frequencies. The courts sided with WJAZ; as a result the Radio Act of 1927 was enacted, which strengthened the government's regulatory powers and established the Federal Radio Commission.

WJAZ was deleted in 1931, after a co-channel station in Kentucky successfully petitioned for full-time use of the shared frequency.

== History ==
=== Initial authorization (1922–1924) ===
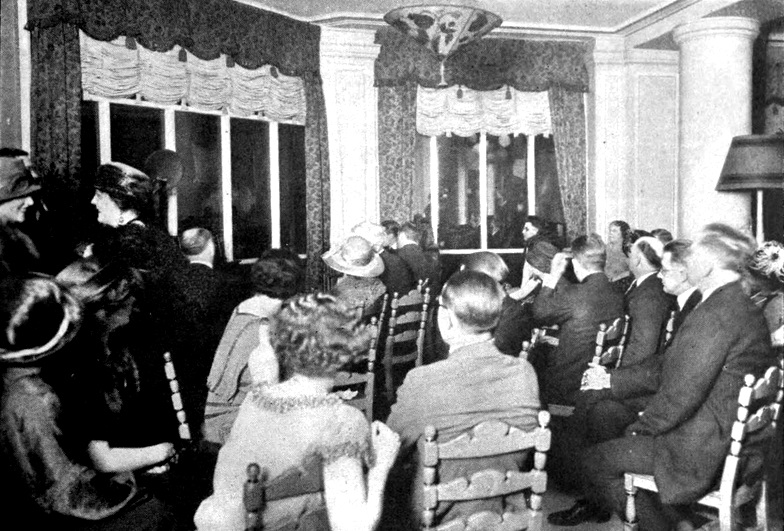
Audiences at the Edgewater Beach Hotel could watch WJAZ studio performances through sound-proofed plate-glass windows (1923)

WJAZ was first licensed on August 17, 1922 to the Chicago Radio Laboratory (reorganized in 1924 as the Zenith Radio Corporation), for operation on the standard "entertainment" wavelength of 360 meters (833 kHz). Its call letters were randomly assigned from a sequential alphabetical list maintained by the Department of Commerce.

WJAZ initially had a very limited broadcasting schedule. It gained prominence when it began broadcasting from a newly constructed studio located on the ground floor of the Edgewater Beach Hotel on May 12, 1923. For publicity, the general public was invited to watch performances through soundproof three-ply plate glass windows. The transmitter and antenna were located adjacent to the hotel building.

The station provided general entertainment programming, and was primarily used to promote the sale of Zenith-brand radio receivers. One unusual feature was a series of midnight transmissions, operating under the experimental call sign "9XN", as one of the stations communicating with Dr. Donald B. MacMillan's Arctic expedition aboard the schooner Bowdoin, which became icebound and isolated 11 degrees below the North Pole.

Effective May 15, 1923, government regulators allocated a band of "Class B" frequencies, reserved for stations that had quality programming and more powerful transmitters. 670 kHz was allocated for use in the Chicago area, and both WJAZ and WMAQ (now WSCR) were assigned to this frequency on a timesharing basis. Zenith soon found that operating a high-powered station within Chicago city limits caused extensive "blanketing" interference to nearby receivers, and decided to relocate WJAZ to a suburban transmitter site. A short-term agreement was made with the Chicago Tribune to take over the existing station's programming, which went into effect on March 29, 1924, and at the same time the station's call letters were changed to WGN and the transmitting frequency to 810 kHz. The Tribune agreement only lasted a few weeks, and the station was then sold to the Edgewater Beach Hotel management, which changed the call letters to WEBH.

=== Temporary transfer (1924) ===
In order to maintain control over the WJAZ call letters while the new suburban facility was under construction, Zenith arranged to have the call sign of its second, low-powered Chicago station, located at the McCormick building and broadcasting on 1120 kHz, changed from WSAX to WJAZ.

=== Portable station (1924–1925) ===
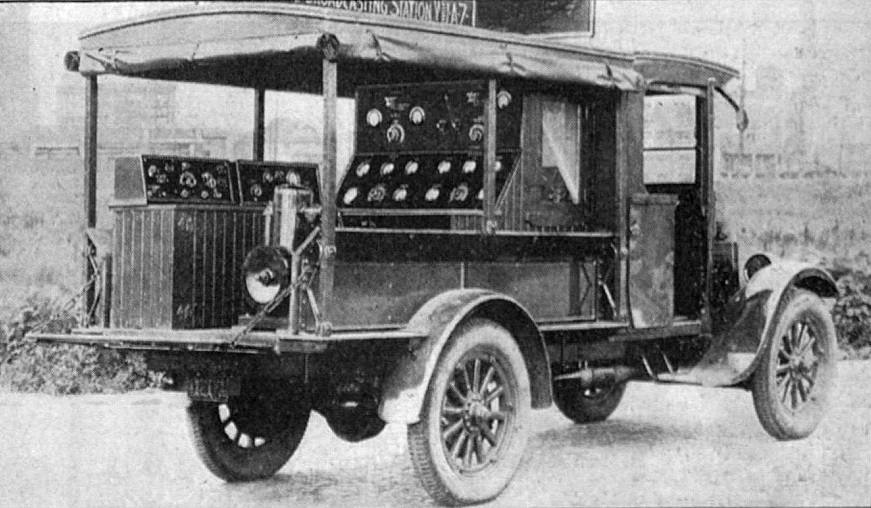
In 1924-1925 the WJAZ call letters were assigned to a "motor truck" mounted portable transmitter, used to evaluate potential permanent transmitter sites around Chicago.

Many communities surrounding Chicago expressed interest in becoming the permanent location for the re-established WJAZ. Zenith's president, E. F. McDonald, Jr., was quoted as saying "...the station will be erected where the community desires it. It goes without saying that a lot of advertising benefits will accrue to the place that will get the new WJAZ." However, the communities may not have been fully aware that they would only be hosting the transmitter site, with the station's studios remaining in Chicago.

In order to evaluate the various locations, as well as generate publicity for the parent company, in the fall of 1924 Zenith constructed a 100-watt portable broadcasting station, mounted on the back of a 1-ton Federal-Knight truck. The WJAZ call sign was transferred to this mobile outfit, which also transmitted on 1120 kHz. Befitting a portable, the station was completely self contained: the storage batteries that powered the transmitter were charged by an on-board generator, and it carried its own antenna, with gold-plated antenna wires supported by telescoping masts. (At this time, Zenith's low-powered station which temporarily held the WJAZ call letters reverted to its original call sign of WSAX.)

Zenith reported that it would be evaluating sites within 100 miles (160 km) of Chicago. Broadcasts from each community featured entertainment plus speeches by local dignitaries. During the solar eclipse of January 24, 1925, the station was transported to Escanaba, Michigan, to document the effects of the dimming sun on radio transmissions.

Following the selection of Mount Prospect as the permanent transmitter site, the portable station began making publicity tours, first through the midwest, followed by the western states, including Pikes Peak, Colorado. During the summer of 1925, in order to free up the call letters for transfer to the new permanent station, the portable's call sign was changed to WSAX.

=== Re-licensing (1925) ===
Following completion of the Mount Prospect transmission site, Zenith's revived WJAZ was licensed on October 1, 1925. Its new studio was located on the 23rd floor of the Straus Building in Chicago. The station's quality equipment and high power qualified it for classification as a "Class B" station. However, during the previous year the number of well-financed stations had steadily increased, and regulators at the Department of Commerce initially believed that there were no unused "Class B" assignments available for use by the station.

In response, E. F. McDonald developed a compromise. He noted that KOA, the powerful General Electric station in Denver, Colorado, which had been exclusively assigned to the Class B frequency of 930 kHz, did not broadcast on Thursday nights, when it and other local stations observed "silent night", staying off the air so that local listeners could receive distant stations. Thus, McDonald proposed that, with KOA off the air, WJAZ could be permitted to broadcast on 930 kHz on Thursday evenings for two hours, from 10:00 p.m. to midnight Central time. In addition, McDonald reassured the Department of Commerce that "Our station is concerned with the sole purpose of giving to the public the highest form of entertainment in but a limited time. We have felt that to do this, sufficient high class talent could not be secured continuously throughout the year for more than two hours a week." KOA management, plus two Cincinnati stations operating on an adjacent frequency, consented to this arrangement.

==== "Wave piracy" legal dispute (1926) ====
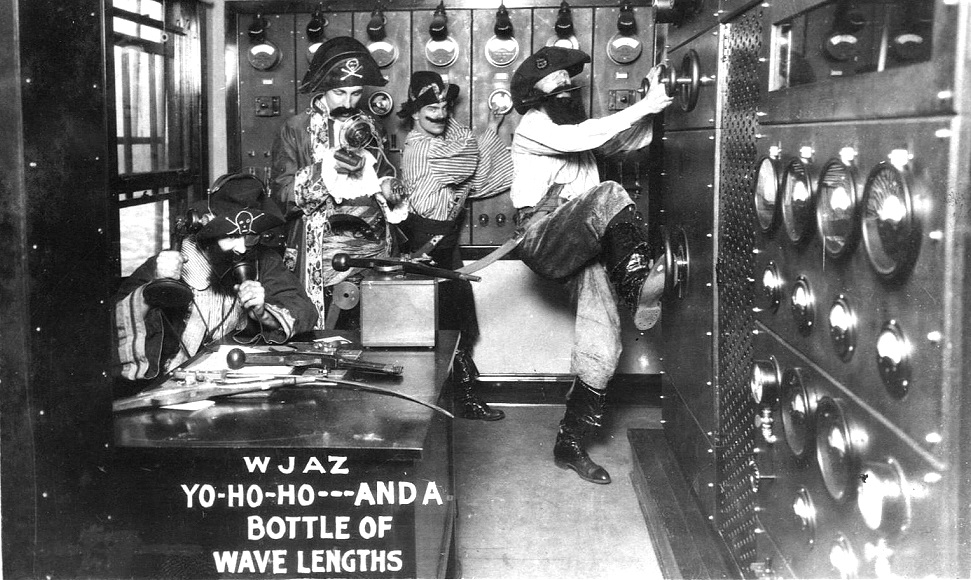
February 1926 publicity photograph of the WJAZ engineering staff dressed as "wave pirates".

Despite E. F. McDonald's initial expression of satisfaction with a broadcast schedule of just two hours per week, he soon began demanding expanded hours after partnering with the Chicago Herald for additional programming, and Zenith's general counsel, Irving Herriott, later testified that "At no time was it the intention to be satisfied with two hours a week." The United States at this time had an informal agreement with Canada that six designated AM band frequencies would be used exclusively by Canadian stations. In early January 1926, McDonald directed WJAZ to move from its 930 kHz assignment to 910 kHz, one of the restricted Canadian frequencies, and begin expanded hours of operation. The U.S. government accused WJAZ of "pirating" the Canadian frequency and ordered the station to return to 930 kHz, while threatening legal action if it did not comply. However, McDonald was defiant, countering that "...Zenith Radio Corporation intends to litigate in every possible way the questions involved". On February 5, 1926, WJAZ broadcast the operetta "The Pirate", and publicity photographs of engineering staff dressed as "wave pirates" were distributed to newspapers and magazines.

On January 20, the federal suit United States versus Zenith Radio Corporation and E. F. McDonald was filed in Chicago. McDonald expected a narrow ruling in his favor, claiming that only a small number of stations, including WJAZ, held the "Class D Developmental" licenses that were free from normal restrictions. However, some earlier legal challenges had raised doubts about the extent that the Department of Commerce, under the provisions of the Radio Act of 1912, could restrict licenses and designate transmitting frequencies, and the actual outcome was sweeping. On April 16, 1926, Judge James H. Wilkerson's ruling was announced, which stated that under the 1912 Act the Commerce Department in fact could not limit the number of broadcasting licenses issued, or designate station frequencies. The U.S. government reviewed whether to appeal this decision, but Acting Attorney General William Donovan sided with the original decision.

The immediate result of the court case was a large increase in the number of stations, reaching over 730 by the time the Radio Act of 1927 was passed in February 1927 to restore government control. This act formed the Federal Radio Commission (FRC), which was tasked with undoing the disruption which the WJAZ case had triggered. On May 3, 1927 the first of numerous reassignments shifted WJAZ away from the Canadian frequency to 760 kHz, and this was followed the next month by a move to 1140 kHz. On November 11, 1928, implementation of the FRC's General Order 40 resulted in a major reorganization of the AM broadcasting band. WJAZ was reassigned to 1480 kHz, and required to divide hours on this frequency with two other Illinois stations: WHT in Deerfield, and WORD in Batavia.

==== Station deletion (1931) ====
In early 1929 a newly licensed station, WCKY in Covington, Kentucky, was added as a fourth assignment to the three Chicago-area stations broadcasting on 1480 kHz. The grant specified that WCKY would receive 4/7ths of the available broadcasting hours, with WJAZ and the other two stations allocated 1/7th time each, moreover, WCKY "was to have first choice of the broadcasting time". In early 1930 all four stations were reassigned from 1480 kHz to 1490 kHz. (WCKY had been encountering mutual interference over much of Kentucky and Tennessee with WLAC Nashville's operation on 1490 kHz; at this same time WLAC moved to 1470 kHz).

WHT changed call letters twice, to WSOA in early 1929, and WCHI in early 1930, and was subsequently deleted on October 31, 1930, after which its former timeshare partner, WORD, changed its own call sign to WCHI and relocated to Deerfield.

Unsatisfied with its somewhat limited schedule, WCKY petitioned the FRC to delete the two remaining Chicago-area stations, and give it unlimited use of the frequency. An FRC examiner recommended that this request be denied, however a review by the full commission ruled in favor of WCKY on October 30, 1931, and ordered both WJAZ and WCHI deleted. As part of its justification, the Commission noted that, even though WJAZ was only allocated two hours a day, it was not broadcasting during all of its available hours, in addition to operating with less than its full authorized power of 5,000 watts.

WJAZ was deleted on November 23, 1931, however WCHI appealed the ruling, arguing that not only should it be allowed to remain on the air, but it, rather than WCKY, should have been assigned the hours previously used by WJAZ. The appeal was unsuccessful, and WCHI was formally deleted on May 7, 1932.

== Recap ==
Summary of the four Chicago stations which held the WJAZ call sign from 1922 to 1931.

#	First license	WJAZ call letter usage	Later history
1	August 17, 1922 as WJAZ.	August 17, 1922 until March 1924	Call sign became WGN in March 1924, and WEBH on March 29, 1924. WEBH was deleted in November 1928 when it was consolidated with KYW.
2	Summer of 1923 as WSAX.	Mid-1924.	Call sign changed back to WSAX later in 1924. Station deleted, summer of 1925.
3	Fall of 1924 as WJAZ (portable).	Fall of 1924 until summer of 1925.	Call sign changed to WSAX in the summer of 1925. On May 25, 1928, the Federal Radio Commission's General Order 32 notified WSAX that "From an examination of your application for future license it does not find that public interest, convenience, or necessity would be served by granting it." Although the station was given the opportunity to challenge this finding, it instead surrendered its license in July 1928.
4	October 1, 1925 as WJAZ (Mount Prospect transmitter site).	October 1, 1925 until November 23, 1931.	Station deleted on November 23, 1931 after hours assigned to WCKY.
