= Portable broadcasting stations in the United States =

Review of U.S. portable broadcasting stations

Portable broadcasting stations in the United States was a category of AM band radio stations, which were not restricted to operation in a specific community, but instead were permitted to be transported for broadcasting from various locations. These authorizations began in the early 1920s during a period when radio regulation in the United States was the responsibility of the Department of Commerce. However, after the newly formed Federal Radio Commission (FRC) took over in early 1927, it was decided that allowing stations to make unrestricted relocations was impractical, and in 1928 the FRC announced that existing portables that had not settled into permanent locations would be deleted. Station owner C. L. Carrell attempted to overturn the new policy, but was unsuccessful.

== Overview ==
From 1922 to 1929, the U.S. government authorized approximately 45 portable broadcasting stations operating on the standard AM band. These stations could be transported to various locations, and normally did not operate while in motion. The station equipment was most commonly mounted on automobiles, trucks, buses and trains, yachts, and in one case, an airplane (KHAC/KFBI). Five stations — KFVP, KRCA, KUPR, WEAL and WEBM — did not receive standard licenses but instead operated under temporary authorizations.

The stations were used for a wide variety of purposes. Some were employed by their owners for company demonstrations and technical investigations. Others were hired out, generally for few weeks at a time, to theaters or local newspapers, commonly located in small midwestern towns that didn't have their own radio stations, to be used for special programs broadcast to a local audience. However, in a few cases the station's travels were nationwide, most notably KGGM (now KNML), which in 1928 was installed on a bus and accompanied the runners on a cross-country foot race from Los Angeles to New York City.

Another prominent portable station was the Zenith Radio Company's WJAZ (later WSAX), a truck-mounted station initially constructed to evaluate potential transmitter sites around Chicago for a proposed new company-owned station. WJAZ also participated during the solar eclipse of January 24, 1925, when it was driven to a location within the path of totality at Escanaba, Michigan in order to test the effects of the sun's dimming on radio transmissions. (The Edison Electric Company's WTAT was also employed to document the effects of the eclipse. In its case the station was loaded aboard the United States Coast Guard cutter Tampa, which sailed to the center of totality off the coast of Rhode Island.)

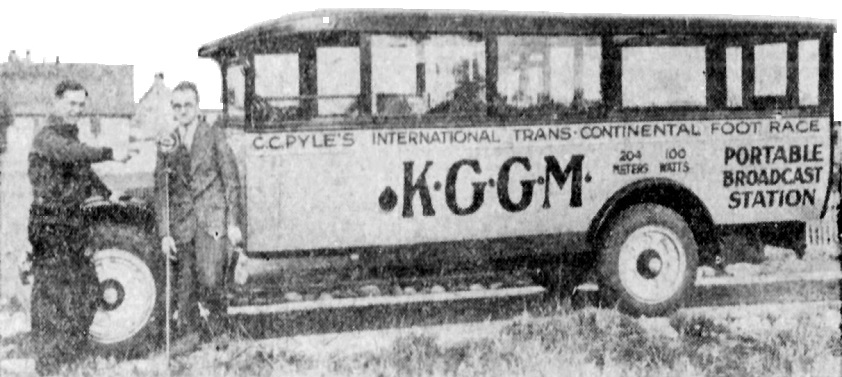
1928 publicity photograph of KGGM, used each evening along the route of a coast-to-coast foot race.

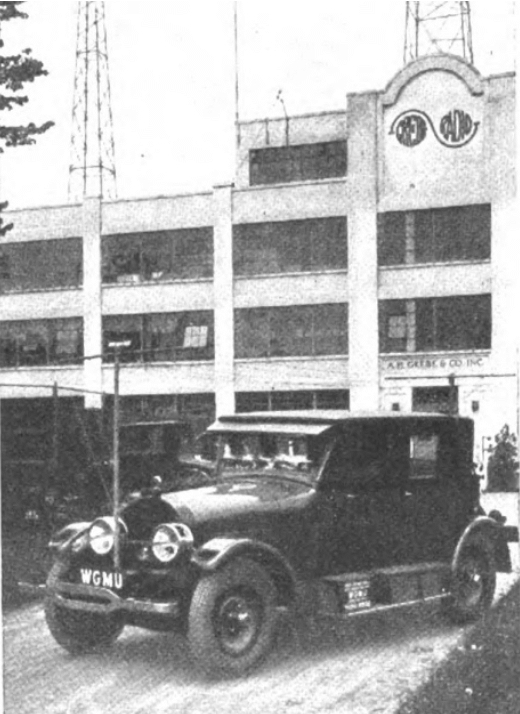
A. H. Grebe Company's WGMU, installed on a Lincoln automobile body and based in New York City (1925)

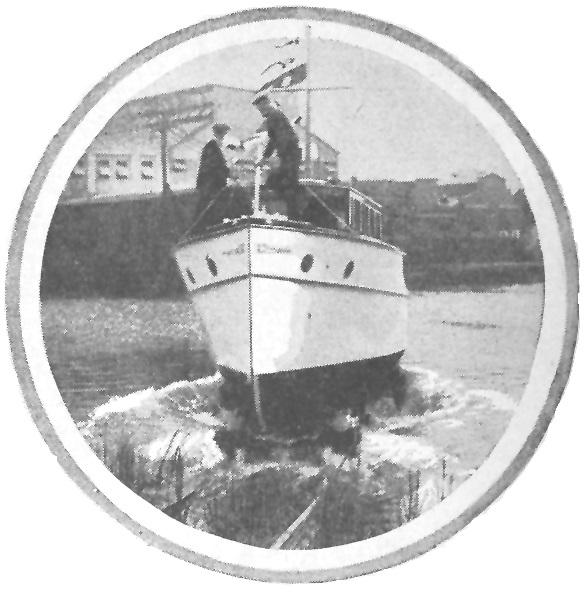
A. H. Grebe Company's WRMU, installed on the MU-1 yacht based in Richmond Hill, New York City (1926)

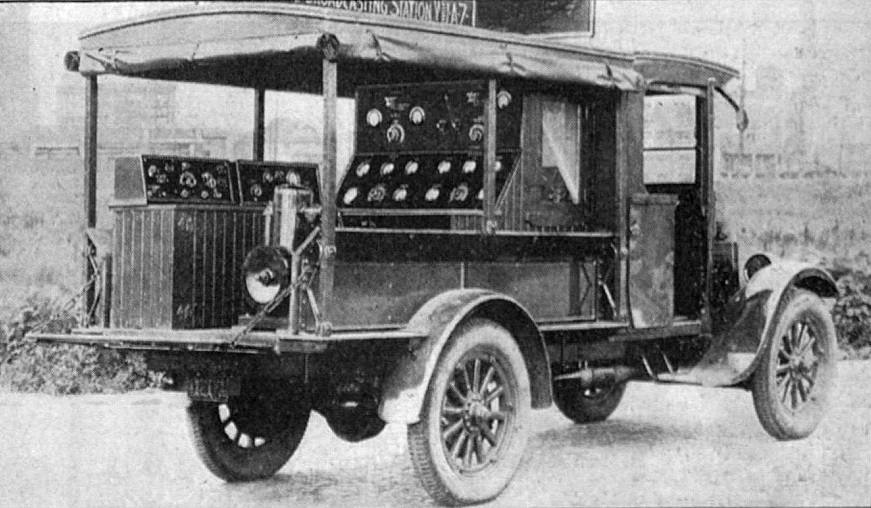
In 1924-1925 the callsign WJAZ was assigned to a "motor truck" mounted portable transmitter, used to evaluate potential permanent transmitter sites around Chicago.

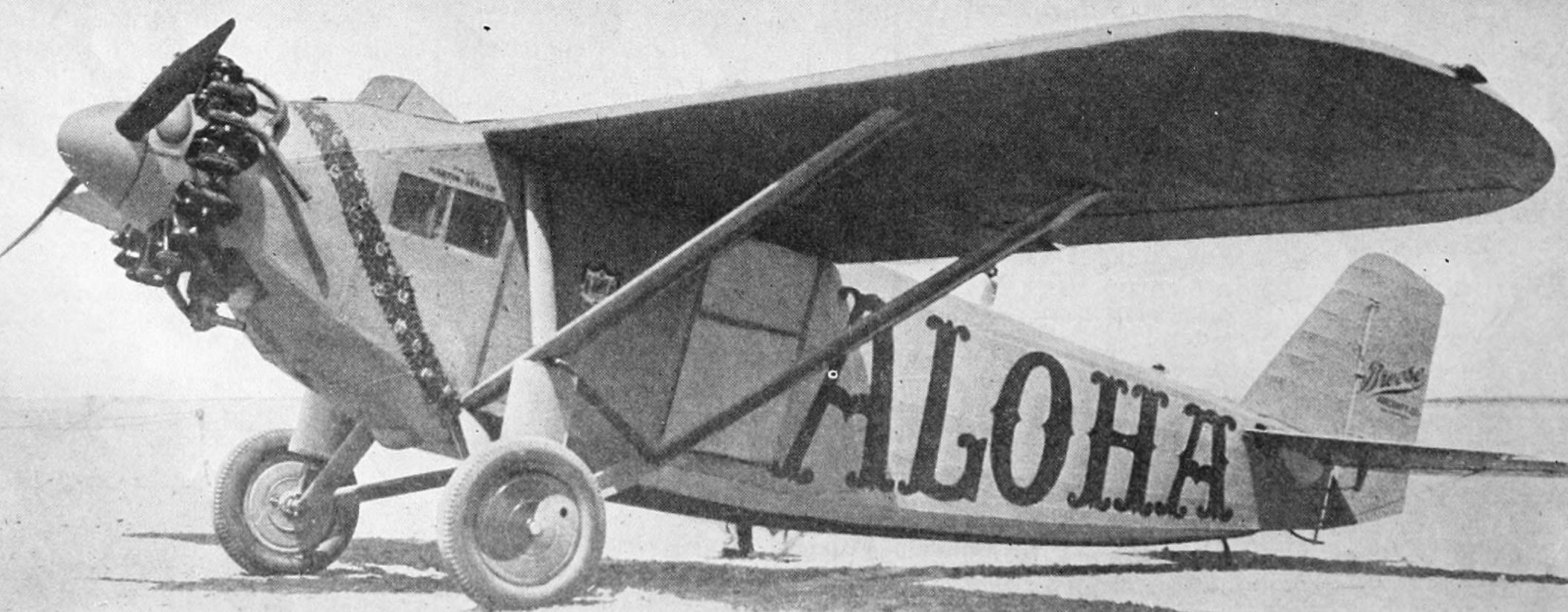
Breese-Wilde Model 5 airplane (KHAC (later KFBI), 1927)

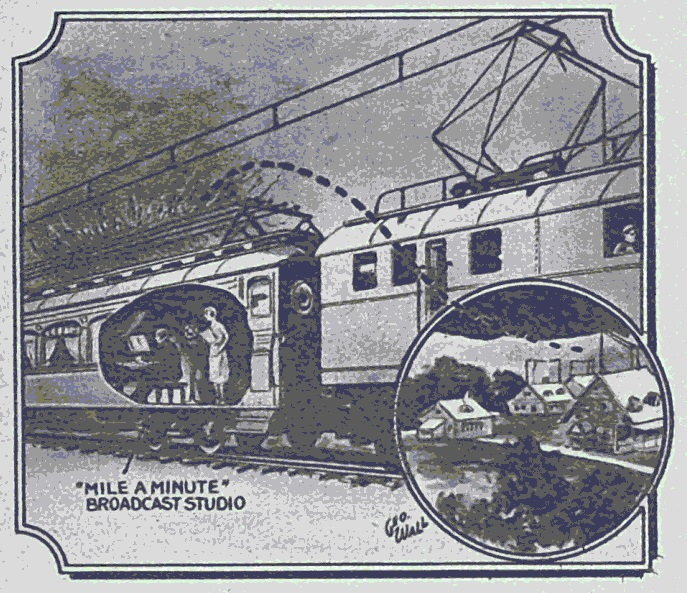
Beginning on July 1, 1927, WHBL was placed on a train railcar.

These stations were initially seen as a useful way to introduce the general public in small- and mid-sized towns to the innovation of radio broadcasting. However, as the number of permanently located stations increased, the portables began to be seen as a nuisance, as their mobility made it difficult to control the interference they caused to other stations transmitting on the same frequency.

The Federal Radio Commission (FRC) was formed in early 1927, and was charged with bringing stability to the sometimes chaotic state of the AM broadcast band. As part of its efforts, on April 26, 1927, it released General Order 6, which stated that "Since the exact location of any radio broadcasting transmitter is an essential feature of the license, the Federal Radio Commission, as already announced, will not consider any application for a broadcasting license, except for a very limited period of time, in which the permanent location of the transmitter is not specified." The order also limited portable station license periods to no more than 120 days, with the further restriction that they would be limited to operating "with not more than 100 watts power output", and would only be assigned to one of two transmitting frequencies, either 1470 kHz or 1490 kHz.

Subsequently, the FRC's General Order 30, adopted May 10, 1928, specified that all portable stations which had not found permanent homes would have to cease operating by July 1. Fifteen days later, General Order 34 restated the coming prohibition, noting that there were currently eleven active portable stations, whose licenses would expire as of 3 a.m. July 1, 1928.

The portable stations which had not found permanent sites were duly deleted by the fall of 1928, with one exception: KGIF, licensed to Robert B. Howell of Omaha, Nebraska, used in conjunction with his Senate campaign, which remained authorized until the next year, with its location specified as being "Nebraska", and a power of just 7 1/2 watts.

=== C. L. Carrell ===
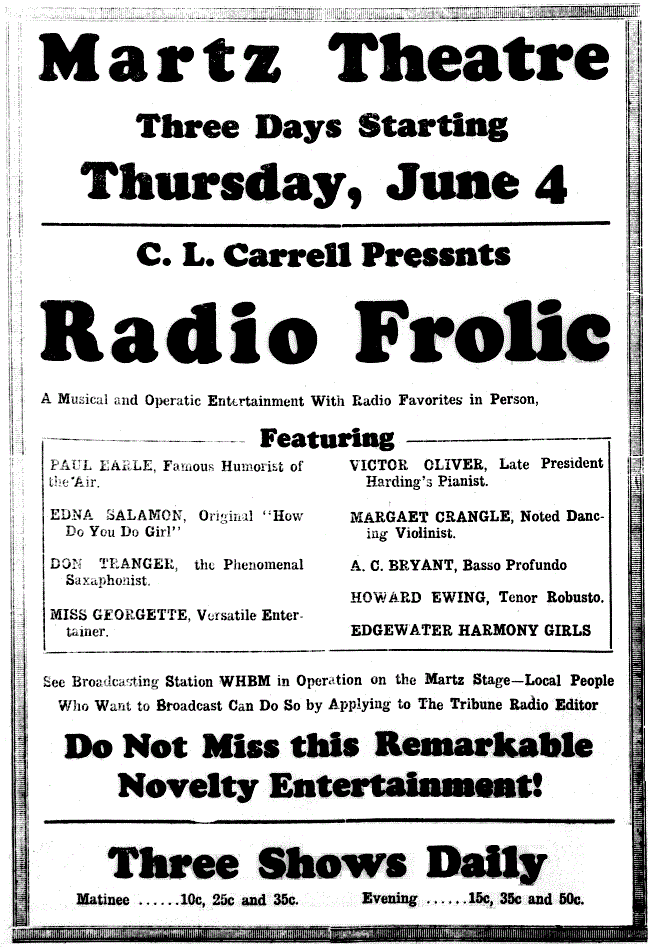
June 1925 advertisement promoting WHBM's theater broadcasts at Tipton, Indiana

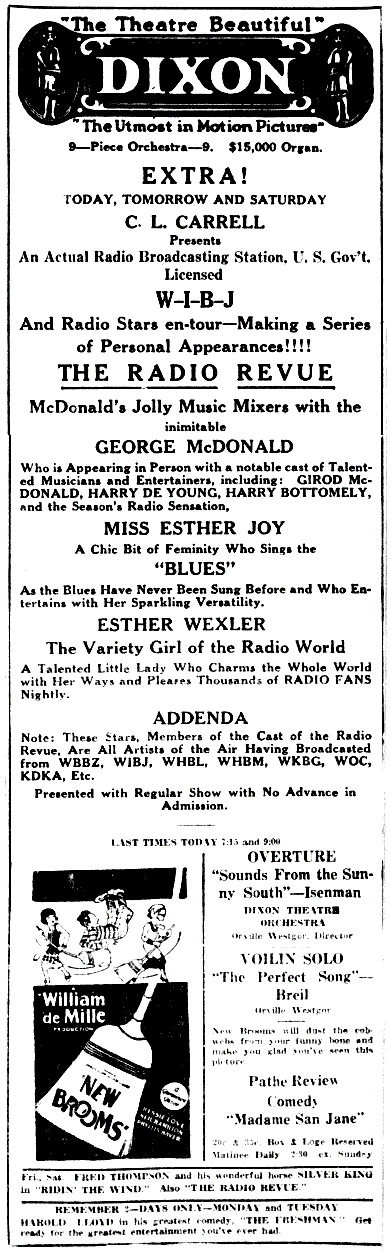
October 1925 advertisement promoting WIBJ's theater broadcasts at Dixon, Illinois

The person most associated with portable broadcasting stations, and the individual most affected by their elimination, was Charles "C. L." Carrell, an entertainment promoter based in Chicago. Starting with three stations that were initially licensed under his own name — WHBM, WIBJ and WKBG — he expanded his holdings by taking over portable station WIBM, originally licensed to Billy Maine, and purchasing three central Indiana standard stations — WBBZ, WHBL and WIBW — which were converted into portables. Thus, by the end of 1926, Carrell had a roster of seven stations, leased out through the C. L. Carrell Broadcasting Service.

Carrell commonly used his portable stations, in conjunction with local small-town theaters, to broadcast entertainment programs featuring radio personalities from major cities. A May 1925 Logansport, Indiana event, broadcast by Carrell's WHBL, was advertised as: "Starting Sunday, May 24, 4 days, C. L. Carrell Brings to Logansport a New Radio Frolic. All New Radio Stars in a New Musical Review with a Broadcasting Station In Actual Operation on the Luna Stage". A February 1926 advertisement for WBBZ's visit to Manitowoc, Wisconsin invited the curious to: "Come See---Hear, and be taken into the mysteries of radio broadcasting". Over time Carrell's stations began staying in individual communities for longer periods of time, and included local entertainers, in part to judge whether establishing a permanent station was financially viable.

Following the FRC's announcement that it was eliminating portable stations, Carrell procured permanent locations for four of his stations, however the other three, WHBM, WIBJ and WKBG, were eventually deleted. He petitioned the FRC to reverse the deletions, but was turned down. He then appealed the decision to the District of Columbia Court of Appeals, which also ruled against him, stating:

"It is contended on behalf of the Commission that the licensing of portable broadcasting stations is not in the public interest, convenience, or necessity; that the Davis Amendment to the Radio Act of 1927 (45 Stat. 373) contemplates fixed allocation of broadcasting stations, and its mandate cannot be carried out if roving transmitters are allowed to operate; that under the allocation of stations as at present established the operation of migratory transmitters would result in harmful interference; that the difficulties of supervision of portable stations render it against public interest to license them; and that to permit portable broadcasting stations to rove at will over a portion of the country on any one broadcasting channel would deprive the public of the service of that channel to its full capacity. We think that the Commission acted within its authority when dealing with portable stations as a class... The order appealed from is accordingly affirmed at the cost of appellant."

Carrell was also unable to convince the FRC to reactivate the station licenses so that they could be transferred to permanent locations. He went on to manage WBBZ, which had been relocated to Ponca City, Oklahoma, until his death in 1933, following which his widow, Adelaide Lillian Carrell, took over as owner and station manager until 1949.

== List of stations ==
- NOTE: In the chart below, actions for which the monthly Radio Service Bulletin is used as the primary reference list the date of the issue which contains the announcement. In most cases the action took place sometime during month preceding the issue date, however, in cases where there was delay in making the official notification, the action might have occurred even earlier.

Call	Initial portable authorization	Owner's Location	Owner	Notes
KFBN	9/1/1922	Oakland, California	Borch Radio Corp.	Deleted 2/1/1923.
KFFZ	5/1/1923	Dallas, Texas	Al. G. Barnes Amusement Co.	Barnes operated a "Wild Animal Circus" which wintered near Love Field. Station was intended to be used while the circus was touring, with the plan that its "many voices are to be sent into places it intends to visit and to many other localities that, except for radio, would never experience the thrills that come with a circus". Deleted 7/1/1924.
KFJQ	9/1/1923	Grand Forks, North Dakota	Electric Construction Co., valley radio division	Deleted 11/1/1923. (Relicensed two months later as a standard station, deleted 12/1/1924.)
KFRI	11/1/1924	Denver, Colorado	Reynolds Radio Company	To be used "On moving train in western Nebraska". It was reported that "Baseball scores from the world series were received while the train was travelling at thirty-five miles per hour." Deleted 1/2/1925.
KFVP	5/10/1925	Omaha, Nebraska	Omaha Chamber of Commerce	Temporary authorization for passenger train, May 10–24, 1925.
KFVP	5/24/1925	Sioux Falls, South Dakota	Sioux Falls Chamber of Commerce	Temporary authorization for passenger train, May 24–29, 1925.
KFXJ	9/16/1925	Denver, Colorado	Mountain States Radio Distributors, Inc.	Moved to Edgewater, Colorado (near), no longer a portable station, with owner R. G. Howell (Olinger Gardens), on 9/30/1926. Currently KNZZ in Denver, Colorado
KFYJ	11/2/1925	Houston, Texas	Texas Chronicle Publishing Co.	1220 kHz. Deleted in May 1927 after failing to apply for a license from the recently established Federal Radio Commission.
KGFO	5/31/1927	Los Angeles, California	Brant Radio Company	Deleted 7/31/1928.
KGGM	8/17/1927	Inglewood, California	Jay Peters	In 1928 broadcast each evening along the route of a coast-to-coast foot race. Permanently moved to Albuquerque, New Mexico 9/29/1928. Currently KNML, Albuquerque.
KGIF	8/31/1928	Omaha, Nebraska	Robert B. Howell	Station was placed in an automobile, and used to broadcast speeches after stopping in various towns, as part of Howell's successful senatorial re-election campaign. Deleted 5/31/1929.
KHAC/KFBI	11/30/1927	San Francisco, California	Flying Broadcasters, Inc.	Assigned to "unnamed airplane". Call changed from KHAC to KFBI 2/29/1928. Made test broadcast over Hayward, California. Deleted 7/31/1928.
KRCA	9/5/1925	Los Angeles, California	Radio Corporation of America	Station operated under a series of temporary authorizations at four different fairs and expositions. The first assignment was in September 1925 for Los Angeles. Three more assignments followed a year later in August and September 1926: San Francisco, Los Angeles, and Riverside, California.
KUPR	8/12/1925	Omaha, Nebraska	Union Pacific Railroad	Temporary 45 day authorization. Reports about the Calf Club Special train (which used some of the same equipment previously used by KFVP), reviewed the itinerary of its "tour to every vital point of agricultural Nebraska" while employing the "latest innovation in mobile broadcast stations". Deleted 9/11/25.
WALK	2/28/1927	Bethayres, Pennsylvania	Albert A. Walker	Reported as "no longer portable" 6/30/1927, and permanently settled in Willow Grove, Pennsylvania 12/31/1927. Deleted 4/30/1929.
WBBZ	10/1/1925	Chicago, Illinois	C. L. Carrell	Originally licensed 3/1/1924 as a fixed station to Noble B. Watson, Indianapolis, Indiana. Permanently located in Ponca City, Oklahoma 7/31/1928. Currently WBBZ, Ponca City.
WCBG	3/1/1924	Pascagoula, Mississippi	Howard S. Williams	Deleted 12/31/1925.
WCBR	4/8/1924	Providence, Rhode Island	Charles H. Messter	Deleted 7/31/1928.
WCBS	8/19/1926	Providence, Rhode Island	Harold L. Dewing and Charles H. Messter	Moved to Springfield, Illinois sometime between 1/31/1927 and 5/3/1927. Currently WFMB in Springfield.
WCWS	11/2/1925	Providence, Rhode Island	Charles W. Selen	Owners changed to Bridgeport Broadcasting Station (Harold D. Feuer and Charles W. Selen) 2/28/1927, later based in Danbury, Connecticut. Call changed to WCON 4/30/1928. Deleted 7/31/1928.
WEAL	6/00/1922	Des Moines, Iowa	Mystic Shrine	Temporary authorization for "special train... to coast and back". Train scheduled to depart on June 8 for a meeting of "imperial council of the ancient Arabic order of Nobles of the Mystic Shrine" in San Francisco, with two transmitters, of 10 and 100 watts. Operated by the "Za-Ga-Zig temple", with concerts planned at stops along the way.
WEBL	9/2/1924	New York, New York	Radio Corporation of America	Deletion was unreported, but occurred sometime between 12/31/1926 and 5/3/1927.
WEBM	8/27/1924	Detroit, Michigan	Detroit Yacht Club	"let 8/19/24", "temp 8/27/24 to 9/1/24" 1030 kHz. Used to report yacht regatta race. Located on George Harrison Phelps' yacht "Skylark II".
WEBM	2/2/1925	New York, New York	Radio Corporation of America	Deleted 2/27/1926.
WGBH	2/2/1925	Fall River, Massachusetts	Fall River Herald Publishing Co.	Deleted 8/1/1925.
WGMU	7/1/1925	Richmond Hill, New York	A. H. Grebe & Company	Also employed a shortwave transmitter to relay remote programming for broadcasts over WAHG. Deleted 7/31/1928.
WHBL	1/30/1926	Chicago, Illinois	C. L. Carrell	Initially licensed 3/35/1925 as a fixed station to James H. Slusser, Logansport, Indiana. Beginning 7/1/1927, the station was placed on a Chicago, Milwaukee and St. Paul railcar. Permanently moved to Sheboygan, Wisconsin, with owners Press Publishing Co. and C. L. Carrell, 2/29/1928. Station continues to exist in Sheboygan as WHBL.
WHBM	3/10/1925	Chicago, Illinois	C. L. Carrell	Deleted 9/29/1928.
WIBJ	5/11/1925	Chicago, Illinois	C. L. Carrell	Deleted 9/29/1928.
WIBL	6/1/1925	Chicago, Illinois	McDonald Radio Co.	Deleted 9/1/1925.
WIBM	6/3/1925	Chicago, Illinois	Billy Maine	Transferred to C. L. Carrell 12/31/1926. Moved to Jackson, Michigan 7/31/1928. Currently WIBM, Jackson.
WIBS	6/29/1925	Elizabeth, New Jersey	N.J. National Guard; 57th Infantry Brigade	Reported as "no longer portable" 6/30/1927. Currently WZRC, New York, New York.
WIBT	8/1/1925	New York, New York	Orlando E. Miller	Deleted 11/2/1925.
WIBW	12/31/1926	Chicago, Illinois	C. L. Carrell	Originally licensed 8/1/1925 as a fixed station to L. L. Dill, Logansport, Indiana. Permanently moved to Topeka, Kansas 1/31/1928. Currently WIBW in Topeka.
WJAZ/WSAX	10/1/1924	Chicago, Illinois	Chicago Radio Laboratory	Call changed to WSAX 9/1/1925. Deleted 8/1/1928.
WKBG	6/2/1925	Chicago, Illinois	C. L. Carrell	Deleted 9/29/1928.
WKBU	12/31/1926	New Castle, Pennsylvania	H. K. Armstrong	Deleted 11/30/1927.
WKBY	10/30/1926	Danville, Pennsylvania	Fernwood Quick	Deletion was unreported, but occurred sometime between 2/28/1927 and 5/3/27.
WLBH	12/31/1926	Farmingdale, New York	Joseph J. Lombardi	No longer listed as portable 6/30/1927. Changed to WPOE, Patchogue, New York 4/30/1929. Deleted 1/30/1932.
WLBN	12/31/1926	Chicago, Illinois	William E. Hiler	Changed to Little Rock, Arkansas 3/31/1928. Call changed to KLRA 6/30/1928. Deleted in 1995 as KSYG.
WMBA	12/31/1926	Newport, Rhode Island	Le Roy J. Beebe	Reported to be "no longer portable" 3/31/1928. Deleted 11/30/1932.
WMBH	1/10/1927	Chicago, Illinois	Edwin D. Aber	Reported to be in Joplin, Missouri and "no longer portable" 7/30/1927. Currently KQYX, Galena, Kansas
WOBR	8/31/1927	Shelby, Ohio	Earl Smith	Deleted 7/31/1928.
WRMU	8/1/1925	Richmond Hill, New York	A. H. Grebe & Company	MU-1 yacht. Also employed a shortwave transmitter to relay remote programming for broadcasts over WAHG). Deleted 7/31/1928.
WTAT/WATT	10/1/1923	Boston, Massachusetts	Edison Electric Illuminating Company	Call changed from WTAT to WATT 1/30/1926. Deleted 7/30/1928.
