= WBBZ (AM) =

- Ponca City, Oklahoma; United States
- Frequency: 1230 kHz
- Branding: Newstalk 1230

Programming
- Format: News/talk
- Affiliations: Fox News Radio; Compass Media Networks; Premiere Networks; St. Louis Cardinals Radio Network

Ownership
- Owner: Sterling Broadcasting, LLC
- Sister stations: KQSN

History
- First air date: January 30, 1928 (on 1470)
- Former frequencies: 1470 kHz (1928–1929); 1200 kHz (1929–1941)
- Call sign meaning: None (sequentially assigned)

Technical information
- Licensing authority: FCC
- Facility ID: 52931
- Class: C
- Power: 1,000 watts unlimited
- Transmitter coordinates: 36.696111°N 97.051944°W

Links
- Public license information: Public file; LMS
- Webcast: Listen live
- Website: www.myhometownpost.com/wbbz

WBBZ (1230 kHz, "Newstalk 1230") is an AM radio station licensed to Ponca City, Oklahoma. The station broadcasts a news/talk format and is owned by Sterling Broadcasting, LLC.

== History ==
Federal Communications Commission (FCC) records list WBBZ's "Date First Licensed" as September 9, 1925. However, due to the station's complicated history, there are alternate chronologies that trace its founding to either early 1924 or January 1928.

In early 1924 Noble B. Watson in Indianapolis, Indiana, was issued a license for a new station with the sequentially assigned call letters WBBZ. Noble ceased operating the station in May 1925, and the Department of Commerce, regulators of radio at the time, reported that the station had been deleted. However, Noble sold the station equipment to Charles Carrell of Chicago, Illinois, who on September 9, 1925, received a new station license that retained the WBBZ call letters.

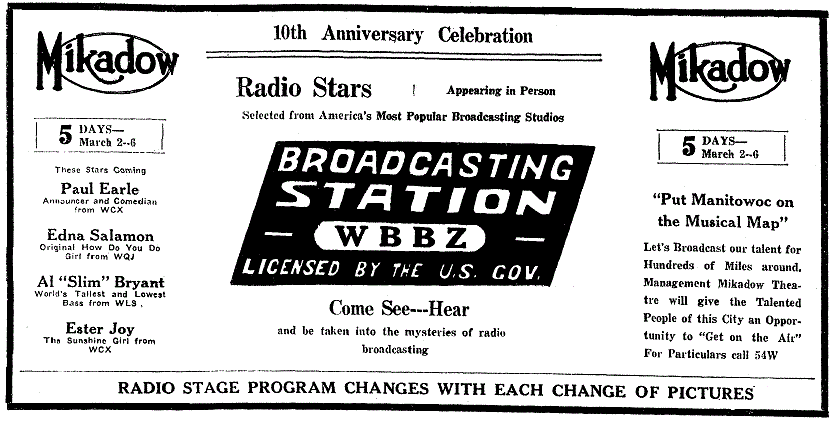
February 1926 advertisement promoting WBBZ's theater broadcasts at Manitowoc, Wisconsin

Carrell outfitted WBBZ as a portable broadcasting station, joining what would eventually be a roster of seven stations that he controlled. These stations were generally hired out for a few weeks at a time to theaters, mostly located in small midwestern towns that did not have their own radio stations, to be used for special programs broadcast to the local community. WBBZ reportedly made its first appearance in Ponca City, Oklahoma, sometime in 1927, when Carrell associate Harry Kyler brought the station to town for a week-long run at the Poncan Theatre. The station later returned for a longer stay at the Theatre, beginning with a broadcast at 7:00 p.m. on January 30, 1928.

In May 1928, the recently formed Federal Radio Commission announced it would soon end the licensing of portable facilities, and the stations were notified that they would be deleted if they did not find permanent homes. Carrell decided to keep WBBZ permanently in Ponca City, while retaining full ownership.

WBBZ was a charter member of the Oklahoma Network when it was formed in 1937.

C. L. Carrell operated WBBZ until his death in 1933, after which his widow, Adelaide Lillian Carrell, took over as owner and station manager. She in turn made arrangements in 1948 to sell the station to the Ponca City Publishing Co., which was finalized early the next year.

On September 12, 2018, WBBZ changed formats from classic hits to adult contemporary, branded as "Sunny 1230", a format transferred from sister station KQSN, which switched to country. On September 6, 2022, WBBZ changed formats from adult contemporary to news/talk.
