= Radio Act of 1912 =

Former United States radio law from 1912 to 1927

- Long title: An Act to Regulate Radio Communication
- Enacted by: the 62nd United States Congress
- Effective: December 13, 1912

Citations
- Public law: Pub. L. 62–264
- Statutes at Large: 37 Stat. 302

Codification
- Acts repealed: Radio Act of 1927

Legislative history
- Introduced in the Senate as S. 6412 by William Alden Smith on May 20, 1912; Passed the Senate on May 7, 1912; Passed the House of Representatives on June 3, 1912; Signed into law by President William Howard Taft on August 13, 1912

The Radio Act of 1912, formally, known as "An Act to Regulate Radio Communication" (37 Stat. 302), is a United States federal law which was the country's first legislation to require licenses for radio stations. It was enacted before the introduction of broadcasting to the general public, and was eventually found to contain insufficient authority to effectively control this new service, so the Act was replaced and the government's regulatory powers increased by the passage of the Radio Act of 1927.

== Background ==
Radio communication (originally known as "wireless telegraphy") was developed in the late 1890s, but it was initially largely unregulated in the United States. The Wireless Ship Act of 1910 mandated that most passenger ships exiting U.S. ports had to carry radio equipment under the supervision of qualified operators, however individual stations remained unlicensed and unregulated. This led to numerous interference issues, including conflicts between amateur radio operators and the U.S. Navy and commercial companies, with a few amateur radio enthusiasts alleged to have sent fake distress calls and obscene messages to naval radio stations, and to have forged naval commands, sending navy boats on spurious missions.

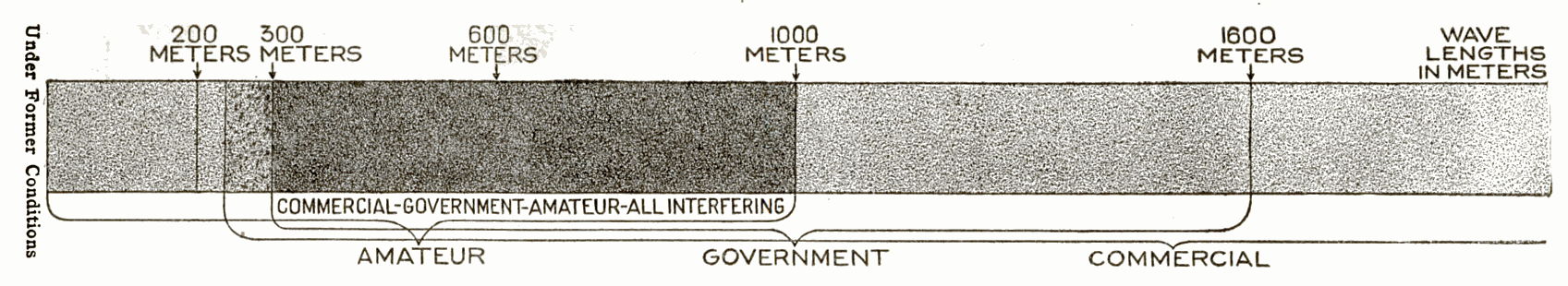
Overlapping usage, and interference, between amateur, government, and commercial wireless operators before the Radio Act of 1912.

The U.S. policy of unrestricted stations differed from most of the rest of the world. The 1906 International Radiotelegraph Convention, held in Berlin, called for countries to license their stations, and although United States representatives had signed this agreement, initially the U.S. Senate did not ratify the treaty. However, the U.S. was told it would not be invited to the next International Radiotelegraph Convention scheduled to be held in London in June 1912 unless it completed ratification, so on April 3, 1912, the U.S. Senate formally accepted the 1906 Convention, and began work on legislation to implement its provisions. The issue gained importance twelve days later due to the sinking of the Titanic, and the new law would also incorporate provisions of the London Convention signed on July 5, 1912, although the United States had not yet ratified the new treaty. The resulting Radio Act of 1912 was signed by President Taft on August 13, 1912, and went into effect December 13, 1912.

== Implementation ==
At this time radio was almost exclusively used for point-to-point communication, and the three major categories of stations were maritime, transoceanic, and amateur. The Act was unusual in including numerous regulations within the text of the bill, in addition to providing a general regulatory framework. A key provision was the restriction of most amateur stations to wavelengths below 200 meters (frequencies above 1500 kHz), an assignment that greatly limited their transmitting range until the discovery a decade later of the great distances achievable through shortwave transmissions.

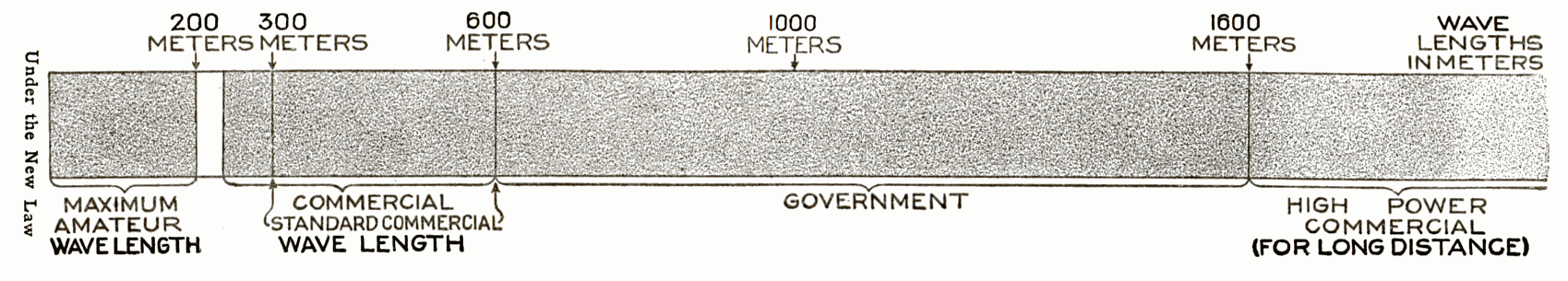
Amateur, government, standard commercial, and high-power commercial (for long distance) wavelength bands defined by the Radio Act of 1912.

Implementation and enforcement of the Act was made the responsibility of the U.S. Department of Commerce and Labor (Department of Commerce after March 1913), which was empowered to impose fines of not more than $500 and to suspend or revoke licenses of operators who violated regulations. Nine regional Radio Inspection districts were designated, with a radio inspector based in a major port within each district.

The broadcasting of news and entertainment to the general public, which began to be significantly developed in early 1920s, was not foreseen by this legislation. The first regulations specifically addressing broadcasting were adopted on December 1, 1921, when two wavelengths were set aside for stations making broadcasts intended for a general audience: 360 meters (833 kHz) for "entertainment", and 485 meters (619 kHz) for "market and weather reports". The number of broadcasting stations grew tremendously in 1922, numbering over 500 in the United States by the end of the year. In 1923, only 1 percent of U.S. households owned at least one radio receiver, while a majority would by 1931.

Herbert Hoover became the Secretary of Commerce in March 1921, and thus assumed primary responsibility for shaping radio broadcasting during its earliest days, which was a difficult task in a fast-changing environment. To aid decision-making, he sponsored a series of four national conferences from 1922 to 1925, where invited industry leaders participated in setting standards for radio in general.

== Legal challenges and replacement ==
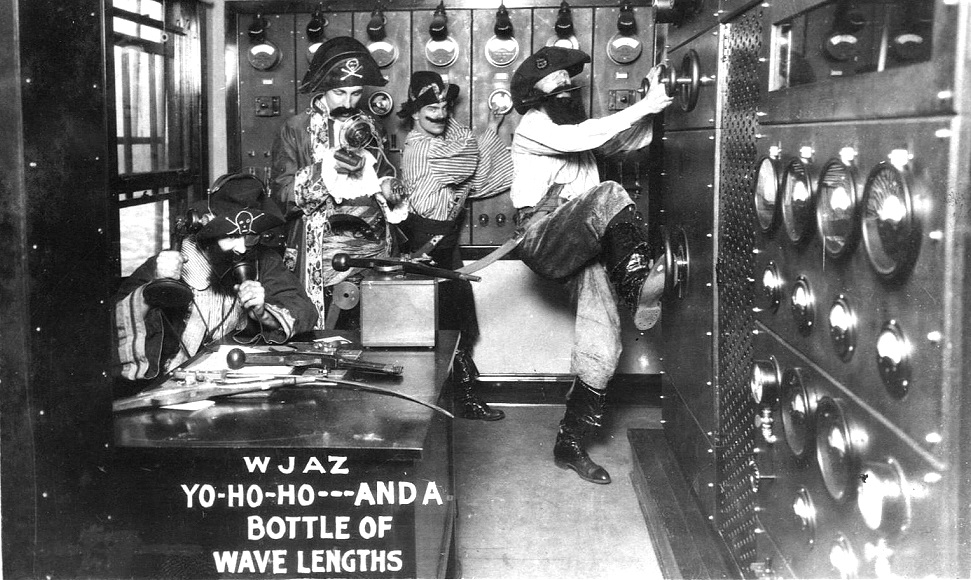
In 1926, station WJAZ successfully challenged the government's authority to assign transmitting frequencies under the Radio Act of 1912.

During his tenure, Hoover was aware that some of his actions were on shaky legal ground, given the limited powers assigned to him by the 1912 Act. In particular, in 1921 the department had tried to refuse to issue a renewal license to a point-to-point radiotelegraph station in New York City, operated by the Intercity Radio Company, on the grounds that it was causing excessive interference to earlier radiotelegraph stations operating nearby. Intercity appealed, and in 1923 the Court of Appeals of the District of Columbia sided with Intercity, stating the 1912 Act did not provide for licensing decisions at "the discretion of an executive officer". The Department of Commerce planned to request a review by the Supreme Court, but the case was rendered moot when Intercity decided to shut down the New York City station. Still, it had raised significant questions about the extent of Hoover's authority.

A second, ultimately successful, challenge occurred in 1926. The Zenith Radio Corporation in late 1925 established a high-powered radio station in Chicago, WJAZ. Due to a lack of available frequencies, the station was only authorized to transmit two hours each week. Based on the Intercity Radio Company ruling, company president E. F. McDonald decided to challenge the government by moving the station to a frequency previously reserved for use in Canada. On April 16, 1926, Judge James H. Wilkerson's ruling stated that, under the 1912 Act, the Commerce Department in fact could not limit the number of broadcasting licenses issued, or designate station frequencies. The government reviewed whether to try to appeal this decision, but Acting Attorney General William J. Donovan's analysis concurred with the court's decision.

The adverse ruling showcased the deficiencies of the 1912 Act. Thus, on February 23, 1927, a replacement, the Radio Act of 1927, was signed into law by President Calvin Coolidge in order to strengthen the government's ability to effectively regulate radio communication.

== See also ==
- Global Maritime Distress and Safety System (GMDSS)
- History of radio
- Radio Act of 1927
- Sinking of the Titanic
- Wireless Ship Act of 1910
