= Davis Amendment =

1928 US law requiring equitable distribution of radio stations

The Davis Amendment was a provision attached to the March 28, 1928 reauthorization of the Radio Act of 1927, which mandated an "equality of radio broadcasting service" within the United States. It specified an "equitable allocation" among five regional zones, in addition to assignments proportional to population among the states within each zone. Its implementation resulted in the development of a complicated quota system by the Federal Radio Commission, and although its provisions were carried over to the Federal Communications Commission by the Communications Act of 1934, it ultimately proved impractical, and was repealed on June 5, 1936.

== Adoption ==
Radio regulation in the United States had to be suspended in the summer of 1926, when it was ruled that the Commerce Department, operating under the provisions of the Radio Act of 1912, did not have the authority to specify the operating frequencies and powers for broadcasting stations. A period of worsening interference followed, and to restore order the Radio Act of 1927 was approved on February 23, 1927. This act created a new five member body, the Federal Radio Commission (FRC), which was given one year to stabilize the broadcasting situation.

Section 9 of the FRC's enabling act made a general declaration about the need to equitably distribute radio station assignments, stating:

In considering applications for licenses and renewals of licenses, when and in so far as there is a demand for the same, the licensing authority shall make such a distribution of licenses, bands of frequency of wave lengths, periods of time for operation, and of power among the different States and communities as to give fair, efficient, and equitable radio service to each of the same.

— An Act for the regulation of radio communications, approved February 23, 1927 (section 9)

The FRC was unable to finalize its plans within its one-year deadline, so in March 1928 the U.S. Congress extended its authorization until March 16, 1929. Proposed as a part of the reauthorization was an amendment, authored by Ewin L. Davis, a Democratic member of the House of Representatives from Tennessee, which specified in more detail the standards to be followed to ensure an "equitable allocation" of stations:

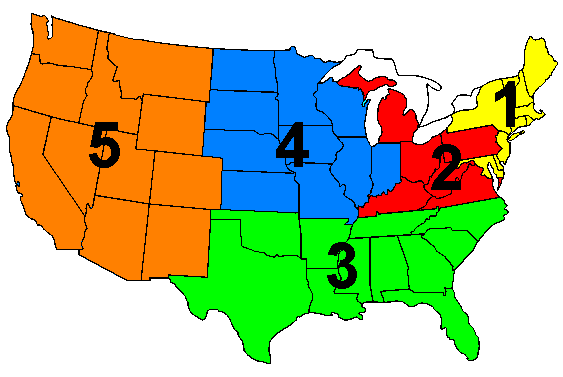
The five U.S. zones among which stations were to be equally allocated under the provisions of the Davis Amendment. The territories of Puerto Rico and the Virgin Islands were included in Zone 1, and Hawaii and Alaska in Zone 5.

SEC. 5. The second paragraph of section 9 of the Radio Act of 1927 is amended to read as follows:
"It is hereby declared that the people of all the zones established by section 2 of this Act are entitled to equality of radio broadcasting service, both of transmission and of reception, and in order to provide said equality the licensing authority shall as nearly as possible make and maintain an equal allocation of broadcasting licenses, of bands of frequency or wave lengths, of periods of time for operation, and of station power, to each of said zones when and in so far as there are applications therefor; and shall make a fair and equitable allocation of licenses, wave lengths, time for operation, and station power to each of the States, the District of Columbia, the Territories and possessions of the United States within each zone, according to population. The licensing authority shall carry into effect the equality of broadcasting service hereinbefore directed, whenever necessary or proper, by granting or refusing licenses or renewals of licenses, by changing periods of time for operation, and by increasing or decreasing station power, when applications are made for licenses or renewals of licenses: Provided, That if and when there is a lack of applications from any zone for the proportionate share of licenses, wave lengths, time of operation, or station power to which such zone is entitled, the licensing authority may issue licenses for the balance of the proportion not applied for from any zone, to applicants from other zones for a temporary period of ninety days each, and shall specifically designate that said apportionment is only for said temporary period. Allocations shall be charged to the State, District, Territory, or possession wherein the studio of the station is located and not where the transmitter is located."

— An Act Continuing for one year the powers and authority of the Federal Radio Commission under the Radio Act of 1927, approved March 28, 1928, page 2.

Davis' proposal was somewhat controversial. Support and opposition crossed party lines, and it was more likely to be favored in rural areas and the less developed south and west, while urban areas and the northeast and midwest, where most of the existing major radio stations were located, were more likely to oppose the measure. Despite strong opposition from the National Association of Broadcasters and the largest radio firms, the Davis Amendment rider was included as part of the FRC reauthorization.

== Implementation ==
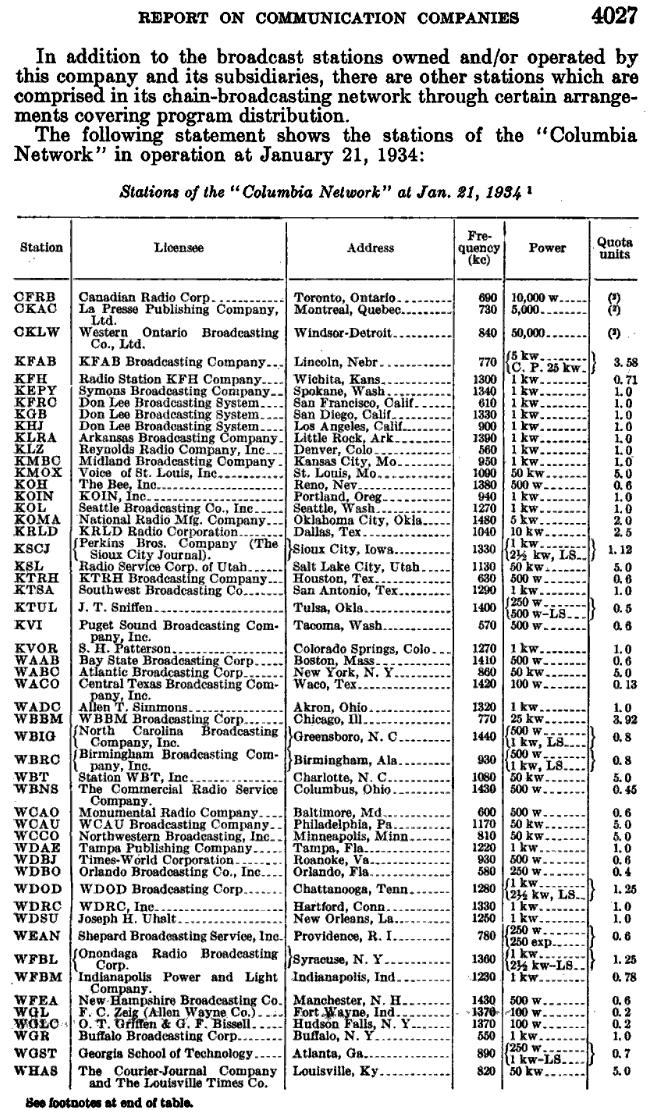
Partial list of CBS network affiliates, including their Davis Amendment "quota units" (1934)

On November 11, 1928, the FRC put into effect a major reallocation of U.S. radio stations, under the provisions of its General Order 40. This reallocation partially met the requirements of the Davis Amendment, most notably by assigning eight clear channel frequencies to each of the five radio zones. However, there was still a need to quantify and reassign stations in order to more fully meet the Davis Amendment standards.

On June 17, 1930 the FRC released General Order No. 92, "Broadcasting stations classified according to values (units) for allocation equality between the five radio zones", which specified how "quota units" would be determined for evaluating an individual station's impact on state and zone quota allocations. Stations were assigned unit values of up to 5 points each, which was primarily determined by their transmitting power and hours of operation.

By late 1933, the FRC had adopted a policy that the national quota target would be 400 units, with 80 units assigned to each zone. Quota units assigned to individual stations ranged from 0.01 to 5. At this time the Commission reported difficulty in achieving balance within both the zone and individual state assignments. It reported that Zones 1 and 2 were currently under quota, while the other three were over. Some individual states were highly above or below their allocations, with the extremes of Florida at 107% over quota, and Wyoming at 59% under quota.

The effort to achieve equalization among zones and between states led to a number of reassignments and legal battles. In 1934 KYW, operating on a clear channel frequency assigned to Zone 2, but located in the Zone 4 city of Chicago, Illinois, was compelled to move to Philadelphia, Pennsylvania to conform to the zone requirements. Using the Davis Amendment standard as a justification, WJKS in Gary, Indiana petitioned the FRC to eliminate two stations located in Chicago, WIBO and WPCC, that were timesharing on 560 kHz, so that it could begin operating full-time on their cleared frequency. A major argument in favor of WJKS was that the "State of Indiana is 2.08 units or 22 per cent under-quota in station assignments and the State of Illinois is 12.49 units or 55 per cent over-quota". In 1933 the Supreme Court sided with the FRC's approval of the WJKS request, and WIBO and WPCC were deleted and replaced by WJKS. (Shortly thereafter WJKS changed its call letters to WIND, and a few years later, after the Davis Amendment had been repealed, moved from Gary to Chicago.)

The Communications Act of 1934, which replaced the FRC with the Federal Communications Commission (FCC), incorporated the Davis Amendment requirements in its Section 307(b), with one additional proviso:

Provided further, That the Commission may also grant applications for additional licenses for stations not exceeding one hundred watts of power if the Commission finds that such stations will serve the public convenience, interest, or necessity, and that their operation will not interfere with the fair and efficient radio service of stations licensed under the provisions of this section.

— Communications Act of 1934, approved June 19, 1934, page 21.

However, even with this change the FCC struggled with implementing the Davis Amendment equalization requirements, and worked for its repeal.

== Repeal ==
Reflecting the opposition to the Davis Amendment by members of the FCC, Senator Burton K. Wheeler, head of the Committee on Interstate Commerce, reported that "on May 23, 1935, the Chairman of the Federal Communications Commission wrote the chairman of your committee as follows":

The existing law, which S. 2243 seeks to repeal, is contrary to natural laws and has resulted in the concentration of the use of frequencies in centers of population, and the restriction of facilities in sparsely populated States, even though interference consideration would permit the operation of one or more additional stations. Because of the size of the zones provided for by existing law, the distribution required by the Davis Amendment has resulted in providing ample broadcast service in small zones and lack of service in large zones. The experience of the Federal Radio Commission and this Commission has proved that the Davis Amendment is very difficult of administration and cannot result in an equality of radio broadcasting service.

— Allocation of Radio Facilities 74th Congress, 2d Session, House of Representatives Report No. 2589, page 3.

Conforming to the wishes of the FCC, the U.S. Congress repealed the Davis Amendment on June 5, 1936. Although this allowed a modest increase in the number of radio stations, it did not lead to wholesale changes in the structure of the AM broadcast band, as most of its organization remained unchanged from what had been created while following the Davis Amendment requirements.
