= Radio Act of 1927 =

Former United States radio law from 1927 to 1934

- Other short titles: Dill-White Act
- Long title: An Act For the regulation of radio communications, and for other purposes.
- Enacted by: the 69th United States Congress
- Effective: February 23, 1927

Citations
- Public law: Public Law 69-632
- Statutes at Large: 44 Stat. 1162

Codification
- Acts repealed: Radio Act of 1912

Legislative history
- Introduced in the House as H.R. 9971 by R‑ME Wallace H. White Jr.th on March 3, 1926; Committee consideration by House Committee on Merchant Marine and Fisheries; Passed the House on March 15, 1926 (Voice vote); Passed the Senate on July 2, 1926 (Voice vote); Reported by the joint conference committee on January–February 1927; agreed to by the House on January 29, 1927 (Voice vote (agreed to conference report)) and by the Senate on February 18, 1927 (Voice vote (agreed to conference report)); Signed into law by President Calvin Coolidge on February 23, 1927

Major amendments
- Davis Amendment (1928)

The Radio Act of 1927 (United States Public Law 632, 69th Congress) was signed into law on February 23, 1927. It replaced the Radio Act of 1912, increasing the federal government's regulatory powers over radio communication, with oversight vested in a newly created body, the Federal Radio Commission. It also was the first legislation to mandate that stations had to show they were "in the public interest, convenience, or necessity" in order to receive a license. The Act was later replaced by the Communications Act of 1934.

== Previous regulation ==
Although radio communication (originally known as "wireless telegraphy") was developed in the late 1890s, it was largely unregulated in the United States until the passage of the Radio Act of 1912, which placed licensing authority under the Department of Commerce. However, a pair of successful legal cases challenging the federal government's powers under the 1912 Act led to its eventual replacement.

In 1921 the Commerce Department had tried to refuse to issue a renewal license to a point-to-point radiotelegraph station in New York City, operated by the Intercity Radio Company. Intercity appealed, and in 1923 the Court of Appeals of the District of Columbia sided with Intercity, stating the 1912 Act did not provide for licensing decisions at "the discretion of an executive officer". Commerce planned to request a review by the Supreme Court, but the case was rendered moot when Intercity decided to shut down the New York City station.

A second challenge occurred when the Zenith Radio Corporation's high-powered radio station, WJAZ in Chicago, in early January 1926 began transmitting on an unassigned frequency, invoking the Intercity Radio Company case rulings to claim the federal government had no legal authority to specify operating requirements. On April 16, 1926, Judge James H. Wilkerson ruled in Zenith's favor, and a July 8, 1926 review of the case by Acting Attorney General William J. Donovan concluded that: "the present legislation is inadequate to cover the art of broadcasting, which has been almost entirely developed since the passage of the 1912 Act. If the present situation requires control, I can only suggest that it be sought in new legislation, carefully adapted to meet the needs of both the present and the future."

== Radio Act of 1927 ==
To rectify the matter, Congress passed the Radio Act of 1927, which was signed into law by President Calvin Coolidge on February 23, 1927. The Act strengthened the federal government's authority "to regulate all forms of interstate and foreign radio transmissions and communications within the United States, its Territories and possessions", and adopted a standard that radio stations had to be shown to be "in the public interest, convenience, or necessity".

There was an initial emphasis on reorganizing the broadcasting service, which had grown to 732 stations. While only 1 percent of U.S. households owned at least one radio receiver in 1923, a majority would by 1931. The legislation created a five member Federal Radio Commission to provide oversight, with a commissioner appointed from each of five regional districts. The original law envisioned that after one year most of the Commission's work would be completed, after which "all the powers and authority vested in the commission under the terms of this Act, except as to the revocation of licenses, shall be vested in and exercised by the Secretary of Commerce; except that thereafter the commission shall have power and jurisdiction to act upon and determine any and all matters brought before it under the terms of this section".

However, after a year it became clear that the commissioners needed more time, and in March 1928 their mandate was extended by a year. This reauthorization included a provision, known as the "Davis Amendment" after its sponsor Representative Ewin L. Davis (D-Tennessee), that required "a fair and equitable allocation of licenses, wave lengths, time for operation, and station power to each of the States, the District of Columbia, the Territories and possessions of the United States within each zone, according to population". In December 1929 the commission's mandate was extended indefinitely.

== Replacement by the Federal Communications Commission ==
The Communications Act of 1934 abolished the Federal Radio Commission and transferred jurisdiction over radio licensing to the new Federal Communications Commission (FCC). Title III of the Communications Act contained provisions very similar to the Radio Act of 1927, and the FCC largely took over the operations and precedents of the FRC. The law also transferred jurisdiction over communications common carriers, such as telephone and telegraph companies, from the Interstate Commerce Commission to the FCC.
