= List of three-letter broadcast call signs in the United States =

This is a list of radio and television broadcasting stations in the United States that are currently assigned three-letter call signs.

== Overview ==
In the United States, all radio and television broadcasting stations that are licensed by the Federal Communications Commission (FCC) are assigned official, unique call signs. Organized broadcasting began in the U.S. in the early 1920s on the AM band — FM and television did not exist yet. Initially most broadcasting stations were assigned three-letter calls; however, a switch was made in April 1922 to primarily four-letter calls, after the number of stations had increased into the hundreds. For a few years thereafter, a small number of new three-letter calls continued to be issued. Although most of the original three-letter calls were randomly assigned, these later calls were often specially requested to match station slogans. The last new three-letter call was assigned to station WIS ("Wonderful Iodine State", now WVOC) in Columbia, South Carolina, on January 23, 1930. Since then, three-letter calls have only been assigned to stations, including FM (beginning in 1943) and TV (beginning in 1946), which are historically related to an AM station that was originally issued that call sign. (FCC rules also permitted analog Low Power TV stations to receive three letter calls, with -CA or -LP suffixes, although there is no record that this ever happened.)

This review only includes FCC-licensed stations. Not included are unlicensed operations, such as carrier current, cable TV, and Internet stations — for example, San Diego State University's "KCR" — which have adopted call-letter-like identifiers that are not officially issued by the FCC. Also not included are stations which use, as slogans, three-letter truncations of their official four-letter call signs; for example, the full call sign for radio station "KOH" in Reno, Nevada, is actually KKOH, and "WTN" in Nashville, Tennessee, is actually WWTN.

Examples of stations which formerly had three letter call signs, but have since changed (such as Albuquerque, New Mexico's KKOB, formerly KOB) are reviewed in separate sections below the main list.

== Current assignments ==
As of July 7, 2026, a total of 103 AM, FM and TV stations in the United States were assigned three-letter call signs. This is divided among only 68 different three-letter calls. This is because, in many cases, the same "base" call sign is used by more than one station; however, a given call sign is never assigned to more than one AM, FM or TV station. These 68 different "base" three-letter call signs are currently grouped as follows:

- 25 AM-only
- 8 FM-only
- 7 TV-only
- 14 AM/FM
- 7 AM/TV
- 7 AM/FM/TV

Listed below are all the assignments as of July 7, 2026.

- All three-letter call signs originated with an AM-band station in the period 1921 to 1930. In some cases, this station subsequently changed to a different call sign. In these cases, the original station, and its latest call sign, is listed in parentheses
- In cases where an AM station exists with the same "base" call letters as an FM station, the FM station is required to include an "-FM" suffix as part of its call sign. If no AM station is currently using the same base call sign, then the "-FM" suffix is optional.
- As with FM stations, if an AM station currently exists with the same "base" call, a TV station must include a suffix to differentiate itself, but this suffix is optional if no AM station currently exists. TV stations may select either "-TV" or "-DT" as their suffix.

Call sign	Current AM band - 53 stations (Original stations in parentheses)	Current FM band - 29 stations	Current TV band - 21 stations
KDB	(kosj: 1/9/1929-9/8/1990)	KDB - Santa Barbara, California	
KEX	KEX - Portland, Oregon; 12/23/1926+		
KFH	KFH - Wichita, Kansas; 8/30/2004+ (knss: 12/--/1925-8/30/2004)		
KFI	KFI - Los Angeles, California; 3/31/1922+		
KGA	KGA - Spokane, Washington; 2/4/1927+		
KGB	KGB - San Diego, California; 7/4/2020+ (klsd: 3/27/1928-3/15/1982)	KGB-FM - San Diego, California	
KGO	(ksfo: 1/22/1924-1/1/2025)		KGO-TV - San Francisco, California
KGU	KGU - Honolulu, Hawaii; 3/14/1922+	KGU-FM - Honolulu, Hawaii	
KGW	(kpoj: 3/21/1922-3/1/1993)		KGW - Portland, Oregon
KHJ	KHJ - Los Angeles, California; 3/18/1922-2/1/1986, 3/15/2000+		
KHQ	(kqnt: 2/28/1922-1/7/1985)		KHQ-TV - Spokane, Washington
KIT	KIT - Yakima, Washington; 3/22/1929+		
KJR	KJR - Seattle, Washington; 3/9/1922+	KJR-FM - Seattle, Washington	
KLO	(kmes: 4/11/1929-11/3/2020)	KLO-FM - Coalville, Utah	
KLZ	KLZ - Denver, Colorado; 3/10/1922+		
KMA	KMA - Shenandoah, Iowa; 8/12/1925+	KMA-FM - Clarinda, Iowa	
KMJ	KMJ - Fresno, California; 3/23/1922+	KMJ-FM - Fresno, California	
KNX	KNX - Los Angeles, California; 5/4/1922+	KNX-FM - Los Angeles, California	
KOA	KOA - Denver, Colorado; 12/13/1924+		
KOB	(kkob: 4/5/1922-10/28/1986)		KOB - Albuquerque, New Mexico
KOY	KOY - Phoenix, Arizona; 5/7/1999+ (kfyi 2/8/1929 - 5/7/1999)		
KPQ	KPQ - Wenatchee, Washington; 5/2/1928+	KPQ-FM - Wenatchee, Washington	
KQV	KQV - Pittsburgh, Pennsylvania; 1/9/1922+		
KSD	(ktrs: 3/14/1922-3/10/1997)	KSD - St. Louis, Missouri	
KSL	KSL - Salt Lake City, Utah; 3/24/1925+	KSL-FM - Midvale, Utah	KSL-TV - Salt Lake City, Utah
KUJ	KUJ - Walla Walla, Washington; 12/--/1926+	KUJ-FM - Burbank, Washington	
KUT	(ktrh: 10/30/1925-1/26/1932)	KUT - Austin, Texas	
KVI	KVI - Seattle, Washington; 11/24/1926+		
KWG	KWG - Stockton, California; 12/7/1921+		
KXL	(kxtg: 11/27/1926-6/1/2011)	KXL-FM - Portland, Oregon	
KXO	KXO - El Centro, California; 11/11/1928+	KXO-FM - El Centro, California	
KYW	KYW - Philadelphia, Pennsylvania; 11/15/1921+		KYW-TV - Philadelphia, Pennsylvania
WBT	WBT - Charlotte, North Carolina; 3/18/1922+	WBT-FM - Charlotte, North Carolina	
WBZ	WBZ - Boston, Massachusetts; 9/15/1921+	WBZ-FM - Boston, Massachusetts	WBZ-TV - Boston, Massachusetts
WDZ	WDZ - Decatur, Illinois; 4/5/1922+		
WEW	WEW - Saint Louis, Missouri; 3/23/1922+		
WGH	WGH - Newport News, Virginia; 11/20/1928-8/31/1983, 12/10/1984-12/5/2004, 7/1/2005+	WGH-FM - Newport News, Virginia	
WGL	WGL - Fort Wayne, Indiana; 11/11/1928+		
WGN	WGN - Chicago, Illinois; 3/29/1924+ (webh: 3/--/1924-3/28/1924)		WGN-TV - Chicago, Illinois
WGR	WGR - Buffalo, New York; 3/14/1922+	WGR-FM - Wethersfield, New York	
WGY	WGY - Schenectady, New York; 2/4/1922+	WGY-FM - Albany, New York	
WHA	WHA - Madison, Wisconsin; 1/13/1922+		WHA-TV - Madison, Wisconsin
WHB	WHB - Kansas City, Missouri; 10/7/1997+ (kcmo: 5/10/1922-10/7/1997)		
WHK	WHK - Cleveland, Ohio; 2/21/1922-2/26/2001, 4/5/2005+		
WHO	WHO - Des Moines, Iowa; 4/15/1924+		WHO-DT - Des Moines, Iowa
WHP	WHP - Harrisburg, Pennsylvania; 3/16/1929+		WHP-TV - Harrisburg, Pennsylvania
WIL	(kzqz: 1/--/1925-3/5/2008)	WIL-FM - Saint Louis, Missouri	
WIP	(wtel: 3/20/1922-12/1/2014)	WIP-FM - Philadelphia, Pennsylvania	
WIS	(wvoc: 1/23/1930-12/31/1986)		WIS - Columbia, South Carolina
WJR	WJR - Detroit, Michigan; 8/20/1925+		
WJW	(wknr: 5/9/1929-6/11/1985)		WJW - Cleveland, Ohio
WJZ	WJZ - Baltimore, Maryland; 11/3/2008+ (wabc: 5/--/1921-3/1/1953)	WJZ-FM - Catonsville, Maryland	WJZ-TV - Baltimore, Maryland
WKY	WKY - Oklahoma City, Oklahoma; 3/16/1922+		
WLS	WLS - Chicago, Illinois; 4/11/1924+	WLS-FM - Chicago, Illinois	WLS-TV - Chicago, Illinois
WLW	WLW - Cincinnati, Ohio; 3/2/1922+		
WMC	WMC - Memphis, Tennessee; 1/19/1923+		WMC-TV - Memphis, Tennessee
WMT	WMT - Cedar Rapids, Iowa; 11/11/1928+		
WOC	WOC - Davenport, Iowa; 11/11/1934+ (woc/woc-who: 2/18/1922-11/11/1934)		
WOI	WOI - Ames, Iowa; 4/28/1922+	WOI-FM - Ames, Iowa	WOI-DT - Ames, Iowa
WOL	WOL - Washington, D.C. 2/20/1950+ (wqof: 11/11/1928-2/20/1950)		
WOR	WOR - New York, New York; 2/20/1922+		
WOW	WOW - Omaha, Nebraska; 12/16/1926-11/22/1999, 7/7/2026+		
WRC	(wtem: 6/28/1923-2/27/1984)		WRC-TV - Washington, D.C.
WRR	(ktck: 3/13/1922-4/14/1978)	WRR - Dallas, Texas	
WSB	WSB - Atlanta, Georgia; 3/15/1922+	WSB-FM - Atlanta, Georgia	WSB-TV - Atlanta, Georgia
WSM	WSM - Nashville, Tennessee; 10/5/1925+	WSM-FM - Nashville, Tennessee	
WWJ	WWJ - Detroit, Michigan; 3/3/1922+		WWJ-TV - Detroit, Michigan
WWL	WWL - New Orleans, Louisiana; 3/30/1922+	WWL-FM - Kenner, Louisiana	WWL-TV - New Orleans, Louisiana

== Former usage ==
In all cases, a given three-letter call sign originated with an AM band station. However, the later development of FM and TV stations saw many adopting a version of the well established AM station's call sign. This was particularly true of FM radio stations, which commonly simulcast an AM station before adopting their own formats and distinctive call letters. Below are partial lists of previous usage:

=== Former AM station assignments ===
- KDN - San Francisco, California, 1921-1923 (deleted)
- KFC - Seattle, Washington, 1921-1924 (deleted)
- KGB - San Francisco, California, 1921-1922 (deleted)
- KGB - Los Angeles, California, 1928-1982 (became KCNN)
- KGC - Los Angeles, California, 1921-1922 (became KNX)
- KGG - Portland, Oregon, 1922-1924 (deleted)
- KGY - Olympia, Washington, 1922-2014 (became KBUP)
- KID - Idaho Falls, Idaho, 1929-2023 (deleted)
- KJJ - Sunnyvale, California, 1921-1923 (deleted)
- KJQ - Stockton, California, 1921-1925 (deleted)
- KLS - Oakland, California, 1922-1945 (became KWBR)
- KLX - Oakland, California, 1922-1959 (became KEWB)
- KMO - Tacoma Washington, 1922-1983 (changed to KAMT)
- KOG - Los Angeles, California, 1921-1923 (deleted)
- KOH - Reno, Nevada, 1928-1994 (became KRCV)
- KOL - Seattle, Washington, 1928-1975 (became KMPS)
- KOP - Detroit, Michigan, 1922-1925 (deleted)
- KPO - San Francisco, California, 1922-1946 (became KNBC)
- KQW - San Francisco, California, 1921-1949 (became KCBS)
- KRE - Berkeley, California, 1922-1963 and 1972-1986 (became KBLX)
- KSO - Des Moines, Iowa, 1935-1989 (became KGGO)
- KTM - Los Angeles, California, 1928-1935 (became KEHE)
- KTW - Seattle, Washington, 1922-1975 (became KYAC)
- KVL - Seattle, Washington, 1928-1936 (became KEEN)
- KVQ - Sacramento, California, 1921-1923 (deleted)
- KWK - Saint Louis, Missouri, 1927-1984 (became KGLD)
- KYA - San Francisco, California, 1926-1983 (became KOIT)
- KYJ - Los Angeles, California, 1921-1923 (deleted)
- KYY - San Francisco, California, 1921-1923 (deleted)
- KZC - Los Angeles, California, 1921-1922 (changed to KOG)
- KZM - Oakland, California, 1921-1931 (deleted, Hayward, California)
- KZY - Oakland, California, 1921-1923 (deleted)
- WBL - Detroit, Michigan, 1921-1922 (changed to WWJ)
- WDM - Washington, D. C., 1921-1925 (deleted)
- WDT - New York, New York, 1921-1923 (deleted)
- WDW - Washington, D.C., 1921-1922 (deleted)
- WEY - Wichita, Kansas, 1922-1923 (deleted)
- WFI - Philadelphia, Pennsylvania, 1922-1935 (consolidated with WLIT as WFIL)
- WGF - Des Moines, Iowa, 1922-1923 (deleted)
- WGH - Montgomery, Alabama, 1922-1923 (deleted)
- WGL - New York, New York, 1926-1928 (became WOV)
- WGM - Atlanta, Georgia, 1922-1923 (deleted)
- WGU - Chicago, Illinois - 1922 (relicensed as WMAQ)
- WGV - New Orleans, Louisiana, 1922-1924 (deleted)
- WHD - Morgantown, West Virginia, 1922-1923 (deleted)
- WHN - New York, New York, 1922-1948 and 1962-1987 (became WFAN)
- WJH - Washington, D. C., 1921-1924 (deleted)
- WJX - New York City, 1921-1924 (deleted)
- WJY - New York, New York, 1923-1927 (deleted)
- WKC- Baltimore, Maryland, 1922-1923 (deleted)
- WKN - Memphis, Tennessee, 1922-1923 (deleted)
- WLB - Minneapolis, Minnesota, 1922-1945 (became KUOM)
- WLK - Indianapolis, Indiana, 1922-1923 (deleted)
- WMB - Auburn, Maine, 1922-1923 (deleted)
- WMH - Cincinnati, Ohio, 1921-1923 (deleted)
- WMH - Cincinnati, Ohio, 1924-1925 (became WKRC)
- WOK - Chicago, Illinois, 1925-1928 (deleted as WMBB-WOK)
- WOO - Philadelphia, Pennsylvania, 1922-1928 (deleted)
- WOQ - Kansas City, Missouri, 1922-1934 (deleted)
- WOS - Jefferson City, Missouri, 1922-1936 (deleted)
- WOU - Omaha, Nebraska, 1921-1923 (deleted)
- WOV - New York, New York, 1928-1959 (became WADO)
- WPO - Memphis, Tennessee, 1922-1923 (deleted)
- WRM - Urbana, Illinois, 1922-1928 (became WILL)
- WWT - Buffalo, New York, 1922 (deleted)

=== Former FM station assignments ===
- KFI-FM - 1946-1951 (deleted)
- WDVE - KQV-FM, 1962-1970

=== Former TV station assignments ===
- KMGH-TV - KLZ-TV, 1953-1972
- KSEE - KMJ-TV, 1953-1981
- KCPQ - KMO-TV, 1953-1954
- KCNC-TV - KOA-TV, 1953-1983
- KSDK - KSD-TV, 1947-1979
- KMOV - KWK-TV, 1954-1958
- WBTV - WBT-TV, 1948-1949
- KFOR-TV - WKY-TV, 1949-1976
- KGAN - WMT-TV, 1953-1981
- KWQC - WOC-TV, 1949-1986
- WGRZ - WGR-TV, 1954–1983
- WWOR-TV - WOR-TV, 1949-1987
- WOWT - WOW-TV, 1949-1975
- WSMV-TV - WSM-TV, 1950-1981
- KCAL-TV - KFI-TV, 1948–1951; KHJ-TV, 1951–1989

== Other stations of note ==
- WWV - Fort Collins, Colorado — shortwave time signal data radio clock service operated by the National Institute of Standards and Technology
- KPH - Bolinas, California — shortwave morse code data service operated by radiomarine.org under the auspices of the National Park Service
- NOF - early 1920s station, located in the Anacostia section of Washington, D.C.
- NAA - Arlington, Virginia, station, best known for broadcasting time signals.
- WHD-TV - 1996-1999 Washington, D.C. "model" station, used to develop the digital TV transmission standard.
- WJY - temporary Hoboken, New Jersey, longwave station, which broadcast the July 2, 1921, Dempsey-Carpentier heavyweight boxing match.
- WQB - early 1920s Hartford, Connecticut, station that provided a broadcast service, but was never licensed as a broadcasting station.
- WVP - Army Signal Corps station on Bedloe's Island in New York harbor, which held nightly broadcasts in 1922

== See also ==
- List of local television stations in North and Central America
- Lists of radio stations in North and Central America
