= KXO =

KXO may refer to:

- KXO (AM), a radio station (1230 AM) licensed to El Centro, California, United States
- KXO-FM, a radio station (107.5 FM) licensed to El Centro, California, United States
