= WDM =

WDM may refer to:

== Science and technology ==
- Warm dark matter in cosmology
- Warm dense matter, a state of matter between solid and plasma
- Wavelength-division multiplexing, a signal transmission method
- wdm, the WINGs Display Manager on Unix
- Windows Driver Model, a framework for device drivers in Windows
- Wide Diesel Mixed, a series of Indian locomotives

== Other uses ==
- West Des Moines, Iowa, United States, a city
- Western Development Museum of Saskatchewan
- World Development Movement, a British campaign for social justice
- Waking Down in Mutuality, an American "spiritual awakening" association
- Warith Deen Muhammad (Wallace D. Muhammad), a leader of the Nation of Islam
- WDM (Washington, D.C.), an early 1920s radio station
