= WGV =

WGV, or wgv, may refer to:

- WGV (AM), New Orleans, US (1922–1924)
- Whitbread Golding Variety, of English hops
- World Golf Village, Florida, US
- Wargrave railway station, Berkshire, England (GBR:WGV)

== See also ==
- WGU (disambiguation)
