= WDW =

WDW may refer to:

- Walt Disney World, amusement park complex
- WDW (Washington, D.C.), radio station from 1921 to 1922
- Why Don't We, American pop boy band
- WDW (TV station), a digital television station in Western Australia
