= WGU (disambiguation) =

WGU is Western Governors University, an American online university (founded 1997).

WGU may refer to:

- Weapons-grade uranium, a material
- Women's General Union, Libya (founded 1970)
- Wirangu language, spoken in Australia (ISO 639: wgu)
- WSCR, an American radio station (call sign in 1922: WGU)

== See also ==
- WGV (disambiguation)
- WJU (disambiguation)
