= Leo C. Young =

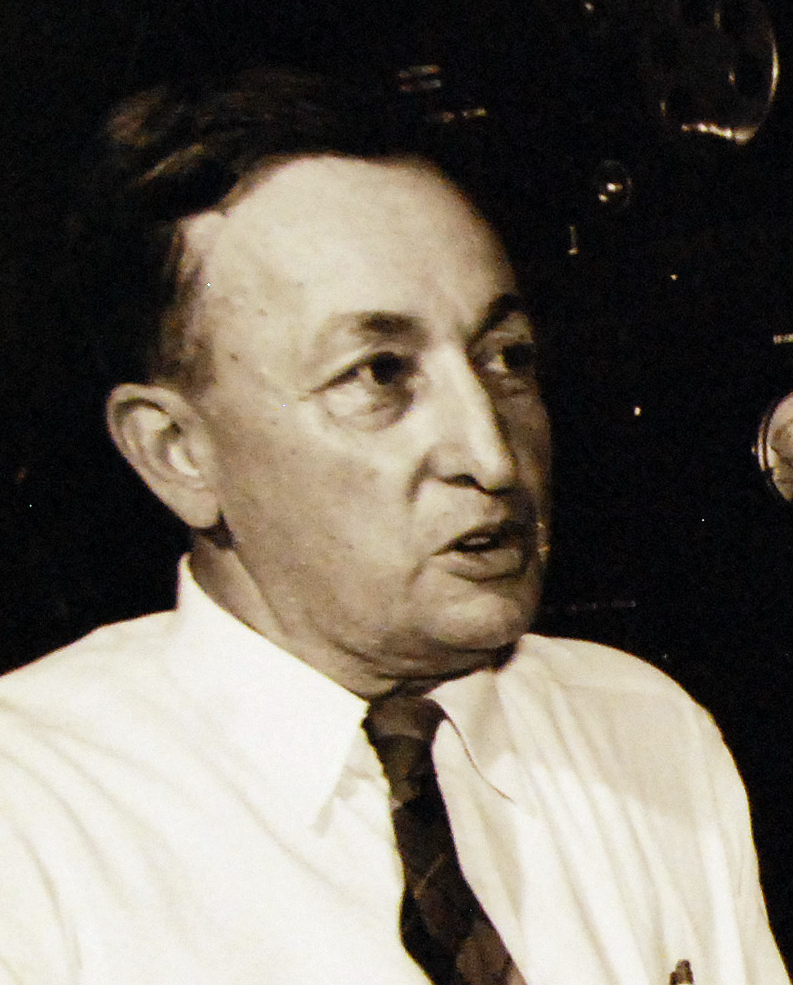
- Born: 12 January 1891; Ohio
- Died: 16 January 1981 (aged 90); Forestville
- Employer: United States Naval Research Laboratory (1923–1961)
- Awards: Stuart Ballantine Medal (1957); Navy Distinguished Civilian Service Award (1958); President's Certificate of Merit (1946)

Leo Crawford Young (12 January 1891 – 16 January 1981) was an American radio engineer who had many accomplishments during a long career at the U.S. Naval Research Laboratory. Although self-educated, he was a member of a small, creative team which some attributed to the developing the world's first true radar system.

== Background and career ==
Leo Young grew up on a farm near Van Wert, Ohio. Although his formal education stopped with high-school, he was self-educated in early radio technology. He built his first crystal radio when he was 14 years old. To receive stations, he learned the Morse code, and soon built his own spark-gap transmitter, joining the ranks of amateur radio enthusiasts in the pre-license days. (Young was later issued the call sign W3WV). After high school, he used his ability with Morse code to gain employment as a railroad telegrapher. In 1913, he joined the Naval Communications Reserves and set up the central control station for the Navy-Amateur Network.

The Navy Reserve was activated at the start of World War I in 1917. Young was assigned to the District Communications Office at Great Lakes, Illinois, where Albert Hoyt Taylor was the Director. Taylor was also an amateur radio operator (call sign 9YN), and he and Young began a personal and professional relationship that existed for the rest of their lives. In 1918, Taylor was sent to the former Marconi Communications Station in Belmar, New Jersey, to head the Navy's Trans-Atlantic Communications System, and then went to the Navy's Aircraft Radio Laboratory (ARL) at Anacostia, Washington, D.C.; Taylor arranged for Young to follow him in both of these assignments. In 1919, both Young and Taylor returned to civilian life, but stayed as employees at the ARL

In 1922, Taylor and Young were making measurements with a transmitter located at the ARL and a receiver on the opposite shore of the Potomac River. A wavering in the strength of the received signal was noted as a wooded ship crossed the signal path. Taylor reported this to higher authorities as a potential method of detecting ships intruding into a formation, but no further tests were authorized.

One of Young's projects of the ARL was in developing amplitude modulation for transmitters, allowing audio communications as an alternate to Morse code. To test the equipment, he began "broadcasting" music and short news items using call letters NSF. By 1922, this expanded to broadcasts from Congress, including an address by President Warren G. Harding. Requests for "air time" began to interfere with the Young's research work, and in early 1923, the broadcasting operation was transferred to Radio Virginia, the Naval Radio Service in Arlington, Virginia.

The Naval Research Laboratory (NRL) was opened in July 1923, at Bellevue in Washington, D.C., close by Anacosia. This absorbed a number of existing Naval research operations, including the ARL. Taylor was named Superintendent of the Radio Division with Young as his assistant. Over the next decade, Young had a major role in most of the early radio developments of the NRL, including their round-the-world high-frequency experiment in 1925, communicating 10,000 miles between Radio Virginia and a U.S. Navy ship in Australia.

Gregory Breit and Merle A. Tuve at the Carnegie Institution of Washington were studying the characteristics of the ionosphere (then called the Kennelly–Heaviside layer) using a transmitter built at the NRL. In attempting to determine the distance to the layer, they asked Young if he could design an appropriate modulation technique. Young suggested using pulse modulation, with the height possibly determined from the lapsed time between transmitted and received pulses. Young built the modulator, and in 1925 Breit and Tuve used this to determine that the height varied between 55 and 130 miles.

In 1930, Lawrence A. Hyland, another member of Taylor's team dating back to Great Lakes, was testing an antenna and observed interference from a passing aircraft. Reminded of the 1922 observation of a similar nature, Taylor and Young submitted a report titled "Radio-Echo Signals from Moving Objects," and again suggested that this might be used for detection purpose. The report slowly made its way through the bureaucracy in Washington, and in early 1932 was forwarded to the Army's Signal Corps Laboratories where it fell on "deaf ears."

Taylor convinced the NRL Director to allow an internally funded low-level project on interference-based detection. Lack of success by early 1934, however, led Young to suggest trying a pulsed transmitter, similar to the one built earlier for Breit and Tuve; this would not only provide a higher peak power but the timing between the transmitted and received pulse could be used to determine the distance to the target.

Robert Morris Page was assigned by Taylor to construct an experimental apparatus to test this concept. Page used a pulsed transmitter to drive an existing antenna atop the main NRL building. A receiver, modified to pass pulsed signals, had its antenna mounted some distance away from the transmitter. Both the transmitted and received signals were displayed on a commercial oscilloscope.

In December 1934, this system successfully detected an aircraft at distances up to one mile as it flew up and down the Potomac River. Although the displayed signal was almost indistinct and the range was small, this was a proof of the basic concept. Based on this, Page, Taylor, and Young are usually credited with building and demonstrating the world's first true radar. (Radar is a name coming from an acronym for RAdio Detection And Ranging. A number of earlier devices, dating back to 1904, had been developed for detecting remote objects, but none of these measured the distance (range) to the target; thus, they were not radar systems.)

With this success, in 1935 funds were officially provided for further research and development of the system. The early proof-of-concept equipment operated at 60 MHz and required an antenna impractically large for shipboard use. For the follow-on system, the frequency was raised to 200 MHz, the limit for transmitter tubes and other components at that time. This allowed the antenna to be greatly reduced in size (antenna size is inversely proportional to the operating frequency).

Young and Page developed another very important component, the duplexer. This device allowed a common antenna to be used for both transmitting and receiving. With other improvements, a full prototype system was first tested at sea in April 1937. Initially designated the XAF, the system was improved and tested, then placed into production as the CXAM radar, the first such system deployed by the U.S. Navy starting in May 1940. (The acronym RADAR was coined by the Navy at that time as a cover for the highly classified work in this new technology.)

Young continued to work at the NRL as a research engineer until his retirement in 1961. Mr. Young died on January 16, 1981, in Forestville, Maryland.

== Recognitions ==
Leo C. Young's many honors associated with the Naval Research Laboratory included

- The Presidential Certificate of Merit from President Harry S. Truman in 1946, and
- The Navy Department's Distinguished Civilian Service Award in 1958.

In recognition of Young's contributions to the field of radio, he received

- The Stuart Ballantine Medal of the Franklin Institute in 1957, and
- A 50-year gold certificate from the Quarter-Century Wireless Association in 1966.
