= WJH =

Radio station in Washington, D.C. (1921–1924)

WJH was an AM radio station in Washington, D.C., which was first authorized in December 1921, and went off the air in mid-1924. It was originally licensed to the White & Boyer Company, which later became the William P. Boyer Company. WJH was the first radio station licensed in Washington, D.C. following the Department of Commerce's establishment of formal qualifications for broadcasting stations.

== History ==
Beginning in late 1912, radio communication in the United States was regulated by the Department of Commerce. Initially there were no formal standards for which stations could make broadcasts intended for the general public, and after World War I stations under a variety of license classes, most commonly Amateur and Experimental, began making regularly scheduled programs on a limited basis.

In the Washington metropolitan area a number of U.S. government-operated stations also experimented with broadcasting technology. The Navy's high-powered NAA in Arlington, Virginia, began making time signal broadcasts (in Morse Code) beginning in 1913. The Bureau of Standards was particularly active, and in May 1920 its Radio Laboratory station, WWV, was reported to be conducting weekly Friday evening concerts. In late 1920, a second Navy station, NOF, located in the Anacostia section of Washington, D.C., began to include music with its test transmissions, and on January 7, 1921, a live concert was heard as far away as Canada and Cuba. The Post Office Department was also involved, and on April 15, 1921, its WWX was one of four stations that began broadcasting daily market news reports.

At least three Washington, D.C. companies made early broadcasts while operating under amateur station authorizations. The Continental Electric Company later claimed that its station, 3SV, (Note: The "3" in 3SV's call sign indicated that the station was located in the third Radio Inspection district. The fact that the first letter, "S", fell in the range A-W meant that the station was operating under a standard Amateur license.) had been the first. The Radio Construction Company also made early broadcasts over a standard amateur station, 3BAX, and the June 1, 1921 issue of the Washington Herald reported that "Station 3BAX, manned by W. G. Eldridge has just begun to send out concerts every Monday, Wednesday and Saturday evenings, beginning at 7:30 o'clock." (Continental later operated broadcast station WIL from 1922 to 1924, while the Radio Construction Co. received a single thirty-day authorization for WDW in December 1921).

The White & Boyer Co., located at 812 13th Street, N.W., also made early broadcasts over an amateur station, 3NR, and on December 3, 1921, the company ran an advertisement which stated that "We transmit music from our own station on Tuesday and Friday evenings of each week from 7:30 to 9:45."

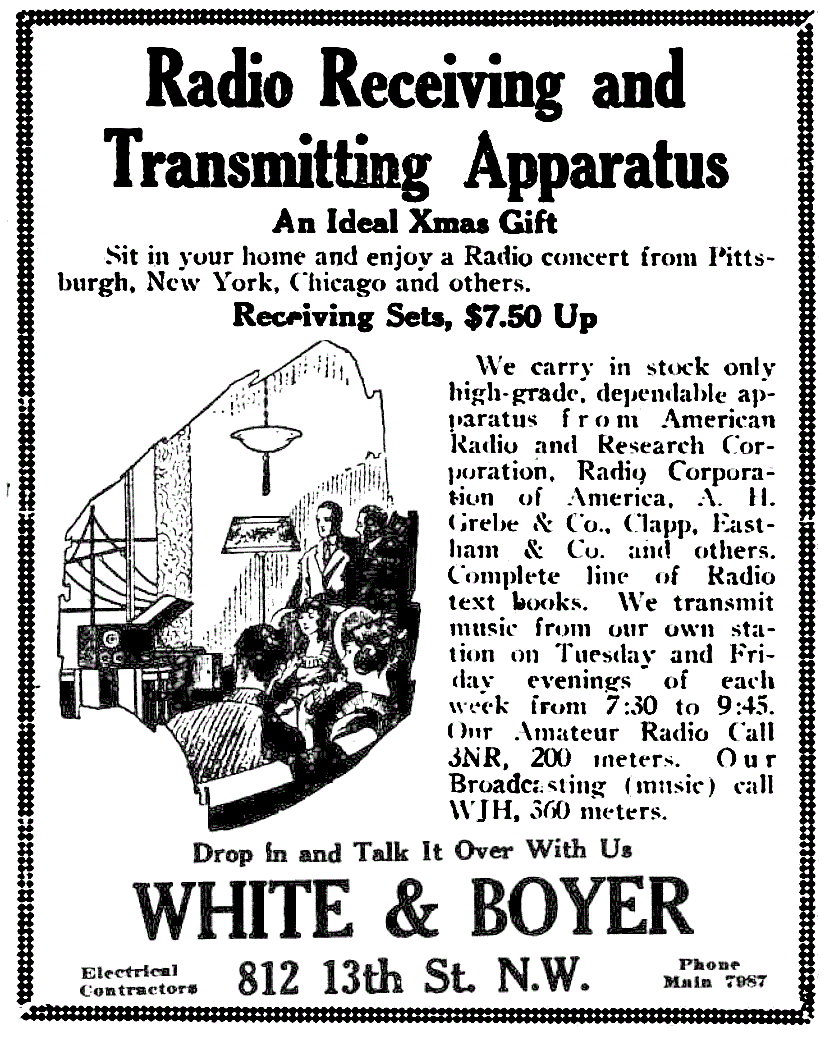
White & Boyer Company advertisement (December 1921) references both amateur station 3NR and recently granted broadcasting station WJH.

Responding to growing broadcasting activity on a national scale, the Department of Commerce adopted regulations effective December 1, 1921, to formally establish a broadcast service category, which set aside the wavelength of 360 meters (833 kHz) for "entertainment" broadcasting, and 485 meters (619 kHz) for "market and weather reports". On December 8, 1921, the White & Boyer Company was issued a broadcasting station license, with the randomly assigned call letters of WJH, for operation on 360 meters. This was the first broadcasting station authorization issued for Washington, D.C. under the new regulations.

3NR and WJH were essentially the same station, with White & Boyer holding both amateur and broadcasting station licenses that specified separate conditions and transmitting frequencies for the two authorizations. The station had an early reputation for high quality audio, and in late 1921 was described as "3NR—The fone with the perfect grid modulation". A few months later a reviewer stated that "I am going on record as saying that I have so far heard but two fones, namely KDKA and 3NR, that were not open to material improvement in modulation quality."

In May, WJH sponsored what was promoted as the first debate to be broadcast by a radio station. The topic was whether or not to adopt Daylight Saving Time, and the participants were two members of the Miller Debating Society, Calvin I. Kephart (pro) and Thomas E. Rhodes (anti). The debate was not formally judged, but did gain national attention for the station.

In mid-1922, Charles Feland Gannon was reported to be WJH's director, with Henry H. Lyon its operator. Lyon was also one of the nominees for the American Radio Relay League's 1922 Smith cup, in recognition of "operating skill and station performance as evidenced by the concerts sent from station WJH, formerly 3NR".

Initially all broadcasting stations transmitted on a single "entertainment" wavelength of 360 meters, which required regional time-sharing agreements. By late 1922, there were numerous stations in the Washington area sharing this wavelength, and a major dispute developed between WJH and a second station, WDM, operated by The Church of the Covenant at 18th and N Streets, N.W. WDM also operated on 360 meters and had regularly broadcast the 8:00 p.m. Sunday services of Reverend Charles Wood. However, on December 3, 1922, WJH began simultaneously broadcasting the Reverend Earle Wilfrey's service from the Vermont Avenue Christian Church, drowning out both stations for most listeners. The simultaneous transmissions were repeated on the evening of December 10, and the clashing signals began to gain national attention.

The Department of Commerce regulated U.S. radio at this time, and then-Secretary Herbert Hoover was asked to intervene in the dispute, but refused to become involved. The technology for keeping stations on their assigned frequencies was rudimentary at this time, and Rev. Wilfrey claimed that, either by purposeful adjustments or due to natural technical variations, the two stations, while nominally transmitting on the same frequency, were actually separated enough so that only the most unskilled listeners using primitive receivers were reporting problems. (Note: Due to the limited technology for maintaining steady transmitting frequencies at this time, a contemporary account noted that "stations were scattered a little below and over 360 meters".) However, this did not resolve the issue, and despite talks between the two ministers, the two stations continued to schedule their conflicting 8:00 p.m. broadcasts until the middle of May. At this time the Commerce Department greatly expanded the number of available transmitting frequencies, and, as part of the implementation of the new policy, on May 15, 1923, WJH was reassigned to an exclusive wavelength of 273 meters (1100 kHz).

In August 1923, William P. Boyer purchased the White & Boyer Company, while reassuring listeners that WJH would continue to operate. However, early the next year it was announced that the station had ceased operations, and WJH was formally deleted on March 26, 1924. The stated cause for closing the station was the pending expense resulting from an industry-wide demand by the American Telephone & Telegraph Company (AT&T) that stations had to pay for the right to use certain important radio equipment patents that it held. As a consequence, AT&T had recently started legal proceeding, beginning with a widely publicized suit against station WHN in New York City.

== See also ==
- List of initial AM-band station grants in the United States
