= Robert Morris Page =

American physicist

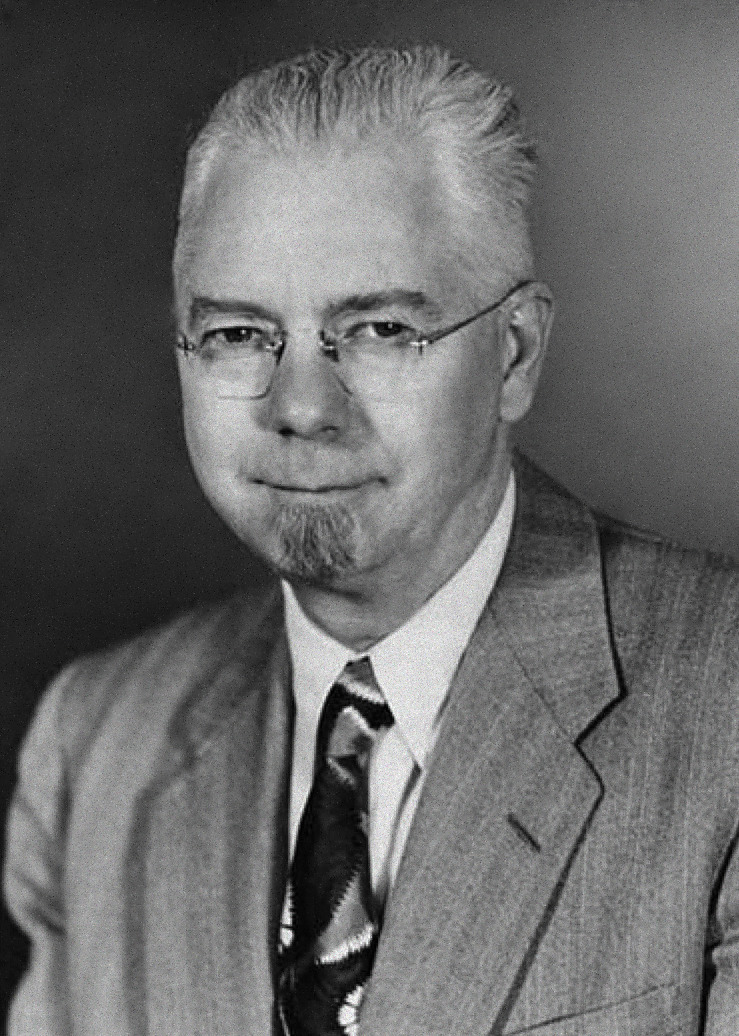
- Born: 2 June 1903; Saint Paul
- Died: 15 May 1992; Edina
- Education: George Washington University, Hamline University
- Occupation: Physicist
- Employer: United States Naval Research Laboratory
- Awards: Stuart Ballantine Medal (1957); Certificate of Merit Medal (1946); President's Award for Distinguished Federal Civilian Service (1960)

Robert Morris Page (2 June 1903 – 15 May 1992) was an American physicist who was a leading figure in the development of radar technology. Later, Page served as the director of research for the U.S. Naval Research Laboratory.

== Life and career ==
Page was born in Saint Paul, Minnesota, the son of a Methodist minister. He attended Hamline University, a small Methodist-supported school in St. Paul. Originally intending to become a minister, he changed his studies to physics and in 1927 received his B.S. degree in this field. Page immediately joined the U.S. Naval Research Laboratory (NRL) in Washington, D.C. as a junior physicist. Somewhat later he started part-time studies at George Washington University, eventually earning a M.S. degree.

Although Page had no formal education in electrical engineering, building radios had been his hobby since childhood. Assigned to the NRL Radio Division, he quickly gained the confidence of the Division Superintendent, A. Hoyt Taylor, by providing creative solutions to a wide variety of problems.

Following an observation by Lawrence A. Hyland in 1930 of radio interference caused by a passing aircraft, Taylor and Leo C. Young began an internally funded, low-level project to develop a radio-detection apparatus based on continuous wave (CW) Doppler interference. Unsuccessful with the CW approach, in 1934 Young suggested using a pulsed transmitter, similar to one that the NRL had built in 1925 for the Carnegie Institution of Washington in measuring the altitude of the ionosphere. Taylor assigned Page to design an apparatus for testing this suggestion.

A 60-MHz (5.0-m) pulse-modulated transmitter was soon built; this generated 10-microsecond pulses with a wait-time of 90 microseconds between pulses. Using a large antenna atop the main NRL building and a separately located receiver modified to pass the pulse signals, Page began assembling the equipment. In December 1934, Page first successfully tested the apparatus, tracking an aircraft at up to one mile as it flew up and down the Potomac River. Although the detection range was small and the indications on the oscilloscope monitor were almost indistinct, it represented a proof of the basic concept.

Based on this, Page, Taylor, and Young are generally credited with developing the world's first radar system. (RADAR is an acronym for RAdio Detection And Ranging. Thus, to be called a "radar," a system must both detect a target and measure the range to the target. Many earlier systems had functioned only to detect without measuring range.)

After the successful demonstration of the concept, in 1935 the U.S. Senate appropriated $100,000 for further research and development of the system, now classified as Secret. Page spent much of the year improving the bandwidth and sensitivity of the receiver. In June 1936, the NRL's first prototype radar system, now operating at 28.6 MHz, was demonstrated to government officials, successfully tracking an aircraft at distances up to 25 miles.

This equipment required large antennas, making it impractical for ship mounting. Attention was then given to increasing the system operating frequency and, subsequently, decreasing the antenna size (antenna size is inversely proportional to the operating frequency). For the follow-on system, the frequency was raised to 200 MHz, the limit for transmitter tubes and other components at that time; this allowed the antenna to be greatly reduced in size.

Page and Young developed another important unit, the duplexer. This device allowed a common antenna to be used for both transmitting and receiving. With other improvements, a full prototype system was first tested at sea on the USS Leary (DD-158) in April 1937. Initially designated the XAF, the system was improved and tested, then placed into production as the CXAM radar, the first such system deployed by the U.S. Navy starting in May 1940. (The acronym RADAR was coined by the Navy at that time as a cover for the highly classified work in this new technology.)

Page, together with the staff at the NRL, made many other major contributions to the overall evolution of radar. In addition to the duplexer, another major invention was the ring oscillator, an arrangement that allowed multiple power tubes to function as one in a transmitter and greatly increasing the power. Still another was the plan position indicator (PPI), proving the well-known circular presentation on the screen of a cathode-ray tube.

When the high-power cavity magnetron from Great Britain was introduced into America by the Tizard Mission in 1940, Page turned his attention to microwave radar and, working with the MIT Radiation Laboratory and the Bell Telephone Laboratories, made invaluable contributions to this new technology. One of the most significant was a system that greatly improved the angular accuracy of tracking radars. Called monopulse radar, it was first demonstrated in 1943. This highly complex technology was later used in the AN/FPS-16, likely the most popular tracking radar in history.

Following World War II, the NRL returned to performing a wide variety of basic and applied research for all parts of the Navy. Page participated broadly in these activities and in 1957 was named the NRL Director of Research. He served in this position until he retired in 1966. In his four decades at the NRL, he was awarded 65 patents, 40 directly in radar, more than any other person or group of persons.

== Recognition ==
For his accomplishments at the Naval Research Laboratory, Page was recognized by three Presidents:

- Harry S. Truman, in 1946, awarded him the Certificate of Merit in aid of the war effort.
- Dwight D. Eisenhower, in 1960, presented him with the Presidential Award for Distinguished Civilian Service, the highest honor for a career employee.
- Ronald Reagan, in 1986, wrote to him remarking that 50 years after his initial radar work "our nation's scientists continue to rely on your research."

In 1957, he was awarded the Stuart Ballantine Medal from The Franklin Institute in Philadelphia, Pennsylvania.

In 1979, Page was inducted into the Minnesota Inventors Hall of Fame. He was awarded the D.Sc. Honorius Causa degree by Hamline University.

The Institute of Radio Engineers recognized Page with the 1953 Harry Diamond Memorial Award for "outstanding contributions to the development of radar.

== Personal ==
A devout Christian and creationist, Page lectured on the relationship of science and Biblical scripture throughout his career. Page died of heart failure in 1992 at Edina, Minnesota.
