= WDW (Washington, D.C.) =

Radio station in Washington, D.C. (1921–1923)

WDW was a very short-lived AM broadcasting station, licensed to the Radio Construction & Electric Co. in Washington, D.C., which was issued an initial license in December 1921, and deleted a few months later.

== History ==
Beginning in late 1912, radio communication in the United States was regulated by the Department of Commerce. Initially there were no formal standards for which stations could make broadcasts intended for the general public, and after World War I stations under a variety of license classes, most commonly Amateur and Experimental, began making regularly scheduled programs on a limited basis.

In the Washington metropolitan area a number of U.S. government-operated stations also experimented with broadcasting technology. The Navy's high-powered NAA in Arlington, Virginia, began making time signal broadcasts (in Morse Code) beginning in 1913. The Bureau of Standards was particularly active, and in May 1920 its Radio Laboratory station, WWV, was reported to be conducting weekly Friday evening concerts. In late 1920 a second Navy station, NOF, located in the Anacostia section of Washington, D.C., began to include music with its test transmissions, and on January 7, 1921, a live concert was heard as far away as Canada and Cuba. The Post Office Department was also involved, and on April 15, 1921, its WWX was one of four stations that began broadcasting daily market news reports.

At least three Washington, D.C. companies made early broadcasts while operating under amateur station authorizations. The Continental Electric Company later claimed that its station, 3SV, (Note: The "3" in 3SV's call sign indicated that the station was located in the third Radio Inspection district. The fact that the first letter, "S", fell in the range A-W meant that the station was operating under a standard Amateur license.) had been the first. The White & Boyer Co., operators of amateur station 3NR, ran an advertisement on December 3, 1921, which stated that "We transmit music from our own station on Tuesday and Friday evenings of each week from 7:30 to 9:45." (Continental later operated broadcast station WIL from 1922 to 1924, while White & Boyer operated WJH from December 1921 to March 1924).

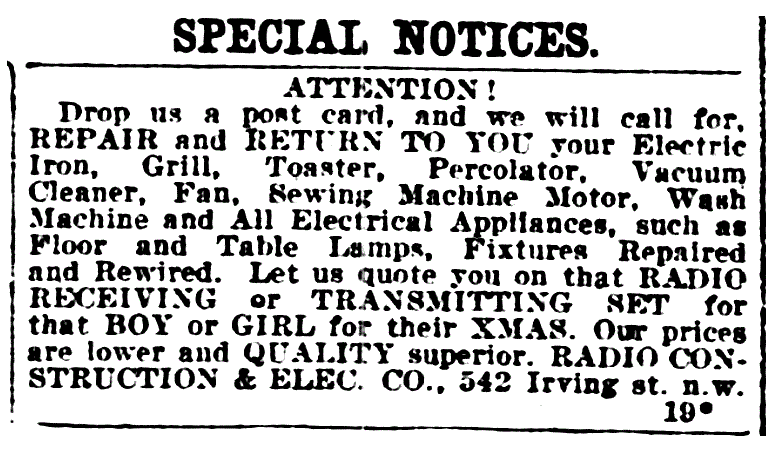
Radio Construction & Electric Co. advertisement (December 1921)

The Radio Construction Company, located at 542 Irving Street, N.W., also made early broadcasts over a standard amateur station, 3BAX, and the June 1, 1921 issue of the Washington Herald reported that "Station 3BAX, manned by W. G. Eldridge has just begun to send out concerts every Monday, Wednesday and Saturday evenings, beginning at 7:30 o'clock."

Responding to growing broadcasting activity on a national scale, the Department of Commerce adopted regulations effective December 1, 1921 to formally establish a broadcast service category, which set aside the wavelength of 360 meters (833 kHz) for "entertainment" broadcasting, and 485 meters (619 kHz) for "market and weather reports". Under this new regulation, WDW's first, and only, broadcasting station license was issued on December 22, 1921, to the Radio Construction & Electric Co. for a thirty-day period, for operation on the 360 meter "entertainment" wavelength. However, WDW's broadcasting career, if any, was extremely brief. The station's one month initial operating license was never renewed, and WDW was formally deleted in May 1922.

There is very limited additional information about the Radio Construction & Electric Co. For a couple years beginning in the summer of 1921 the company also held an experimental station license, 3XZ. (Note: The "X" in 3XZ's call sign indicated that it was operating under an Experimental license.) A local listener reported hearing 3XZ in the summer of 1922, but the station was deleted in mid-1923. In April 1923 a classified advertisement listed the company's address as the location of a "great sacrifice sale of all radio apparatus" that "must be sold on account of removal to new quarters".

== See also ==
- List of initial AM-band station grants in the United States
