= NOF (radio station) =

Radio station in Washington, D.C. (1920–1922)

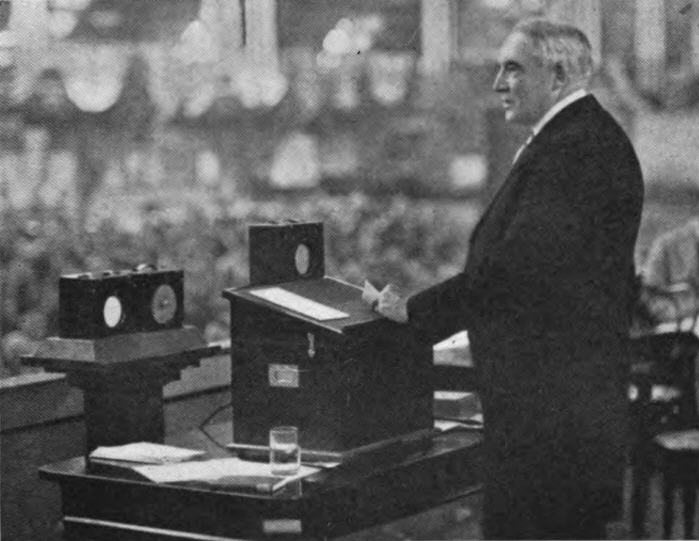
President Harding gave the first presidential speech to be carried by radio on May 18, 1922, over NOF, speaking before the Chamber of Commerce of the United States in Washington, D.C.

NOF was one of the call signs used in the 1920s by a radio station located at the Naval Air Station in Anacostia, D.C. This call sign was used when the station was making general and experimental broadcasts, while the call sign NSF was generally used when the station was conducting regular business. From 1920 to 1922 the Anacostia station was the primary radio outlet employed by the U.S. government for making public broadcasts. However, in early 1923 responsibility for these programs was transferred to station NAA in Arlington, Virginia, and the Anacostia station returned to generally being used for research, thus primarily using the NSF call sign. However, a few public demonstrations, most notably Charles Jenkins' mid-1920s television experiments, were later conducted under the NOF call sign.

On May 18, 1922, NOF broadcast the first U.S. presidential radio appearance, when it carried a speech given by Warren Harding to the U.S. Chamber of Commerce in Washington, D.C. On May 30, 1922, NOF broadcast the dedication ceremonies of the Lincoln Memorial jointly with NAA, which was the first time that two stations simultaneously carried the same program. In addition, NOF's December 8, 1922 broadcast of President Harding's speech to a joint assembly of the House of Representatives and Senate was the first presidential address to the U.S. Congress carried by radio.

== History ==
NOF's development as a broadcasting station evolved from signal propagation research conducted by the head of the Aircraft Radio Laboratory, A. Hoyt Taylor. In 1920, it was thought that transmissions on higher frequencies had very limited ranges compared to lower frequencies. Because of this, most amateur radio stations in the United States were restricted to operating on the "useless" frequencies above 1500 kHz. Taylor thought that there might be a need within the Navy for short-range communication, so he and Leo C. Young began a project to evaluate potential uses for these higher frequencies. This effort required close coordination with the established amateur stations in order to gain information about transmission characteristics. This initial work was performed under the NSF call sign.

To make participation more interesting for the amateurs, Taylor began to include music transmissions produced by his "old Columbia phonograph and a few very old records". Over time the operation became more organized, and a regular schedule of programs was instituted, conducted by unpaid volunteers and held two evenings each week. A small studio that included a piano was prepared, and on January 7, 1921, a live concert, which Taylor described as "the first time a concert has been transmitted over the wireless telephone from the Anacostia station and one of the first held in this country", was heard as far away as Canada and Cuba. As knowledge about the station's existence spread, various government departments became interested in participating. In December 1921, the station began featuring bi-weekly lectures presented by the Public Health Service.

Members of Congress soon became involved. On February 10, 1922, Representative John L. Cable of Ohio gave a short speech on "Abraham Lincoln, the Congressman". The first U.S. senator to make a broadcast over the station was Henry Cabot Lodge of Massachusetts, who was followed on March 30 by Senator Harry New of Indiana, who made a campaign speech directed toward his supporters in Indianapolis. New's partisan speech immediately stirred up controversy about the propriety of using a government station for political reasons, and in early April Secretary of the Navy Edwin Denby announced an end to all political broadcasts over government radio stations. The ban was expanded to eliminate almost all spoken word broadcasts, including nonpartisan talks by government employees, pending an official review of what standards should be adopted. Secretary Denby initially authorized an exception giving approval to broadcast the dedication of the National Woman's Party headquarters on May 22, which would have been carried by both NOF and NAA. But just prior to the event Acting Secretary of the Navy Theodore Roosevelt Jr. stepped in to deny permission for the broadcast, ruling it was too political.

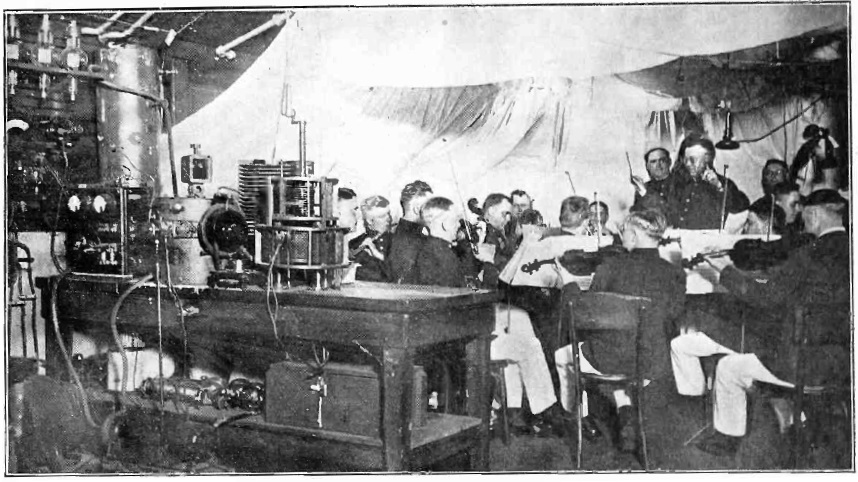
U.S. Marine Band playing at an NOF studio. (1922)

Events considered to be of national importance were exempt from the ban, and NOF carried the first two radio broadcasts made by a sitting U.S. president. The first took place on May 18, 1922, when the station carried President Warren Harding's speech, "Honest Commerce is Nation's Need", made before the United States Chamber of Commerce in Washington, D.C. The next broadcast was of the Lincoln Memorial dedication ceremonies on May 30, 1922, which included speeches by both Harding and Supreme Court Chief Justice William Howard Taft. This broadcast was also the first time that two radio stations simultaneously carried the same program: NOF, transmitting on a wavelength of 412 meters (728 kHz), was joined by NAA Arlington, operating on a longwave wavelength of 2,650 meters (113 kHz). Listeners in Frederick, Maryland commented that Harding's "voice seemed well adapted for broadcasting".

There were plans for a third Navy broadcast, of Harding's June 14 dedication of the Francis Scott Key Monument at Fort McHenry in Baltimore, Maryland, which would have included a third station, NSS in nearby Annapolis. However, the Chesapeake and Potomac Telephone Company, which had provided the telephone lines used for the earlier remote pickups, refused to furnish the lines needed to connect the Navy stations, so the broadcast was instead carried only by WEAR, a station affiliated with the Baltimore American newspaper.

On May 31, 1922, NOF introduced Wednesday night concerts by the United States Marine Band, which would be one of its most popular features. Within a month the station received letters from listeners located in sixteen U.S. states and two Canadian provinces. By July the concerts were also presented on Friday evenings, although they were suspended from September to November when the band went on tour.

In early August the ban on most spoken broadcasts was ended, and wide variety of programs and talks, mostly provided by government agencies, was introduced. On December 8, 1922, NOF carried the first broadcast of a presidential address to the U.S. Congress, with Harding speaking to a joint assembly of the House of Representatives and Senate. As of December 1922 NOF's extensive schedule was reported as:

"On Monday, Tuesday, and Thursday evenings, the Treasury Department broadcasts deal with the activities of the Public Health, Internal Revenue, and Savings Bureaus. The Commerce Department's schedule on Tuesday and Thursday evenings includes information on foreign and domestic markets, trade news, and fisheries. Talks on immigration, women's activities and child welfare are made on Monday, Tuesday, and Thursday evenings by officials of the Labor Department. The Interior Department furnishes lectures on education and mining on Monday and Thursday evenings and Tuesday afternoons. Information pertaining to crops and weather is transmitted every Monday, Tuesday, and Thursday evening by the Department of Agriculture. Officers of the Department of War will shortly broadcast a series of talks on military activities and recruiting on Monday evenings. Sometimes special broadcasts are arranged for national associations, such, for example, as the series of speeches on Naval Activities by officers of the Navy, requested by the American Marine Association during its exposition in New York. The evening programs are so grouped as to make a compact schedule and not interfere with private broadcasting."

However, NOF's broadcasting activities soon came to an end, as that same month it was decided that the Anacostia facility should focus on research instead of programs for a general audience. It was therefore reported that:

"Station NOF, Naval Air Station, Anacostia, D. C., ceased to function as a broadcasting station January 3, 1923, being rededicated to its original work as a research laboratory devoted to problems arising from the use of wireless apparatus on board air craft. The broadcasting service of NOF has been taken over by Station NAA, United States Navy Department, Arlington, or Radio, Virginia."

After this, the NOF call letters were rarely used. However, on March 3, 1923 Charles Jenkins successfully sent a slow-scan image of President Harding from the station, operating as NOF, to the Evening Bulletin in Philadelphia. The NOF call letters briefly reappeared in 1925, when Jenkins demonstrated simple images transmitted from Anacostia by his mechanical television invention.
