= KXO-FM =

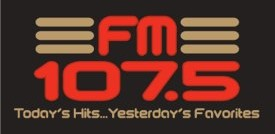
- El Centro, California; United States
- Broadcast area: Imperial Valley, California; Mexicali, Baja California
- Frequency: 107.5 MHz
- Branding: KXO FM 107.5

Programming
- Language: English
- Format: Adult contemporary

Ownership
- Owner: KXO Inc.
- Sister stations: KXO

History
- First air date: August 2, 1976
- Call sign meaning: derived from AM sister station

Technical information
- Licensing authority: FCC
- Facility ID: 35970
- Class: B
- ERP: 50,000 watts
- HAAT: 87 meters (285 ft)
- Transmitter coordinates: 32°48′24.2″N 115°32′47″W

Links
- Public license information: Public file; LMS
- Website: kxoradiofm1075.com

KXO-FM (107.5 FM) is a commercial radio station licensed to El Centro, California, United States, and serving the Imperial Valley, California and Mexicali, Baja California. It broadcasts an adult contemporary format and is owned and operated by KXO Inc., alongside KXO (1230 AM), with studios and transmitter both located in El Centro.

== History ==
KXO-FM signed on the air on August 2, 1976. It was the FM counterpart to KXO (1230 AM).

It has always been separately programmed from its sister station. In the 1970s, KXO AM had a full service, middle of the road format, while KXO-FM broadcast an automated beautiful music format. It played quarter-hour sweeps of mostly instrumental cover versions of popular songs as well as Broadway and Hollywood show tunes.

In the 1980s, as the audience for easy listening music began to age, more vocals were added until the station switched to soft adult contemporary music. In the early 2000s, the tempo of the music picked up and KXO-FM transitioned to mainstream adult contemporary.

== See also ==
- List of three-letter broadcast call signs in the United States
