= Albert H. Taylor =

American electrical engineer

Albert H."Radar" Taylor
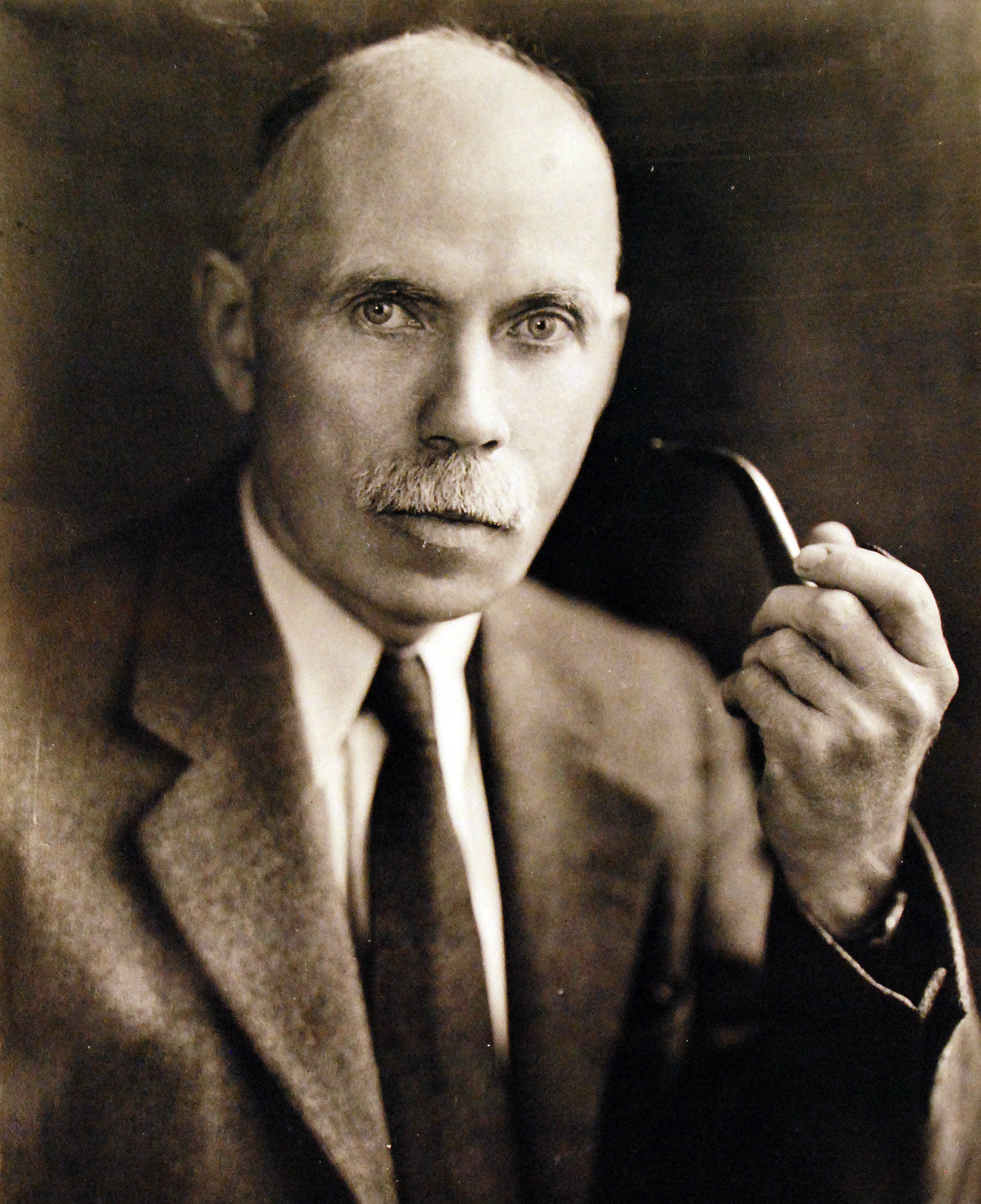
- U.S. Navy photograph, July 1945
- Born: January 1, 1879; Chicago, Illinois, U.S.
- Died: December 11, 1961 (aged 82); Los Angeles, California, U.S.
- Education: Northwestern University; University of Göttingen
- Awards: IEEE Medal of Honor (1942); Medal for Merit
- Scientific career
- Fields: Electrical engineering
- Thesis: Über die Wechselstromvorgänge in der Aluminiumzelle (1909)

Albert Hoyt Taylor (January 1, 1879 in Chicago, IL – December 11, 1961 in Los Angeles, CA) was an American electrical engineer who made important early contributions to the development of radar.

== Biography ==
Taylor entered Northwestern University in 1896. In 1899 he was employed by Western Electric Co. He returned to Northwestern in 1900, lacking only one semester of graduating when lack of funds forced him to accept a position as an instructor at Michigan State College. He was awarded his Bachelor of Science degree by Northwestern University in 1902. He taught at the University of Wisconsin–Madison from 1903 to 1908 before going to Germany for his graduate studies, receiving a Ph.D. degree from the University of Göttingen in 1909. He then joined the faculty at the University of North Dakota, where he built an experimental radio station and studied antennas and wave propagation. He continued in this capacity until 1917.

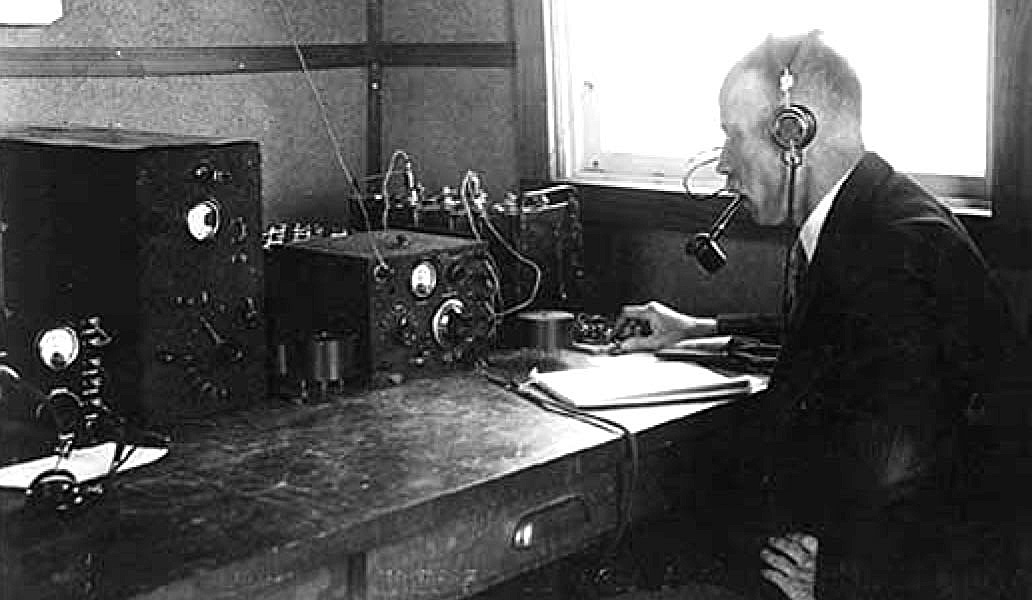
at work at the Naval Research Laboratory

On March 13, 1917, Taylor was appointed Lieutenant, US Naval Reserve Force, Provisional and assigned to the 9th, 10th and 11th Naval Districts, Great Lakes, IL through Oct. 12, 1917. Upon the outbreak of the war, he was assigned duty as District Communications Officer, Ninth Naval District, Goat Lake, Ill. He was Director, Naval Communications, Washington, D.C., until Oct. 17, 1917. He was Communication Superintendent, Naval Radio Station, Belmar, NJ, until July 25, 1918. He was appointed to head an experimental division of the Naval Air Station in Hampton Roads, VA where research on aircraft radio was undertaken through Sept. 30, 1918. He then became head of the Aircraft Radio Laboratory at Naval Air Station, Anacostia, Washington, DC. He was promoted to Lieutenant Commander, U. S. Naval Reserve Force, on June 8, 1918, and to Commander, US Naval Reserve Force, on Nov. 14, 1918. He resigned from active Navy duty in 1922, but remained as a civilian employee.

In the fall of 1922, Taylor and Leo C. Young were conducting communication experiments at the Aircraft Radio Laboratory when they noticed that a wooden ship in the Potomac River was interfering with their signals; in effect, they had demonstrated the first continuous wave (CW) interference detector. The next year the U.S. Naval Research Laboratory (NRL) was founded and Taylor became head of its Radio Division. In the early 1930s, the idea of pulsing a transmitter to provide both detection and range measurement occurred to Taylor and Young, as it had to German and British scientists. Taylor instructed an assistant, Robert Morris Page to construct a working prototype; this was demonstrated in December 1934, detecting an airplane at a distance of one mile. By 1937, his team had developed a practical shipboard radar that became known as CXAM radar, a technology very similar to that of Britain's Chain Home radar system.

In 1929 Taylor was President of the Institute of Radio Engineers (IRE), and from 1936 to 1942 he served on the Communication Committee of the American Institute of Electrical Engineers. Both of these organizations were predecessors to what is now the IEEE.

Taylor remained at NRL until his retirement in 1948. He died in 1961, at age 82.

== Awards ==
- 1927 – Morris Liebmann Memorial Prize from the IRE, for research on short waves
- 1942 – IRE Medal of Honor, for "contributions to radio communication as an engineer and organizer, including pioneering work in the practical application of piezoelectric control to radio transmitters, early recognition and investigation of skip distances and other high-frequency wave-propagation problems, and many years of service to the government of the United States as an engineering executive of outstanding ability in directing the Radio Division of the Naval Research Laboratory"
- 1944 – On March 28, the first Medal for Merit from the U.S. Government (together with John C. Garand), for his contributions to "the discovery and development of radar".
- 1959 – Stuart Ballantine Medal from The Franklin Institute in Philadelphia, Pennsylvania.

== See also ==
=== Archives ===
There is an Albert H. Taylor fonds at Library and Archives Canada. The archival reference number is R3871.
