= KXO (AM) =

- El Centro, California; United States
- Broadcast area: Imperial Valley
- Frequency: 1230 kHz
- Branding: KXO AM 1230

Programming
- Format: Oldies
- Affiliations: ABC News Radio; San Diego Padres Radio Network; Los Angeles Chargers Radio Network; Los Angeles Lakers Radio Network

Ownership
- Owner: KXO Inc.
- Sister stations: KXO-FM

History
- First air date: January 7, 1927; 99 years ago
- Former call signs: KGEN (1927–1928)

Technical information
- Licensing authority: FCC
- Facility ID: 35969
- Class: C
- Power: 830 watts day; 1,000 watts night
- Transmitter coordinates: 32°48′24.2″N 115°32′47″W

Links
- Public license information: Public file; LMS
- Website: KXOradio.com

KXO (1230 kHz) is a commercial AM radio station licensed to El Centro, California. It airs an oldies format and is owned by KXO, Inc. Its studios and offices are on Main Street in El Centro, along with sister station KXO-FM 107.5.

KXO operates with 830 watts daytime and 1,000 watts at night. It is a Class C station, so its signal is limited to the Imperial Valley. The transmitter site is off West Villa Avenue.

== Programming ==
KXO broadcasts oldies music with a playlist from the 1960s and 1970s, along with some 1980s titles. It also carries the games of several Southern California sports teams: San Diego Padres baseball, Los Angeles Chargers football and Los Angeles Lakers basketball. CBS News Radio is heard at the beginning of most hours.

== History ==
KXO is the oldest station in the Imperial Valley, and is probably the oldest in any community between San Diego and Phoenix. It was first licensed, as KGEN, to E. R. Irey and F. M. Bowles on January 7, 1927. The original call letters were randomly assigned from an alphabetic roster of available call signs.

On November 11, 1928, with the implementation of the Federal Radio Commission's General Order 40, the station was assigned to 1200 kilohertz with a power of 100 watts, and at the same time changed call letters to KXO. (In Southern California, the only three-letter stations that remain, apart from KXO, are KFI, KHJ and KNX in Los Angeles and KGB in San Diego. KGB-FM is the FM sister station to the original KGB, now KLSD.)

In 1930 KXO moved to 1500 kHz. In the 1930s the studios were at 793 Main Street. After the North American Regional Broadcasting Agreement (NARBA) took effect in 1941, KXO moved to 1490 kHz. It was owned by Valradio, Inc. and was a network affiliate of the Mutual Broadcasting System and the Don Lee Network, during the "Golden Age of Radio." Over the years, it spent time as an affiliate of ABC and NBC Radio. In 1944, KXO moved to AM 1230.

In 1963, the governments of the U.S. and Mexico agreed to give El Centro two TV stations, channel 7 and channel 9, whose signals would include parts of Mexico. KXO, Inc. received permission from the Federal Communications Commission to build a TV station, KXO-TV (channel 7). A TV station in Yuma, Arizona, KIVA (channel 11), worked to block the competing stations, saying there was not enough economic activity in the region to support three commercial TV stations. KECY-TV (channel 9) eventually made it on the air in December 1968, but KXO-TV never did. Channel 7 finally came on the air in 1996, under the ownership of Entravision Communications, as KVYE.

Over the years, KXO featured several different programming formats. The station has had news and weather sharing partnerships with television stations KECY-TV and KSWT. Some on-air personalities and newscasters have also been heard on KXO and the TV stations.

In November 2026, Eric Rodriguez entered into a deal to purchase KXO and KXO-FM from owners Gene Brister and J.C. Buckley for $300,000. Born in Brawley, Rodriguez has served as a police officer, social worker and Central Union High School District trustee.

== See also ==
- List of three-letter broadcast call signs in the United States
