= Waking Down in Mutuality =

Spiritual teachings

Waking Down in Mutuality (also known as WDM, Waking Down) and Trillium Awakening, are a set of spiritual teachings and a community that seek to support the integration of spiritual awakening into ordinary human life. Waking Down and Waking Down in Mutuality are registered trademarks of Saniel Bonder and Linda Groves-Bonder. The teachings are also offered through the Trillium Awakening Teachers Circle (formerly known as the Waking Down Teachers Association), a non-profit association of autonomous teachers.

Waking Down was founded by Saniel Bonder in the early 1990s after (and partially as a reaction to) 20 years of work with his former guru, Adi Da Samraj. While acknowledging the necessity for an organization to have some amount of hierarchy, and for a teaching organization to have a body of recognized teachers, WDM and Trillium Awakening describe their work as aspirant (or participant) centered rather than teacher, guru, or organization centered.

Waking Down in Mutuality teachings are offered by the Bonders, through The Trillium Awakening Teachers Circle, and through an educational non-profit for the training of teachers, The Institute of Awakened Mutuality. Trillium Awakening teachers do their work mostly in the form of "sittings" (interactive gatherings), private sessions between teachers and students, and workshops which are taught either by a single teacher or by multiple teachers working together.

Bonder describes his teaching on spiritual awakening as similar to Zen and Advaita Vedanta in that it assumes the reality of nondual consciousness, but also as different from them. According to WDM, realizing that one is not exclusively one's human nature makes it possible to live that nature more fully, rather than requiring rejection of it. For this reason WDM encourages attention to the passionate and embodied aspects of human being, an orientation it holds in common with the tantric traditions of India. The integration of the worldly and spiritual dimensions of life, and the attention to conscious mutual relationships this is said to entail, is central to the Waking Down teaching.

== History ==
=== Saniel Bonder ===
In early 1974 Saniel Bonder joined the community of the American spiritual teacher Bubba Free John (later known as Adi Da) where he quickly became a principal writer, editor, and educator. In 1990, he published a full-length biography of Adi Da, and went on tour promoting the book and his teacher’s spiritual work. In 1992, after 18 years of study and leadership in that community, Bonder found himself in personal crisis. He struggled with a loss of integrity that he experienced as the mouthpiece of a spiritual community that he increasingly perceived as dictatorial. In December, shortly after leaving Adi Da's work, he described himself as experiencing a new state of spiritual awakening. He called this shift "the second birth," because his experience of the deep unity of spirit and matter was (as he saw it) a profound rebirth and renewal of his entire being. Bonder later stated that the overly controlling guru-centric path of his former teacher had become an expression of dysfunction. The use of formulas or strategies that are imposed despite how one feels about them is described as part of the "Hypermasculine" tendency and is considered counterproductive in the spiritual life.

=== Ma Tam Temple of Being ===
In 1995 Saniel Bonder established a nonprofit organization: "Ma-Tam Temple of Being." The following year Bonder began holding open sittings in his small apartment in Marin County, California. He advocated the notion of "mutuality": a perspective that recognizes the need for the functional hierarchy between student and teacher but endeavors to simultaneously keep sight of the equality between them in their interactions. Students that attended these sittings spoke about their lives and their own sense of their "awakening process." In turn, Bonder offered counseling and what he termed "spiritual transmission": the communication of what he and his students considered his awakened state through gazing meditation, open conversation, and simply being together. Bonder then began naming advanced students as fellow teachers and taught with them alongside his partner (and present wife) Linda Groves. He explicitly recognized fellow Waking Down teachers as colleagues rather than subordinates, stating that this was a further distinction between himself and his former teacher.

In 1997 WDM teacher Ted Strauss organized a Waking Down Weekend workshop in collaboration with Bonder and other teachers. Thereafter, weekend workshops became an ongoing activity and staple of WDM work. With a new influx of students, Bonder and other Waking Down teachers developed the first teacher certification-training program in April 2001.

=== The Waking Down Teachers Association and The Institute of Awakened Mutuality ===
Ma Tam Temple of Being had been organized as a vehicle for Saniel Bonder's work. As more teachers were trained and the movement grew, the limits of an organization structured around a single teacher became apparent to both Bonder and the teachers involved. Many Waking Down teachers wanted to operate autonomously. It was stated by Bonder that the contradiction inherent in an organization of teachers of "mutuality" that was not owned and run by the teachers themselves was also uncomfortable for him. Starting in 2004 there were a number of attempts, mainly initiated by Bonder himself, to come up with a new way of organizing which distributed power more equitably. At the same time there was a consensus among WDM teachers that the training of new teachers in a standardized fashion was useful and that there was a need for organization to safeguard standards.

In February 2005, teachers CC Leigh, Krishna Gauci, and Ron Ambes formed "the Interim Advisors" and began working together to redesign the organizational structures of Waking Down in Mutuality. This was done at the instigation of Bonder and the other Waking Down teachers. In spring of 2005 all involved unanimously approved the restructuring plans and the Waking Down Teachers Association was incorporated.

All teachers of Waking Down, including founder Saniel Bonder, were equal members of the Waking Down Teachers Association (WDTA). The WDTA was a 501(c)(6) professional association created for the support of its members in their own work as autonomous teachers. All members agreed to abide by the ethics policies and to maintain a relationship with a peer supervision group through mandatory monthly mutuality support groups of 5 or 6 members.

In 2005 those members of WDTA who wished to train new Waking Down teachers (and educate through teaching seminars) formed The Institute of Awakened Mutuality (IAM), a 501(c)(3) educational non-profit corporation. This was done with the full and explicit ongoing support of the WDTA. IAM founding members were Hillary Davis, Deborah Boyar, Krishna Gauci, and Ron Ambes.

Despite the surface functionality in the relationship between Saniel and the WDTA for many years, undercurrents simmered and erupted from time to time, reflecting the inherent “genetic” differences of a founder in relationship with a collective of teachers. These longstanding tensions called for resolution in January 2014, when the WDTA used its established grievance process to address Saniel’s conduct in light of its longstanding ethics policies regulating teachers’ expression of anger and power. In March 2014, Saniel declared his intention to relinquish his WDTA membership. In May 2014, he & Linda Groves-Bonder applied privately to register the terms “Waking Down®” and “Waking Down in Mutuality®”, for which they were granted trademarks several months later.

For over a year, the WDTA and Saniel & Linda engaged in confidential negotiations to craft an agreement designating the WDTA as Saniel & Linda’s sole licensee authorized to use the terms “Waking Down” and “Waking Down in Mutuality” to brand its teachers’ work and course offerings. On June 6, 2015, Saniel, Linda, and their attorney terminated negotiations and indicated that the WDTA should rename itself and its work within a reasonable transition period.

=== The Trillium Awakening Teachers Circle (TATC) ===
On June 16, 2015, a vote was taken, and 33 teachers unanimously chose to rename the organization. The name Trillium Awakening™ was selected to describe the organization’s educational offerings and coaching services on December 10, 2015, and the Waking Down Teachers Association was renamed as the Trillium Awakening Teachers Circle (TATC) on January 10, 2016. It continues as a professional association of awakened, self-actualizing, autonomous teachers, chartered to help raise awareness of Trillium Awakening offerings and provide mutual support for its members.

The Trillium Awakening Teachers Circle (TATC) and Institute of Awakened Mutuality (IAM) are non-profit organizations that provide Trillium Awakening™ courses and services, which are based on the teachings of Waking Down in Mutuality. All Trillium Awakening teachers are free and independent agents and are officially encouraged to offer the work in their own unique ways.[6]

== Philosophy ==
=== Mutuality in organization and teaching ===
As the founding teacher of Waking Down in Mutuality, Saniel Bonder is held as the original source of the basic teachings and the energetic "transmission" that is said to be at the center of the process. Part of the teaching of "mutuality" is the understanding that the way that teachings and transmission are "drawn out" or generated from all teachers (including Bonder) is through their personal interactions with students and fellow teachers. Bonder's teachings in the 1990s were defined and refined by him in the midst of his interaction with his group of immediate students and the community around him. He advocated community empowerment and a conscious honoring of each teacher's unique way of teaching within this context.

It was through this give-and-take between Saniel Bonder and his students that the first Waking Down teachers were trained in an atmosphere in which students openly questioned the teacher and his actions. When control of the organization was passed on to the teachers trained by Bonder, this became the philosophy of the group as a whole.

It was Bonder's conviction that the most authentic form of living the awakened life in the 21st century is to animate one's human limitations in frank honesty rather than hiding behind a notion of the perfect teacher. An equally strong conviction was that whatever pain a teacher causes in his relationship with students must be openly acknowledged rather than dismissed. While it might be that a teacher's questionable actions were ultimately beneficial for everyone involved, this is never to be used as an excuse for anything a teacher does that causes hurt. In Waking Down, apologizing is considered a spiritual practice known as "Coconut Yoga" and is a central part of the teaching of mutuality. Bonder's work at the start of Waking Down was intensely personal and his spiritual teachings were shared alongside his emotionality, personal life, and imperfections. All teachers and participants were encouraged to share similarly. In WDM, the teacher is seen as being a mix of both elevated spirituality and human foibles living in relationship with the community.

=== Central teachings and terms ===
Waking: The exploring, ever deepening recognition, and claiming of one's nature as Consciousness. An experiential change in lived reality where the sense of identity shifts from exclusive identification with the separate finite, human body/mind to an expanded identity as both undefinable Consciousness and the limited human self, now with a distinct sense of being non-separate from all that is perceived. WDM is a path of spiritual awakening that does not imply or require a state of perfection or extensive purification.

Down: The exploring, ever deepening recognition, and claiming of one's own unique bodily human life. Ultimately falling into, and living as, a vulnerable sensitivity at the heart of life known as "the Core Wound," which is the paradox and felt rawness of simultaneously being both unlimited consciousness and finite matter. This awakening into non-separate embodiment makes it possible to uncover feelings that were previously too difficult to access. It may include investigating emotional wounds and doing shadow-work to free up trapped energy and attention and thereby become more fully alive and freely self-expressed. The capacity to experience uncomfortable feelings increases the capacity to experience nurturing and pleasurable feelings as well. This emotional “stretching” brings one in touch with a more authentic sense of oneself. “Down” work includes embracing every dimension of human existence so that all of the "energies" of being human, whether they be subtle/soul, emotional, sensual, or sexual, are all included in an integral embodiment.

Mutuality: The exploration, ever deepening recognition, and claiming of one's nature in relationship with others. Deeply acknowledging the way in which one lives in a world of others even as one recognizes awakened unity with the All of Being . Teachers are available and vulnerably revealing of their flawed humanity, helping to create a container for deep love and trust to grow. By interacting with others in mutuality one avoids the tendency to isolate into one's own subjective sense of things, which can be a liability in awakening and personal shadow-work.

== See also ==
- Enlightenment in Buddhism
