= WJU =

WJU may refer to:

- Wheeling Jesuit University, West Virginia, United States
- William Jessup University, Rocklin, California, US
- Wonju Airport, South Korea (IATA code: WJU)
