= WDM (Washington, D.C.) =

Radio station in Washington, D.C. (1921–1925)

WDM was an AM radio station, licensed to the Church of the Covenant in Washington, D.C., which was issued its first license in December 1921 and went off the air in mid-1925. It was also the first broadcasting station to be operated by a church.

== History ==
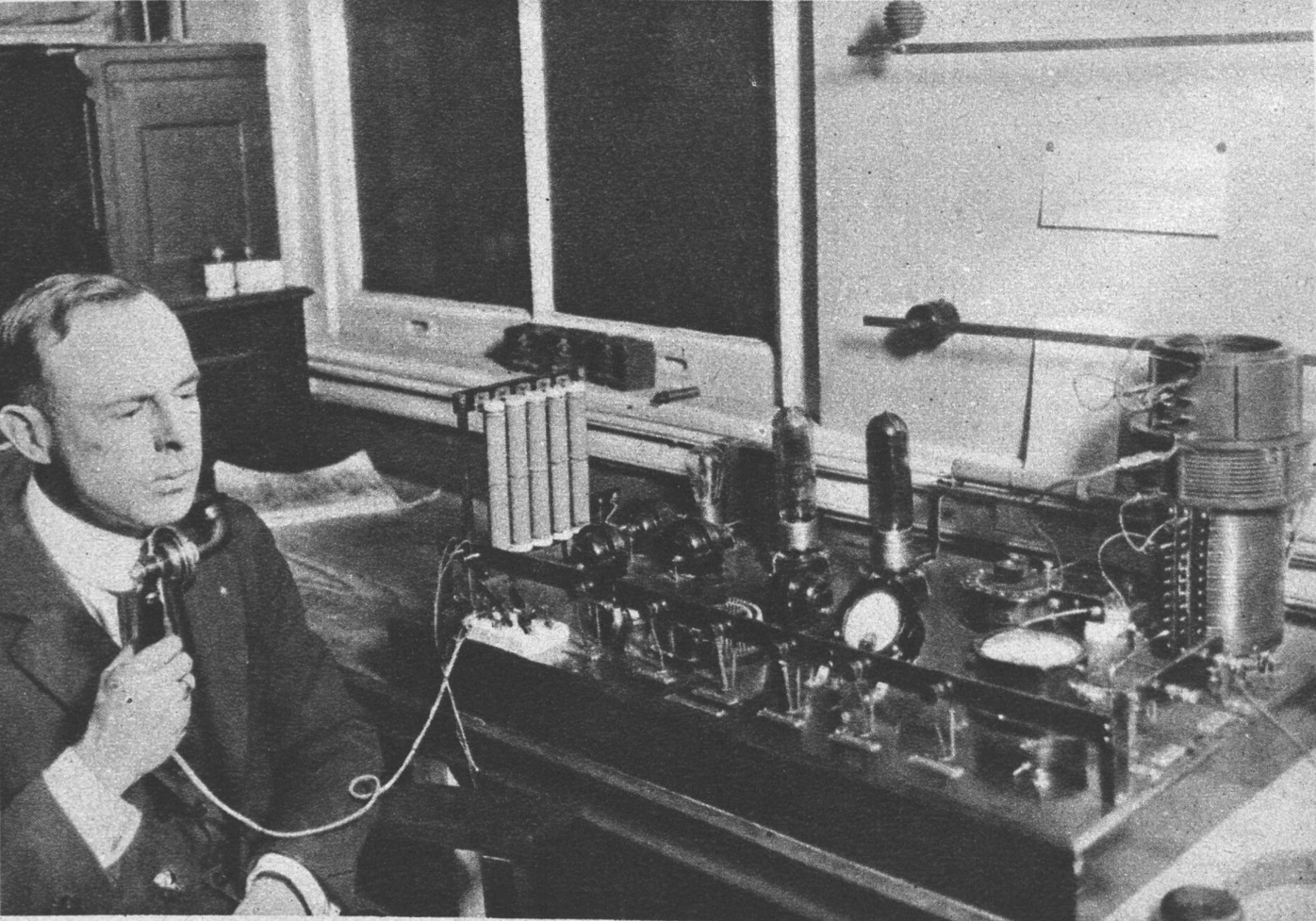
Local electrical engineer Thomas J. Williams built WDM's original transmitter.

WDM was first licensed on December 22, 1921, to the Church of the Covenant (now The National Presbyterian Church) at 18th and N Streets, N.W., in Washington, D.C., for broadcasting on the standard "entertainment" wavelength of 360 meters (833 kHz). The call letters were randomly assigned, and the station's equipment was constructed by local electrical engineer Thomas J. Williams. (Williams later founded station WPM, which operated for about a year beginning in early 1922). WDM was the first broadcasting station to be established by a religious body.

The station's debut broadcast was made on the afternoon of January 1, 1922, and featured a speech by Senator William Borah (R-Idaho) in support of the Four-Power Treaty. Programming primarily consisted of Sunday religious services. However, in September the station was used to broadcast Washington's first "radio wedding".

Initially all broadcasting stations transmitted on a single "entertainment" wavelength of 360 meters, which required regional time-sharing agreements. By late 1922 there were numerous stations in the Washington area sharing this wavelength, and a major dispute developed between WDM and a second Washington station on 360 meters, WJH. WDM regularly broadcast the 8:00 p.m. Sunday services of Reverend Charles Wood. However, on December 3, 1922, WJH began simultaneously broadcasting the Reverend Earle Wilfrey's service from the Vermont Avenue Christian Church, drowning out both stations for most listeners. The simultaneous transmissions were repeated on the evening of December 10, and the clashing signals began to gain national attention.

The Department of Commerce regulated U.S. radio at this time, and then-Secretary Herbert Hoover was asked to intervene in the dispute, but refused to become involved. The technology for keeping stations on their assigned frequencies was rudimentary at this time, and Rev. Wilfrey claimed that, either by purposeful adjustments or due to natural technical variations, the two stations, while nominally transmitting on the same frequency, were actually separated enough so that only the most unskilled listeners using primitive receivers were reporting problems. However, this did not resolve the issue, and despite talks between the two ministers, the two stations continued to schedule their conflicting 8:00 p.m. broadcasts until the middle of May. At this time the Commerce Department greatly expanded the number of available transmitting frequencies, and, as part of the implementation of the new policy, on May 15, 1923, WJH was reassigned to 273 meters (1100 kHz).

WDM was briefly deleted in late 1923 but quickly relicensed, now assigned to 1280 kHz. In mid-1925 it was reassigned to 1110 kHz. The station was reported to be still be active in late May 1925 but subsequently went silent, and was formally deleted on June 8, 1925. WDM's equipment was then donated to the Smithsonian Institution.

WDM, Church of the Covenant, Washington, D.C.

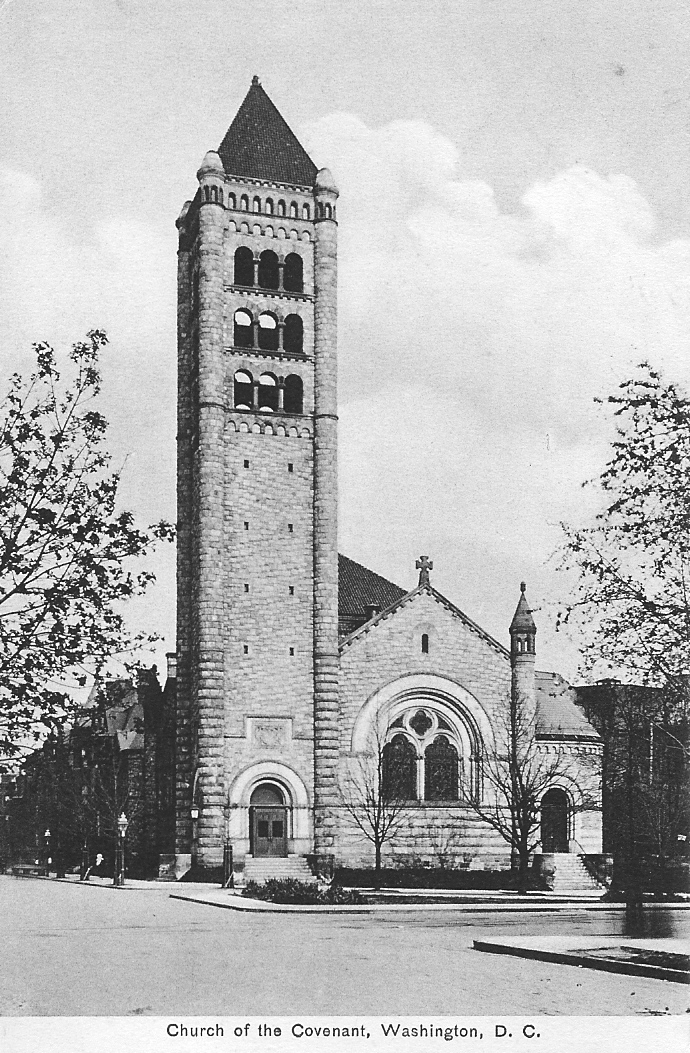
Church building located at 18th & N Streets, N.W.

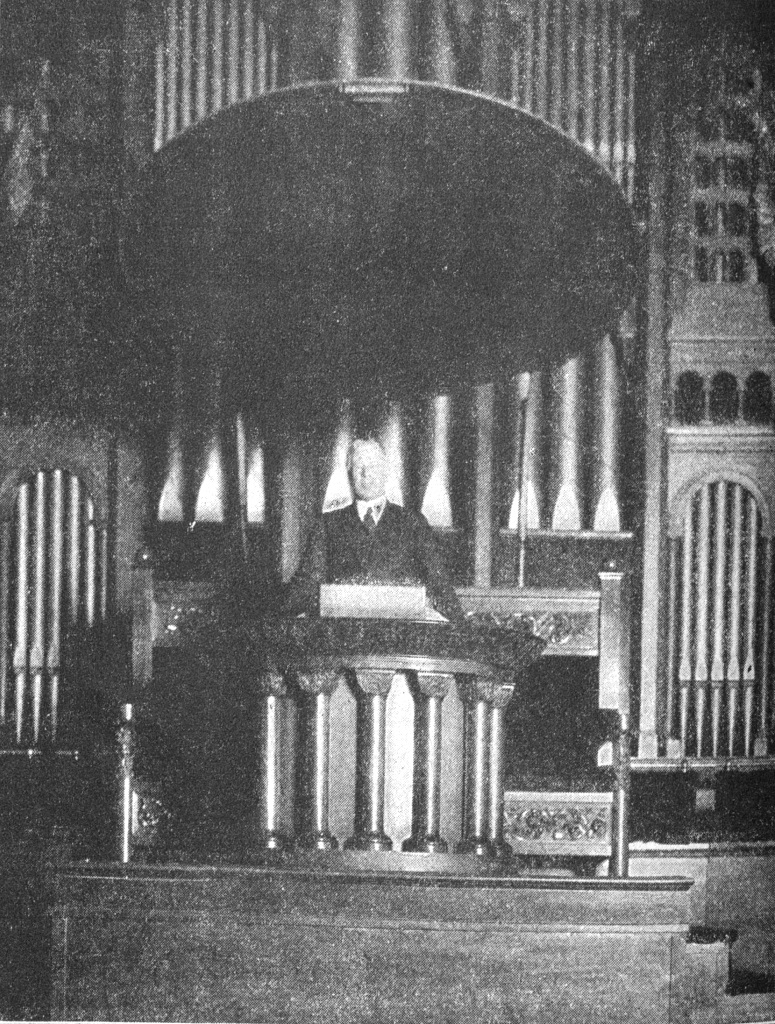
Dr. Charles Wood broadcasting from the church pulpit (1922)

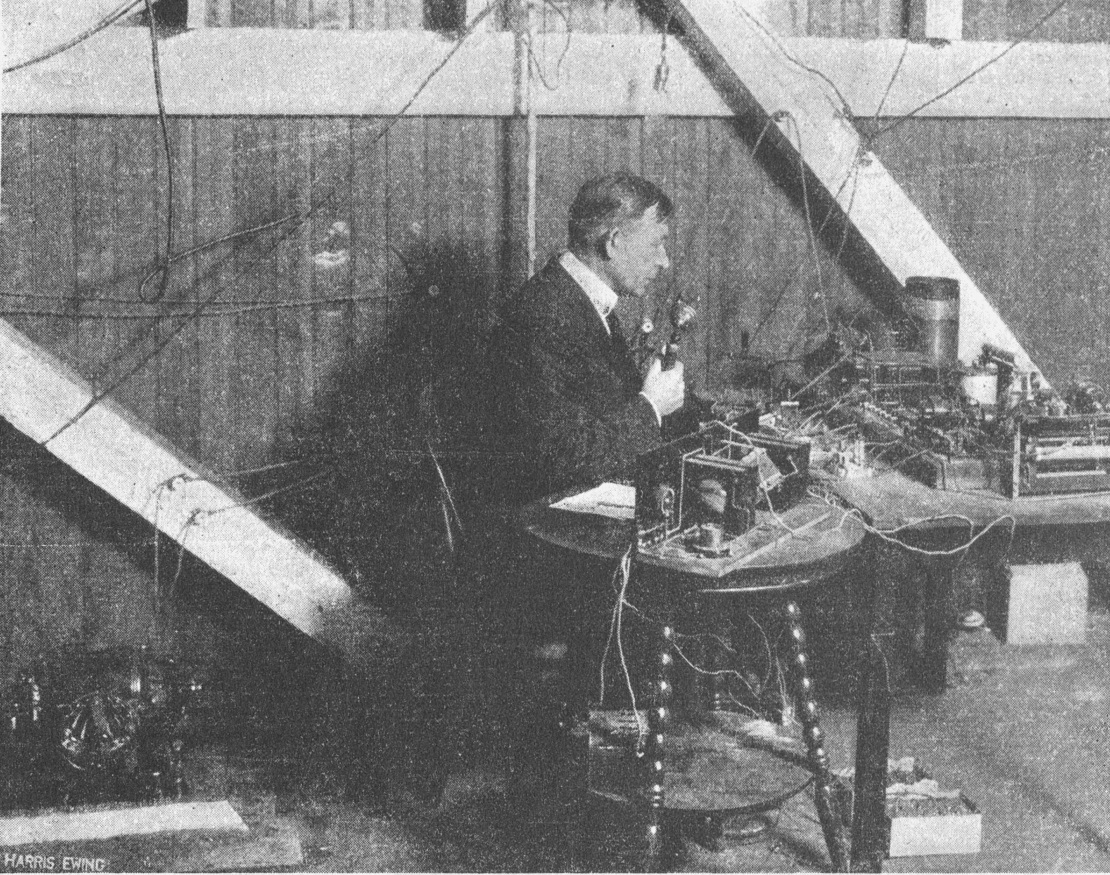
Testing the WDM transmitting equipment (1922)

== See also ==
- List of initial AM-band station grants in the United States
