= WGV (AM) =

Radio station in New Orleans, Louisiana (1922-1924)

WGV was a short-lived American AM radio station in New Orleans, Louisiana. First licensed on March 21, 1922, it was the first broadcasting station authorized in the state. WGV was deleted in June 1924.

== History ==
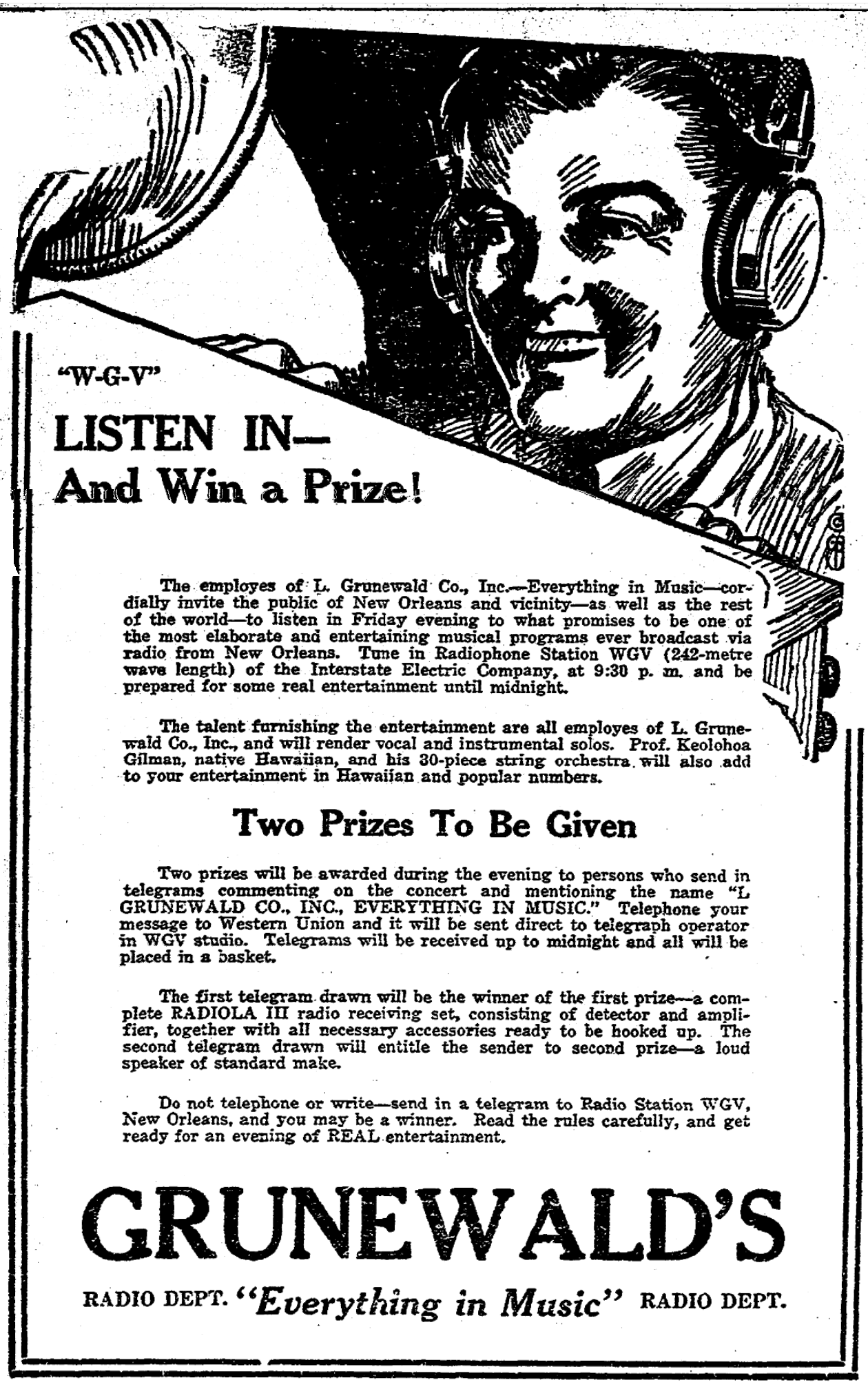
March 14, 1922 Grunewald's listening contest in conjunction with WGV.

The US Department of Commerce regulated radio stations in the United States from 1912 until the 1927 formation of the Federal Radio Commission. Originally there were no restrictions on which radio stations could make broadcasts intended for the general public. However, effective December 1, 1921, a regulation was adopted limiting broadcasting to stations operating under a Limited Commercial license that authorized operation on designated wavelengths of 360 meters (833 kHz) for "entertainment", and 485 meters (619 kHz) for "market and weather reports".

WGV was first licensed on March 21, 1922, to the Interstate Electric Company, for operation on 360 meters. The call sign was randomly issued from a list of available call letters. Currently most stations west of the Mississippi River have call letters beginning with "K". However, prior to the January 1923 establishment of the river as the boundary, call letters beginning with "W" were generally assigned to stations east of an irregular line formed by the western state borders from North Dakota south to Texas, with calls beginning with "K" going only to stations in states west of that line. Because there was only a single "entertainment" wavelength, WGV was required to establish a time sharing agreement with any other local stations broadcasting on 360 meters. Later that year, the station was also authorized to broadcast on the 485 meter "market and weather" wavelength. Programming was arranged by a local newspaper, the New Orleans Item.

There were reports of WGV operating as early as March 21. However, WGV's formal debut was announced by a banner headline on the front page of the April 7, 1922 New Orleans Item. The previous evening's programming was described as "Music, News Airphoned to Whole South", "as the first newspaper to take steps to bring the new wonders of radio-telephony within the reach of the people of New Orleans, Louisiana and neighboring states". That evening's schedule was listed as:
7 P.M—The Item's Uncle Wiggily Bedtime Story.
7:10 P.M.—Lullaby, vocal solo.
7:20 P.M.— Radiophone greetings by Mayor ANDREW McSHANE.
7:25 and 7:45 P.M.—Musical selections, orchestral and vocal.
7:45 P.M.—Address by PRESIDENT DINWIDDIE of Tulane University.
8 P.M.—Information for radio stations and operators by United States Inspector THEODORE DEILER.
8:10 P.M.—Strand Theatre orchestra, Strand Theatre singers.
8:30 P.M.—Address by Archbishop JOHN W. SHAW.

In early 1924, the station was assigned to 1240 kHz. In late March, it was announced the station was temporarily suspending programming after April 4, and would resume operations once microphone issues were resolved. However, the station was deleted in June 1924.

== See also ==
- List of initial AM-band station grants in the United States
