= NSS Annapolis =

Naval Communications Station Washington, D.C. Transmitter

Coordinates: 38°58′40″N 76°27′12″W

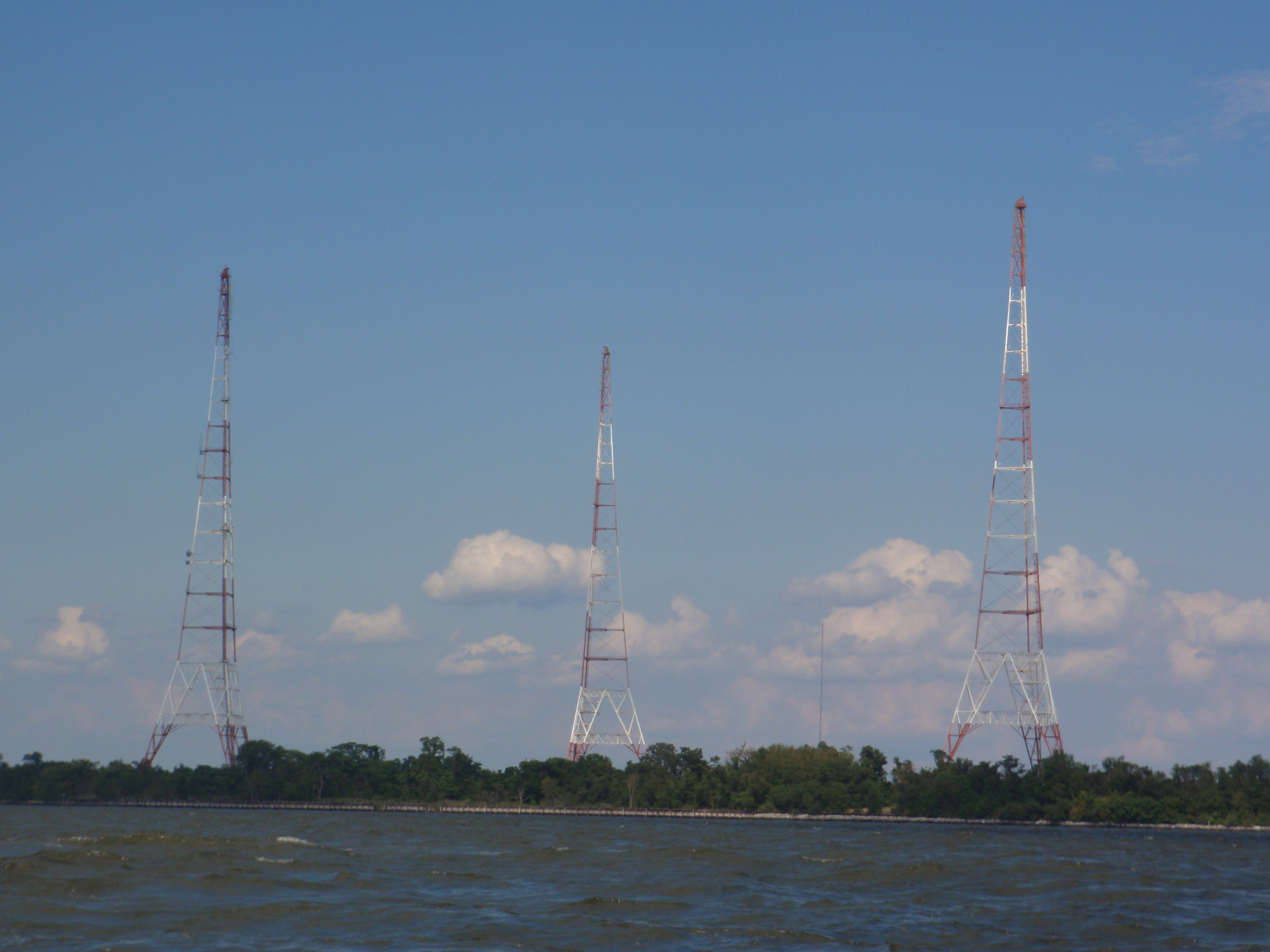
The 3 remaining towers of NSS Annapolis.

NSS Annapolis, officially known as Naval Communications Station Washington, D.C. Transmitter or NavCommStaWashingtonDC(T), was a Very Low Frequency (VLF) and High Frequency (HF) transmitter station operated by the United States Navy.

It was located at Greenbury Point, in Anne Arundel County, across the Severn River from Annapolis, Maryland. NSS Annapolis was used by the USN for submarine communication. The station consisted of an umbrella antenna supported by a 1,200-foot (365.76 m) high central mast, which was insulated against ground, 6 guyed masts of 800-foot (243.84 m) all of which were built in 1969 and three 600-foot freestanding towers built earlier. Originally the station consisted of nine 600-foot-tall self-supporting lattice towers, the tallest of their kind built in the United States to that date. The first four of which were built in 1918, followed by two more in 1922 and the final three in 1938. As of 2020, only the three built in 1938 remaining standing.

The huge towers were a local landmark, and served as a visual reporting point for aircraft landing at the nearby Baltimore-Washington International (BWI) airport. A golf course runs through the former HF antenna farm; special rules addressed hitting a tower with a ball (usually stroke and distance). The NSS HF receiver station, and the headquarters for NavCommStaWashingtonDC(T), was located at the Naval Communications Station in Cheltenham, Maryland until 1969. In late 1969, the receiver station at Cheltenham closed and a new receiving station was activated at Sugar Grove, West Virginia.

NSS began transmitting in September 1918 using a pair of Federal Electric 500 kilowatt Poulson Arc transmitters. However, arc transmitters were significantly inferior to the then state-of-the-art Alexanderson alternator and one of the arc transmitters was replaced by a more modern TAW 300 kilowatt vacuum tube transmitter in 1931. VLF, or "longwave" radio was the standard at the time for long-range radio transmission, only to be replaced by shortwave in the early 1930s.

VLF later became essential for communicating with submerged submarines, a critically important capability as submarines became strategic missile platforms. The NSS transmitter fed 500,000 watts of radio energy to its antenna, and during idle times, transmitted the string "W W W VVV VVV VVV DE NSS NSS NSS" in Morse code. Messages were also sent in Morse code, but were either prearranged code signals or were encrypted.

Rendered obsolete by satellite technology and the end of the cold war, NSS ceased operation and all of the antennas and most of the towers were demolished in 1999. Three of the smaller 600-foot towers were preserved near the tip of Greenbury Point to serve as aids to navigation for boaters on the Chesapeake Bay.

The NSS callsign, operating from the original NSS site on the Chesapeake Bay in Annapolis, is brought back to life for 16 hours every year during the MARS Armed Forces Day radio test. This is an annual event when amateur radio operators can work through crossband communications with certain military stations. .
