= NAA (Virginia) =

Radio station in Arlington, Virginia (1913–1941)

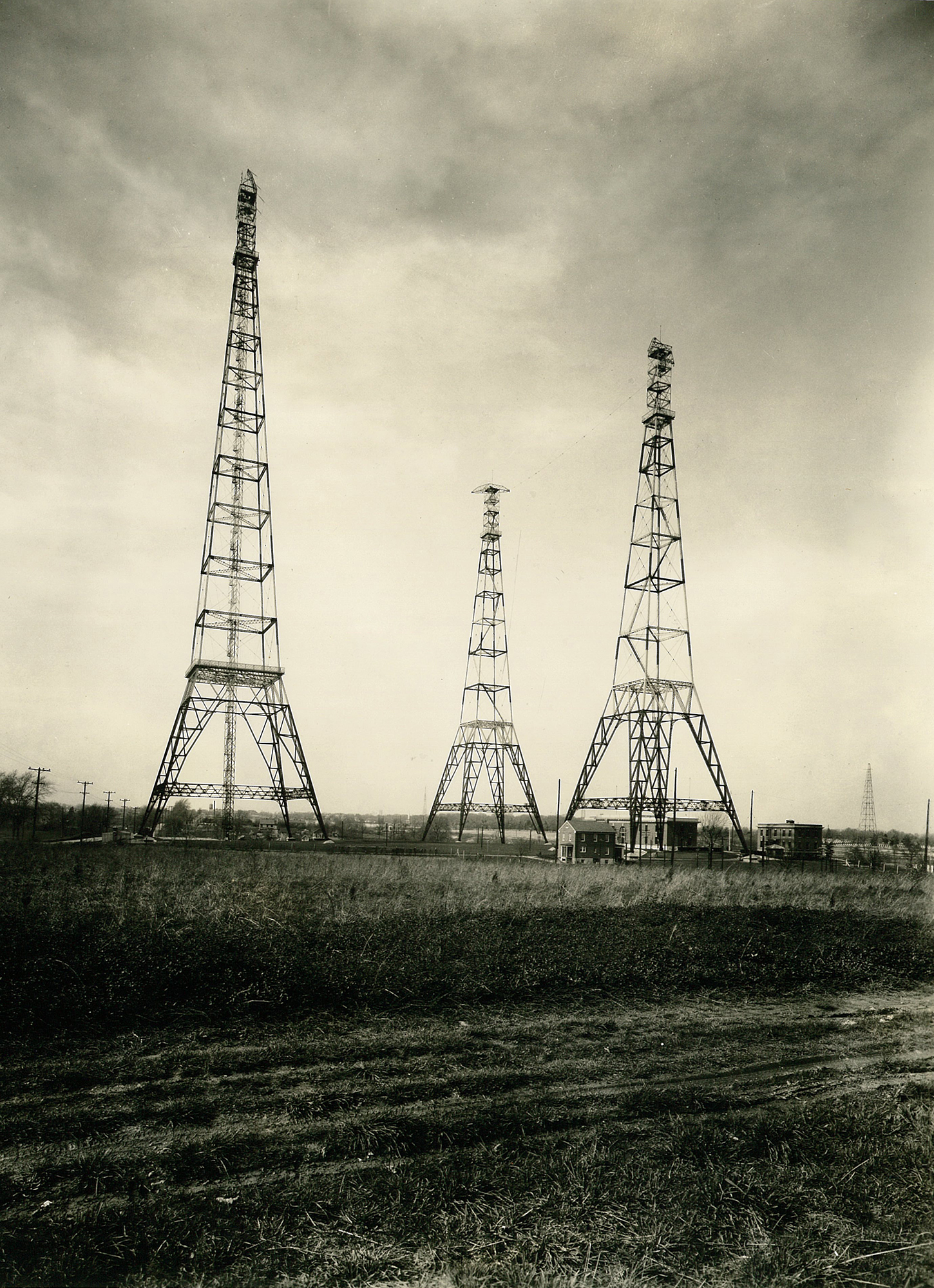
Arlington "three sisters" wireless towers (1913)

NAA was a major radio facility located at 701 Courthouse Road in Arlington, Virginia. It was operated by the U.S. Navy from 1913 until 1941. The station was originally constructed as the Navy's first high-powered transmitter for communicating with its bases across the U.S. and the Caribbean. During its years of operation NAA was best known for broadcasting daily time signals, however, it also provided a variety of additional services, using multiple transmitters operating on frequencies ranging from longwave to shortwave. The station also conducted extensive experimental work, including, in 1915, the Navy's first transatlantic transmission of speech.

== History ==
The establishment of NAA was the first step of an ambitious U.S. military project to establish reliable long distance radio communication. (At this time radio was commonly known as "wireless telegraphy".) The site chosen for the NAA installation, which became known as "Radio, Virginia", was across the Potomac River from Washington, D.C., adjacent to the Fort Myer military base in Arlington, Virginia. Construction began in 1911, and the most visible feature was the free-standing towers, known as "The Three Sisters", which supported the antenna wires. The main tower reached 600 feet (180 metres), while the other two towers were 450 feet (140 metres) tall. Two additional 200-foot (61-metre) towers were constructed in 1923.

Arlington was the first station in a proposed "High-Powered Chain" that would link the U.S. capital with much of the rest of the world. The initial transmitter was a 100 kilowatt rotary-spark, designed by Reginald Fessenden. Test transmissions that began in November 1912 were promising enough to convince the U.S. Congress to finance the construction of similar stations at San Diego, California, Darien in the Panama Canal Zone, Pearl Harbor, Hawaii, and Cavite in the Philippines.

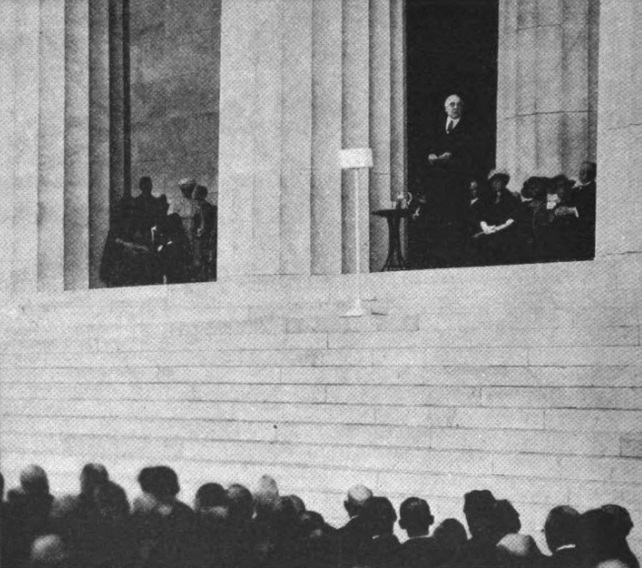
The Lincoln Memorial dedication ceremonies on May 30, 1922 were the first to be carried by two radio stations simultaneously—NAA and NOF in Anacostia, D.C.

Shortly after the NAA installation was completed, the Federal Telegraph Company got grudging permission to install one of its 35 kilowatt Poulsen arc transmitters, for comparative tests with the rotary-spark transmitter. To the surprise of Navy personnel, even though the arc transmitter had only about half the power, it was found to be clearly superior. As a result, arc transmitters would be installed at the other high-powered stations, and they became the standard for naval installations until the development of vacuum tube transmitters in the early 1920s. However, the Fessenden spark transmitter remained in use until July 8, 1923, when it was replaced by a vacuum tube transmitter.

From its inception in 1913 NAA was used to transmit daily time signals, which were supplied by the Naval Observatory in Washington, D.C. Accurate timekeeping was critical for ocean navigation, since an error in a ship's chronometer of even a few minutes could result in the vessel dangerously miscalculating its position. U.S. Navy radio stations had begun daily broadcasts of time signals in 1905, however due to their low power these station's transmission ranges were limited. NAA's high-powered signal meant it could be heard over a much greater area, covering much of the eastern United States and Atlantic ocean.

In addition to mariners, the time signals soon found two appreciative civilian audiences: amateur radio operators, interested in a practical benefit from their hobby, and jewelers, who previously had been reliant on time services transmitted over telegraph wires, which had a reputation for being both expensive and of questionable reliability, especially compared to the free and very accurate NAA transmissions.

NAA's original transmitters were only capable of producing the dots-and-dashes of Morse code. The later development of vacuum tube transmitters made audio transmissions practical, and in 1915 the American Telephone and Telegraph Company (AT&T) received permission from the Navy to conduct a series of tests at the NAA facility. These experimental transmissions set impressive new audio distance records, and were heard as far west as Hawaii. They were also received in Paris, France, which marked the first transmission of speech across the Atlantic.

With the entrance of the United States into World War I in April 1917 the federal government took over full control of the radio industry, and it became illegal for civilians to possess an operational radio receiver. However NAA continued to operate during the conflict. In addition to time signals and weather reports, it also broadcast news summaries received by troops on land and aboard ships in the Atlantic. Effective April 15, 1919 the ban on civilian reception of radio signals was lifted, so NAA's time signal transmissions were again available to the general public.

=== Broadcasting service ===
NAA Transmissions as of January 31, 1928

The transmitting schedules of Washington (Arlington (NAA)), exclusive of radiotelephone broadcast on 434.5 meters, 690 kc., are as follows:
8.15 a. m.—Special aviation weather on 74.7 meters, 4,015 kc., 37.4 meters, 8,030 kc.; 24.9 meters, 12,045 kc.
10 a. m.—Marine weather—Major bulletin on 2,677 meters, 112 kc.; and 18.6 meters, 16,060 kc., followed by ice reports (in season) on 2,677 meters, 112 kc.
11 a. m.—Angot message on 24.9 meters, 12,045 kc.
11.55 a. m.—Time on 2,677 meters, 112 kc.; 74.7 meters, 4,015 kc., 37.4 meters, 8,030 kc.; 24.9 meters, 12,045 kc.
12 (noon).—Navigational warnings on 2,677 meters, 112 kc.
8.15 p. m.—Special aviation weather on 74.7 meters, 4,015 kc.
9.55 p. m.—Time on 2,677 meters, 112 kc., 74.7 meters, 4,015 kc., 37.4 meters, 8,030 kc.; 24.9 meters, 12,045 kc.
10 p. m.—Marine weather—Major bulletin, followed by ice reports (in season) and navigational warnings on 8,328 meters, 36 kc. (this wave length is discontinued at 11 p. m.), and 2,677 meters, 112 kc.
11 p. m.—Angot message on 74.7 meters, 4,015 kc.
All times given are eastern standard. Time, weather, and navigational warnings are sent on a. c. w.

Beginning in 1920, a Navy station located in Anacostia, D.C., NOF, began broadcasting occasional entertainment programs. After installing a vacuum tube transmitter, NAA soon followed with a limited schedule of its own. On May 30, 1922 NAA and NOF jointly broadcast the ceremonies held at the dedication of the Lincoln Memorial, which was the first time that two stations simultaneously transmitted the same program.

In late 1922 it was decided that NOF would focus on experimental work, and effective January 3, 1923 all of its former broadcasts were transferred to NAA. A special 1.5 kilowatt transmitter had been built at Anacostia for the new operation, and an announcement at the time described the programming that would be now be carried over NAA:

"The broadcasting service of NOF has been taken over by station NAA, United States Navy Department, Arlington, or Radio, Virginia. In addition to the transmission of time signals, news items, crop and market reports, weather forecasts, naval business, communications for the Signal Corps and speeches of celebrities, which NAA has been broadcasting, there will be serviced by NAA the concerts of the Marine and Navy Bands, and educational information originating with the Public Health Service, Veterans' Bureau, Children's Bureau, Bureau of Education and Department of Commerce. NAA operates on 710 meters [422 kHz], Eastern Standard Time. The Marine Band Concerts are scheduled for Mondays at 4:30 P. M. and Wednesdays at 8:30 P. M. and the Navy Band Concerts for Fridays at 8:30 P. M."

The "broadcasting boom" of 1922 resulted in a tremendous increase, to over 500, in the number of private radio broadcasting stations operating in the United States. During this developmental period there was an ongoing search for innovative programming, and a number of stations began picking up NAA's twice-a-day longwave time signal transmissions, at noon and 10 p. m. Eastern time, and rebroadcasting them for their local audiences.

Effective May 15, 1923 the Department of Commerce, which regulated civilian radio in the United States from late 1912 until the mid-1920s, announced that there would be a major expansion in the number of frequencies made available for broadcasting. As part of this allocation NAA was assigned exclusive use of 690 kHz, which meant persons who didn't have radios that tuned to NAA's longwave frequencies could now pick up the station on standard receivers.

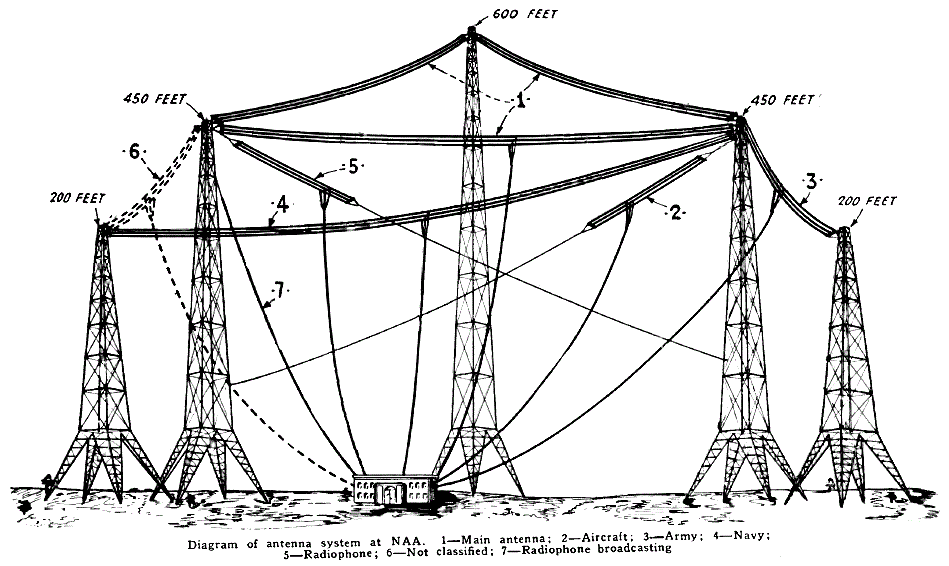
NAA antenna structure configuration (1923)

By 1923, NAA had six transmitters in operation, providing, in addition to time signals and military communication, weather reports and navigational warnings. Station listings from 1926 to 1936 report that the NAA's transmitter on 690 kHz was rated at 1,000 watts. Over the years NAA eliminated its entertainment broadcasts, and the time signal broadcasts on 690 kHz were ended in 1936. After this time signals continued to be sent, most commonly on a longwave frequency of 113 kHz and the shortwave frequency of 9.425 MHz. In the mid-1930s NAA was paired with NSS in Annapolis, Maryland to make joint transmissions, with both stations automatically controlled by the Washington observatory.

=== Decommission ===
By the late 1930s many of the activities conducted at NAA had been transferred to other sites, and it was decided that the Arlington operations were no longer needed. In anticipation of the shutdown, in 1938 three new 600-foot towers, similar in design to the main NAA towers, were erected for NSS at Annapolis. There were also plans to build a new airport near the NAA site, which opened in 1941 as National Airport, so it was agreed that the NAA radio towers would be torn down because they posed a hazard to aircraft.

In preparation for the decommissioning, transfers were made of transmitting equipment to NSS Annapolis and receiving equipment to NSS Cheltenham, Maryland. In January 1941 bids were solicited for tearing down the "three sisters" towers. The contract to raze the towers was awarded to the Long Island Machinery & Equipment Company, Inc., whose winning bid was only $1. The demolition was completed that summer, ending nearly 30 years that NAA had been at the site. Beginning in 1945, WWV, a National Bureau of Standards station in nearby Greenbelt, Maryland, became the primary station broadcasting time signals in the United States. The NAA transmitter building and the original NAA administrative building at 701 Courthouse Rd in Arlington are still in use by the Navy for administrative functions unrelated to radio.
