= Lists of radio stations =

This article is a list containing lists of radio stations.

== General ==
=== By continent ===
- Africa
- Americas
- North America
- South America
- Asia
- Europe
- Oceania

=== By country ===
- Australia
- Bangladesh
- Canada
- Egypt
- Ghana
- Greece
- Nigeria
- Paraguay
- Sweden
- United Kingdom
- United States
- Zimbabwe

=== By language ===
- Chinese
- Danish
- German
- Hindi
- Hungarian
- Irish
- Italian
- Norwegian
- Polish
- Russian

== Europe ==
=== By language ===
- List of Catalan-language radio stations
- List of Danish-language radio stations
- List of German-language radio stations
- List of Hungarian-language radio stations
- List of Irish-language radio stations
- List of Italian-language radio stations
- List of Norwegian-language radio stations
- List of Polish-language radio stations
- List of Russian-language radio stations

=== By country ===
- List of radio stations in Albania
- List of radio stations in Armenia
- List of radio stations in Austria and Liechtenstein
- List of radio stations in Belarus
- List of radio stations in Belgium
- List of radio stations in Bosnia and Herzegovina
- List of radio stations in Bulgaria
- List of radio stations in Croatia
- List of radio stations in Cyprus
- List of radio stations in the Czech Republic
- List of radio stations in Denmark
- List of radio stations in Estonia
- List of radio stations in Finland
- List of radio stations in France
- List of radio stations in Germany
- List of radio stations in Georgia
- List of radio stations in Greece
- List of radio stations in Hungary
- List of radio stations in Iceland
- List of radio stations in the Republic of Ireland
- List of radio stations in Italy
- List of radio stations in Kazakhstan
- List of radio stations in Kosovo
- List of radio stations in Latvia
- List of radio stations in Lithuania
- List of radio stations in Luxembourg
- List of radio stations in Malta
- List of radio stations in Monaco
- List of radio stations in Montenegro
- List of radio stations in the Netherlands
- List of radio stations in North Macedonia
- List of radio stations in Norway
- List of radio stations in Poland
- List of radio stations in Portugal
- List of radio stations in Romania
- List of radio stations in Russia
- List of radio stations in San Marino
- List of radio stations in Serbia
- List of radio stations in Slovakia
- List of radio stations in Slovenia
- List of radio stations in Spain
- List of radio stations in Sweden
- List of radio stations in Switzerland
- List of radio stations in Turkey
- List of radio stations in Ukraine
- List of radio stations in the United Kingdom

=== By city ===
- List of radio stations in Naples
- List of radio stations in Paris
- List of radio stations in Rome
- List of radio stations in Turin
- List of radio stations in Kyiv

== Ghana ==
- List of radio stations in Western Region
- List of radio stations in Eastern Region
- List of radio stations in Central Region
- List of radio stations in Northern Region
- List of radio stations in Greater Accra Region
- List of radio stations in Brong-Ahafo Region
- List of radio stations in Upper East Region
- List of radio stations in Upper West Region
- List of radio stations in Volta Region
- List of radio stations in Ashanti Region

== Oceania ==
- List of radio stations in Australian Capital Territory
- List of radio stations in New South Wales
- List of radio stations in Northern Territory
- List of radio stations in Queensland
- List of radio stations in South Australia
- List of radio stations in Tasmania
- List of radio stations in Victoria
- List of radio stations in Western Australia
- List of early radio broadcast stations in Western Australia
- List of radio stations in Guam
- List of radio stations in Hawaii
- List of radio stations in the Federated States of Micronesia
- List of radio stations in New Zealand
- List of radio stations in Palau

== United States ==
=== By state ===
- List of radio stations in Alabama
- List of radio stations in Alaska
- List of radio stations in Arizona
- List of radio stations in Arkansas
- List of radio stations in California
- List of radio stations in Colorado
- List of radio stations in Connecticut
- List of radio stations in Delaware
- List of radio stations in Florida
- List of radio stations in Georgia (U.S. state)
- List of radio stations in Hawaii
- List of radio stations in Idaho
- List of radio stations in Illinois
- List of radio stations in Indiana
- List of radio stations in Iowa
- List of radio stations in Kansas
- List of radio stations in Kentucky
- List of radio stations in Louisiana
- List of radio stations in Maine
- List of radio stations in Maryland
- List of radio stations in Massachusetts
- List of radio stations in Michigan
- List of radio stations in Minnesota
- List of radio stations in Mississippi
- List of radio stations in Missouri
- List of radio stations in Montana
- List of radio stations in Nebraska
- List of radio stations in Nevada
- List of radio stations in New Hampshire
- List of radio stations in New Jersey
- List of radio stations in New Mexico
- List of radio stations in New York
- List of radio stations in North Carolina
- List of radio stations in North Dakota
- List of radio stations in Ohio
- List of radio stations in Oklahoma
- List of radio stations in Oregon
- List of radio stations in Pennsylvania
- List of radio stations in Rhode Island
- List of radio stations in South Carolina
- List of radio stations in South Dakota
- List of radio stations in Tennessee
- List of radio stations in Texas
- List of radio stations in Utah
- List of radio stations in Vermont
- List of radio stations in Virginia
- List of radio stations in Washington
- List of radio stations in Washington, D.C.
- List of radio stations in West Virginia
- List of radio stations in Wisconsin
- List of radio stations in Wyoming
- List of radio stations in U.S. territories

=== By call sign ===
- AM radio stations (KA–KF)
- AM radio stations (KG–KM)
- AM radio stations (KN–KS)
- AM radio stations (KT–KZ)
- AM radio stations (WA–WF)
- AM radio stations (WG–WM)
- AM radio stations (WN–WS)
- AM radio stations (WT–WZ)
- FM radio stations (KA–KC)
- FM radio stations (KD–KF)
- FM radio stations (KG–KJ)
- FM radio stations (KK–KM)
- FM radio stations (KN–KP)
- FM radio stations (KQ–KS)
- FM radio stations (KT–KV)
- FM radio stations (KW–KZ)
- FM radio stations (WA–WC)
- FM radio stations (WD–WF)
- FM radio stations (WG–WJ)
- FM radio stations (WK–WM)
- FM radio stations (WN–WP)
- FM radio stations (WQ–WS)
- FM radio stations (WT–WV)
- FM radio stations (WW–WZ)

=== Other ===
- List of 50 kW AM radio stations in the United States
- List of Air1 stations
- List of college radio stations in the United States
- List of community radio stations in the United States
- List of jazz radio stations in the United States
- List of non-profit radio stations in the United States
- List of NPR stations
- List of Pacifica Radio stations and affiliates
- List of radio stations owned by Cumulus Media
- List of radio stations owned by Townsquare Media
- List of Spanish Broadcasting System radio stations
- List of United States radio networks
- List of unlicensed high school radio stations

== See also ==
- List of radio broadcast networks
