= List of European radio stations =

This is a list of radio stations in Europe.

== Pan-European radio networks ==
=== European commercial radio networks ===
- Bauer Media Group
  - United Kingdom (Absolute Radio, Greatest Hits Radio, Jazz FM, Hits Radio, KISS, Planet Rock, Magic, Kerrang! Radio and Heat Radio)
  - Ireland (Newstalk, Today FM, 98FM, SPIN 1038, SPIN South West)
  - Norway (Radio Norge, Radio Rock, NRJ Norway, Topp 40, Vinyl, P24-7 HOT Country, P24-7 MIX, P24-7 FUN, P24-7 KOS)
  - Denmark (Nova, Radio Soft, The Voice, Radio 100, Pop FM, MyRock, Flow, Mix7, Pop FM 80'er, Pop FM 90'er)
  - Sweden (Mix Megapol, Rock Klassiker, NRJ Sweden, Radio Nostalgie Sweden)
  - Finland (Radio Nova, Iskelma, Radio City, NRJ Finland, Radio Nostalgie Finland, Basso, Suomi Rock, Suomi Rap, Top 51, Kasari, Radio Pooki, Radio Classic, local stations (Radio 957, Radio Pori, Auran Aallot, Radio Mega))
  - Poland (RMF FM, RMF MAXX, RMF Classic, RMF24)
  - Slovakia (Radio Expres, Europa 2 Slovakia, Radio Melody, Radio Rock)
  - Portugal (Radio Comercial, M80 Radio, Cidade FM, Batida FM, Smooth FM)
- NRJ Group
  - NRJ / Energy – in France, Germany, Switzerland, Austria, Belgium, Norway, Sweden, Finland, Bulgaria and Egypt
  - Nostalgie – in France, Germany, Switzerland, Austria, Belgium, The Netherlands, Sweden, Finland, Lebanon, Guinea and Côte d'Ivoire
- Virgin Radio – in Canada, UK, Switzerland, Italy, Romania, Turkey, Lebanon, UAE and Oman
- RTL Group
  - RTL Radio Deutschland (RTL Radio (Germany (DAB+) and Luxembourg (DAB+/FM)), Toggo Radio (DAB+) and local and regional radio stations (DAB+/FM))
  - RTL Lëtzebuerg (RTL Radio Lёtzebuerg, RTL Today Radio, Eldoradio, L'essentiel Radio) (DAB+/FM)
  - M6 Group France (48,26%) (RTL, RTL2, Fun Radio) (DAB+/FM)
  - Atresmedia Spain (15,1%) (Onda Cero (also on AM), Europa FM, Melodia FM) (DAB+/FM)
- TV3 Group
  - Estonia (Star FM, Power Hit Radio, Star FM Eesti, Star FM+ (before 30 November 2026, FM only)) (DAB+/FM)
  - Latvia (Star FM, Top Radio, Radio 3 (planned))
  - Lithuania (Radio 3, Power Hit Radio)
- Bolloré:
  - Viaplay Group (Canal+ 29,33%, PPF Group 29,29%, Nordea 12,02%)
    - Viaplay Radio (Rix FM (DAB+/FM), Star FM (DAB+/FM), Bandit Rock (DAB+/FM), Lugna Favoriter (DAB+/FM), Skargardsradion (DAB+/FM), Go Country (DAB+/FM), Bandit Classic Rock, Disco 54, Hitmix 90’s, Power Hit Radio, Retro FM, RIX FM Fresh, Sonic Radio, Topp 40 (FM in Malmo), Rock FM (FM in Malmo))
    - P4 Group (P4 Lyden av Norge, P5 Hits, P6 Rock, P7 Klem, P8 Pop, P9 Retro, P10 Country, P11 Dance, P12 Hitmix)
  - Lagardère Group (Louis Hachette Group 66,53%)
    - Radio stations in France (Europe 1, Europe 2, RFM)
  - MediaForEurope (Vivendi 19,8%)
    - Radio Stations in Italy (Radio Monte Carlo, R101, Radio 105 Network, Virgin Radio Italy, Radio Subasio)
  - PRISA (Vivendi 11,9%)
    - Radio Stations in Spain (Cadena SER (also on AM), Los 40, Cadena Dial, Radiole)
- Czech Media Invest
  - Czech Republic (Evropa 2, Frekvence 1, Dance Radio, Radio Bonton)
  - Romania (Europa FM, Virgin Radio Romania, Tomorrowland One World Radio, Smart FM)
- Antenna Group
  - Greece (Easy FM, Rythmos FM)
  - Cyprus (Ant1 Radio)
  - Romania (Kiss FM, Magic FM, One FM, Rock FM)
  - Moldova (Kiss FM)
- United Group
  - Radio Nova (Serbia) (Internet only)
  - Radio stations in Bulgaria (Nova News, The Voice, Magic FM, Radio Vitosha, Radio Veselina)
  - Alpha Radio (Greece)
  - Alpha Radio (Cyprus)
- DPG Media
  - The Netherlands (Joe, QMusic)
  - Belgium (Top, Top2, Willy, Bel RTL, Contact, Contact Max, Nostalgie, Nostalgie+, Cherie FM, Les Indies, BXFM, Inside Radio, Maximum, Mint)
- News UK
  - Radio GB (TalkSport (DAB+ and AM), TalkSport 2, TalkRadio, Times Radio, Virgin Radio UK)
  - Onic (Dublin (Dublin's Q102 (DAB+ and FM) and FM104), Cork (Cork's 96FM and C103), Live95 Limerick, LMFM Drogheda, U105 Belfast (NI, UK (DAB+ and FM)), Onic thematical DAB+ channels in Ireland)
- Central European Media Enterprises (PPF Group)
  - Radio stations in Bulgaria (bTV Radio, N-JOY, Z-Rock, Classic FM, Jazz FM)
- Radio S1 – in Serbia, Bosnia and Herzegovina (Saraevo) and Montenegro
- Radio S3 - in Serbia and Montenegro (Podgorica and Budva)
- TDI Radio - in Serbia and Montenegro
- Play Radio – in Serbia and Montenegro
- Lola Radio - in Serbia and Montenegro (Podgorica)
- Antenne Bayern Group
  - Germany (Antenne Bayern, Rock Antenne, Antenne NRW, Oldie Antenne)
  - Austria (Rock Antenne Österreich)
- Klassik Radio – in Germany and Austria
- Russian radio groups and stations:
  - Gazprom-Media
    - Avtoradio – Russia, Moldova (Cishinau), Armenia (Yerevan), Kyrgyzstan (Bishkek and Naryn), Tajikistan (Dushanbe)
    - Yumor FM – Russia, Belarus and Kazakhstan
    - Relax FM - Kazakhstan (Baikonur)
  - SAFMAR Media (Krutoy Media)
    - Love Radio – in Russia, Moldova (FM-network and Cishinau DAB+), Kazakhstan, Kyrgyzstan and Tajikistan (Dushanbe and Khujand)
    - Radio Dacha – in Russia and Kazakhstan
    - Radio Shanson – in Russia, Belarus (Miensk and Viciebsk) and Armenia (Yerevan)
  - European Media Group
    - Europa Plus – Russia, Spain (DAB+ on Barcelona, Tarragona and Reus), Belarus (Miensk, Połacak and Viciebsk), Ukraine (Kyiv, Dnipro, Odesa), Moldova (Cishinau), Armenia (Yerevan), UAE (Dubai), Kyrgyzstan, Uzbekistan and Tajikistan (Dushanbe)
    - Retro FM – Russia, Latvia (Riga, Liepaja, Rezekne and Daugavpils), Belarus (Miensk and Połacak), Moldova (Cishinau FM/DAB+), Kazakhstan and Kyrgyzstan
    - Novoe Radio – Russia, Belarus (Viciebsk, Vorša and Babrujsk), Moldova (FM-network and Cishinau DAB+) and Tajikistan (Dushanbe and Khujand)
  - Russian Media Group
    - Russkoe Radio – Russia, Belarus (Miensk, Babrujsk and Mahilou), Cyprus (Nicosia, Paphos, Limassol and Larnaca), Armenia (Yerevan, Gavar, Martuni), Kazakhstan and Mongolia (Ulaanbaatar)
    - Hit FM – Russia, Kazakhstan and Kyrgyzstan
    - Radio Monte Carlo – Russia, Limassol (Cyprus), Almaty (Kazakhstan) and Bishkek (Kyrgyzstan)
  - Radio Record – in Russia, Moldova (Cishinau (FM and DAB+) and Bălți) and Kyrgyzstan (Bishkek, Osh, Cholpon-Ata)
  - Radio MIR – in Russia, Belarus, Yerevan (Armenia), Kazakhstan and Kyrgyzstan
  - Radio Iskatel - in Bishkek (Kyrgyzstan)
  - Fon Music - in Bishkek, Kara-Balta and Karakol (Kyrgyzstan)
  - Vesti FM - in Bishkek (Kyrgyzstan)
  - Radio Rossii - in Baikonur (Kazakhstan) and Balykchy (Kyrgyzstan)
  - Radio Zvezda (Radio 201) - in Dushanbe (Tajikistan)
  - Radio Sputnik - in various countries, territories and languages

=== Religious broadcasters ===
- Adventist World Radio – on FM, DAB+ and AM
- Radio Maria – Albania, Austria (FM and DAB+), Belarus (Internet), Belgium (Flanders) (DAB+), Bosnia and Herzegovina, Croatia, France (DAB+), Germany (Radio Horeb) (FM and DAB+), Hungary, Ireland (DAB+), Italy (+German in South Tirol) (FM and DAB+), Kosovo, Latvia, Lithuania, Malta (FM and DAB+), Monaco (FM and DAB+), North Macedonia (Strumica), Portugal, Romania (in Romanian and Hungarian), Serbia (in Serbian and Hungarian), Slovakia (FM in Hungarian, DAB+ in Slovak), Spain (FM and DAB+), Switzerland (DAB+ in German and French), The Netherlands (DAB+), United Kingdom (DAB+) Ukraine (FM, DAB+ and UKV)).
- Trans World Radio – Monaco 1467 AM, Estonia 1035 AM, Armenia (1350 AM and 1377 AM) and Kyrgyzstan (612 AM & 1467 AM).
- Vatican Radio - Shortwaves for Belarus and Ukraine, retranslation in partnership radio stations.
- Evangeliums-Rundfunk (ERF) – in Germany, Austria, Switzerland
- Radios chrétiennes francophones (RCF) – in France, Belgium and Switzerland
- European Gospel Radio – on MW and SW

=== Others ===
- Euranet – European radio network
- BBC World Service - on DAB+ in United Kingdom, Iceland (Reykjavik), The Netherlands, Belgium (Flanders), Denmark, Italy and Malta. On FM in Reykjavik 94.5 FM, Berlin 94.8 FM, Tirana 103.9 FM, Prishtina 98.6 FM, Riga 100.5 FM and Vilnius 95.5 FM. On AM in Cyprus (639 AM, with BBC News Arabic & 720 AM, with BBC News Arabic and BBC News Persian), Armenia (1395 AM, only BBC News Persian), Oman (702 AM, only BBC News Persian & 1413 AM, with BBC News Afghanistan) and Tajikistan (1296 AM, only BBC News Persian)
- RFI Monde - on DAB+ in France, Luxembourg, Mainz and Malta. On FM in Paris 89.0 FM, Bilbao 97.2 FM, Barcelona 105.3 FM, Berlin 96.7 FM, Praha 99.3 FM, Tirana 102.0 FM, Prishtina 101.0 FM, Tbilisi 102.9 FM and Yerevan 102.4 FM. RFI Romania on Bucharest 93.5 FM, Craiova 94.0 FM, Timisoara 96.9 FM, Cluj-Napoca 91.7 FM, Sibiu 89.0 FM, Iasi 97.9 FM and Chișinău (Moldova) 107.3 FM. Linear radio stations in all languages services (except English, Ukrainian, Armenian, Persian and Russian).
- Radio Free Europe/Radio Liberty – linear radio stations for Russia (Radio Svoboda), Iran (Radio Farda) and Afghanistan (Radio Azadi). Radio Svoboda on RBWI 1386 AM (18:30-21:30 UTC) and Ziniu Radijas (22:00-5:00 Vilnius time) in Lithuania. Radio Farda on 1395 AM (15:00-17:00 UTC), 1548 AM (0:00-3:00 UTC) and shortwave (0-24).

== Lists of stations ==
=== By language ===
- List of Catalan-language radio stations
- List of Danish-language radio stations
- List of German-language radio stations
- List of Hungarian-language radio stations
- List of Irish-language radio stations
- List of Italian-language radio stations
- List of Norwegian-language radio stations
- List of Polish-language radio stations
- List of Russian-language radio stations

=== By country ===
- List of radio stations in Albania
- List of radio stations in Armenia
- List of radio stations in Austria and Liechtenstein
- List of radio stations in Belarus
- List of radio stations in Belgium
- List of radio stations in Bosnia and Herzegovina
- List of radio stations in Bulgaria
- List of radio stations in Croatia
- List of radio stations in Cyprus
- List of radio stations in the Czech Republic
- List of radio stations in Denmark
- List of radio stations in Estonia
- List of radio stations in Finland
- List of radio stations in France
- List of radio stations in Germany
- List of radio stations in Georgia
- List of radio stations in Greece
- List of radio stations in Hungary
- List of radio stations in Iceland
- List of radio stations in the Republic of Ireland
- List of radio stations in Italy
- List of radio stations in Kazakhstan
- List of radio stations in Kosovo
- List of radio stations in Latvia
- List of radio stations in Lithuania
- List of radio stations in Luxembourg
- List of radio stations in Malta
- List of radio stations in Monaco
- List of radio stations in Montenegro
- List of radio stations in the Netherlands
- List of radio stations in North Macedonia
- List of radio stations in Norway
- List of radio stations in Poland
- List of radio stations in Portugal
- List of radio stations in Romania
- List of radio stations in Russia
- List of radio stations in San Marino
- List of radio stations in Serbia
- List of radio stations in Slovakia
- List of radio stations in Slovenia
- List of radio stations in Spain
- List of radio stations in Sweden
- List of radio stations in Switzerland
- List of radio stations in Turkey
- List of radio stations in Ukraine
- List of radio stations in the United Kingdom

=== By city ===
- List of radio stations in Naples
- List of radio stations in Paris
- List of radio stations in Rome
- List of radio stations in Turin
- List of radio stations in Kyiv

== See also ==
- List of radio stations in Africa
- List of radio stations in the Americas
- List of radio stations in Asia
- Lists of radio stations in Oceania
