= List of radio broadcast networks =

This is a list of radio broadcast networks.

== By country ==
=== Australia ===
Public Networks

- Australian Broadcasting Corporation
  - ABC Local Radio
  - ABC Radio National
  - ABC Classic
  - Triple J
  - ABC NewsRadio
- Special Broadcasting Service
  - SBS Radio
  - SBS Arabic
  - SBS PopAsia
  - SBS South Asian

Commercial Networks

- Ace Radio
- ARN
  - ARN Regional
  - KIIS Network
  - Pure Gold Network
- Capital Radio Network
  - Forever Classic
  - Capital Hit Network
- Tapt Media
  - News Talk
  - Classic Hits
- Nova Entertainment
  - Nova
  - Smooth
- Southern Cross Austereo
  - Hit
  - Triple M
- Rebel Media
  - Rebel FM
  - The Breeze
- Resonate Broadcasting
- Sports Entertainment Network
  - Sports Entertainment Network
- Super Radio Network

=== Brazil ===
- Brazil Communication Company
  - Rádio Nacional
  - Radio Mechanic
- Jovem Pan News
- Jovem Pan FM
- CBN
- Radio Bandeirantes
- BandNews FM
- Mix FM
- Massa FM
- Band FM
- Native FM

=== Canada ===
- Canadian Broadcasting Corporation
  - CBC Radio One
  - CBC Radio 2
  - CBC Radio 3
  - Première Chaîne
  - Espace musique
  - Bande à part
- MBC Radio
- Corus Radio Network
- Énergie
- Rouge FM
- Rythme FM
- Sportsnet Radio
- TSN Radio

Defunct

- CNR Radio Network (1923-1933)
- Canadian Pacific Radio (1930-1935)
- Canadian Radio Broadcasting Commission (1932-1936)
- Broadcasting Corporation of Newfoundland (1939-1949)
- Dominion Network (1944-1962)
- Trans-Canada Network (1944-1962)
- CKO (1977-1989)
- Pelmorex Radio Network (1990-1999)
- The Team (2001-2002)
- Aboriginal Voices Radio Network (2002-2016)

=== China ===
- China National Radio
- China Radio International
- Shanghai Media Group

=== India ===
- BBC Hindi
- All India Radio (AIR)
- Vividh Bharati
- Radio City (91.1)
- Big FM (92.7)
- Radio One (94.3)
- Radio Mirchi (98.3)
- Red FM (93.5)
- Suryan FM (93.5)
- Hello FM (106.4)

=== Indonesia ===
- Radio Republik Indonesia (RRI)
- Prambors
- Delta FM
- I-Radio
- Trax FM
- Gen FM
- Elshinta Radio
- MNC Trijaya
- RDI
- Global Radio
- Oz Radio
- Sonora FM
- Hard Rock FM

=== Ireland ===
- RTÉ Radio 1
- RTÉ 2fm
- RTÉ lyric fm
- RTÉ Raidió na Gaeltachta
- Today FM

=== Japan ===
- NHK Radio 1
- JRN
- NRN
- JFN
- JFL
- MegaNet

=== South Korea ===
- Korean Broadcasting System
- Munhwa Broadcasting Corporation
- Seoul Broadcasting System

=== New Zealand ===
Almost all radio stations in New Zealand are part of a radio network, and most are network-owned.

- Radio New Zealand (state-owned, non-commercial)
  - Radio New Zealand Concert
  - Radio New Zealand National
- MediaWorks Radio (commercial network)
  - George FM
  - Mai FM
  - More FM (local programming in most markets between 6am and 1pm)
  - Radio Live
  - The Breeze (local in Wellington and Christchurch)
  - The Edge FM
  - The Rock
  - The Sound
  - Magic
- New Zealand Media and Entertainment (formerly The Radio Network; commercial network)
  - Coast
  - Flava
  - Newstalk ZB
  - Radio Hauraki
  - Radio Sport
  - The Hits (local breakfast in some markets, local 9am – 3pm in other markets)
  - ZM
- Rhema Group
  - Life FM
  - New Zealand's Rhema
  - Southern Star

=== Pakistan ===
- Radio Pakistan
- Hum FM
- City FM 89
- FM 98
- FM 103

=== Philippines ===
- ABS-CBN Corporation
- Advanced Media Broadcasting System
- Aliw Broadcasting Corporation
- Associated Broadcasting Company
- Audiovisual Communicators, Inc.
- Blockbuster Broadcasting System
- Bombo Radyo Philippines
- Brainstone Broadcasting Inc.
- Catholic Media Network
- Christian Era Broadcasting Service
- Delta Broadcasting System, Inc.
- Eagle Broadcasting Corporation
- Far East Broadcasting Company
- FBS Radio Network
- GMA Network
- Intercontinental Broadcasting Corporation
- Manila Broadcasting Company
- Mareco Broadcasting Network
- Nation Broadcasting Corporation
- Palawan Broadcasting Corporation
- Philippine Broadcasting Service
- Progressive Broadcasting Corporation
- Quest Broadcasting Inc.
- Radio Mindanao Network
- Radio Philippines Network
- Rajah Broadcasting Network
- Raven Broadcasting Corporation
- Real Radio Network Inc.
- Sonshine Media Network International
- Southern Broadcasting Network
- ZOE Broadcasting Network

=== Poland ===
- Public:
  - Polskie Radio
    - Program 1 (Jedynka) - (news, current affairs, easy listening music, focused at listeners aged 40–64) - AM, FM, DAB+ and the internet
    - Program 2 (Dwójka) - (Classical music, drama, comedy, literature) - FM, DAB+ and the internet
    - Program 3 (Trójka) - (Rock, alternative, Middle of the Road, focused at listeners aged 25–49) - FM, DAB+ and the internet
    - Program 4 (Czwórka) - (Dance, R&B, Reggae, Rap, Soul, focused at listeners aged 15–29) - FM, DAB+ and the internet
    - Polskie Radio Dla Zagranicy - (external service in English, Ukrainian, Russian, Belarusian) - AM, FM, DAB+, satellite and the internet
- Non-commercial:
  - Radio Maryja (catholic)
- Commercial:
  - Bauer Media Group:
    - RMF FM - hot adult contemporary radio (Target Demographic 18-44) (nationwide)
  - Eurozet:
    - Radio Zet - hot adult contemporary radio (Target Demographic 21-49) (nationwide)
    - Antyradio - rock and metal music (3 local stations)
  - Time company:
    - Radio Eska - contemporary hit radio (Target Demographic 13-29) (40 local stations)
    - Eska Rock - mainly rock music (local station broadcasting in Warsaw)
    - VOX FM - mostly Disco Polo
  - Agora company:
    - TOK FM - rolling news, talk, current affairs
    - Rock Radio - rock music (Target Demographic 18-39) (7 local stations)
  - Other:
    - Radio Kolor - local station in Warsaw
    - Radio Alfa - local station in Kraków
    - and over 100 other local stations

=== Romania ===
- Public:
  - Radio România Actualități
  - Radio România Muzical
  - Radio Antena Satelor
  - Radio România Cultural
  - Radio Romania International Commercial: Pro FM Europa FM Kiss FM Virgin Radio Romania

=== United Kingdom ===
- British Broadcasting Corporation
  - BBC Radio
    - BBC Radio 1
    - BBC Radio 1Xtra
    - BBC Radio 2
    - BBC Radio 3
    - BBC Radio 4
    - BBC Radio 4 Extra
    - BBC Radio 5 Live
    - BBC Radio 5 Sports Extra
    - BBC Radio 6 Music
    - BBC Asian Network
- Bauer Radio
  - Absolute Radio Network
  - Greatest Hits Radio
  - Hits Radio
  - Kiss
  - Magic
- Global Media & Entertainment
  - Gold Radio
  - Capital Network
  - Heart Network
  - Smooth Radio Network
  - Radio X
- News Broadcasting
  - talkSPORT
  - Virgin Radio UK
- Nation Radio UK

=== International ===
- United Nations Radio

== See also ==
- List of radio stations
- Broadcast network
- Radio network
