= Radio network =

Type of audio-only broadcast network

A radio network is a system that distributes radio signals to multiple receivers or enables two-way communication between stations and mobile units. Worldwide, radio networks include broadcast networks, such as BBC Radio in the United Kingdom and NPR in the United States, which transmit one-to-many signals for news, entertainment, and public information; two-way radio networks, used by police, fire services, taxicabs, and delivery fleets for operational communication; and cellular networks, such as Verizon, Vodafone, and China Mobile, which provide mobile telephony and data services using frequency or time division duplexing. While all rely on radio-frequency technology like transmitters, receivers, and antennas, their network architectures, protocols, and regulatory frameworks differ substantially across applications and regions.

The two-way type of radio network shares many of the same technologies and components as the broadcast-type radio network but is generally set up with fixed broadcast points (transmitters) with co-located receivers and mobile receivers/transmitters or transceivers. In this way both the fixed and mobile radio units can communicate with each other over broad geographic regions ranging in size from small single cities to entire states/provinces or countries. There are many ways in which multiple fixed transmit/receive sites can be interconnected to achieve the range of coverage required by the jurisdiction or authority implementing the system: conventional wireless links in numerous frequency bands, fibre-optic links, or microwave links. In all of these cases the signals are typically backhauled to a central switch of some type where the radio message is processed and resent (repeated) to all transmitter sites where it is required to be heard.

In contemporary two-way radio systems, a concept called trunking is commonly used to achieve better efficiency of radio spectrum use. It provides a very wide range of coverage, with no switching of channels required by the mobile radio user as it roams throughout the system coverage. Trunking of two-way radio is identical to the concept used for cellular phone systems where each fixed and mobile radio is specifically identified to the system controller and its operation is switched by the controller.

== Broadcasting networks ==
The broadcast type of radio network is a network system which distributes radio programming to multiple stations simultaneously, or slightly delayed, for the purpose of extending total coverage beyond the limits of a single broadcast signal. The resulting expanded audience for radio programming or information essentially applies the benefits of mass-production to the broadcasting enterprise. A radio network has two sales departments, one to package and sell programs to radio stations, and one to sell the audience of those programs to advertisers.

Most radio networks also produce much of their programming. Originally, radio networks owned some or all of the stations that broadcast the network's radio format programming. Presently however, there are many networks that do not own any stations and only produce and/or distribute programming. Similarly station ownership does not always indicate network affiliation. A company might own stations in several different markets and purchase programming from a variety of networks.

Radio networks rose rapidly with the growth of regular broadcasting of radio to home listeners in the 1920s. This growth took various paths in different places. In Britain the BBC was developed with public funding, in the form of a broadcast receiver license, and a broadcasting monopoly in its early decades. In contrast, in the United States various competing commercial broadcasting networks arose funded by advertising revenue. In that instance, the same corporation that owned or operated the network often manufactured and marketed the listener's radio.

Major technical challenges to be overcome when distributing programs over long distances are maintaining signal quality and managing the number of switching/relay points in the signal chain. Early on, programs were sent to remote stations (either owned or affiliated) by various methods, including leased telephone lines, pre-recorded gramophone records and audio tape. The world's first all-radio, non-wireline network was claimed to be the Rural Radio Network, a group of six upstate New York FM stations that began operation in June 1948. Terrestrial microwave relay, a technology later introduced to link stations, has been largely supplanted by coaxial cable, fiber, and satellite, which usually offer superior cost-benefit ratios. Many early radio networks evolved into television networks.

== See also ==
- List of radio broadcast networks
- Lists of radio stations
