= Anna Karsten =

Polish travel blogger

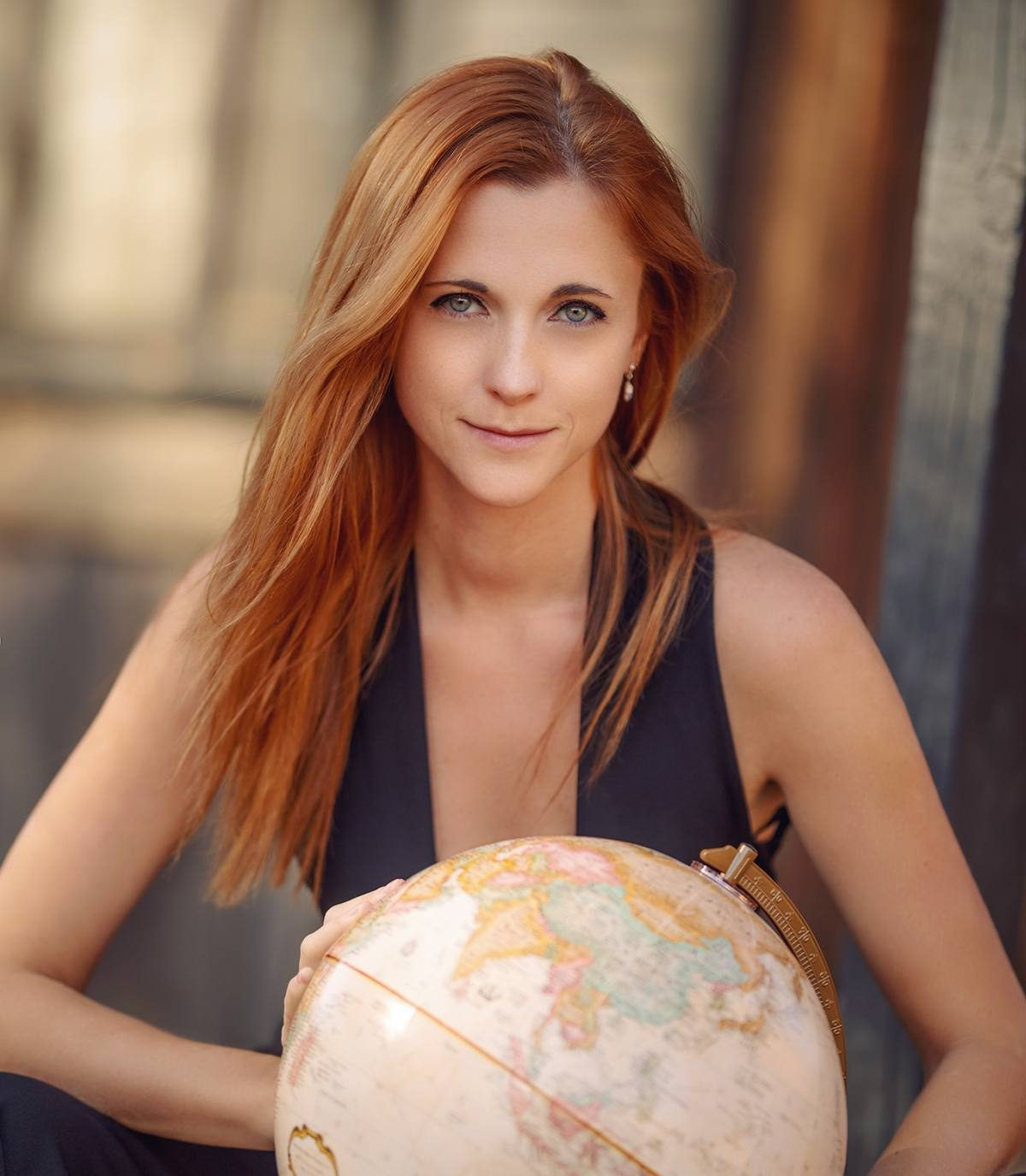
- Born: Anna Lysakowska; August 30, 1988 (age 38); Warsaw, Poland
- Education: Nicolaus Copernicus University in Toruń (BA)
- Alma mater: Leiden University
- Occupation: Travel blogger
- Website: www.annaeverywhere.com

Anna Karsten (born August 30, 1988, in Warsaw) is a travel blogger and social media personality. Her work has been featured in the New York Times, Forbes, National Geographic and Travel Channel.

== Early life ==
Karsten was born as Anna Lysakowska and raised in Warsaw, Poland. She began her career in media as a child TV presenter. At the age of 7, she co-hosted episodes of kids programs on TVP2 and Polsat.

== Education ==
In 2009, Karsten graduated with distinction and received a Bachelor of Arts from Nicolaus Copernicus University in Toruń. Karsten then moved to London and studied at University College London.

During her postgraduate studies at Leiden University in 2014, she published her research on the politics of abortion in Mexico (978-3659527661).

== Career ==
In 2013, Karsten launched her travel blog, Anna Everywhere in order to document her journeys around the world.

She has appeared on television and radio in several countries (also as Anna Lysakowska) including TVN24, Azteca, Polskie Radio Program IV.

As a speaker, Anna has appeared at Travel Industry Exchange, Traverse, and Travelcon.

She has been featured, quoted or written about in dozens of publications including New York Times, The Huffington Post, The Daily Telegraph, Forbes, Matador Network, News.com.au, Orbitz, TripAdvisor, Gazeta Wyborcza, and BuzzFeed.

Anna has also been named the most popular travel blogger from Poland on Instagram by the National Geographic Traveler.
