= Outline of radio =

Overview of and topical guide to radio

The following outline is provided as an overview of and topical guide to radio:

Radio – transmission of signals by modulation of electromagnetic waves with frequencies below those of visible light. Electromagnetic radiation travels by means of oscillating electromagnetic fields that pass through the air and the vacuum of space. Information is carried by systematically changing (modulating) some property of the radiated waves, such as amplitude, frequency, phase, or pulse width. When radio waves pass an electrical conductor, the oscillating fields induce an alternating current in the conductor. This can be detected and transformed into sound or other signals that carry information.

== Descriptions of radio ==
- Broadcasting
- Communication
  - Wireless communication
- Transmitter
- Radio receiver
- Radio broadcasting

== Applications ==
- Amateur radio
- Direction finding
- Radio broadcasting
  - AM broadcasting
  - FM broadcasting
  - Shortwave broadcasting
- Radar
- Radio astronomy
- Radio navigation
- Radiotelephone
- Satellite radio
- Software-defined radio
- Two-way radio (Aviation, Land-based commercial, Government, Marine)
  - Mission critical communication TETRA and P25
- Wireless power transfer

== Radio broadcasting ==
- Disc jockey
- Radio documentary
- Radio format
- Radio personality
- Radio programming
- Campus radio
- Commercial radio
- Community radio
- International broadcasting
- Internet radio
- Music radio
- Pirate radio
- Public radio

== History of radio ==
History of radio

- Invention of radio
- Wireless telegraphy
- Spark-gap transmitter
- Alexanderson alternator
- Antique radio
- Coherer
- Continuous wave
- Crystal radio
- Vacuum tube
- Amplitude modulation
- Old-time radio
- Radioteletype
- Table of years in radio (events by year)
- Timeline of radio

== Radio science ==
Radio science

- Antenna (radio)
- Carrier current
- Electromagnetic radiation
- Radio frequency (electricity and electromagnetic waves)
- Radio spectrum (electromagnetic waves)
- Radio propagation
- Receiver (radio)
- Transmitter
- Types of radio emissions

== Radio technology ==
- Antenna matching unit
- Batteryless radio
- Digital radio
- DTV radio
- Preselector
- Radio frequency power amplifier
- Radio software
- Shortwave radio receiver
- Superheterodyne receiver
- Tuner (radio)
- TV radio

== Radio stations ==
- Radio communication station
- lists of radio stations
  - By continent
  - By country
  - By language

== Persons influential in the field of radio ==
- Michael Faraday (predictions)
- James Clerk Maxwell (theoretical work)
- Heinrich Rudolf Hertz (experimental demonstrations)
- Oliver Lodge (techniques for transmitting and receiving radio waves)
- Guglielmo Marconi (adapted radio waves for use in signalling)
- Reginald Fessenden (developed amplitude modulation (AM) radio and first voice transmission)
- Edwin Howard Armstrong (developed frequency modulation (FM) )

== Alternatives ==
- Cable FM
- Free-space optical communication (FSO)
- Internet radio

== Other ==
- List of radios – List of specific models of radios
- Years in radio

== See also ==
- Category:Radio by country
