= List of radio stations in Aruba =

The following radio stations are located in and transmitted from Oranjestad, Aruba. These are 16 radio stations in Oranjestad, Aruba

== FM Stations ==
Frequency	Station	Language	Format	Covered Location
88.1 MHz	Mega 88FM	Dutch	Adult Contemporary/Top 40	Oranjestad, Aruba
88.9 MHz	Bo Guia 88.9 FM	English	Tropical	Oranjestad, Aruba
89.9 MHz	Canal 90 FM	Papiamento	Adult Contemporary, Top 40	Oranjestad, Aruba
90.7 MHz	Caliente 90.7	Spanish	Tropical	Oranjestad, Aruba
91.5 MHz	Fire FM 91.5	Spanish	Tropical	Oranjestad, Aruba
92.3 MHz	Latina FM 92.3	Spanish	Pop Latin	Oranjestad, Aruba
94.1 MHz	Hit 94 FM	Dutch/English	Adult Contemporary/Top 40	Oranjestad, Aruba
96.5 MHz	Magic 96.5 FM	Papiamento, English	Top 40, Pop, Variety	Oranjestad, Aruba
97.9 MHz	Easy FM 97.9	English	Adult Contemporary	Oranjestad, Aruba
98.9 MHz	Cool FM 98.9	Papiamento	Adult Contemporary/Pop	Oranjestad, Aruba
99.9 MHz	GFM - Galactica FM	English	Adult Contemporary/Top 40	Oranjestad, Aruba
100.9 MHz	Hits 100.9 FM	Papiamento	Top 40/Pop, Christian Rock	Oranjestad, Aruba
101.7 MHz	Power 101.7	Papiamento	Jam/Smooth Jazz	Oranjestad, Aruba
102.7 MHz	XFM 102.7	Papiamento/ Dutch/ Spanish/ English	Urban	Oranjestad, Aruba
103.5 MHz	Hot 103.5	English	Soca, Caribbean, Adult Contemporary	San Nicolaas, Aruba
104.3 MHz	Fresh 104.3	Dutch	Adult Contemporary, Rock	Oranjestad, Aruba
107.5 MHz	Wave Fm 107.5	English	Top 40/Pop	Oranjestad, Aruba

== See also ==
- Lists of radio stations in Africa
- Lists of radio stations in Asia
- Lists of radio stations in Europe
- Lists of radio stations in South America
- Lists of radio stations in the South Pacific and Oceania
