= List of Italian-language television channels =

The List of Italian-language television channels includes the following channels:

== Other countries ==
Country	Name	Owner	Notes
Canada	Mediaset Italia Canada	Telelatino	
Canada	TGcom24 Canada	Telelatino	
Canada	Telelatino	Telelatino	part of the programming in Spanish language
France	Euronews	Euronews SA	
France	Mediaset Italia	Mediaset	
France	Rai Italia	RAI	
Malaysia	Astro Bella	Astro All Asia Networks plc	part of the programming in Malaysian, Spanish and Tagalog language
San Marino	San Marino RTV	San Marino RTV	
Slovenia	TV Koper-Capodistria	RTV SLO	
Switzerland	RSI La 1	SRG SSR	
Switzerland	RSI La 2	SRG SSR	
Switzerland	Erde und Mensch	Radio Santec	
Vatican	CTV	Vatican Television Center	

== See also ==
- Lists of television channels
- List of Italian-language radio stations
