= List of Polish-language radio stations =

== National public radio broadcaster ==
Polskie Radio (PR) is Poland's national public radio broadcaster and operates four national FM stations:

- Jedynka - Generalist station featuring news, sports and adult contemporary music
- Dwójka - High culture channel dedicated to classical music, jazz, literature, and drama
- Trójka - Alternative music and culture station with free-form programming
- Radio 24 - 24-hour news, current affairs and talk radio

Additionally, PR operates six DAB+ and Internet channels:

- Czwórka - Youth-focused alternative music radio featuring programs on lifestyle, sport and technology
- Chopin - 24-hour classical music channel dedicated to Fryderyk Chopin
- Radio Dzieciom - Children-oriented service featuring educational and entertaining content
- Radio Kierowców - Driver-focused service with traffic reports, automotive news, and adult contemporary music.
- Radio dla Ukrainy - Ukrainian language service
- Radio Poland - International, external broadcasting service

Besides PR, there are also 17 independent regional public stations:

- Radio Kraków - Culture-oriented radio station broadcasting in the Lesser Poland Voivodeship, featuring free-form programs, culture magazines, local news and niche subjects
- Polskie Radio RDC - Culture-oriented radio station broadcasting in the Mazovian Voivodeship, featuring free-form programs, culture magazines, local news and niche subjects
- Radio Szczecin - Adult contemporary hit radio station broadcasting in the West Pomeranian Voivodeship, featuring local news, sport and traffic reports

== National commercial networks ==
=== RMF ===
- RMF FM - Adult contemporary hit radio station featuring news, sport and traffic reports
- RMF MAXX - Contemporary hit radio network
- RMF Classic - Classical music, film score, cultural news and literature
- RMF 24 - News and current affairs radio station featuring pop rock music
- Radio Gra/Jura/90/Alex - Local hot adult contemporary radio stations featuring regional news from Toruń, Częstochowa, Rybnik Coal Area, Cieszyn Silesia and Zakopane

=== Eurozet ===
- Radio Zet - Adult contemporary hit radio station featuring news, sport and traffic reports
- TOK FM - Progressive talk radio featuring news, current affairs, documentaries, interviews and discussions
- Złote Przeboje - Adult hits network with hits from the 80s and 90s serving as the core
- Antyradio - Rock music radio featuring mainstream and alternative rock
- Radio Plus - Classic hits network (music from the 80s serving as the core) featuring local news magazines and progressive Catholic programs
- Radio Pogoda - Oldies music network featuring music from the 50s up to the late 70s
- Meloradio - CHR/dance network
- Kiss FM - Contemporary hit radio network focusing mainly on youth, featuring music trending on social media and Spotify
- Chillizet - Easy listening music station featuring alternative, indie pop, lo-fi, soul, jazz and lifestyle and cultural programs

=== Time ===
- Radio Eska - Contemporary hit radio network
- Eska 2 - Polish music radio network
- Eska Rock - Active rock service
- VOX FM - Dance music station featuring 80s, 90s and XXI century euro disco, eurodance, italo disco and disco polo mixed with mainly electronic dance music contemporary hits
- Radio Plus - Classic hits network (music from the 80s serving as the core) featuring local news magazines and progressive Catholic programs
- Radio Fama - Contemporary hit radio network with greater emphasis on dance music and local news broadcasting from Słupsk, Żyrardów, Wołomin and Tomaszów Mazowiecki

=== Independent ===
- Radio Maryja - Catholic and far-right conservative talk service known for its direct involvement in politics, mainly Law and Justice political party support and taking positions against feminism, gay rights, liberal values, Donald Tusk and Civic Coalition, the "Islamisation" of Europe, Middle Eastern refugees and the EU
- Radio Wnet - Generalist radio station featuring conservative talk, cultural magazines and alternative music
- Radio Rekord - Dance music radio network featuring local news and interviews, broadcasting disco polo, pop and dance music

== Polish radio-related sites ==
- radiopolska.pl - the biggest Polish radio site featuring news, AM/FM/DAB+ station list and forum
- fmdx.pl - main Polish website for DXing
- maps.fmdx.pl - maps of radio transmitters in Europe, Asia and Northern Africa
- emsoft.ct8.pl - polish radio station list including URL streams of national and regional services
- xploradio - Polish DXer Maciej Ługowski blog featuring DXing, travel and media
