= Radio 100,7 =

- Luxembourg; Luxembourg
- Broadcast area: Luxembourg; Belgium; France; Germany
- Frequency: 100.7 MHz

Programming
- Language: Luxembourgish

Ownership
- Owner: Média de Service Public 100,7

History
- Founded: 27 July 1991
- First air date: 19 September 1993
- Former names: Honnert, 7 (1993–2002)

Technical information
- Transmitter coordinates: 49°43′11.06″N 6°15′55.90″E

Links
- Website: 100komma7.lu

radio 100,7 is a public service radio station in the Grand Duchy of Luxembourg. Broadcasting in the Luxembourgish language, the station's principal focus is on culture and information, although entertainment – in the form of a relatively wide spectrum of music, with the accent on classical – also features prominently.

== History ==
Established under the provisions of Luxembourg's Electronic Media Act of July 1991, and run by the Établissement de Radiodiffusion Socioculturelle du Grand-Duché de Luxembourg (ERSL), the station began broadcasting on 19 September 1993 as honnert, 7: de soziokulturelle radio ("one hundred point seven: the socio-cultural radio station"). The name, derived from its allocated FM frequency of 100.7 MHz, was changed in 2002 to "Radio 100,7".

In 2022, the Luxembourgisch government passed a law that replaced the ERSL with Média de Service Public 100,7 (MSP) as the owning parent company of Radio 100,7.

Radio 100,7 has been a member of the European Broadcasting Union since 1997 and co-operates closely with other European public-service broadcasters.

== See also ==
- List of radio stations in Luxembourg
