= List of radio stations in Oceania =

These are lists of South-Pacific, and Oceanian radio stations:

== Australia ==
- List of radio stations in Australian Capital Territory
- List of radio stations in New South Wales
- List of radio stations in Northern Territory
- List of radio stations in Queensland
- List of radio stations in South Australia
- List of radio stations in Tasmania
- List of radio stations in Victoria
- List of radio stations in Western Australia
- List of early radio broadcast stations in Western Australia

== Other countries/territories ==
- List of radio stations in Guam
- List of radio stations in Hawaii
- List of radio stations in the Federated States of Micronesia
- List of radio stations in New Zealand
- List of radio stations in Palau

== See also ==
- List of radio stations in Africa
- List of radio stations in the Americas
- List of radio stations in Asia
- Lists of radio stations in Europe
