= Első Pesti Egyetemi Rádió =

Coordinates: 47.49278°N 19.06149°E

- Budapest; Hungary
- Frequency: 97.0 MHz

Programming
- Format: Educational

Ownership
- Owner: Eötvös Loránd University

History
- First air date: October 2004

Links
- Website: eper.elte.hu

Első Pesti Egyetemi Rádió (First University Radio in Pest, 97.0 MHz) is a Budapest-based nonprofit community radio station, broadcasting from the campus of Eötvös Loránd University. It is informally named EPER (since eper means strawberry in Hungarian, the fruit is one of the station's symbols).

== History ==
EPER started broadcasting in October 2004. It is operated by the Média Universalis Alapítvány foundation together with the Media Department of Eötvös Loránd University.

== Programs ==
EPER broadcasts university lectures (pre-recorded) and magazine programs made by the students. Its unique Oral History page collects the memoirs from Hungarians of various backgrounds, covering the whole 20th century history of Hungary. The station has a new radio drama every semester.

The station is managed by teachers and technical personnel at the department. Programs are made by professors and students - both as volunteers of the station. Students can study radio production in practice and theory. Their tasks include documentaries, radio plays, game shows, oral history and educational programs. They have several live shows made by the students, but most programs are pre-recorded and edited.

== Features ==
In 2010 the station re-created Orson Welles' famous War of the Worlds in Hungarian, as if a fictional radio station would air this program in Hungary in 1938, using sound effects of that period.

== See also ==
- List of community radio stations in Hungary
