= List of radio stations in Sweden =

This is a list of radio stations in Sweden and elsewhere broadcasting exclusively or partly in the Swedish language.

== Sveriges Radio ==
=== National networks ===
- Sveriges Radio P1, talk and news
- Sveriges Radio P2, classical music
- Sveriges Radio P3, CHR and indie music
- Sveriges Radio P4, local news and pop music AC

=== Digital radio ===
- Ekot
- P2 Språk och Musik
- P3 Din Gata
- P4 Plus
- P6
- Radioapans Knattekanal
- Sameradion

=== Regional stations ===
==== Sveriges Radio P4 ====
- Stockholm
- Blekinge
- Dalarna
- Gotland
- Gävleborg
- Göteborg
- Halland
- Jämtland
- Jönköping
- Kalmar
- Kristianstad
- Kronoberg
- Malmö
- Norrbotten
- Sjuhärad
- Skaraborg
- Sörmland
- Uppland
- Värmland
- Väst
- Västerbotten
- Västernorrland
- Västmanland
- Örebro
- Östergötland

== Private ==
=== Commercial radio ===
==== Networks ====
- Rix FM (Viaplay) (Hot AC)
- Mix Megapol (Bauer) (AC)
- Lugna Favoriter (Viaplay)
- NRJ (Bauer)
- Retro FM (Bauer)
- Gold FM (Bauer)

==== Local distribution ====
Owned by Viaplay:

- Bandit Rock 106-3 (Stockholm)
- Bandit Rock 104-8 (Göteborg)
- Star FM 101,9 (Stockholm)
- Power Hit Radio (Stockholm)

Owned by Bauer:

- Rockklassiker (Stockholm)
- Rockklassiker Hård Rock (Stockholm)
- Mix Megapol Borås (Borås)
- Mix Megapol Göteborg (Göteborg)
- Mix Megapol Malmö (Malmö)
- Radio Nostalgi (Frillesås)
- Vinyl FM (Stockholm)
- Lugna Klassiker (Stockholm)
- Retro FM Skåne (Skåne)
- Retro FM Malmö (Malmö)
- Gold FM Växjö (Växjö)
- Gold FM Alvesta (Alvesta)
- Svensk Pop (Växjö)
- SportSnack Sveriges (Stockholm)

Owned by others:

- East FM (Norrköping)
- Favorit 103.9 (Södertälje)
- Radio Guld (Sundsvall)

=== Community radio ===
Non-commercial community radio license (närradio).

- Radio Boden 98.2 MHz
- Burlöv Lomma närradio Radio 92
- Radio Eskilstuna 92.7
- Falkenberg Radio WakeUp 105.1
- Radio Falköping 90.8
- Radio Gagnef 105.9 & 107.7
- Radio GalaxyFM 91.6 kristianstad
- Göteborgs Närradioförening 94.9, 102.6 & 103.1
- Götene Radio Kinnekulle 102.6
- Håbo Närradio
- Hallstahammar-Surahammar Hallsta-Sura närradio 103.7
- Halmstad närradio 88.6
- Heby Närradio
- Helsingborgs Närradio 99.2
- Höganäs närradio 104.9
- Radio Högsby 90.9
- Jönköping Radio Vättervåg 98.5
- Karlstad Kunskapsradion 92.2 (Torsby 89.0, Sunne 92.0)
- Radio Krokom 101.0
- Kungsbacka närradioförening 95.2
- Radio Lidingö 97.8
- Radio Lidköping 93.8
- Linköpings Närradio 95.5
- Radio Ljungby 95.8
- Radio Ljusdal 89.2, 98.7 & 101.5
- Lund Radio AF - Studentradion
- Malmökanalen Malmö Närradioförening 89.2 & 90.2
- Radio Mariestad 92.4
- Radio Mölndal 90.7
- Radio Mullsjö 95.6
- Radio Nacka 99.9
- Nässjö Höglandets Närradioförening Radio P5 103.9
- Radio Norrköping 89.0
- Norrtälje Radio Roslagen 107.8
- Radio Nybro 89.9 & 98.1
- Örebro Närradio 95.3
- Radio Örnsköldsvik
- Orsa Närradio 91.3 & 107.2
- Partille Radio 88
- Piteå Pite FM Studentradion 92.8
- Radio Sala
- Radio Skövde 90.4
- Radio Söderhamn 89.7
- Radio Sollefteå 96.1, 99.8 & 106.8
- Spinning Seal FM
- Stockholm Girls FM 80.6
- Stockholm Järva & Västerorts närradioförening Spånga & Vällingby 90.5 & 91.1
- Stockholm Närradio Hägersten 88 & 95.3, also 101.1 (Radio Sydost)
- Stockholm Radio Sydväst Bredäng 88.9
- Sunne & Torsby Radio Fryksdalen 100.6 & 104.1
- Svalöv Närradio CMR 105.5
- Svenstavik Radio Berg (Jämtland)
- Radio Tidaholm 101.6
- Radio Trollhättan 90.6
- Uppsala Studentradion 98.9
- Radio Vara 87.8
- Värnamo Närradioförening
- Västerås Närradio 93.7
- Radio 94.3

== Stations broadcasting in Swedish outside Sweden ==
=== Public-service stations (Finland) ===
- Yle X3M - see Yleisradio
- Yle Vega - see Yleisradio

== Internet ==
- Radioseven, dance music
