= Polskie Radio 24 =

Polish national news radio station

Polskie Radio 24 Logo

Polskie Radio 24 (Polish Radio 24) is the news radio station established by Polskie Radio, the Polish national public-service radio broadcaster.

== History ==
Essentially (since 2010) the program could be heard exclusively over the Internet, but since 1 October 2013 it is also available via digital radio (DAB) and since 1 September 2016 it is available on FM – on former Polskie Radio Program IV frequencies.

== Programming ==
The station (as seen in October 2016) consists exclusively of news and spoken-magazines with no music (except adverts and station ID's). It makes extensive use of Polskie Radio foreign reporters as well as journalists from Polskie Radio regional and local stations, Polskie Radio Program I and Polskie Radio Program III. The Monday to Friday schedule consists of rolling news and talk in the morning and afternoon, as well as magazines and summaries in the evening.

At weekends the broadcast is more focused at various magazines, but breakfast programming and day summary are in the schedule.

== Reception ==
The broadcast is available on FM and DAB - the FM transmitters cover 17% of Poland's territory (30% of population), while DAB covers some gaps in the reception, but even though the station has the lowest coverage of four national FM Polskie Radio networks.
