= Virgin Radio Romania =

Romanian national radio station

Virgin Radio
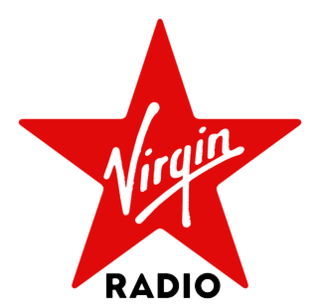

Romania
- Broadcast area: Soseaua Pipera, nr.44, Oregon Park, București

Programming
- Affiliations: Europa FM, One World Radio

Ownership
- Owner: Czech Media Invest

History
- Former names: Radio 21

Links
- Website: www.virginradio.ro

Virgin Radio Romania is a Romanian national radio station with coverage in almost all the cities of the country.

Virgin Radio started broadcasting in Romania on 9 January 2017. Virgin Radio Romania is part of a media group that also operates Europa FM and Vibe FM.

Created as Romania's interactive radio station for youngsters, Virgin Radio Romania is the place for new music and innovation.

It is the only Romanian radio station that became the official partner for Tomorrowland, as well as for major festivals which took place locally and across Europe.

Virgin Radio Romania is broadcasting 24/7 hip hop, r&b and new music. In the past years, it has generated one of the most engaging contests and campaigns on air and on line. The station hosted the internationally known Secret Sound contest (called CSAUD), as well as the first on air and online live marathons, having Andrei Niculae as a host.

Virgin Radio Romania is the first station in Romania officially recognized on TikTok and the first to allow listeners to control the music and the programs via a feature called PlayDJ that can be used in the Virgin Radio Romania app or via www.virginradio.ro.

The morning show has two hosts, Bogdan Ciudoiu and Ionuț Bodonea, Mondays to Fridays, from 6:30 AM until 10:00 AM. During the day, Virgin Radio Romania has programs focused on music and interaction via WhatsApp, the Virgin Radio Romania app, social media and the website.

== Frequencies ==
Oraș	Frecvență	Oraș	Frecvență	Oraș	Frecvență
Aiud	94.4 FM	Cluj	93.2 FM	Piatra Neamț	105.9 FM
Alba Iulia	97.7 FM	Comănești	91.6 FM	Pitești	95.0 FM
Arad	99.8 FM	Constanța	88.5 FM	Râmnicu Vâlcea	91.5 FM
Bacău	105.4 FM	Deva	102.6 FM	Reşiţa	94.8 FM
Baia Mare	92.1 FM	Dobruja Sud	105.2 FM	Sibiu	105.4 FM
Baraolt	90.0 FM	Drăgăneṣti	106.6 FM	Suceava	97.1 FM
Bistrița	103.2 FM	Iași	101.6 FM	Târgu Jiu	88.9 FM
Borsec	91.1 FM	Mangalia	104.1 FM	Târgu Mureș	92.7 FM
Botoșani	104.2 FM	Miercurea Ciuc	106.1 FM	Timișoara	90.8 FM
Brăila	94.4 FM	Negrești-Oaș	96.0 FM	Tulcea	107.9 FM
Brașov	92.5 FM	Onești	89.9 FM	Voineasa	97.9 FM
Bucharest	100.2 FM	Pașcani	91.4 FM	Zalău	97.7 FM
Buzău	98.7 FM	Petroșani	89.2 FM	Zimnicea	107.3 FM
