= List of radio stations in Serbia =

This is a list of radio stations in Serbia (as of May 2010).

== National coverage ==
Name
RTS Radio Beograd 1
RTS Radio Beograd 2/3
RTS Radio Beograd 202
Play Radio
Radio S1
Radio S2
Radio Hit FM
Radio Karolina

== Vojvodina ==
This is a list of radio stations in Vojvodina.

Frequency (MHz)	Name	Format
87.7 MHz	Radio Novi Sad 1	Adult Contemporary
90.5 MHz	Radio Novi Sad 2	Hungarian language radio Adult Contemporary
91.7 MHz	Radio Novi Sad 3	Slovak language radio Rusyn language radio German language radio Croatian language radio Romanian language radio Romani language radio Adult Contemporary
100.0 MHz	Radio Stotka	Adult Contemporary; Top 40 Pop

== City of Belgrade ==
This is a list of radio stations in Belgrade. There are 17 radio stations in Belgrade.

Frequency (MHz)	Name	Format
87.7 MHz	Bum Bum Radio	Serbian Folk Pop
90.2 MHz	Radio Jat	Serbian Pop
90.9 MHz	Radio S3	Serbian Folk Pop
91.3 MHz	Radio Pink	Serbian Folk Pop
91.8 MHz	TDI Radio	Top 40
93.7 MHz	RED Radio	Top 40/Pop
95.8 MHz	Radio In	Adult Contemporary Serbian Pop Folk
96.2 MHz	Rock Radio	Rock
96.9 MHz	Naxi Radio	Adult Contemporary Serbian Pop
99.1 MHz	Radio Studio B	Top 40/Pop & News
100.4 MHz	WTF Radio	Top 40
102.2 MHz	Radio S4	Soft Adult Contemporary, Ex Yu
104.7 MHz	Radio Novosti	Adult Contemporary
105.2 MHz	Radio Nostalgija	Oldies
106.3 MHz	Radio Lola	Etno
106.8 MHz	Top FM	Euro Hits, Top 40/Pop, Dance
107.3 MHz	Slovo Ljubve	Christian Contemporary
107.9 MHz	Super FM	Top 40 Pop

== See also ==
- List of radio stations in Kosovo
- List of radio stations in Montenegro
