= List of Hungarian-language radio stations =

The following is a list of radio stations that broadcast in Hungarian.

== Radio broadcasting in Hungarian in Hungary ==
=== Nationwide and half-nationwide broadcasting in Hungary ===
- Kossuth Rádió (AM, FM)
- Petőfi Rádió (FM)
- Bartók Rádió (FM)
- Nemzetiségi (AM)
- Parlament (SAT)
- Dankó Rádió (AM, FM)
- Retró Rádió (FM)
- Rádió 1 (FM) (radio station network (non-nationwide broadcasting), we can mainly listen central produced shows at all broadcast areas, but some non-Budapest broadcast area local news and traffic announcement, shows included (before 5 a.m excluded)
- Karc FM (FM)
- Magyar Katolikus Rádió (FM)
- Mária Rádió Magyarország (FM)

=== Broadcasting in Budapest ===
- Rádió 1 89.5
- Trend FM 94.2
- InfoRádió 88.1
- Tilos Rádió 90.3
- Jazzy 90.9
- Best FM 99.5
- Sláger FM 95.8
- Retro Rádió 103.3
- Petőfi Rádió 94.8
- Bartók Rádió 105.3
- Dankó Rádió 100.8
- Manna FM 98.6

== Radio broadcasting in Hungarian in Romania ==
- Radio Cluj/Kolozsvári Rádió - 24 hr/day
- Radio Timişoara/Temesvári Rádió - 1+1hr/day
- Radio Mureş/Marosvásárhelyi Rádió - 8hr/day
- City Rádió - all day
- Agnus Rádió - 8hr/day
- Mária Rádió - 12hr/day
- Rádió Gaga - mostly broadcasting in Hungarian
- Prima Rádió - all day
- Profi Rádió - all day
- Star Rádió - all day
- Sláger Rádió - all day
- Mix Fm - all day
- Radio Siculus - all day
- Plusz FM - all day
- Vox FM - all day
- Fun Fm - all day
- Paprika Rádió - all day
- Erdély FM - all day
- Alpimur Radio - all day

== Radio broadcasting in Hungarian in Slovakia ==
- Pátria Rádió - 10hr/day

== Radio broadcasting in Hungarian in Serbia ==
- Radio Novi Sad/Újvidéki Rádió - all day
- Szabadkai Magyar Rádió - all day
- Pannon Rádió - all day
- Rádió 90 - all day
- Adai rádió - all day
- Mária rádió - 12hrs
- Panda radio
- Max Rádió

== Radio broadcasting in Hungarian in Slovenia ==
- Muravidéki Magyar Rádió - 15hr/day

== Radio broadcasting in Hungarian in Austria ==
- Radio Burgenland - 0.5hr/day
- Hit FM Burgenland - Tuesday, Thursday evening
- Radio OP - Friday evening

== Radio broadcasting in Hungarian in Ukraine ==
- Sion Rádió - all day
- Pulzus FM - 12hr/day

== Radio broadcasting in Hungarian in Croatia ==
- Eszéki rádió - 30min/day
- Baranya rádió - 2X30min/week

== Defunct radios ==
- Sláger Radio
- Class FM
- Neo FM
- STAR FM
- Roxy Radio
- Music FM
- Lánchíd rádió

== See also ==
- List of community radio stations in Hungary
