= Vinyl FM =

Radio station in Sweden

Vinyl FM is a Swedish radio station founded in September 1994. Vinyl FM is part of the Bauer Media Group. It focuses on mostly American hits from the 60s and the 70s. In March 2003, Vinyl FM was awarded "Radio Station of the year" by the Radio Awards jury. Vinyl FM is only oldies station and one of the largest local stations in Stockholm. It also has a station in Linköping.

In 1994 the ratings was 3.6%, today the ratings are 5% of the total Stockholm market.
