= List of community radio stations in Hungary =

This list contains all radio stations that have been broadcasting on the FM or AM band in Hungary or are members of the Hungarian Federation of Free Radios. These stations are variously called community, small community, or free radios. Their licence have been termed "non-profit" or "public program provider" before the 2010 media law that introduced the terms "small community" and "community" media services, the latter also including commercial stations with public service type programming. Commercial (for-profit) operations are not included in this list.

Name	Frequency	Location	Year of start or first mention	End of operation	Type	Operator
4-SSSS Rádió	97.9	Téglás	2004.01.15			Pánik Kulturális Egyesület
Agnus Rádió						
Abakusz Rádió	98.0	Hajdúböszörmény	2005.01.11			Abakusz Kör Közhasznú Egyesület
Alfa Rádió	88.0	Balkány	2008.04.22			AndrySoft Bt.
Alpha Rádió	88.9	Székesfehérvár		Active	Small Community	ALBA REGIA Műsorszolgáltató Kft.
Arc Rádió						
Balaton Rádió (Fokihegy R)						
Baross Rádió						
Base FM Rádió						
Berettyó Night	88.0	Berettyóújfalu	2007.03.23			Halics Attila Miklós
Berettyó Rádió	97.9	Berettyóújfalu	2004.10.29.	Active	Small Community	Kogyilla Zsolt
Berzsenyi Rádió	98.8	Szombathely	2004.11.15.			Nyugat-Magyarországi Egyetem Savaria Egyetemi Központja
Best of Rádió	98.0	Tiszavasvári	2008.04.24			Tiszavasvári Média Egyesület
Best Rádió						
Börtön Rádió						
Broadway Rádió	87.6	Budapest		Active	Small Community	Közösségi Rádiózásért Egyesület
Campus Rádió	97.9	Nyíregyháza	2005.01.19			Nyíregyházi Főiskola Képzési és Továbbképzési Intézet
Cirmi Rádió -	Civil Rádió Miskolc					
Citrom Rádió						
City Rádió						
Civil Rádió	98.0	Budapest			Community	Civil Rádiózásért Alapitvány
Cool FM	107.3	Budapest	2004.01.15			Puskás Tivadar Távközlési Technikum
Credo Rádió	98.8	Szombathely	2014.02.18	Active	Small Community	Szombathelyi Evangélikus Egyházközség
C-street Rádió						
Csobán Rádió	93.5	Csobánka	2007.09.18			Gordon Lajos
Crazy FM	88.7	Miskolc	2010.05.27			Kalló Gyula
Csillaghang Rádió	93.7	Budapest	2006.03.01			Csillaghalom Polgári Egylet
Csillagpont Rádió	94.0	Miskolc	2010.05.27			Borsod-Abaúj-Zemplén Megye Betegeiért Alapítvány
Diák Rádió Edelény	91.9	Edelény	2006.02.27			Almási Ákos
Diák Rádió Kazincbarcika	92.4	Kazincbarcika	2005.10.26			Diák Rádió Kazincbarcika Műsorszolgáltató Bt.
Diák Rádió Ózd	98.9	Ózd	2006.02.27			Kocsis Gyula Levente
Diák Rádió Szerencs	91.4	Szerencs	2006.02.27			Szabó Zsuzsanna Judit
Diórádió						
Diósgyőr Rádió	92.4	Miskolc	2004.06.07			Diósgyőri Ady Endre Kulturális és Szabadidő Központ
Domb Rádió Sellye	91.4	Sellye	2006.01.11			Ars Longa Alapítvány
Dunakanyar Rádió	94.1	Vác				World Média Kft.
Europa Rádió	multiple	6 locations			Religious	"EURÓPA RÁDIÓ" Nonprofit Közhasznú Kft.
Első Pesti Egyetemi Rádió	97.0	Budapest	2004.01.15	Active	Small Community	Média Universalis Alapítvány
EXE rádió						
FenZen Rádió	102.9	Székesfehérvár	2007.05.03			"A Tehetséges Zenészekért" Alapítvány
Fiksz Rádió						
Folkrádió						
FM1 Rádió	107.0	Miskolc	2011.07.09	Active	Small Community	FM1 Műsorszolgáltató Kft.
FM90 Campus Rádió Debrecen	90	Debrecen			Local/Community	Friss Rádió Kft
Fúzió Rádió	93.5	Budapest	2005.06.16			Napszél Egyesület
Fresh FM						
FRISS FM	93.4	Kisvárda	2014.02.05			Összefogás Kisvárdáért Egyesület
Galaxis Rádió	97.9	Heves	2008.04.24			Összefogás Heves Városért Egyesület
Gorba Rádió	107.4	Tardos	2008.04.22			Vörösmárvány Művelődési Ház
Haraszti Hangja Rádió	96.6	Dunaharaszti	2007.12.06			Kovács Gergely Botond
Harmónia Rádió						
Helló Rádió	101.4	Budapest XIV. district	2008. 6. 23.			D.K. Digitális Kommunikációs Közhasznú Nonprofit Kft.
Hernád Völgye Rádió Aszaló	92.4	Aszaló	2007.05.21			Göőz József Általános Iskola. Napköziotthonos Óvoda és Könyvtár
H-ifi Rádió Bóly	99.4	Bóly	2009.05.15			Erzsébet Vigadó és Városi Könyvtár
Hobby Rádió						
István Király Rádió	91.0	Győr	2006.03.08			Benkó Tibor
Jazz FM	102.4	Debrecen	2008.04.22			Tóth András e.v.
Junior Rádió						
Kábel Rádió						
KandoFM Iskolarádió						
Karcag FM	88.0	Karcag	2008.04.22	Active	Small Community	KUN-MÉDIA Kft., earlier Kunszövetség Egyesület
Kerepes Rádió	97.1	Kerepes	2007.09.17			Springer Krisztina
Kis-Duna Rádió	97.0	Áporka	2007.03.08			Közalapítvány Áporka Községért
Kontakt Rádió (later: Broadway Rádió)	87.6	Budapest Terézváros	2008. 6. 23.			Közösségi Rádiózásért Egyesület
Krisna Rádió						
Látszótér Rádió						
Laza Rádió						
Lépés Rádió						
Lesz Rádió						
Liget Rádió						
Madách Rádió						
Martos Rádió						
MaxiRádió	92.4	Gyöngyös	2013.10.25	Active	Small Community	Mátra Média Kulturális Egyesület
Mária Rádió	multiple	Active on ca. 20 stations nationwide		Active	Religious	Mária Rádió Frekvencia Kft.; Magyar Múzsa Kft.; FM 4 Rádió Szolgáltató Kft. (Budapest); Magyarországi Mária Rádió Közhasznú Alapítvány
Méliusz Rádió	88.0	Debrecen	2004.02.27			Kölcsey Ferenc Református Tanítóképző Főiskola
Motoroshang Rádió						
Mustár FM						
Mustár Rádió	89.6	Nyíregyháza	2007.05.25	Active	Small Community	Kulturális Életért Közhasznú Egyesület
Muzik Rádió	88.9	Székesfehérvár	2008.04.22			Muzikland Kft.
Muzsikus Rádió						
Net Rádió Földeák						
Origó-ház Rádió Mecsekszabolcs (Origó Rádió)	87.8	Pécs	2005.03.16			Pécs-Baranyai Origóház Egyesület
Park Rádió	99.5	Miskolc	2007.07.11			Média a Belvárosért Egyesület
Periszkóp Rádió	97.1	Pécs	2006.03.02			Moiré Kulturális Egyesület
Pont Rádió	89.9	Mezőtúr	2005.06.16	Active	Small Community	Actor Informatikai és Nyomda Kft.
Publikum Rádió (GFM)						
Puszta Rádió	89.9	Kunszentmiklós	2004.07.29.			Felső-Kiskunsági Közösségi Munkások Egyesülete
Rádió 33						
Rádió 35						
Rádió Avas	98.9	Miskolc	2006.02.28			Avasi Kulturális és Sport Egyesület
Rádió Balaton	88.7	Siófok	2011.05.11	Active	Small Community	Szabó Ferenc
Rádió C						
Rádió Cell	98.8	Celldömölk	2006.03.13			Kerekes Gábor
Rádió Csobán						
Rádió Derecske						
Rádió Egy 100						
Rádió Eper	92.4	Miskolc	2008. 6. 23.			Sound Stúdió 69 Kft.
Rádió FM 87,8 MHz	87.8	Érd	2010.11.17			Extrém Business Kft.
Rádió Füzes	92.4	Füzesabony	2005.09.19			Szabó Sándor Miklós e.v.
Rádió Gilvánfa						
Rádió Ice	94.2	Makó	2006.02.28			Sas Zsolt
Rádió Juice						
Rádió MI	89.9	Szeged	2004.06.04			Itt Szeged - Egyesület a Rádióért és a Kultúráért
Rádió Net						
Rádió Paprikáskrumpli						
Rádió Pozitív						
Rádió Sansz	87.8	Székesfehérvár	2005.10.24		Religious	Alba Sansz Alapítvány
Rádió Smile	89.9	Kiskunfélegyháza	2008.04.24	Active	Small Community	Mosoly Média Kft., earlier Csőszi Viktor
Rádió Studio, Stúdió FM 96,3	96.3	Zalaegerszeg	2007.07.04			Radio Studio Kft.
Rádió Sun	88.8	Gyomaendrőd	2011.09.09	Active	Small Community	Gyomaendrőd Kultúrájáért Egyesület
Rádió Szarvas	105.4	Szarvas, Békésszentandrás	2007.05.02	Active	Small Community	Mediorix Szolgáltató Bt., earlier Mediorix Egészségügyi és Szolgáltató Bt.
Rádió Szentendre	91.6	Szentendre	2011.07.21	Active	Small Community	Budakalászi Média Kft., earlier Fanny-Film Kft.
Rádió Törökszentmiklós	89.6	Törökszentmiklós	2014.02.13	Active	Small Community	Rádió Horizont Kft.
Rádió Weekend	89.9	Tótkomlós	2006.03.03			Tuska Milán
Rádió X	105.4	Hódmezővásárhely	2005.01.25			Ágoston Lajos
Rakamaz FM	98.9	Rakamaz	2008.05.08			Veritas Egyesület
Rákóczi Hírmondó	89.9	Rákóczifalva	2004.08.05			Emberkék az Emberért Egyesület
Remete Rádió	87.8	Pécs	2004.01.15			Istenkúti Közösségért Egyesület
Rádió Q	99.5	Budapest	2006.10.26.		Community	Start Média Kft.
Sirius Rádió	92.4	Gyömrő				Laczy István
Sokol Rádió						
Sport Rádió						
Star Dance Rádió						
Szajkó Rádió						
Sulinfó Rádió	97.5	Székesfehérvár				Szent István Mezőgazdasági és Élelmiszeripari Szakképző Iskola
Szlovén Rádió	97.7, 106.6	Felsőszölnök, Szentgotthárd		Active	Ethnic	Szlovén Rádió Közhasznú Nonprofit Kft.
Szegvár Rádió						
Sziget Rádió						
Szinva Rádió	99.5	Miskolc	2007.07.12			Média a Belvárosért Egyesület
Szóbeszéd Rádió	89.9	Mártély	2004.06.11			Csernai Árpád ev. - Carpak Stúdió
Szóla Rádió	102.4	Debrecen				Szóla Rádió Alapítvány
Szombathelyi Közösségi Rádió - Szóköz Rádió						
Szomszédsági Rádió						
Tarcsa FM						
Táska Rádió	97.5	Székesfehérvár	2013.04.19	Active	Small Community	Lánczos Kornél Gimnázium
Tavirózsa Rádió	107.3	Veresegyház	2006.03.06			Tavirózsa Környezet- és Természetvédő Egyesület
Telerádió						
Tilos Rádió	90.3 (formerly 95.5)		1991 (as pirate)	Active	Community	Tilos Kulturális Alapítvány
Tisza Rádió	94.2	Szeged	2005.06.16			Kárász Közhasznú Egyesület
Tm Stúdió						
Tordas Rádió						
Triangulum Rádió	88.7	Őriszentpéter	2004.04.15			Őri Alapítvány
Új Rádió Esztergom						
Universitas Rádió						
Universum Rádió						
Vértes Rádió	88.7	Zámoly	2004.07.29			"Háló" Zámoly Fejlődéséért Egyesület
Zagyvan Rádió	92.4	Hatvan	2008.05.07			"Pályakezdők Szakiskolájáért" Oktatási és Kulturális Alapítvány
Zöld Rádió	92.4	Erdőkertes	2006.03.02			Zöld Rádió Közhasznú Egyesület
Zöld Hullám Rádió	107.4	Piliscsaba	2007.09.20			Piliscsabáért Egyesület
Zsebrádió	87.8	Halásztelek	2004.07.29			Pöcök Kulturális Egyesület

Additional networks and stations operate with "community" licence that include news, public affairs, music stations, religious regional and semi-national networks and local commercial stations.

== The number of small community radio stations in Hungary ==
Year	Number*
2004	7
2005	24
2006	44
2007	51
2008	62
2009	58
2010	61
2011	47
2012	38
2013	24
2014	27
2015	23
2016	20
2017	20

*Small Community licensed stations
