= List of Italian-language radio stations =

This is a list of radio stations broadcasting regularly programmes in Italian outside Italy:

== Local broadcast ==
List of radios company in Italian language:

Radio	Frequency (kHz)	Frequency (MHz)	Transmitter	Zones	Notes
(Australia) Rete Italia	1593		Melbourne	Australia	
(Australia) Rete Italia	1539		Sydney	Australia	
(Australia) Rete Italia	1053		Brisbane	Australia	
(Australia) Rete Italia	1629		Adelaide	Australia	
(Australia) Rete Italia	657		Perth	Australia	
(Australia) Rete Italia	1611		Darwin	Australia	
(Switzerland) RSI Rete Uno		DAB+ Internet	various	Switzerland, Lombardy region	
(Switzerland) RSI Rete Due		DAB+ Internet	various	Switzerland, Lombardy region	
(Switzerland) RSI Rete Tre		DAB+ Internet	various	Switzerland, Lombardy region	
(Switzerland) Radio 3i		DAB+ Internet	various	Switzerland, Lombardy region	
(Switzerland) Radio Ticino		DAB+ Internet	various	Switzerland, Lombardy region	
Radio San Marino		107,2 FM	?	San Marino area	
(United Kingdom) London ONE Radio	online		-	Londra	

=== Programs in italian language ===
Radios with programs in Italian language in the schedule:

Radio	Program	Frequency (FM in MHz)	Days	Local time	Transmitter	Zones	Years
(New Zealand) Plains FM	Cartolina	96.9	wed	19.30-20.00	Christchurch	New Zealand	
(New Zealand) Planet FM	Ondazzurra	104.6	sun	11.20	Auckland	New Zealand	
(Austria) Radiofabrik	Radiofabrik Café	97.3, 107,5	fri	19.06	Salzburg	Salisburgo	
(Republic of Ireland) Near FM	Radio Dublino	90.3	wed	15.00	Dublin	Ireland	
(Canada) CFBX	Panorama Italiano	92.5	mon	19.06	Kamloops	Canada	
(Bosnia and Herzegovina) Radio Sarajevo	Radio Italia	90.2	wed	12.10	Sarajevo	Bosnia And Herzegovina	2020-today

== International broadcast ==
=== Medium wave ===
Radio	Frequency (kHz)	Season	Days	Time (UTC)	Transmitter	Zones	QSL card
(Slovenia) Radio Capodistria	1170	Winter	daily	00:00-24:00	Beli Križ (Portorož)	Slovenia, Croatian Istria and Central-Northeastern Italy	(eQSL)
(Slovenia) Radio Capodistria	1170	Summer	daily	00:00-24:00	Beli Križ (Portorož)	Slovenia, Croatian Istria and Central-Northeastern Italy	(eQSL)
(Tunisia) Radio Tunis Chaîne Internationale	963	Winter	daily	14:03-15:00	Tunis	Part of Italy and the Mediterranean Basin (INACTIVE)	yes
(Tunisia) Radio Tunis Chaîne Internationale	963	Summer	daily	13:03-14:00	Tunis	Part of Italy and the Mediterranean Basin (INACTIVE)	yes

=== Shortwave ===
Hours valid from October 25, 2026 to March 27, 2027

Radio	Frequency(kHz)	Season	Days	Time(UTC)	Transmitter	Zones	QSL card
Radio Romania International	5955	winter	daily	15.00-15.26	Tiganesti	Europe	yes
Radio Romania International	5955	winter	daily	17.00-17.26	Tiganesti	Europe	yes
Radio Romania International	5955 (DRM)	winter	daily	19.00-19.26	Tiganesti	Europe	yes
Radio Romania International	9520	summer	daily	14.00-14.26	Tiganesti	Europe	yes
Radio Romania International	5910	summer	daily	16.00-16.26	Tiganesti	Europe	yes
Radio Romania International	5910 (DRM)	summer	daily	18.00-18.26	Tiganesti	Europe	yes
China Radio International	7340, 7435	winter	daily	18:00-19:00	Kashi	Europe	No
China Radio International	7265, 7345	winter	daily	20:30-21:30	Kashi	Europe	No
China Radio International	15620	winter	daily	06:00-06:58	Kashi	Europe	No
China Radio International	7340, 7435	summer	daily	17.00-18.00	Kashi	Europe	No
China Radio International	7265, 7345	summer	daily	19.30-20.30	Kashi	Europe	No
China Radio International	17520	summer	daily	06.00-07.00	Kashi	Europe	No
Voice of Turkey	11970	winter	daily	09:30-09:56	Emirler, Ankara Province	Europe	yes
(Egypt) Radio Cairo	9835	winter	daily	18:00-19:00	Abis	Europe	yes
Radiodifusión Argentina al Exterior	15770	winter	mon-fri	12:00-12:30	via WRMI relay in Okeechobee	Europe	yes
(Vatican City) Radio Vaticana	15595	winter	mon-sat	07:00-07:10	S. Maria Galeria	Europe	yes
I Love Italy (Voice of Italy)	15770	summer	Saturday	20:45-21:00	via WRMI relay in Okeechobee	Europe	yes

== Closed shortwave ==
Radio	Years	Transmitter	Zones	Notes
La Voce della Russia	1929-2013			
(United Kingdom) Radio Londra	1981			
(Switzerland) Swiss Radio International	1935-2004	Internet	Europe	
(Hungary) Radio Budapest	2007			
(Albania) Radio Tirana	2017 > 10-2021 (onde corte)	Internet, Satellite	Europe	
(Greece) La Voce della Grecia	2017			
(Germany) Deutschlandfunk	2007 (?)	Internet, Satellite	Europe	
(Bulgaria) Radio Sofia	1941-1997			
(Iran) Pars today	04–2022	Internet	Europe	
(Germany) Adventist World Radio	10-2024	Internet, Satellite	Europe	

== See also ==
- List of Italian language television channels
