= List of radio stations in Finland =

This is a list of radio networks and stations in Finland and elsewhere broadcasting exclusively or partly in the Finnish language.

== Public radio ==
=== Yleisradio ===
- Yle Radio 1
- YleX
- Yle Radio Suomi
- Yle Vega (in Swedish language)
- Yle X3M (in Swedish language)
- Yle Sámi Radio (in Sámi language, weekdays 7:00-17:00, timeshare with Yle Radio Suomi)
- Yle Klassinen (Internet only)
- Yle Mondo (Helsinki 97.5 FM) With retranslations Yle News (news bulletin in English), BBC World Service, RFI Monde, RNE Radio Exterior, NDR Info, and weekdays news bulletins from NRK, DR and ERR. This station not available in online.

=== Yle Regional stations ===
==== Yle Radio Suomi ====
- Helsinki
- Hämeenlinna
- Joensuu
- Jyväskylä
- Kajaani
- Kemi
- Kokkola
- Kotka
- Kuopio
- Lahti
- Lappeenranta
- Mikkeli
- Oulu
- Pohjanmaa (Vaasa and Seinäjoki)
- Pori
- Rovaniemi
- Tampere
- Turku

==== Yle Vega ====
- Huvudstadsregionen (Helsinki)
- Västnyland (Raseborg)
- Östnyland (Porvoo)
- Österbotten (Vaasa)
- Åboland (Turku)

=== Ålands Radio and TV ===
- Ålands Radio (Åland Islands 91.3 FM) (in Swedish language)

=== Sveriges Radio ===
- Sveriges Radio P1 (Åland Islands 95.0 FM)
- Sveriges Radio P2 (Åland Islands 97.1 FM)
- Sveriges Radio P3 (Åland Islands 88.6 FM)
- Sveriges Radio P4 Stockholm (Åland Islands 102.3 FM)

== Commercial radio ==
=== Radio Groups ===
- Bauer
  - Radio Nova
  - Iskelmä
  - Radio City
  - NRJ
  - Radio Nostalgia
  - Kasari
  - Classic
  - Radio Pooki
  - Radio SuomiRock
  - Basso
  - SuomiRäp
  - Top51
  - Kiss (Internet only)
  - Ysäri (Internet only)
  - Regional and local stations:
    - Auran Aallot
    - Radio 957
    - Radio Mega Oulu (Oulu 105.9 FM)
    - Radio Pori (Pori 89.4 FM and Kokemäki 98.0 FM)
    - Mix Megapol (Åland Islands 101.8 FM) (Swedish radio station)
    - Rock Klassiker (Åland Islands 107.2 FM) (Swedish radio station)
- Sanoma
  - Aito Iskelmä
  - Radio Suomipop
  - Radio Rock
  - Classic Hits
  - Easy Hits
  - HitMix
  - Loop
  - Groove FM
  - Kantri Radio (Tampere 91.6 FM and Vaasa 93.4 FM)

=== National stations ===
- Järviradio
  - Järviradio Puhe (Helsinki 105.0 FM)
- Pop FM
- Radio Dei
- Radio Helsinki

=== Regional stations ===
- Karjalainen Syke
- Radio Kaleva
- Radio Patmos
- Radio SUN
- Radio Sandels
- Sea FM

=== Local stations ===
- Finest FM (Helsinki 98.5 FM and Hyvinkää 94.4 FM) (in Estonian language)
- Lähiradio (Helsinki 100.3 FM)
- Nooa FM (Lapua 90.4 FM)
- Oulun Raviradio (Oulu 88.4 FM)
- Radio Keskisuomalainen (Pihtipudas 95.4 FM, Jyväskylä 95.9 FM, Jämsä 92.8 FM)
- Radio LFF (Luoto 98.0 FM)
- Radio Moreeni (Tampere 98.4 FM)
- Radio Musa (Tampere 100.5 FM)
- Radio Ramona (Rauma 93.3 FM and Eura 97.3 FM)
- Radio Tempo (Kotka 99.9 FM)
- Radio Vaasa (Kokkola 100.3 FM, Vaasa 99.5 FM, Teuva 97.7 FM)
- Radio Voima (Lahti 98.6 FM, Hausjärvi 91.0 FM, Sysmä 94.9 FM, Kouvola 95.8 FM)
- Savon Aallot (Iisalmi 93.5 FM, Kuopio 102.0 FM, Joroinen 107.4 FM)
- Steel FM (Åland Islands 95.9 FM) (in Swedish language)
- Tampereen Kiakkoradio (Tampere/Ylöjärvi 89.0 FM)

== Foreign stations in Finnish language ==
- Sveriges Radio Finska (DAB+ in Sweden)
- SSS-Radio (Tallinn 93.7 FM)

== See also ==
- Media of Finland
