= List of early radio broadcast stations in Western Australia =

This is a list is of local medium wave radio broadcast stations, by date of establishment in Western Australia, as they developed from the 1920s to the 1940s.

== 6WF, 1924 ==
Established by Wesfarmers in 1924, 6WF was eventually taken over by the national broadcaster, the Australian Broadcasting Commission, in 1932.

== 6ML, 1930 ==
6ML was established in 1930.

== 6KG, 1931 ==
6KG in Kalgoorlie was established in 1931.

== 6PR, 1931 ==
6PR was established in 1931.

== 6IX, 1933 ==
6iX was established in 1933.

== 6PM, 1936 ==
6PM was established in 1936.

== 6GE, 1937 ==
6GE Geraldton was established in 1937.

== 6WN, 1938 ==
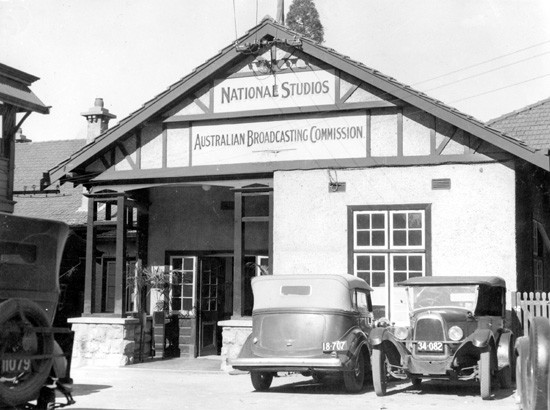
ABC building in Perth in 1937

6WN was established in 1938 as the second Perth station in the Australian Broadcasting Commission radio network.

== 6KY, 1941 ==
6KY opened in 1941.

== Networks ==
At various stages in the radio stations' histories they were linked to broadcasting networks, and operated by broadcasting companies.

Typically in the 1960s 6PR was linked to two other stations, 6TZ and 6CI.

== Broadcasting companies and organisations ==
- Australian Broadcasting Corporation
- Nicholsons Broadcasters
- West Australian Broadcasters
- Whitfords Broadcasting Network

== See also ==
- History of broadcasting in Australia
- List of Australian AM radio stations
- List of radio station callsigns in Western Australia

== General references ==
- Edmonds, Leigh; Shoesmith, Brian (2009). "Radio". In Gregory, Jenny; Gothard, Janice (eds.). Historical Encyclopedia of Western Australia (PDF). Crawley: UWA Publishing. ISBN 978-1-921401-15-2. OCLC 405500003. OL 45266821M. Wikidata Q5773872.
