= List of radio stations in Belarus =

This is a list of FM and OIRT FM Band radio stations based in Belarus. Mostly FM stations broadcast in Russian. Independent and international radio stations broadcast mostly in Belarusian.

== Independent radio stations ==
- Radio Racyja - Terrestrial (Białystok 98.1 FM and Biała Podlaska 99.2 FM) and Internet-radio station.
- Euroradio - Internet-radio station, also on satellite (HotBird 13 and Astra 3C)
- Radio Plato - Internet-radio station
- Litradio - Internet-radio station
- Radio Maria Belarus - Internet-radio station

== International radio stations ==
- Polish radio Belarusian service - 1386 AM (4:00-5:00 UTC), satellite (HotBird 13) and Internet, also retranslation in Radio Znad Wilii (Vilnius 103.8 FM) and Radio Poland DAB+ (DAB+ in Poland)
- Vatican Radio Belarusian Service - shortwave, satellite and Internet station, also retranslation in Radio Racyja and Radio Maria Belarus
- Trans World Radio Belarus - 1035 AM and Internet station
- Radio Ukraine International - 1386 AM in early morning and Internet. Weekdays news bulletin "Ukraine: Security issue"

== State radio stations ==
Note: This list also includes stations owned by oligarchs associated with the Lukashenko regime.

- The National State Television and Radio Company of the Republic of Belarus is the state television and radio broadcasting service in Belarus.
  - First Channel (FM and UKV)
  - Channel "Culture" (FM and UKV)
  - Radius-FM (FM in Belarus and 72,11 UKV in Minsk)
  - Radio "Stolitsa" (FM and UKV)
  - Radio Brest (FM and UKV)
    - Gorod FM (Brest - 97.7 FM)
  - Radio Vitebsk (FM and UKV)
  - Gomel FM (FM and UKV)
    - Homiel plus (Homiel - 103.7 FM)
  - Radio Grodno (FM and UKV)
  - Radio Mogilev (FM and UKV)
  - Radio Station "Belarus" (Internet, satellite and FM (Brest - 106.2 FM, Svislach - 104.4 FM, Hrodna - 95.7 FM, Heraneny - 99.0 FM, Miadel - 102.0 FM, Braslau - 107.7 FM))
- ONT state broadcasting:
  - Center FM
- MIR Belarusian Office:
  - Radio MIR Belarus
  - Energy FM
- Government of Minsk city:
  - Radio Minsk
- Ministry of Defence:
  - Compass FM
- State newspaper "Soviet Belarus" (SB):
  - Alpha Radio
  - Radio Pobeda (Miensk - 96.2 FM)
- Belarusian State University:
  - Radio Unistar (JV with MediaInvest GmbH)
  - Pilot FM
- Federation of Trade Unions of Belarus:
  - Novoe Radio
  - Narodnoe radio
- "Muzykalnaya Chastota" (Anna Lukashenko-Seluk):
  - Super FM
  - Dushevnoe radio
  - Radio Shanson Belarus (Miensk - 90.9 FM and Viciebsk - 91.7 FM)
- "Russian Radio" Holding (Ministry of Information of Belarus - 34%):
  - Radio ROKS Belarus
  - Russian Radio Belarus (Miensk - 98.9 FM)
- ″Trio Media″ holding (Sergei Teterin/Olga Yarmolenko-Minets/Leonid Igorevich Minets):
  - Humor FM Belarus
  - Autoradio
  - Radio Relax
- ″Vladimir Grevtsov Agency″:
  - Legendy FM
- "Summit-Radio" holding:
  - Europa Plus Belarus (Miensk - 92.8 FM, Polatsk - 102.1 FM, Viciebsk - 97.8 FM)
  - Retro FM Belarus (Miensk 96.9 FM, Polatsk - 104.7 FM)

== Local state radio stations ==
- Pravda radio (FM-network in Homiel region) (state newspaper "Homelskaya Pravda")
- Radio 107,4 FM (Homiel - 107.4 FM, Zhlobyn - 107.6 FM) (state broadcasting)
- Radio Ranak (Svetlogorsk - 88.4 FM)
- Nelly - info (Mozyr - 102.7 FM)
- Minskaya volna (FM-network in Minsk region) (state newspaper "Minskaya Pravda")
- Maladechna FM (Maladechna - 89.2 FM) (state broadcasting)
- Center FM - Vector FM (Navapolacak - 107.0 FM (state broadcasting)
- Radio Naftan (Navapolacak - 98.1 FM) (Naftan state company)
- "Telecom-Garant" holding:
  - Radio Delta - Novoe Radio Russia (Viciebsk - 89.5 FM)
  - Radio Skif - Novoe Radio Russia (Vorsha - 99.9 FM)
- Russian Radio - Raduga Plus (Babruisk - 98.0 FM, Mahilou - 98.6 FM)
- Zefir FM (Babruisk - 95.4 FM) (state broadcasting)
- Baranovichi FM (Baranavichy - 100.0 FM) (state company)
- Svoyo radio (Pinsk - 106.1 FM) ("Varjag" mediaholding)
- MFM (Hrodna - 105.0 FM) (state broadcasting)
- LidaMediaCompany (state newspaper "Lidskaya Gazeta"):
  - Lider FM (Lida - 94.3 FM)
  - Tvoe radio (Lida - 100.6 FM)

== See also ==
- Media of Belarus
