= List of Irish language radio stations =

This is a list of the Irish language radio stations in Ireland.

== Irish-language radio stations ==
There are four radio stations that broadcast entirely in Irish:

=== National ===
- RTÉ Raidió na Gaeltachta (RnaG) - national radio station and part of the RTÉ group.

=== Youth ===
- Raidió Rí-Rá - a youth-oriented chart music station, currently broadcasting on the internet and in several places on DAB.

=== Generalist ===
- Raidió Na Life - broadcasting in the Greater Dublin area.
- Raidió Fáilte - broadcasting in the Greater Belfast area.

== See also ==
- List of Irish language media
- List of television channels available in the Republic of Ireland
