= Europa FM (Romania) =

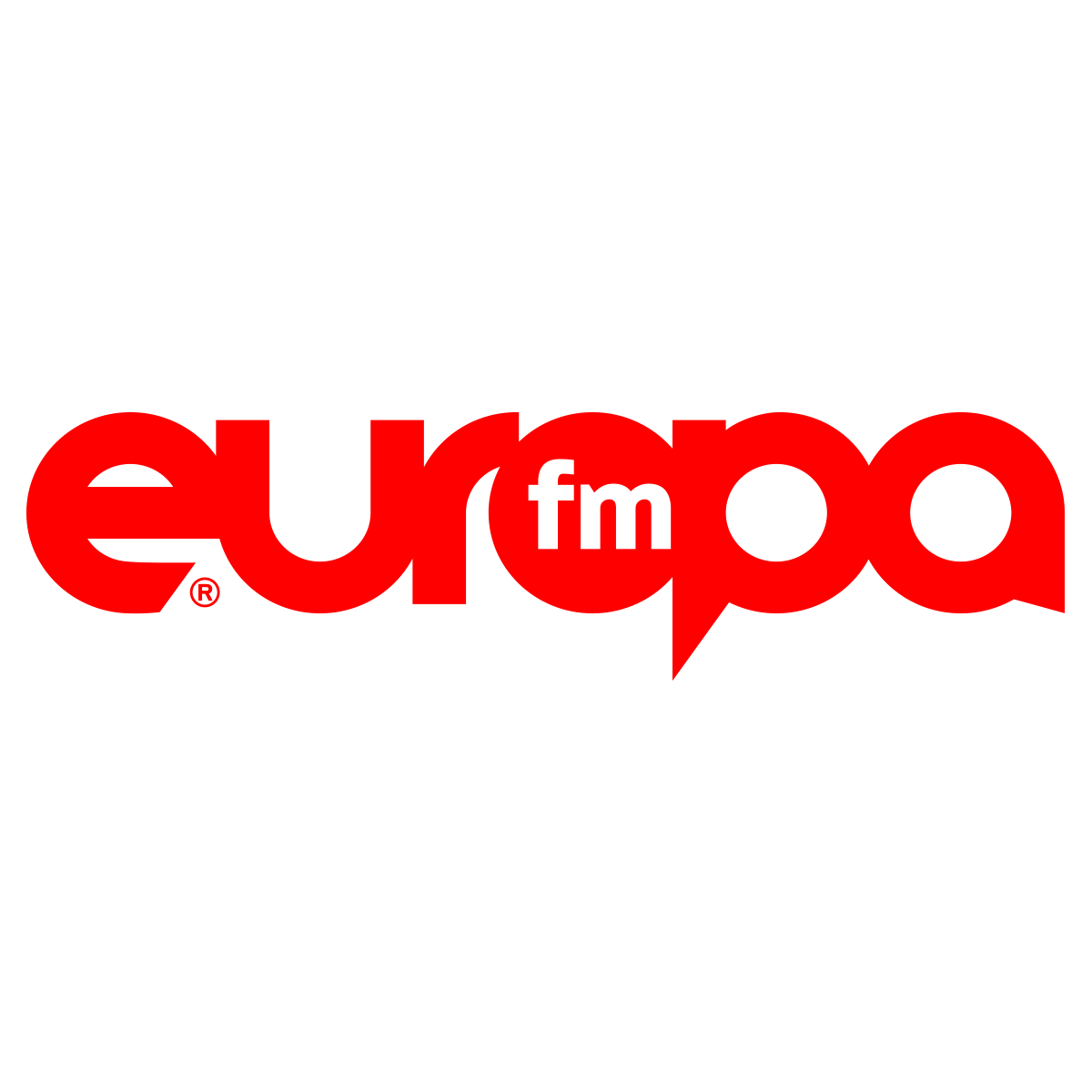
- Romania
- Broadcast area: Romania; Moldova; Hungary; Bulgaria; Serbia; Ukraine; Worldwide (Online)
- Frequency: FM 106.7 (Bucharest)

Programming
- Language: Romanian

Ownership
- Owner: Czech Media Invest
- Sister stations: One World Radio, Virgin Radio Romania

History
- First air date: 2000 (Bucharest, Romania)

Links
- Website: http://www.europafm.ro/

Europa FM is a Romanian radio station which started airing on 26 May 2000. Its programming consists of a variety of shows, including news, music and morning shows. It was previously owned by Lagardère Active, but has been owned by Czech Media Invest since 2018. A number of notable Romanian journalists have been part of the news team, including Andreea Esca, Cristian Tudor Popescu, and Cătălin Tolontan.
