= List of radio stations in Luxembourg =

This is an incomplete list of radio stations in Luxembourg. Luxembourg, as a multilingual country, has a range of media dedicated to each of the official languages: Luxembourgish, French, and German. In addition, there are also radio stations that broadcast in English and in Portuguese.

== Stations ==
Name	Main frequencies	Notes	Website
RTL Today Radio	93.3	Society and music in English	https://today.radio
Eldoradio	95.0 Bissen 105.0 Kirchberg 107.2 Belvaux	Hit music radio station	http://www.eldo.lu/
Radio Puls Luxembourg	internet	Music and news in Serbian	https://www.radiopuls.lu/
L'Essentiel Radio	107.7, 97.5	Music and news in French	http://www.lessentielradio.lu/
Radio 100,7	100.7 (Dudelange), 95.9	Cultural public radio	https://www.100komma7.lu/
Radio Aktiv	106.5 Echternach	Top 40 music station	https://www.radioaktiv106-5.org/
Radio ARA	102.9 Kirchberg	Indie music, interviews, International shows radio station	http://www.ara.lu/
Radio Belle Vallée	107.0 Belvaux	Luxembourgish & European music	http://www.RBV.lu
RTL Radio Letzebuerg	88.9 Dudelange 92.5 Hosingen	Info radio station	http://radio.rtl.lu/
Radio Gutt Laun	96.6 Esch/Alzette	Luxembourgish & European music	http://www.RGL.lu
RTL Radio	97.0	Feel good music in German	https://www.rtlradio.de/
Free Radio Luxembourg	Internet	The Hit music on the internet	https://www.frl.lu/

Radio Larochette

https://radiolarochette.com/ Best music best friends

== Luxembourgish language ==
- Radio Belle Vallée (FM 107.0, Belvaux): Luxembourgish and European music
- Radio Gutt Laun (FM 96.6, Esch/Alzette): Luxembourgish and European music

== German language ==
- RTL Radio: Adult contemporary "Feel good music"
- RPR1: Adult contemporary

== French language ==
- Bel RTL: Adult contemporary (from Belgium)
- L'Essentiel Radio: Adult contemporary
- Radio Contact: Hit music "Whatever Happens, Feel Good"
- RTL: Adult contemporary (from France)

== English language ==
- ARA City Radio: Rock
- RTL Today Radio: Hit and alternative music, interviews, talkshows. Luxembourg's only all-English station.

== Portuguese language ==
- Radio Amizade: Latin Music
- Radio Latina: Latin Music
- Radio Lusitana: Musica Portuguesa wwww.lusitanafm.lu

Rádio Larochette-https://radiolarochette.com/
