= List of radio stations in North Macedonia =

The following is a list of radio stations in North Macedonia.

== National coverage ==
Name
Antenna 5
Kanal 77
Makedonsko Radio 1
Makedonsko Radio 2
Makedonsko Radio 3
Metropolis Radio
Slobodna Makedonija (until 2018)

== Regional and local coverage ==
Place	Name	Frequency (MHz)
Berovo	Radio Sky	101,0
Bitola	Radio 105 Aktuel Bombarder	105,0
Bitola	Radio 106	106,6
Bitola	Radio B-97	94,4
Bitola	Radio Bitola	89,8; 95,8
Bitola	Radio Delfin	105,0
Centar Župa	Radio Semi	103,0
Debar	Radio Marilyn	104,7
Delčevo	Radio Tigar	93,8
Dolneni	Radio Besa	107,6
Dolneni	Radio Rinia 2000	107,2
Gevgelija	Radio Time FM	100.8
Gostivar	Pro FM	89,3
Gostivar	Radio Kometa	106,4
Kavadarci	Radio Galaxy	102,2
Kavadarci	Radio Hot FM	99,1
Kavadarci	Radio Kavadarci	99,1
Kičevo	Radio Akord	96,5
Kičevo	Radio Aleksandar Makedonski	106,0
Kičevo	Radio Kale	100,0
Kočani	Radio Rosa	98,1; 99,5
Radio Pik	98,9	
Kumanovo	City FM	97,9
Kumanovo	Radio Albana Kumanovë	99,3
Kumanovo	Radio Bravo	88,5
Kumanovo	Radio Jehona	103,5
Kumanovo	Radio KMR	104,2
Kumanovo	Radio Viva	95,0
Makedonski Brod	Radio Moris	100,2
Mavrovo and Rostuša	Radio Emi	93,7
Mavrovo and Rostuša	Radio Mis	103,5
Negotino	Energy Radio	91,7
Negotino	Radio Miks	100,5
Ohrid	MX Radio	101,2
Ohrid	Radio Lav	91,5
Ohrid	Radio Ohrid	89,0
Ohrid	Super Radio	97,0
Pehčevo	Radio Pehčevo	100,0
Plasnica	Radio Mis	103,0
Prilep	Radio 5 Čoki	89,5
Prilep	Radio Holiday	102,1
Prilep	Radio Meff	98,7
Prilep	Radio Ternipe	90,3
Radoviš	Alfa Radio	98,3
Skopje	Radio HIT	Internet Radio
Skopje	Club FM	103,4
Skopje	Star Radio (Urban Folk)	Internet Radio
Skopje	Jazz FM	100,8
Skopje	Kanal 103	103,0
Skopje	Life Radio	89,1
Skopje	Star Radio	Internet
Skopje	Radio Bubamara	105,2
Skopje	Radio Classic FM	90,8
Skopje	Radio Fortuna	96,8
Skopje	Radio Haracina	99,9
Skopje	Radio Ravel	96,0
Skopje	Radio Vati	88,4
Skopje	Sky Radio	102,5
Skopje	Sportsko radio	90,3
Skopje	Sportsko Radio Kanal 4	107,4
Skopje	Zona M1 Radio	104,4
Struga	Radio Drini	101,6
Struga	Radio 102KA	102,2
Struga	Radio Rrapi	107,5
Struga	Play Radio	90,4
Strumica	Ekspres Radio	101,1
Strumica	Hit Radio	88,1
Sveti Nikole	Radio Sveti Nikole	87,8
Sveti Nikole	Radio Modea	97,7
Štip	Radio Čerenja	106,4
Štip	Radio Štip	98,6; 99,2
Tetovo	Radio Bleta	101,0
Tetovo	Radio Fama Tetovë	97,5
Tetovo	Radio Focus Tetovë	98,0
Tetovo	Radio Kiss	104,7
Tetovo	Radio PlusForte	102,3
Tetovo	Radio Tetovo	93,5
Tetovo	Radio Visari	103,6
Veles	5 FM	107,1
Veles	CBM Radio	96,2
Veles	CD Radio	96,7
Veles	Radio Goldi	103,0
Vinica	Radio La Kosta	103,3
