= Adventist World Radio =

International religious broadcasting service

- Country: United States
- Availability: Africa, Asia/Pacific, Europe
- Motto: From Broadcast to Baptism
- Headquarters: 12501 Old Columbia Pike Silver Spring, Maryland 20904 USA
- Owner: Seventh-day Adventist Church
- Established: 1971
- Webcast: awr.org/listen
- Official website: awr.org

Adventist World Radio (AWR) is the official international broadcasting service and mission radio arm of the Seventh-day Adventist Church. Based in the United States, AWR is a non-profit organization which aims to use radio broadcasts as the primary means to share the teachings of Jesus to unreached people groups worldwide which are inaccessible to traditional missionaries. AWR hopes to eventually broadcast in over 200 languages identified as critically important for effective evangelism. In addition to AM, FM, and SW (shortwave) radio broadcasts, AWR also utilizes podcasts, social media, Godpods, and in-person evangelism efforts.

== History ==
=== Origins ===
In 1969, the General Conference of Seventh-day Adventists established a committee to explore the feasibility of establishing a worldwide shortwave broadcasting service. The proposal had been suggested by several individuals, including H.M.S. Richards, Sr., the founder of the Voice of Prophecy radio program.

Prior to this initiative, the church had been broadcasting into Europe from a commercial station located in Tangier. However, this station ceased operations following a change in the Moroccan government, and the transmitter was relocated. The station's owner subsequently planned to construct a larger and more advanced broadcasting facility in Portugal and extended an invitation to the General Conference to utilize the new station once it was operational. By 1969, construction of this station was underway, with broadcasts expected to commence in the fall of 1970. This development served as the catalyst for the General Conference Communication Department (formerly known as Radio/TV) to initiate the concept that would later become Adventist World Radio. Adrian Peterson was the one who proposed the AWR name to Walter Scragg.

=== Timeline ===
From its first broadcast on October 1, 1971, AWR has aired programs to unreached people groups around the world in their native languages. This chronological overview highlights key events, milestones, and developments in the history of AWR.

- 1970s
  - 1971: Adventist World Radio (AWR) was established when the Seventh-day Adventist Church began leasing shortwave airtime from Radio Trans Europe in Sines, Portugal, initially broadcasting programs in Italian language to Italy.
  - 1976: AWR programs in Southern Asia, specifically from Sri Lanka, in ten languages, became part of the organization's efforts and were designated as AWR Asia.
  - 1978: Spanish-language broadcasts commenced from Guatemala to reach audiences in Central and South America.
  - 1979: The first FM radio station was established in Florence. It was the first privately operated radio station in Europe that was run full-time by the Adventist Church. Adventist World Radio (AWR) conducted experimental relays from two locations in Europe: Radio Andorra and Radio Luxembourg.
- 1980s
  - 1983: AWR launched its first broadcasts from Moyabi. These broadcasts were transmitted in the French language from Monday to Saturday.
  - 1984: Adventist World Radio started broadcasting in Nairobi, Kenya.
  - 1985: AWR constructed a shortwave station in Italy, and commenced broadcasts to Europe and North Africa in Arabic and French. The station remained operational until 2001. Additionally, AWR Latin America established its headquarters in Alajuela, Costa Rica, initiating regular broadcasts to Central and South America. This regional division was later renamed AWR Americas. Furthermore, AWR received an offering from the Seventh-day Adventist Church's world session to fund a major initiative targeting China; construction began on a shortwave station located on the island of Guam in the Pacific Ocean. This new station in Guam was officially named as AWR-Asia while the station in India which was originally AWR-Asia was officially renamed as AWR-Southern Asia.
  - 1987: In Guam, two 100 kW transmitters equipped with curtain antennas and over 300-foot towers commenced broadcasting in eleven languages across Asia.
  - 1988: AWR began broadcasting English-language programs to West Africa through Moyabi on Sundays.
- 1990s
  - 1990: Voice of Hope secured its inaugural 20-minute broadcast from a private home studio, becoming the first religious station to air programming amid political unrest, a year before the collapse of the Soviet Union.
  - 1992: AWR launched transmissions from Russia. These broadcasts marked the first western transmissions originating from Moscow.
  - 1993: The Voice of Hope, known as Ashar Bani in the Bangla language, is produced in a studio established by AWR. The first Bangla program was aired to begin this broadcasting effort.
  - 1994: The AWR-Africa transmissions from Moyabi ceased after an eleven-year period.
  - 1996: AWR reached its 25th anniversary. The Italian government enacted legislation permitting nonprofit organizations to operate shortwave radio stations in 1995. Subsequently, under this law, Adventist World Radio (AWR) was granted a shortwave broadcasting license in 1996.
- 2000s
  - 2000: AWR launched its first live satellite broadcast on the Voice of Hope Network for Europe, marking its debut in live transmissions via satellite for rebroadcast on FM stations. The organization broadcasts shortwave programs from stations in Guam, Germany, Italy, Madagascar, Slovakia, and South Africa, and provides satellite service to over 50 stations across the Americas and Europe. Additionally, AWR established a 24-hour satellite radio service covering Europe, North Africa, and the Middle East, supported by the new AWR Europe satellite network, its second international satellite infrastructure.
  - 2001: Following the overturning of plans to build a shortwave station in Argenta, Italy, AWR leased airtime on a station in the United Arab Emirates. This enabled AWR to broadcast 18 hours daily to the Middle East, Central Asia, and East Africa.
  - 2003: Adventist World Radio (AWR) in Tanzania expanded its programming by including shows produced in the Maasai language. The goal of establishing AWR Maasai was to reach the semi-nomadic Maasai tribes. Adventist World Radio added broadcasts in two languages, Mizo and Assamese, which were produced in the newly inaugurated studios in Aizawl on February 27, 2003. AWR also added broadcasts in the Khmer language. This expanded the total number of languages in which AWR broadcast to approximately 55.
  - 2005: The Guam station was rededicated in 2005 following a multi-phase modernization project, which expanded its potential audience to approximately 3.5 billion listeners in Asia. AWR's radio station in northern Cameroon was established, and its broadcasts were in the Fulfude language.
  - 2007: AWR initiated a pilot project to distribute MegaVoice Ambassadors, solar-powered audio players capable of holding up to 160 hours of recordings. The first devices were delivered to Bible workers in South Sudan and North Africa.
  - 2009: The Voice of Hope Media Center in Russia received a prestigious award from the country's parliament, recognizing it as a Socially Aware Enterprise.
- 2010s
  - 2010: AWR launched a comprehensive podcasting service, making all programs in all languages available online worldwide. The organization invested significantly in a Media Asset Management (MAM) system called Mediator, which enabled automatic repurposing of radio programs into podcasts. Voice of Hope, operating from its studios in Tula south of Moscow, provided radio programming broadcast on more than 1,000 stations.
  - 2011: AWR began partnering with Spain to operate several Mediterranean-based FM stations aimed at reaching North Africa, broadcasting programs in Arabic, Berber, Tachelhit, Kabyle, and more. In July 2011, AWR began broadcasting new shortwave programs in Arabic for four hours daily—morning and evening—to listeners in countries such as Egypt, Syria, Jordan, Iraq, Yemen, Oman, and Saudi Arabia. AWR played a key role in facilitating the creation of PT Radio Naik Nafiri (RAN FM), which was officially established on September 23, 2011. The station began broadcasting on 90.6 FM from Warembungan, near Manado.
  - 2012: An FM station in Hyderabad, India, aired the country's first Adventist program, produced by AWR in Telugu. Previously, Indian listeners accessed AWR via shortwave, on-demand, or podcasts in 13 languages. The church's radio ministry also signed a contract with an Indian broadcaster for an initial series of 11 programs.
  - 2013: A major upgrade was completed on AWR's shortwave station in Guam, featuring a new 229-foot tower and high-frequency antenna, which enhanced signal reach into deeper parts of Asia and allowed coverage of multiple countries simultaneously. Amharic, Somali, Punjabi, and Urdu were added to the list of languages AWR broadcast in.
  - 2015: AWR launched AWR-102.9 Light FM, The Voice of Hope Radio, on March 21, with Dowell Chow, and received licensing from the Uganda Communications Commission.
  - 2016: AWR, through the East-Central Africa Division (ECD), donated a generator, STL, a 3-kilowatt FM transmitter, and four pairs of antennas with their connectors to the AWR-102.9 Light FM radio station. These contributions expanded the station's transmission range and addressed power challenges, thereby enhancing the stability of the radio station.
  - 2017: Dowell Chow retired in January, and Duane McKey became President, introducing the new slogan AWR360º – From Broadcast to Baptism. AWR began broadcasting over local radio airwaves in Mindoro in 2017 as part of an Adventist Church initiative known as Total Member Involvement evangelism.
  - 2018: AWR360º facilitated 1,000 evangelistic meetings simultaneously happening across Lusaka, Zambia. Plans were initiated to establish an AWR360º Center for Digital Evangelism (CDE) in the Philippines. AWR implemented the Dalet Galaxy system for media management. The Majuro radio station is established. The Seventh-day Adventist Church in the Dutch Caribbean territory established its first radio station on the island of Bonaire. AWR provided broadcasting equipment for the new studio. AWR played a crucial role in the launch of Adventist Radio London (ARL), providing funding and equipment support that helped the station go live on Digital Audio Broadcasting (DAB) on April 8, 2018. The station, which features a 'Sunday Breakfast' show hosted by two millennials, received its Ofcom license in August 2017, with leadership backing from the Adventist Church's world headquarters.
  - 2019: The Arusha Training Meeting in Tanzania gathered over 90 producers from across Africa, resulting in 1,526 baptisms. The coverage expanded with new stations in the Democratic Republic of the Congo, Tanzania, and Uganda. The new theme song, Airwaves of Love, was released. The AWR360 Philippines - From Guns to Bibles production received a Bronze Telly Award in the Charitable/Not-For-Profit & Cause Marketing — Television category in The Telly Awards.
- 2020s
  - 2020: Unlocking Bible Prophecies by Cami Oetman debuted worldwide in May and was followed by the Unlocking Bible Prophecies 1.0 series in June. From October 3–17, an updated Unlocking Bible Prophecies 2.0 series aired globally in multiple languages, including Arabic, English, Spanish, Portuguese, Ukrainian, Russian, German, Romanian, Mandarin, Estonian, Bahasa Indonesia, Mongolian, Tamil, Telugu, Hindi, Marathi, Malayalam, Bengali, Mizo, Bhojpuri, Malagasy, and Afrikaans. Additionally, Earth's Final Countdown featuring President Duane McKey was launched. In February 2020, Khemnel Radio, operated by the Mongolia Mission of Seventh-day Adventists and supported by AWR, won the National Best Children's Content for Radio award at a contest hosted by Mongolian Prime Minister Ukhnaagiin Khurelsukh. The station's children's program was selected from over ten entries, receiving 10 million tughriks (approximately US$3,600).
  - 2021: AWR celebrated its 50th anniversary. In March 2021, Unlocking Bible Prophecies International debuted on AWR's website. Many top NPA (New People's Army) communist rebels in Mindoro surrendered after listening to AWR programs; over 700 former rebels were baptized in December, bringing reconciliation and peace to the island. AWR received a total of seven Telly Awards in 2021, recognizing excellence in various categories of online broadcasting and content. The awards included a Gold Telly for The Executioner in the People's Telly category, along with multiple Silver and Bronze Tellys for productions such as The Executioner, No Man Did This!, The Signs, and The Costliest Gift across categories including online series, not-for-profit and fundraising, religion and spirituality, documentary, and motion graphics. On October 10, 2021, the Namibia North Conference of the Seventh-day Adventist Church, in partnership with AWR, distributed 2,000 "Godpods" to the Rukwangali community, Namibia's second-largest population group. These solar-powered devices, roughly the size of a cellphone, contain audio Bibles in local languages and English, Voice of Prophecy Bible lessons, and music, functioning also as FM radio receivers.
  - 2022: AWR dedicated an evangelistic center in Nazareth, Israel. AWR purchased a new radio station in Bogotá, Colombia. AWR participated in the Virtual Exhibition at the 61st General Conference Session, held June 6–11, 2022. AWR received five Telly Awards in 2022, recognizing excellence across various categories. The awards included two Silver Tellys for Tarin's Amazing Transformation in the Online General-Not-for-Profit and Fundraising category and The Power of Forgiveness in the Television General-Drama category. Additionally, the organization earned three Bronze Tellys for Tarin's Amazing Transformation in Online Craft—Videography/Cinematography, The Power of Forgiveness in Television General-Religious/Spiritual, and Three Amazing Women of Prayer in Online General-Not-for-Profit and Fundraising.
  - 2023: Senator Lorena Ríos Cuéllar recognized the Seventh-day Adventist Church for its contributions, coinciding with the 2022 launch of Esperanza Colombia Radio 96.3 FM in Zipaquirá, supported by Adventist World Radio, which reaches 14 million people in Bogotá. Christ for Europe evangelistic meetings, supported by AWR, took place in May and September. AWR and the Central Mindanao Mission completed a successful evangelism campaign in San Fernando and Sitio Natampod, Brgy. Namnam, resulting in 1,729 baptisms. AWR received six Telly Awards in 2023, recognizing excellence in various categories. The organization secured a Gold Telly for Martin's Story in the Religion/Spirituality—Non-Broadcast category. Additionally, it earned four Silver Tellys for Martin's Story and Her Life Was Shattered . . . in the Virtual Art Direction—Non-Broadcast categories, as well as Her Life Was Shattered . . . and From Bitterness to Forgiveness in the Religion/Spirituality—Non-Broadcast and Editing—Television categories. A Bronze Telly was awarded to From Bitterness to Forgiveness in the Religious/Spiritual—Television category.
  - 2024: AWR established the DWAV 89.1 FM station in Manila, Philippines. AWR received seven Telly Awards in 2024, including a Silver Telly for The Right Arm of the Gospel in the People's Telly—General Non-Broadcast category. It also earned Silver Tellys for Can God "Convert" Chickens? in the General-Online Series, Shows & Segments category, and for From Assassin to Follower of Jesus in the General-Religion & Spirituality and Craft-Directing categories. Additional Silver Tellys were awarded to Can God "Convert" Chickens? in the General-Religion & Spirituality and Not-for-Profit categories, as well as to An Awakening in Europe in the General-Religion & Spirituality category. AWR held a training program in Bangkok, aimed at enabling its team to produce and broadcast content in 100 languages worldwide. The program was primarily attended by participants from the Asia/Pacific region—including Southern Asia, Northern Asia-Pacific, the South Pacific, and Chinese territories. AWR launched Internet broadcasting in the Ukrainian language from Chernivtsi, Ukraine. The station began continuous, 24-hour broadcasting on May 1, 2024.

== Languages ==
Based on the March 30 to October 25, 2025 Program Schedule, AWR broadcasts content in various languages through local radio stations and podcasts.

=== Europe ===
Arabic, Berber, English, Romanian, Slovenian, Spanish

=== Africa ===
Ateso, Bassa, Bemba, Beti, Chichewa, Ekegusii, English, French, Fulfulde, Gha, Hausa, Igbu, Juba Arabic, Kikamba, Kinyarwanda, Kiswahili, Lenje, Lingala, Luganda, Lukonzo, Luo, Lusoga, Luyira, Maasai, Malagasy, Rubwisi, Rundi, Runyakitara, Swahili, Tonga, Twi, Yoruba

=== Asia/Pacific ===
Bicol, English, Cebuano, Hindi, Igorot, Ilocano, Indonesian, Japanese, Mongolian, Portuguese, Samoan, Tagalog, Telugu, Tetum, Thai

=== Podcast Only ===
Arabic, Armenian, Azerbaijani, Bosnian, Bulgarian, Cantonese Chinese, English, German, Indonesian, Japanese, Kazakh, Kyrgyz, Marathi, Nepali, Persian Farsi, Polish, Portuguese, Romanian, Russian, Spanish, Swahili, Tamil, Thai, Uyghur, Ukrainian, Uzbek

== Programs ==
Radio is an effective way of transmission, especially in places where AWR's online broadcasts are inaccessible. AWR and its affiliate radio stations have programs that cover themes such as family life, health, and spirituality. Instrumental music and songs are also part of the programs. Research shows that listeners have been positively influenced by AWR's broadcasts.

AWR adopted the melody "Jesus is Coming Again" as the theme music for its initial broadcasts. This tune was originally associated with the "Voice of Prophecy" program hosted by H.M.S. Richards, Sr., and the tune remains the signature music for all AWR broadcasts.

=== Shortwave DX Program ===
Wavescan is AWR's weekly program designed for shortwave listeners and DX enthusiasts, focusing on the field of international broadcasting in the USA, Africa and Europe. Dr. Adrian M. Peterson, who is also a DXer and radio historian, is the producer of this program.

The program features historical segments that explore various aspects of radio broadcasting, alongside current updates and interviews. Additionally, each episode includes a shortwave news report contributed by correspondents from different regions worldwide. Each episode is released weekly with the average length of each episode being 29 minutes.

Similar programs include AWR French, AWR Kabyle, AWR Yoruba, AWR Burmese, AWR Karen, AWR Nepali, AWR Lao, AWR Persian, AWR Russian, AWR Panjabi, AWR Tigrinya, AWR Korean, AWR Tamil, AWR Turkish, AWR Mongolian, AWR Urdu.

== Studios ==
Adventist World Radio (AWR) has produced its shortwave programs through a network of studios around the world. These include both production and coordinating studios, often located in countries where the target languages are spoken. The first coordinating studio was in 1971 on the top floor of an apartment building on Rua Braamcamp in Lisbon, Portugal. Allen and Andrea Steele set up the first programs there for AWR's initial broadcasts over Radio Trans Europe's 250 kW shortwave transmitter at Sines. This location appears on one of AWR's early QSL cards.

The coordinating role then moved to Forli, Italy, where it was combined with a small shortwave and FM station. Later, it was transferred to Darmstadt, Germany, which still hosts the AWR Frequency Management office, led by Claudius Dedio. Eventually, the studio functions were moved to a permanent building called Whitegates, near Newbold College in Berkshire, England.

Over the years, many studios in Europe, Africa, and Asia have created programs for broadcast in local languages. For example, the studios in Hong Kong and Yokohama produce Chinese and Japanese programs, broadcast from Guam's KSDA station—Allen and Andrea Steele supervised its construction. In India, the Pune studio has made programs in ten different languages. Additional studios are located in Dhaka (Bangladesh), Yangon (Myanmar), Lahore (Pakistan), and Colombo (Sri Lanka). The studio in Northeast India opened in Aizawl. In Africa, studios are in Abidjan (Ivory Coast), Accra (Ghana), Nairobi (Kenya), and Morogoro (Tanzania). Some studios in different countries, such as Paris, Pune, Seoul, Bratislava, and Antananarivo, have issued their own QSL cards. Some listeners have received these cards as proof of reception.

== Publications ==
Allen Steele has written two books about AWR in a narrative literary style. The books titled Loud Let It Ring! and God's Air Force were published by the Pacific Press Publishing Association in 2023.

== Funding ==
Adventist World Radio is primarily funded through gifts received from individual donors.

== Key people ==
=== Founding members ===
Ron Myers served as the Portugal Coordinator for Adventist World Radio.

The Adventist World Radio Board (1980–1985) board members included 23 individuals.

- Neal C. Wilson (Chairman)
- Lowell L. Bock (Vice Chairman)
- Tulio R. Haylock (Secretary)
- William L. Murrill (Treasurer)
- Bert B. Beach
- Olav Blomquist
- Charles E. Bradford
- George W. Brown
- Lance L. Butler
- James E. Chase
- Gerald J. Christo
- Winston T. Clark
- Gerald F. Fuller
- Bekele Heye
- Robert Kloosterhuis
- Edwin Ludescher
- Kenneth J. Mittleider
- Keith S. Parmenter
- Harold Reiner
- Walter R. L. Scragg
- J. Robert Spangler
- G. Ralph Thompson
- Joao Wolff

=== Current Leadership ===
As of 2025, the following people comprise the leadership of Adventist World Radio.

James (Jim) Howard, President; Cami Oetman, Executive Vice President; Ray Allen, General Vice President; Michael Eckert; Charné Renou, Vice President for Finance; Justin Ringstaff

== Collaborations ==
=== MegaVoice ===
AWR provides content in select languages on self-contained digital audio players known as MegaVoice Ambassadors or Envoys. These devices are preloaded with up to 500 hours of recordings, including portions of the Bible, sermons, Bible studies, stories, health messages, other community interest topics, and hymns. They have been distributed to the Huichol indigenous people in the Sierra Madre mountains of Mexico, the Yemba-speaking Bamileke people of Cameroon, as well as communities in Nepal, Myanmar, the Democratic Republic of the Congo, and other regions. These devices are especially valuable in rural, isolated areas where power is unavailable or unreliable, and in regions with restrictions on the free exercise of Christianity. According to company officers, MegaVoice players can reach places where no other device or method is permitted, effectively sharing the gospel in countries and regions where acknowledgment of Christianity may be restricted or dangerous.

=== The Philippine Government & Adventist Laymen's Services and Industries (ASI) ===
AWR collaborates with the Philippine government and the nongovernmental organization Adventist Laymen's Services and Industries (ASI) member Farm Stew. The partnership aims to help former rebels earn a livelihood through farming. The government has provided plots of farmland to these individuals, and together with Farm Stew, will assist them in learning sustainable farming practices and healthy living. Robert B. Dulay, a pastor and the AWR Asia-Pacific Region Director, aided in the rebels' surrender to the government.

== See also ==
- Seventh-day Adventist Church
- Religious broadcasting
- Christian radio
