= List of radio stations in Latvia =

== Radio Groups ==
- LSM
  - Latvijas Radio 1: Talk and news
  - Latvijas Radio 2: Latvian music and news
  - Latvijas Radio 3 - Klasika: Classical music and news
  - Latvijas Radio 5: Top 40
  - Latvijas Radio 6 - Radio NABA: Student radio, alternative, classic rock, jazz, electro (Riga 95.8 FM)
- SWH Group
  - Radio SWH - Hot Adult Contemporary
  - SWH Plus - Russian language music hits (in Russian language)
  - SWH Rock - Rock music
  - SWH LV - Latvian music from all times (Riga 100.0 FM, Liepaja 105.8 FM, Ventspils 104.5 FM)
  - SWH Gold - Soft Pop, Lounge un Contemporary Easy Listening from all times (Riga 90.0 FM and Saldus 104.4 FM)
  - SWH Spin - Students radio and new music hits (Liepaja 94.6 FM and Ventspils 99.9 FM)
- EHR Group
  - Radio EHR - Top 40 and new music
  - SuperHits - Hit music last decades
  - Latviešu Hiti - Latvian music
  - EHR Plus - New music hits (in Russian language) (Riga 96.2 FM, Jelgava 95.5 FM and Liepaja 87.7 FM)
  - Retro FM Latvia - Retro music (in Russian language) (Riga 94.5 FM, Liepaja 92.3 FM, Daugavpils 99.4 FM and Rezekne 105.5 FM)
- Skonto Media Group
  - Radio Skonto - Pop music and news
  - Radio TEV - Hot Adult Contemporary
  - Skonto LV - Latvian music (planned Liepaja 102.1 FM and Ventspils 95.3 FM)
  - Lounge FM - Lounge&Jazz music (Riga 99.5 FM)
  - Chillax FM - Universal radio station (Riga 99.0 FM)
  - Radio Skonto Plus - Pop music (in Russian language) (Riga 102.3 FM)
- TV3 Group
  - Star FM - Hot Adult Contemporary
  - Radio 3 (planned Riga 107.7 FM)
  - Top Radio - Dance music/Russian hits (in Russian language)
- Mix Media Group
  - Relax FM - Easy music (Riga 94.9 FM, Valmiera 95.9 FM, Dobele 88.4 FM and Jelgava 98.0 FM)
  - Avtoradio - Music hits (in Russian language) (Riga 103.2 and Kraslava 96.1 FM)
  - Radio Melodija - Adult Contemporary (in Russian language) (Riga 93.9 FM and Ventspils 88.5 FM)
  - Radio Roks - Russian rock (in Russian language) (Riga 88.6 FM)
  - Mix FM - Dance Music (Riga 102.7 FM)

== Religious, regional and local radio stations ==
- Latvijas Kristīgais Radio - Christian news, music and talk
- Radio Marija Latvija - Religious
- Kurzemes Radio - Hot Adult Contemporary, news from Kurzeme region
- Latgolys radeja - Music and talk in Latgalian dialect (Daugavpils 95.2 FM, Jekabpils 95.8 FM, Rezekne 103.0 FM and Balvi 99.5 FM)
- Divu Krastu Radio - Popular music from the 70s-90s (Rezekne 89.4 FM, Daugavpils 90.1 FM and Jekabpils 96.9 FM)
- Radio 1 - Hot AC and news (Jekabpils 107.0 FM and Preili 91.6 FM)
- BBC World Service - BBC International radio (in English language) (Riga 100.5 FM)
- Radio Ef-Ei - Music and talk (Rezekne 91.4 FM)
- Radio Rezekne - Music and news (in Russian language) (Rezekne 105.1 FM)
- Alise Plus - Music and news (in Russian language) (Daugavpils 101.6 FM)

== Internet radio stations ==
- Your City Radio
- XO FM
- XRadio (in Russian language)
- Power FM (in Russian language)
- Radio OMH
- Radio Oira
- Norma Radio
- Nordic Chillout Radio
- NJoy Radio
- New Dance Radio (in Russian language)
- Lustigs Radio
- LRadio Baltija
- LRMA Rock Radio
- Latvia Rock Radio
- G radio Mix
  - G radio One
- Flash Sound (in Russian language)
- Radio Energy.LV Hit Music
  - Radio Energy.LV Russian (in Russian language)
- Chaos Radio (in English language)
