= List of Danish-language radio stations =

This is a list of Danish radio stations broadcasting in the Danish language.

== National ==
=== DR ===
- DR P1
- DR P2
- DR P3
- DR P4
- DR P5
- DR P6 Beat
- DR P8 Jazz

Discontinued:

- DR P7 Mix

=== Bauer Media Group ===
Source:<ref>"Radiostationer - Bauer Media". bauermedia.dk (in Danish).</ref

- The Voice
- Radio 100
- NOVA
- Radio Soft
- Pop FM
- myROCK
- Radio Klassisk

=== Others ===
- Radio IIII

Discontinued:

- MTV Radio
- NRJ
- Rise FM Denmark

== Local and regional ==
=== Mediehuset Midtjyllands Avis ===
- Radio Silkeborg
- Radio Alfa Silkeborg
- Radio Solo

=== Sjællandske Medier ===
- Radio SLR
- Radio Køge

=== Jysk Fynske Medier ===
- Skala FM
- Radio VLR
- Classic FM
- Radio Viborg
- Pulz FM

=== Others ===
- Din Radio
- Globus Guld
- Hvidovre NærRadio
- Radio ABC
- Radio Als
- Radio Diablo
- Radio Globus
- Radio Go FM
- Radio Hinnerup
- Radio Køge
- Radio Limfjord
- Radio Max Danmark
- Radio Nord
- Radio Nordjyske
- Radio Skive
- Radio SydhavsØerne
- Radio Viborg
- Radio Victoria
- Radio WMR
- Radio OZ-Viola
- Øst FM
- Vendsyssel FM
- Voksenradio DK
