= List of radio stations in Kyiv =

This is a list of radio stations in Kyiv, Ukraine. There are 27 radio stations in Ukraine.

== Radio Stations ==
Frequency	Station	Format	Owner	Website	City
88.4 MHz	Pryamiy FM (planned)	News, live events, talk-shows	Volodymyr Makeyenko	Web Stream	Kyiv, Ukraine
92.4 MHz	Retro FM	Classic Hits	United Media Holding Radiogroup	Web Stream	Kyiv, Ukraine
92.8 MHz	NRJ	Top 40, Adult Contemporary	United Media Holding Radiogroup	Web Stream	Kyiv, Ukraine
93.8 MHz	Business Radio	Dance, Pop, Disco, Blues	Business Radio Group	Web Stream	Kyiv, Ukraine
94.2 MHz	Radio Maximum FM	Various	JSC Lux	Web Stream	Kyiv, Ukraine
94.6 MHz	Army FM	News, information, music	Ministry of Defence of Ukraine	Web Stream	Kyiv, Ukraine
95.2 MHz	Melodia FM	Retro/Disco	TAVR Media	Web Stream	Kyiv, Ukraine
95.6 MHz	Jam FM	Pop/Rock	United Media Holding Radiogroup	Web Stream	Kyiv, Ukraine
96.0 MHz	Radio NV	News and Talk	Dragon Capital/NV	Web Stream	Kyiv, Ukraine
96.4 MHz	Hit FM	Modern music, Top 40	TAVR Media	Web Stream	Kyiv, Ukraine
96.8 MHz	DJ FM	Dance	Business Radio Group	Web Stream	Kyiv, Ukraine
97.2 MHz	UA:Radio Promin	Music, Information	National Public Broadcasting Company of Ukraine (UA:PBC)	Web Stream	Kyiv, Ukraine
97.6 MHz	UA:Radio Kultura	Culture, Education, Theatre, Actual events, Human rights	National Public Broadcasting Company of Ukraine (UA:PBC)	Web Stream	Kyiv, Ukraine
98.0 MHz	Kyiv FM	Folk songs, Hits music, News, Information	Kyiv City Council	Web Stream	Kyiv, Ukraine
98.5 MHz	Russian Radio	Old hits	TAVR Media	Web Stream	Kyiv, Ukraine
99.0 MHz	Radio Nostalgie	Modern music	Serhiy Goroviy	Web Stream	Kyiv, Ukraine
99.4 MHz	Hromadske Radio (planned)	Talk, News, Human rights, Analytics	Hromadske Radio organisation	Web Stream	Kyiv, Ukraine
100.0 MHz	Kraina FM	Ukraininan music	RadioCorp	Web Stream	Kyiv, Ukraine
100.5 MHz	Radio Miami	Hip-Hop, R&B	Prosto Group		Kyiv, Ukraine
101.1 MHz	Radio Pyatnica	Pop music	United Media Holding Radiogroup	Web Stream	Kyiv, Ukraine
101.5 MHz	Radio Relax	Easy Listening	TAVR Media	Web Stream	Kyiv, Ukraine
101.9 MHz	Radio Shanson	Russian Shanson	Business Radio Group	Web Stream	Kyiv, Ukraine
102.5 MHz	Prosto Radi.O	Rock	Prosto Group	Web Stream	Kyiv, Ukraine
103.1 MHz	Lux FM	Pop music	JSC Lux	Web Stream	Kyiv, Ukraine
103.6 MHz	Radio ROKS	Rock	TAVR Media	Web Stream	Kyiv, Ukraine
104.0 MHz	Power FM	CHR, News and Information	Business Radio Group	Web Stream	Kyiv, Ukraine
104.6 MHz	Radio Jazz	Jazz music	TAVR Media	Web Stream	Kyiv, Ukraine
105.0 MHz	UA:Ukrainian Radio - Voice of Kyiv	News, Talk and Information	National Public Broadcasting Company of Ukraine (UA:PBC)	Web Stream	Kyiv, Ukraine
105.5 MHz	Stilnoe Radio - Perec.FM	World music	1st Ukrainian Radio Group	Web Stream	Kyiv, Ukraine
106.0 MHz	Lounge FM	Electronics, Pop hits	United Media Holding Radiogroup	Web Stream	Kyiv, Ukraine
106.5 MHz	Kiss FM	Electronics/Top 40	TAVR Media	Web Stream	Kyiv, Ukraine
107.0 MHz	Europa plus	Top 40/Pop	Europa plus Ukraine	Web Stream	Kyiv, Ukraine
107.9 MHz	Nashe Radio	Modern music	TAVR Media	Web Stream	Kyiv, Ukraine
