= List of radio stations in Georgia (country) =

The following is a list of 35 FM radio stations in Tbilisi, Georgia, which were broadcasting as of 30 September 2017.

== FM stations ==
FM frequency (MHz)	Name	Georgian Name	Covered Location
92.30 MHz	Radio Tanamgzavri	რადიო თანამგზავრი	Tbilisi, Georgia
93.10 MHz	Qartuli Vinili	ქართული ვინილი	Tbilisi, Georgia
93.50 MHz	Radio Tbilisi	რადიო თბილისი	Tbilisi, Georgia
93.90 MHz	Star FM	სტარ FM	Tbilisi, Georgia
94.30 MHz	Radio Jukebox	ჯუკბოქს რადიო	Tbilisi, Georgia
94.70 MHz	Radio Maestro	რადიო მაესტრო	Tbilisi, Georgia
95.10 MHz	AutoRadio	ავტორადიო	Tbilisi, Georgia
95.50 MHz	Radio Comersant	რადიო კომერსანტი	Tbilisi, Georgia
95.90 MHz	Radio Muza	რადიო მუზა	Tbilisi, Georgia
96.30 MHz	Radio Jako	რადიო ჯაკო	Tbilisi, Georgia
96.70 MHz	Radio Ar Daidardo	რადიო არ დაიდარდო	Tbilisi, Georgia
97.10 MHz	Radio DardiMandi	რადიო დარდიმანდი	Tbilisi, Georgia
97.50 MHz	Jazz FM	ჯაზ FM	Tbilisi, Georgia
98.1 MHz	Radio Ucnobi FM	რადიო უცნობი	Tbilisi, Georgia
98.50 MHz	Radio Tskheli Shokoladi	რადიო ცხელი შოკოლადი	Tbilisi, Georgia
98.90 MHz	Voice of Abkhazia	აფხაზეთის ხმა	Tbilisi, Georgia
99.30 MHz	Folk Radio	ფოლკ რადიო	Tbilisi, Georgia
99.70 MHz	Radio Vinil	რადიო ვინილი	Tbilisi, Georgia
100.30 MHz	Med FM	მედ FM	Tbilisi, Georgia
100.90 MHz	Public Radio 2	საზოგადოებრივი რადიო 2	Tbilisi, Georgia
101.30 MHz	Radio Monte Carlo	რადიო მონტე–კარლო	Tbilisi, Georgia
101.90 MHz	Radio Kalaki	რადიო ქალაქი	Tbilisi, Georgia
102.40 MHz	Public Radio 1	საზოგადოებრივი რადიო 1	Tbilisi, Georgia
102.90 MHz	RFI-Radio France Internationale	საფრანგეთის საერთაშორისო რადიო	Tbilisi, Georgia
103.40 MHz	Radio Fortuna Plus	რადიო ფორტუნა პლუს	Tbilisi, Georgia
103.90 MHz	Radio Palitra	რადიო პალიტრა	Tbilisi, Georgia
104.30 MHz	Radio Positive	რადიო პოზიტივი	Tbilisi, Georgia
104.70 MHz	OK FM	ოკ FM	Tbilisi, Georgia
105.00 MHz	Radio 105	რადიო 105	Tbilisi, Georgia
105.40 MHz	Radio Iveria	რადიო ივერია	Tbilisi, Georgia
105.90 MHz	Radio Imedi	რადიო იმედი	Tbilisi, Georgia
106.40 MHz	Pirveli Radio	პირველი რადიო	Tbilisi, Georgia
106.90 MHz	Radio Fortuna	რადიო ფორტუნა	Tbilisi, Georgia
107.40 MHz	Radio Tavisupleba	რადიო თავისუფლება	Tbilisi, Georgia
107.90 MHz	Radio Saqartvelos Khma	რადიო საქართველოს ხმა	Tbilisi, Georgia
