= Polskie Radio Program IV =

Polish digital radio network

Czwórka
- Poland
- Branding: Czwórka (Four)

Programming
- Language: Polish

Ownership
- Owner: Polskie Radio
- Sister stations: Jedynka; Dwójka; Trójka

History
- First air date: 1976

Links
- Webcast: Live Stream
- Website: www.czworka.polskieradio.pl

Polskie Radio Program IV, known also as PR4 or radiowa Czwórka is a radio channel broadcast by the Polish public broadcaster, Polskie Radio.

The Program was started on 2 January 1976 as Polskie Radio Program IV. On 8 October 1994, the station was renamed to Radio Bis. At the beginning, it was a channel for young people, dedicated to sport and science. On 26 May 2008, the station changed its name into Radio Euro, and focused on musical entertainment and sport. On 2 August 2010, the station returned to its original name – Polskie Radio Program IV.

== Radio na Wizji ==
Radio na Wizji
- Country: Poland

Programming
- Language: Polish
- Picture format: 16:9

Ownership
- Owner: Polskie Radio

History
- Launched: 18 January 2011 (officially)
- Closed: 30 May 2012 (via satellite); 31 August 2014 (via cable); Live studio-cam is still available in Internet

On 18 January 2011, at 11:00 p.m., Polskie Radio Program IV officially started the project Radio na Wizji. It is a television channel, broadcasting as live video feed of the PR4. It's similar project to Italian RTL 102,5 Very Normal People, but the product of Polskie Radio is more advanced. However, due to very low watching figures the broadcast was announced to close at October 2011 (on satellite), while all cable serviced slowly follows. The feed finally ceased cable broadcasting on 31 August 2014, but studio-cam has been made available to watch at the station's internet website.

== Broadcasting ==
Since 1 September 2016, the channel is available only digital – via DAB+ network or Internet. Earlier Czwórka was available on FM, but Polish Radio management decided to cease this form of broadcasting in favor of Polskie Radio 24, which is now using the stations old frequencies.
