= List of radio stations in Kosovo =

The following is a list of radio stations in Republic of Kosovo.

== Coverage in Kosovo ==
Name	Frequency	App	online
Radio Dukagjini	99.7, 94.5, 104.7, 105.1, 92.7, 105.0 MHZ	yes	https://radiodukagjini.com/sq

== Regional coverage ==
Name	Frequency	Location	online	App		
Radio 1	98.0 FM	Pejë	https://tunein.com/radio/Radio-1-980-s324756/	Yes	https://play.google.com/store/apps/details?id=tenton.radioone	https://apps.apple.com/us/app/radio-one-radio-nj%C3%AB/id1476402648
Glam Radio	88.6 FM	Prishtinë				
Radio Prishtina	89.8 FM	Prishtinë				
Capital FM	92.1 FM	Prishtinë				
Paper Radio	91.1 FM	Prishtinë				
Radio HELIX	104.4 FM	Prizren				
Radio TEMA	94.9 FM	Ferizaj				

== Local coverage ==
Place (Alb.)	Place (Serb.)	Name	Frequency (MHz)
Babimoc	Babin Most	Radio M BM	104,0
Brezovicë	Brezovica	Radio Borzani	106,6
Brezovicë	Brezovica	Radio Spektar	94,3
Çagllavicë	Čaglavica	Radio Antenna	89,0
Çagllavicë	Čaglavica	Radio KIM	93,9
Deçan	Dečani	Top Iliria Radio	90,8
Bërnicë e Poshtme	Donja Brnjica	Radio AS DB	104,5
Sharr	Dragaš	Radio SHARRI	96,4
Dragash	Dragaš	Radio Gora Dragaš	106,3
Ferizaj	Uroševac	Radio Ferizaj	92,6
Ferizaj	Uroševac	Radio Festina	102,0
Ferizaj	Uroševac	Radio Furtuna	101,2
Fushë Kosovë	Kosovo Polje	Radio K	106,0
Gllogovc	Glogovac	Radio Dodona	88,2
Fushë Kosovë	Kosovo Polje	92.1 Capital FM	92,1
Gorazhdevc	Goraždevac	Radio Goraždevac	102,5
Graçanicë	Gračanica	Radio Gračanica	90,7
Gjakova	Đakovica	Radio Amadeus	97,5
Gjakova	Đakovica	Radio Gjakova	100,0
Gjakova	Đakovica	Radio Pandora	102,1
Gjakova	Đakovica	Top Radio	103,3
Gjilan	Gnjilane	Radio Energji	103,3
Gjilan	Gnjilane	Radio Mega Vox	100,9
Gjilan	Gnjilane	Radio Rinia	98,4
Gjilan	Gnjilane	Radio Star	96,4
Gjilan	Gnjilane	Radio Victoria	97,9
Istog	Istok	Radio Fontana	98,8
Kaçanik	Kačanik	Radio Kaçaniku	95,4
Kamenica	Kosovska Kamenica	Radio 24	94,0
Kamenica	Kosovska Kamenica	Radio Index	96,8
Kamenica	Kosovska Kamenica	Radio Kamenica	98,8
Kamenica	Kosovska Kamenica	Radio Premiera	101,1
Kastrioti	Obilić	Radio Maria Kosovë	107,4
Klinë	Klina	Radio Alba	91,2
Kllokot	Klokot	Radio Klokot	101,6
Leposaviq	Leposavić	Radio Bubamara	103,0
Leposaviq	Leposavić	Radio Impuls	100,3
Leposaviq	Leposavić	Radio Mir	92,9
Leshak	Lešak	Radio Lešak	100,9
Lubinjë e Epërme	Gornje Ljubinje	Radio Astra	89,4
Malisheva	Mališevo	Radio Malisheva	90,5
Mitrovicë	Kosovska Mitrovica	Radio Globi	104,6
Mitrovicë	Kosovska Mitrovica	Radio Kiss	92,2
Mitrovicë	Kosovska Mitrovica	Radio Kontakt Plus	101,9
Mitrovicë	Kosovska Mitrovica	Radio Mitrovica	99,0
Mitrovicë	Kosovska Mitrovica	Radio Ylberi	94,9
Novobërdë	Novo Brdo	Radio Youth Voice	91,9
Pasjan	Pasjane	Radio Hit Laser	104,8
Pasjan	Pasjane	Radio Kompas	100,4
Pejë	Peć	Radio Peja	93,0
Plemetin	Plemetina	Radio Elit	91,6
Podujevë	Podujevo	Radio Llapi	103,2
Podujevë	Podujevo	Radio Vizioni	88,1
Pozharan	Pozorane	Radio Zëri i Pozheranit	105,9
Preoqe	Preoce	Radio Vitez	104,9
Prilluzhë	Prilužje	Radio Bum	
Prishtinë	Priština	Glam Radio	88,6
Radio Kent FM	95,2		
Prishtinë	Priština	Radio Kosova e lirë	94,2
Prishtinë	Priština	Radio Plus	102,2
Prishtinë	Priština	Radio Urban FM	103,5
Prishtinë	Priština	Radio Vala Rinore	94,7
Prishtinë	Priština	Top Kosova Radio	91,1
Prizren	Prizren	Radio Balkan	95,1
Prizren	Prizren	Radio Besa	102,3
Prizren	Prizren	Radio Dardania	97,1
Prizren	Prizren	Radio Helix	104,4
Prizren	Prizren	Radio Omega 3	91,7
Prizren	Prizren	Radio Prizreni	88,4
Prizren	Prizren	Radio Romano Avazo	107,3
Rahovec	Orahovac	Radio Start	102,6
Restelicë	Restelica	Radio Bambus	100,0
Skenderaj	Srbica	Radio Drenica	107,6
Suhareka	Suva Reka	Radio Maria Kosovë	105,2
Suhareka	Suva Reka	Radio Vala 2000	98,3
Suhogërlë	Suvo Grlo	Radio 3 srca	87,7
Shillovë	Šilovo	Radio Max	102,4
Shtërpcë	Štrpce	Radio Herc	98,9
Shtime	Štimlje	Radio Zëri i Shtimes	89,6
Viti	Vitina	Radio Iliria	104,1
Vitomiricë	Vitomirica	Radio Hayat	95,4
Vushtrri	Vučitrn	Radio Vicianum	105,7
Zubin Potok	Zubin Potok	Radio Kolašin	89,1
Zubin Potok	Zubin Potok	Radio M	102,5
Zveçani	Zvečan	Radio AS	101,4
Zveçani	Zvečan	Radio Kosovska Mitrovica	103,3

== Internet ==
Name
Radio Manastirica
Radio Besa
Radio Gora
Radio Ilahi Shqip
Radio Helix
