= Outline of Ghana =

Country in West Africa

Flag of Ghana

Coat of arms of Ghana

The location of Ghana in Africa and Earth

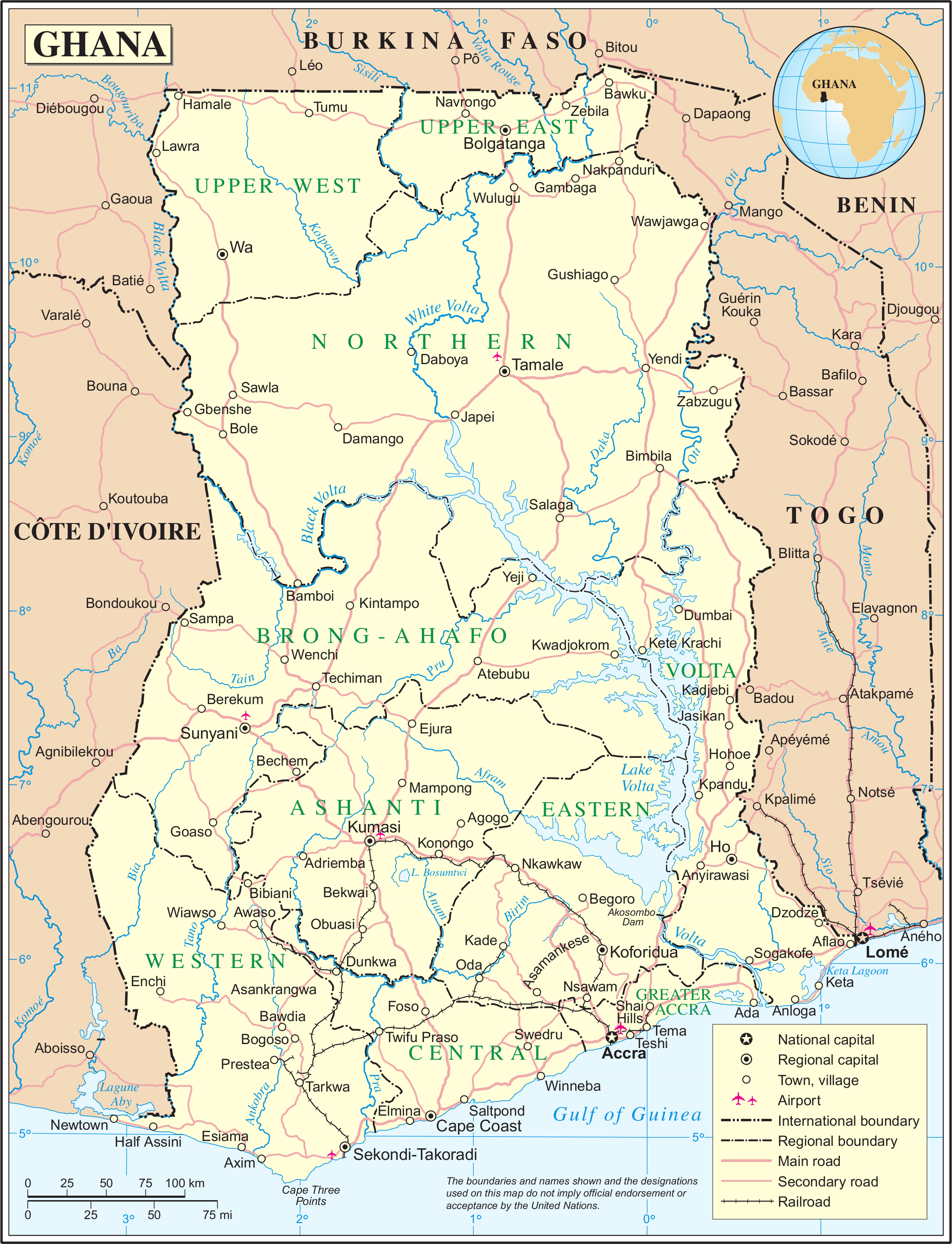
An enlargeable map of Ghana

The following outline is provided as an overview of and topical guide to Ghana:

Ghana – sovereign country in West Africa in Africa. The word "Ghana" means "Warrior King", and was the source of the name "Guinea" (via French Guinoye) used to refer to the West African coast (as in Gulf of Guinea). Ghana was inhabited in pre-colonial times by a number of ancient predominantly Akan kingdoms, foremost the Bono state, including the inland Empire of Ashanti and various Fante states along the coast and inland. Trade with European states flourished after contact with the Portuguese in the 15th century, and the British established a crown colony, Gold Coast, in 1874. Upon achieving independence from the United Kingdom in 1957, the name Ghana was chosen for the new nation to reflect the ancient Empire of Ghana that once extended throughout much of Western Africa. In the Akan language it is spelled Gaana.

== General reference ==
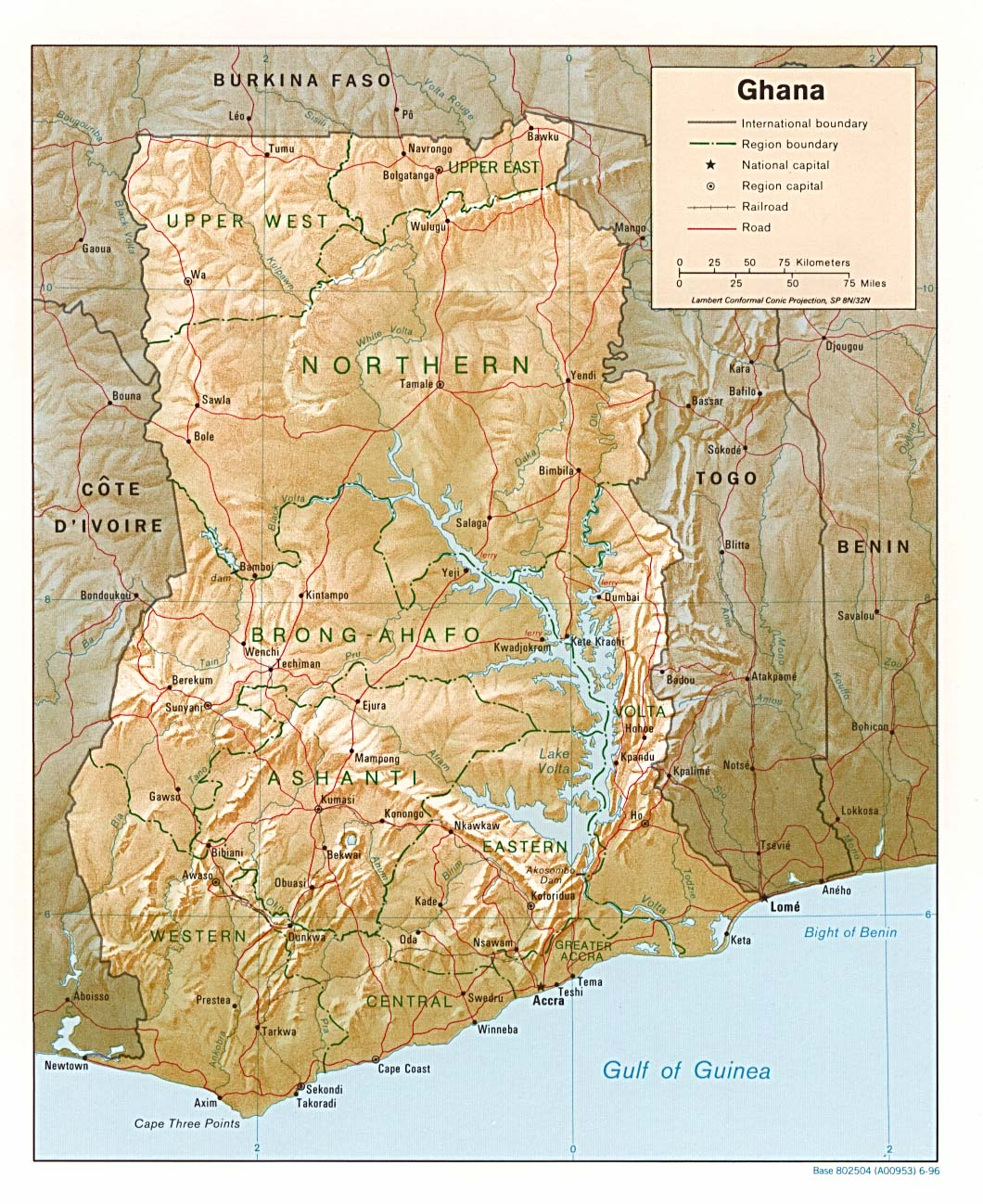
An enlargeable relief map of Ghana

- Pronunciation: /ˈɡɑːnə/
- Common English country name: Ghana
- Official English country name: The Republic of Ghana
- Common endonym(s):
- Official endonym(s):
- Adjectival(s): Ghanaian
- Demonym(s): Ghanaian(s)
- International rankings of Ghana
- ISO country codes: GH, GHA, 288
- ISO region codes: See ISO 3166-2:GH
- Internet country code top-level domain: .gh

== Geography of Ghana ==
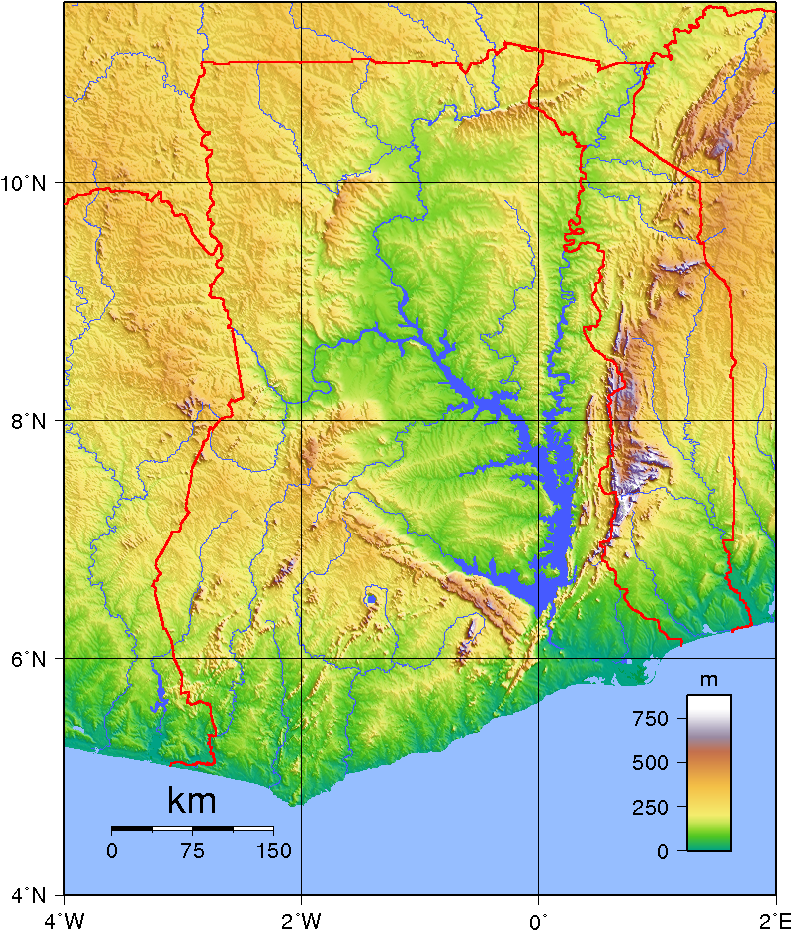
An enlargeable topographic map of Ghana

Geography of Ghana

- Ghana is: a country
- Regions : 16 Regions
- Population of Ghana: 28,830,000 - 47th most populous country
- Area of Ghana: 238,535 km^{2}
- Atlas of Ghana

=== Location ===
- Ghana is situated within the following regions:
  - Northern Hemisphere, on the Prime Meridian
    - Africa
      - West Africa
- Time zone: Coordinated Universal Time UTC+00
- Extreme points of Ghana
  - High: Mount Afadja 880 m (2,887 ft)
  - Low: Gulf of Guinea 0 m
- Land boundaries: 2,094 km

Togo 877 km
Cote d'Ivoire 668 km
Burkina Faso 549 km

- Coastline: 539 km

=== Environment of Ghana ===
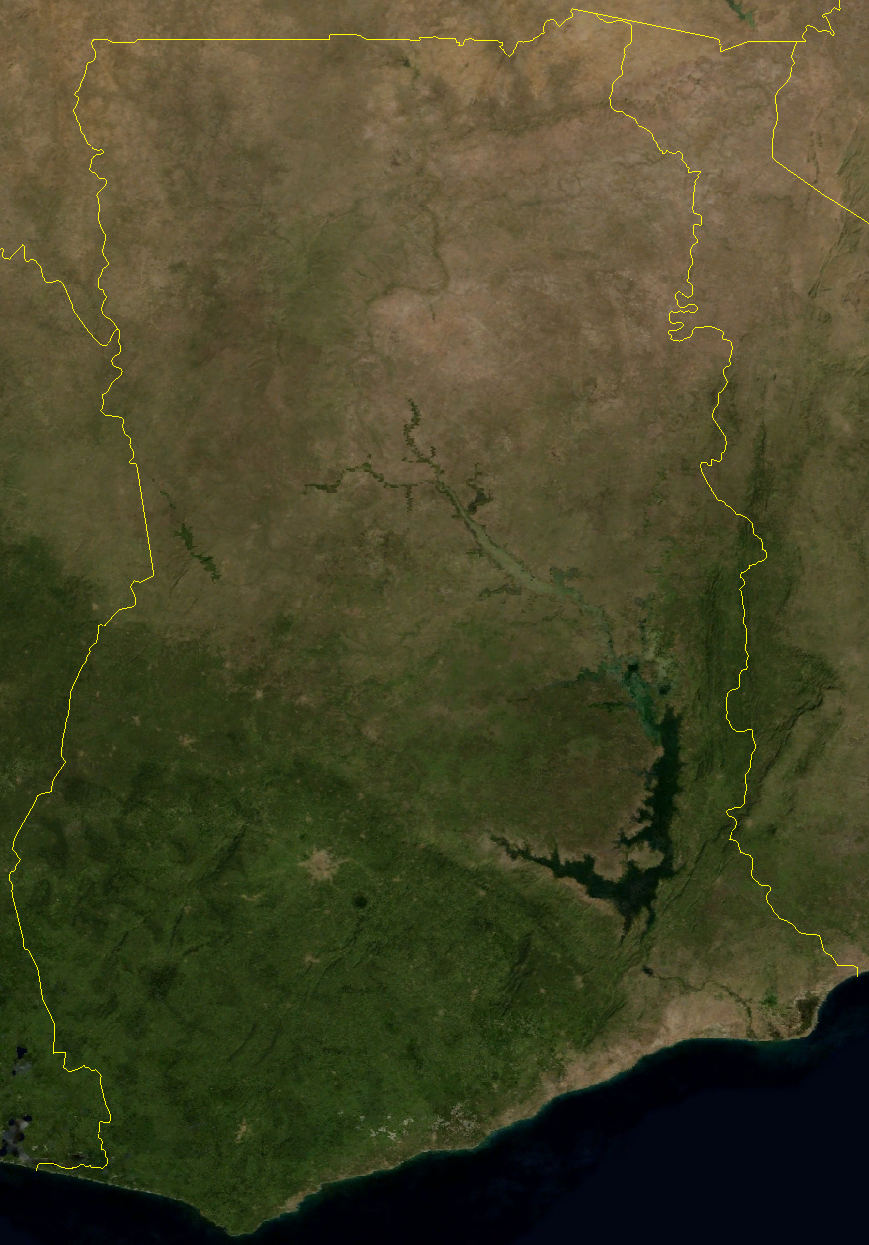
An enlargeable satellite image of Ghana

- Climate of Ghana
- Geology of Ghana
- Protected areas of Ghana
  - National parks of Ghana
- Wildlife of Ghana
  - Fauna of Ghana
    - Birds of Ghana
    - Mammals of Ghana

==== Natural geographic features of Ghana ====
- Glaciers in Ghana: none
- Rivers of Ghana
- World Heritage Sites in Ghana

=== 16 Regions of Ghana ===
- Regions of Ghana
  - Districts of Ghana

==== Administrative divisions of Ghana ====
Administrative divisions of Ghana

===== Districts of Ghana =====
Districts of Ghana

===== Municipalities of Ghana =====
- Capital of Ghana: Accra
- Cities of Ghana

=== Demography of Ghana ===
Demographics of Ghana

== Government and politics of Ghana ==
Politics of Ghana

- Form of government: presidential representative democratic republic
- Capital of Ghana: Accra
- Elections in Ghana
- Political parties in Ghana

=== Branches of the government of Ghana ===
Government of Ghana

==== Executive branch of the government of Ghana ====
- Head of state: President of Ghana, John Mahama
- Head of government: President of Ghana, John Mahama

==== Legislative branch of the government of Ghana ====
- Parliament of Ghana (unicameral)

==== Judicial branch of the government of Ghana ====
Judiciary of Ghana

- Supreme Court of Ghana

=== Foreign relations of Ghana ===
Foreign relations of Ghana

- Diplomatic missions in Ghana
- Diplomatic missions of Ghana

==== International organization membership ====
The Republic of Ghana is a member of:

- African, Caribbean, and Pacific Group of States (ACP)
- African Development Bank Group (AfDB)
- African Union (AU)
- African Union/United Nations Hybrid operation in Darfur (UNAMID)
- Commonwealth of Nations
- Economic Community of West African States (ECOWAS)
- Food and Agriculture Organization (FAO)
- Group of 24 (G24)
- Group of 77 (G77)
- International Atomic Energy Agency (IAEA)
- International Bank for Reconstruction and Development (IBRD)
- International Chamber of Commerce (ICC)
- International Civil Aviation Organization (ICAO)
- International Criminal Court (ICCt)
- International Criminal Police Organization (Interpol)
- International Development Association (IDA)
- International Federation of Red Cross and Red Crescent Societies (IFRCS)
- International Finance Corporation (IFC)
- International Fund for Agricultural Development (IFAD)
- International Labour Organization (ILO)
- International Maritime Organization (IMO)
- International Mobile Satellite Organization (IMSO)
- International Monetary Fund (IMF)
- International Olympic Committee (IOC)
- International Organization for Migration (IOM)
- International Organization for Standardization (ISO)
- International Red Cross and Red Crescent Movement (ICRM)
- International Telecommunication Union (ITU)
- International Telecommunications Satellite Organization (ITSO)
- International Trade Union Confederation (ITUC)
- Inter-Parliamentary Union (IPU)
- Multilateral Investment Guarantee Agency (MIGA)
- Nonaligned Movement (NAM)
- Organisation internationale de la Francophonie (OIF) (associate member)
- Organisation for the Prohibition of Chemical Weapons (OPCW)
- Organization of American States (OAS) (observer)
- United Nations (UN)
- United Nations Conference on Trade and Development (UNCTAD)
- United Nations Educational, Scientific, and Cultural Organization (UNESCO)
- United Nations High Commissioner for Refugees (UNHCR)
- United Nations Industrial Development Organization (UNIDO)
- United Nations Institute for Training and Research (UNITAR)
- United Nations Interim Force in Lebanon (UNIFIL)
- United Nations Mission for the Referendum in Western Sahara (MINURSO)
- United Nations Mission in Liberia (UNMIL)
- United Nations Mission in the Central African Republic and Chad (MINURCAT)
- United Nations Observer Mission in Georgia (UNOMIG)
- United Nations Operation in Cote d'Ivoire (UNOCI)
- United Nations Organization Mission in the Democratic Republic of the Congo (MONUC)
- Universal Postal Union (UPU)
- World Confederation of Labour (WCL)
- World Customs Organization (WCO)
- World Federation of Trade Unions (WFTU)
- World Health Organization (WHO)
- World Intellectual Property Organization (WIPO)
- World Meteorological Organization (WMO)
- World Tourism Organization (UNWTO)
- World Trade Organization (WTO)

=== Law and order in Ghana ===
- Constitution of Ghana
- Human rights in Ghana
  - Abortion in Ghana
  - LGBT rights in Ghana
- Law enforcement in Ghana

=== Military of Ghana ===
Military of Ghana

- Command
  - Commander-in-chief:
    - Ministry of Defence of Ghana
- Forces
  - Army of Ghana
  - Navy of Ghana
  - Air Force of Ghana

== History of Ghana ==
=== Period-coverage ===
- Early history
- Colonial era
- Dominion
- 1966 to 1979

=== By field ===
- Economic history of Ghana
- History of the Jews in Ghana
- Political history of Ghana
- Postage stamps and postal history of Ghana

=== By populated place ===
- Elmina
- Kumasi

== Culture of Ghana ==
Culture of Ghana

- Architecture of Ghana
- Cuisine of Ghana
- Festivals in Ghana
- Ghanaian literature
- Languages of Ghana
- Media in Ghana
- Social conduct in Ghana
- National symbols of Ghana
  - Coat of arms of Ghana
  - Flag of Ghana
  - National anthem of Ghana
- Prostitution in Ghana
- Public holidays in Ghana
- Religion in Ghana
  - Christianity in Ghana
  - Hinduism in Ghana
  - Islam in Ghana
    - Ahmadiyya in Ghana
- World Heritage Sites in Ghana

=== Art in Ghana ===
- Akan art
- Cinema of Ghana
  - Kumawood
- Kente cloth
- Music of Ghana
  - Afrobeats
  - Gh hiphop
  - Hiplife
  - Highlife
  - Raglife
- Video gaming in Ghana

=== Sports in Ghana ===
Sports in Ghana

- Football in Ghana
- Ghana at the Olympics
- Rugby union in Ghana

== Economy and infrastructure of Ghana ==
Economy of Ghana

- Economic rank, by nominal GDP (2025): 79th (seventy-ninth)
- Agriculture in Ghana (Fishing in Ghana, Forestry in Ghana)
- Communications in Ghana
  - Internet in Ghana
    - Ghana Internet Policy
    - New media in Ghana
- Companies of Ghana
- Currency of Ghana: Cedi
  - ISO 4217: GHS
- Electricity sector in Ghana
- Healthcare in Ghana
- Petroleum industry in Ghana
- Mining in Ghana
- Manufacturing in Ghana
- Ghana Stock Exchange
- Salt industry in Ghana
- Trade unions in Ghana
- Transport in Ghana
  - Airports in Ghana
  - Rail transport in Ghana
  - Road Network
- Water supply and sanitation in Ghana

== Education in Ghana ==
Education in Ghana

== Health in Ghana ==
Health in Ghana

- Eye care in Ghana
  - Optometry in Ghana

== See also ==
Ghana

- List of Ghana-related topics
- List of international rankings
- Member state of the Commonwealth of Nations
- Member state of the United Nations
- Outline of Africa
- Outline of geography
