= List of radio stations in Eastern Region =

Below is a list of radio stations in the Eastern region of Ghana.

	Frequency	Location
Eastern FM	105.1	Koforidua
Bryt FM	99.1	Koforidua
Poly FM	87.7	Koforidua
Fawe FM	105.9	Nsawam
Life FM	98.7	Nkawkaw
KTP FM	105.7	Asakraka
LTB FM	107.1	Asakraka
Lil Pages FM	102.9	Asakraka
Spring FM		
Obouba FM	91.7	Nkawkaw
Vision FM	90.9	
Emak FM	97.7	Koforidua
Krush FM		
Goodlife FM	105.5	Koforidua
Unity FM	87.7	Kwahu Atibie
GBC Sunrise FM	106.7 / 102.1	Koforidua
Agoo FM	96.9	Nkawkaw
Okoman Radio	97.1	Akropong
Delight Fm	99.3	Nkawkaw
Republic FM	97.5	Nkawkaw
Okwawu FM	96.3	Nkawkaw
Kingdom FM	105.7	Nkawkaw

== See also ==
- Media of Ghana
- List of newspapers in Ghana
- List of radio stations in Ghana
- Telecommunications in Ghana
- New Media in Ghana
