= List of radio stations in Northern Region =

Below is a list of radio stations in the Northern region of Ghana.

== List of radio stations ==
Bishara Radio	97.7Mhz	Tamale
Grin FM	94.7Mhz	Nyankpala
Angel FM	96.9Mhz	Tamale
123 FM	99.7Mhz	Tamale
Zaa Radio	99.3Mhz	Tamale
Savannah Radio	91.3Mhz	Tamale
Diamond FM	93.7Mhz	Tamale
Radio Justice FM	98.5Mhz	Tamale
Fiila FM	89.3Mhz	Tamale
NorthStar Radio	92.1Mhz	Tamale
Might FM	90.5Mhz	Savelugu
Eagle FM	94.1Mhz	Walewale
Kesmi FM	107.1Mhz	Tamale
Gmantambu Radio	96.1Mhz	Bimbilla
Radio Tamale	91.7Mhz	Tamale
Ridge FM	104.9Mhz	Tamale
Suhupielli	103.3Mhz	Tamale
Majority Radio	98.3 MHz	Tamale
Jata Radio	98.7Mhz	Karaga
Radio Gaakii	88.3Mhz	Saboba
Simli Radio	95.3Mhz	Dalun
Tolon Radio	102.7Mhz	Tolon
Dagbon FM	102.5Mhz	Tamale
Gbangu FM	97.3Mhz	Tamale
N'Saha Radio	96.3Mhz	Tamale
NorthCiti Radio		Tamale

== See also ==
- Media of Ghana
- List of newspapers in Ghana
- List of radio stations in Ghana
- Telecommunications in Ghana
- New Media in Ghana
