= List of radio stations in Ashanti Region =

Below is a list of radio stations in the Ashanti region of Ghana.

== List of radio stations ==
Name	Frequency (MHz)	City or Town
Angel FM	96.1	Kumasi
Y FM	102.5	Kumasi
Ashh FM	101.1	Kumasi
Boss FM	93.7	Kumasi
Sikka FM	89.5	Kumasi
Focus FM	94.3	Kumasi
Fox FM	97.9	Kumasi
Akoma FM	87.9	Kumasi-Asokwa
Silver FM	98.3	Kumasi
Garden City Radio	92.1	Kumasi
Hello FM	101.5	Kumasi
Dess FM	90.3	Bekwai
Metro FM	94.1	Kumasi
Kapital Radio	97.1	Kumasi
RFI	92.9	Kumasi
Kessben FM	93.3	Kumasi
Solid FM	103.7	Kumasi
Kings Radio	100.3	Konongo
Light FM	94.9	Kumasi
Luv FM	99.5	Kumasi
Ezra FM	94.1	Ejisu
New Mercury	91.5	Kumasi
Nhyira FM	104.5	Kumasi
Bohye FM	95.3	Kumasi
Otec FM	102.9	Kumasi
Radio Lynk	90.5	Kumasi Technical University
Spirit FM	88.3	Kumasi
Ultimate FM	106.9	Kumasi
Zuria FM	88.7	Kumasi
Price FM	107.3	Kumasi
Gye Nyame FM	94.5	Kumasi
Sunsum FM	98.7	Kumasi
Cash FM	91.1	Kumasi
Tyme FM	96.9	Obuasi
Shaft FM	98.1	Obuasi
Mynd FM	105.1	AAM-USTED, Kumasi
Alpha Radio	104.9	Kumasi
Okese FM	106.5	Ejisu
Cruz FM	96.9	Akomadan
Sea FM	102.1	Kumasi
Okese FM	106.5	Ejisu
O FM	107.7	Obuasi
Asempa Radio	103.1	Agogo
Virgin City Radio	105.3	Konongo
Kings Radio	100.3	Konongo
Abusua fm	96.5	Kumasi
Pure FM	95.7	Kumasi
Adehye	99.1	Kumasi
Adwenpa	99.9	Nkawie
Oyerepa Fm	100.7	Kumasi
Orange Fm (Ghana)	107.9	Kumasi
Edubiaseman FM	97.5	New Edubiase
Holy FM	105.7	Kumasi
Aben FM	103.3	Kumasi
Time FM	105.3	Akomadan
Kumasi Fm	104.1	Kumasi
Sompa Fm	93.1	Kumasi
Anidaso FM	87.5	Kumasi
Agyenkwa FM	101.9	Kumasi
Ahoto FM	92.5	Kumasi
Sikapa	100.5	Obuasi
Naagyei FM	90.3	Ejura
Today's Radio	101.7	Ejura
Haske FM	91.7	Kumasi
Life FM	94.7	Offinso
Salt FM	95.9	Agogo
Kingdom FM	100.1	Kumasi
Wontumi Radio	101.3	Kumasi
Opemsuo FM	104.7	Kumasi
Glory FM	89.7	New Edubiase
Nice FM	94.3	Tepa
Adanse3 FM	98.9	Asante Akim Agogo
Ahwenepa FM	95.5	Juaso
Aseda FM	92.3	Obuasi
AMC Radio	89.7	Asokore Mampong
Fish FM	88.5	Boaman, Afigya Kwabre
Duapa FM	93.5	Konongo
Promise FM	105.9	Kumasi
Asaase Radio	98.5	Kumasi
Heaven FM	90.1	Kumasi
Rock FM	97.3	Kumasi
Nkomo FM	91.7	Anwia Nkwanta

Nkosuo fm 95.3

== See also ==
- Media of Ghana
- List of newspapers in Ghana
- List of radio stations in Ghana
- Telecommunications in Ghana
- New Media in Ghana
