= List of radio stations in Brong-Ahafo Region =

Below is a list of radio stations in Brong-Ahafo Region, Ghana.

== List of radio stations ==
Name	Frequency (MHz)	City or Town
RejoiceFm	101.7	Mim
Asta FM	103.9	TECHIMAN
Dero FM	99.9	Nkoranza
RADIO LINK	89.1	TECHIMAN
Anapua FM	105.1	Kenyasi
Star FM	89.7	Atebubu
Ark FM	107.1	Sunyani
Dormaa FM	100.7	Dormaa
Space FM	87.7	Sunyani
Akwaaba Radio	98.1	Berekum
Chris FM	88.9	Berekum
Adepa FM	107.3	Techiman
Dinpa FM	91.3	Sunyani
Nkomode FM	102.7	Kintampo
Omega Radio	94.9	Drobo
Sky FM	96.7	Sunyani
Kiss FM	97.5	Drobo
Gifts FM	105.5	Dormaa
Akyaa FM	99.1	Nkoranza
Nananom FM	92.5	Goaso
Success FM	90.9	Goaso
Genesis FM	88.5	Goaso
Adunu FM	89.7	Sankore
Yankee FM	95.9	Sampa
Shalom FM	100.3	Berekum
Royals FM	104.7	Wenchi
Classic FM	91.9	Techiman
Asta FM	103.9	Techiman
Metro FM	90.5	Sunyani
Storm FM	101.9	Sunyani
Tain FM	90.9	Nsawkaw
JLife FM	95.5	Odumase-Sunyani
Radio BAR (GBC)	93.5	Sunyani
Moonlite FM	102.3	Sunyani
Suncity FM	97.1	Sunyani
Agyenkwa FM	105.9	Techiman
Gaskiya FM	105.5	Techiman
Ahenfo FM	98.1	Berekum
Anidaso) FM	101.5	Japekrom-Drobo
Winners FM	98.5	Techiman
Rock FM	106.7	Techiman
Gye Nyame FM	107.7	Sampa
Free Fm	97.5	Techiman
Abapa FM	90.1	Sunyani
K FM	103.5	Techiman
Akomapa FM	89.3	Berekum
Voice FM	94.3	Dormaa Ahenkro
Greena FM	95.9	UENR, Sunyani
Adwumapa FM	98.9	Sunyani
After 2 Radio	91.7	Bechem
Sunyani FM	88.1	Sunyani
Cash FM	93.9	Sunyani
Akina Radio	100.9	Techiman
High FM	103.1	Bechem
Angel FM	92.3	Sunyani
West Africa Radio	92.5	Wenchi
Akonoba FM	92.7	Sunyani
Nsoroma FM	92.1	Nkrankwanta
Heaven FM	97.7	Sunyani
Parrot FM	99.7	STU, Sunyani
Cheers FM	100.5	Sunyani
Master FM	104.3	Berekum
Fabea FM	94.7	Nkoranza
Golden City Radio	104.9	Berekum
Zone FM	101.3	Kintampo
Adikanfo FM	99.1	Jinijini
Jaman Radio	103.7	Drobo
Nimdie FM	95.1	Sunyani
Kingdom FM	99.3	Sunyani
Osikani FM	99.7	Nkrankwanta
Ewiase FM	95.7	Wenchi
Adars FM	107.7	Kintampo
GBC Kintampo Radio	96.3	Kintampo
Charity FM	99.9	Duayaw Nkwanta
Jewel FM	102.7	Duayaw Nkwanta
== See also == : Media of Ghana; List of newspapers in Ghana; List of radio stations in Ghana; Telecommunications in Ghana; New Media in Ghana		
