= List of radio stations in Western Region =

Below is a list of radio stations in the Western Region and Western North Region of Ghana.

== List of radio stations ==
Name	Frequency (MHz)	City or Town
Best FM	90.5	Bogoso
Fox FM		Takoradi
Angel FM	92.3	Takoradi
Sharp FM	106.9	Takoradi
Vision FM	102.7	Debiso, WNR
Winners FM	104.9	Essam, WNR
Sekondi FM		Sekondi
Skyy Power	93.5	
BBC	104.7	Takoradi
Radio Maxx	105.1	Takoradi
De Beat FM	95.5	Asawinso, WNR
Liberty FM	92.7	Wiawso, WNR
Rainbow FM	107.7	Juaboso, WNR
Rivers FM	90.1	Wassa Akropong
Paragon FM	99.9	Takoradi
Adehyee FM	100.3	Bibiani, WNR
Aseda FM	105.9	Takoradi
Help FM	103.9	Takoradi
Goodnews FM	96.3	Takoradi
Beach FM	105.5	Takoradi
Radio 360	90.1	Takoradi
Rok FM	98.7	Takoradi
Melody FM	91.1	Takoradi
YFM	97.9	Takoradi
Dynamite	88.9	Tarkwa
Space FM	87.7	Tarkwa
Stylish FM	102.1	Bibiani WNR
Faith FM	98.7	Dwinase, WNR
Uniik FM		Bosomoiso, WNR
Ahobrase3 FM		Asankraguwa, WNR
West End Radio	100.3	Esiama
Ankobra Fm	101.9	Axim
New Day Fm	94.7	Azuleti
Radio Shama	92.9	Shama
Medeama FM		Tarkwa
Pure FM		Tarkwa
Big Fm	96.7	Takoradi
Trinity Fm	96.7	Bogoso
Fact Fm	104.3	Bogoso
Energy Fm	93.3	Prestea
Asomdwee FM	102.1	Prestea
Best Fm	90.5	Bogoso
Radio Premier	100.5	Takoradi
New Day fm	94.1	
Hope fm	107.1	
Border radio	87.9	
Nyamekye Radio		Dadieso Suaman, WNR
Trikie fm	99.5	Enchi, WNR
Max fm	102.7	Enchi, WNR
GBC fm		Enchi, WNR
Brosaman fm		Enchi, WNR
Radio Silver	92.3	Sekondi
Okyeame Radio		Bibiani, WNR
Westgold Radio	103.6	Takoradi
Second Chance FM	94.3	Takoradi
Ogyeaman FM	107.7	Prestea, WR

== See also ==
- Mass media in Ghana
- List of newspapers in Ghana
- List of radio stations in Ghana
- Telecommunications in Ghana
- New media in Ghana
