= GAMBO =

Ghanaian musician

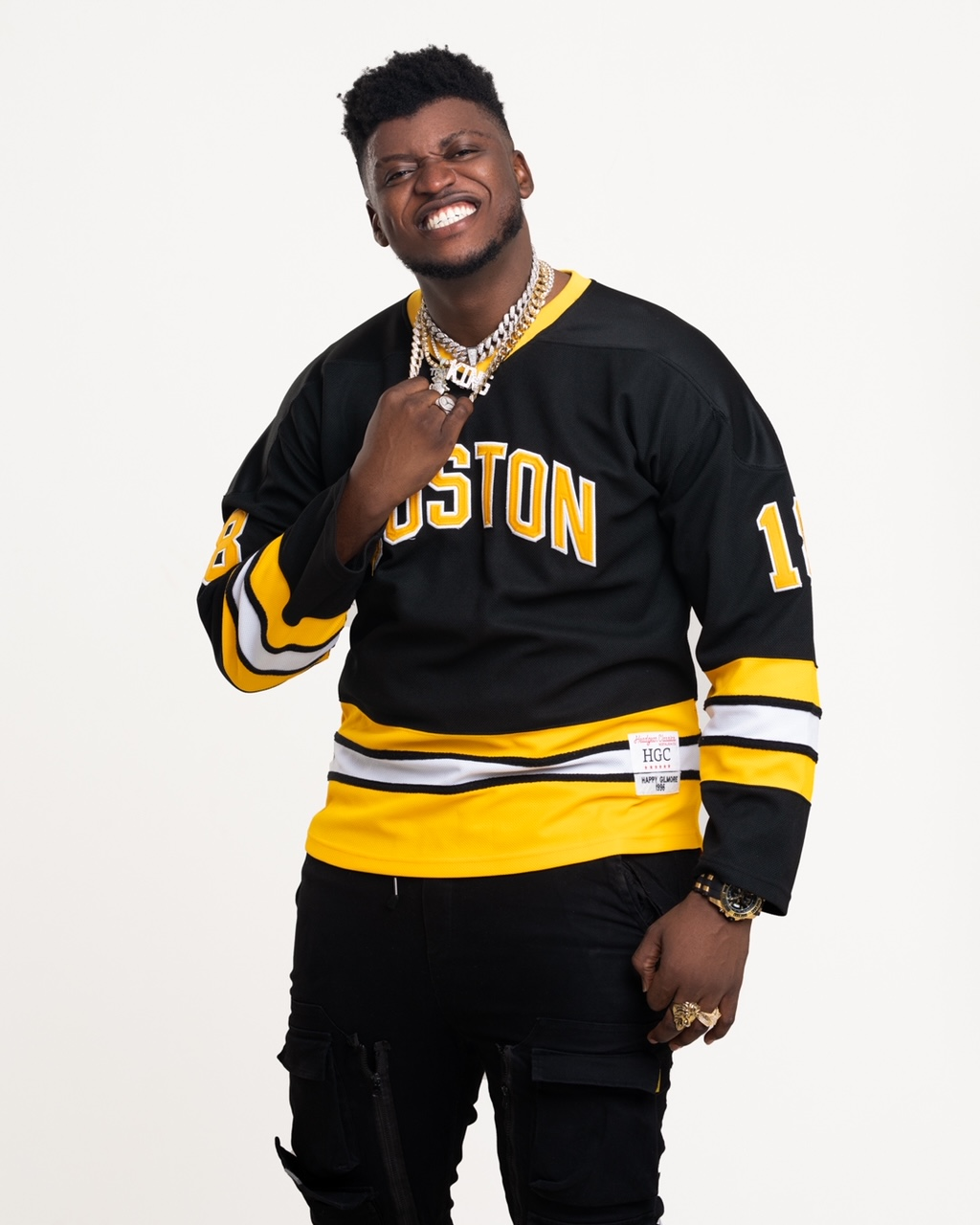

Background information
- Born: Annan Bashir; April 8, 1995 (age 30); Accra, Ghana
- Origin: Accra
- Occupation: Rapper

Bashir Annan (born April 8, 1995) better known by his stage name Gambo, is a Ghanaian rapper, songwriter and singer. He is a winner of Ghana Teens Choice Awards and is featured on different notable newspapers and magazines including The Ghanaian Times, ModernGhana, Daily Graphic, News Ghana, Yen, TooXclusive, Joy FM, GhanaWeb and more.

== Life ==
Gambo was born on April 8, 1995, in Accra, Ghana. He completed his education at Legon Presbyterian Boys from where he also started his music career. He completed his graduation from University of Ghana where he studied public administration for 2 years. In 2015, He won the Ultimate Ghana Teen Choice Awards the same year. He is also ranked in the top 5 upcoming African acts in the Spark Magazine.

== Discography ==
- Kwacha
- Missed call
- Drip
