= List of radio stations in Volta Region =

This table shows a list of radio stations in the Volta region of Ghana, along with their various frequencies.

Name	Frequency (MHz)	Town or City
Jubilee Radio	106.9	Keta
Klenam FM	101.5	Aveyime Battor
ABAAC FM	105.7	Aflao
Light FM	101.1	Denu
Holy FM	98.5	Aflao
Victory FM	96.1	Awakome - Aflao
Lorlornyo FM	93.3	Hohoe
Volta Premier FM	98.1	Ho
Hope	93.1	Ho
Kekeli Radio	102.9	Ho
Volta Star Radio	91.3	Ho
Kaleawo FM	107.3	Akatsi
Shine FM	96.9	Akatsi
Hogebe FM	106.5	Anloga
Kuul FM	103.5	Ho
Radio Tongu	92.1	Sogakope
Tosh FM	103.9	Ho
Nyatefe Radio	94.5	Dzodze
Denyigba Radio	90.9	Dzodze
Dzigbordi FM	94.9	Dzodze
Revival FM	99.3	Tadzewu
Agboo FM	92.9	Penyi
Lukusi Radio	96.1	Golokwati

== See also ==
- Media of Ghana
- List of newspapers in Ghana
- List of radio stations in Ghana
- Telecommunications in Ghana
- New Media in Ghana
