= List of radio stations in Upper West Region =

Below is a list of Top radio stations in the Upper West Region of Ghana.

Name	Frequency (MHz)	City or Town
Info Radio 91.1FM	91.1 MHz	Wa
Radio Upper West	90.1 MHz	Wa
Home Radio	99.7MHz	Wa
Radio Progress	98.1MHz	Wa
Radford FM	107.5 MHz	Tumu
Nandom FM	101.9 MHz	Nandom

Here are some additions Radio Stations based in Wa, the regional capital of the Upper West Region.:

- Info Radio 91.1 FM
- Radio Mak in Wa
- Radio Waa in Wa
- Sungmaale FM in Wa
- WFM in Wa
- Bugli FM in Wa
- Home radio in Wa
- Radio Progress
- Hope Radio
- Melodie Radio
- Limaniya Radio
- Puopelle Radio
- Radio Upper West
- Tungsong Radio
- Kangyiri Radio
- Sungviela FM

== Radio Station based in Nadowli ==
- Tumpani FM

== Radio Stations based in Jirapa ==
- Jirapa FM
- Gangaa FM

== Radio Station based in Lawra ==
- Tideltaa Radio
- West Link Radio

== Radio Station based in Nandom ==
- Nandom FM
- VON FM

== Radio Station based in GwollU- Sisaala West ==
- Gwollu FM

== Radio Station based in Tumu - Sisaala East ==
- Radford
- Sisaala Radio
- Nibaala Radio

== Radio Station based in Funsi - Wa East ==
- Pullung Radio

== See also ==
- Media of Ghana
- List of newspapers in Ghana
- List of radio stations in Ghana
- Telecommunications in Ghana
- New Media in Ghana
