= Business and Financial Times =

Ghanaian business newspaper

The Business and Financial Times (B&FT) is a Ghanaian privately owned newspaper which focuses on reporting business news from Ghana and across the African continent. The newspaper is popularly known as the B&FT, it has a nationwide coverage and a readership of about 309,000 as reported by Geopoll's ranking of nationwide top newspapers. Its mainly noted for its coverage on issues about the banking sector, local and international trade, the oil and gas sector and that of the macro and micro economy.

== See also ==
- List of newspapers in Ghana
- Media of Ghana
- List of radio stations in Ghana
- Telecommunications in Ghana
- New Media in Ghana
