= List of radio stations in Upper East Region =

Below is a list of radio stations in the Upper East region of Ghana.

Name	Frequency (MHz)	City or Town
A1 Radio	101.1	Bolgatanga
Bawku FM	101.5	Bawku
Source FM	100.1	Bawku
Sunshine FM	96.5	Bawku
Word FM	88.3	Zuarungu
GBC URA Radio	89.7	Bolgatanga
Nabiina Radio	90.7	Navrongo
Radio Bliss	94.7	Bawku
Radio Gurune	99.3	Bolgatanga
Rock FM	103.7	Bolgatanga
Radio Builsa	106.5	Sandema
Radio Fumbisi	99.7	Fumbisi

== See also ==
- Media of Ghana
- List of newspapers in Ghana
- List of radio stations in Ghana
- Telecommunications in Ghana
- New Media in Ghana
