= List of radio stations in Central Region =

Below is a list of radio stations in the Central Region of Ghana.

== List of radio stations ==
Name	Frequency (MHz)	City or Town
Pink Fm	96.9	Kasoa
Impact 97.9	97.9	Ajumako
Eagle FM	87.7	Cape Coast
Kastle FM	90.3	Cape Coast
Darling FM	90.9	Cape Coast
Radio Central	92.5 and 91.3	Cape Coast
Cape FM	93.3	Cape Coast
Heaven FM	96.9	Cape Coast
ATL FM	100.5	Cape Coast - UCC
Yes FM	102.9	Cape Coast
Sweet Memories FM	104.5	Cape Coast
Obrapa FM	106.9	Cape Coast
Live FM	107.5	Cape Coast
Bankam FM	95.1	Jukwa
Oguaa FM		
Apam FM		
Swedru FM		
Nananom FM		
Nkwa FM		
Kurotsir Amanfo FM		Mankessim
Obrempong FM	91.7	Swedru
Radio Biak		
Hope FM		Breman Asikuma
Mozano Akofo FM		Mozano
Spark FM	103.5	Dunkwa
Solar FM	91.1	Dunkwa
Asafo FM	99.1	Elmina
Pax FM	96.5.5	Elmina
Benya FM	105.7	Elmina
Ahomka FM	99.5	Elmina
Obaako Fm		Mankessim
Thera FM		Kasoa
Breezy FM	105.3	Ajumako Bisease
Kantinka FM		Agona Swedru
Oburmankoma FM		Mankessim
Sweetfm	106.5	Twifo Praso
Arisefm	87.7	Twifo Praso
Twifoman FM	106.7	Twifo Kampong
Cancokefm	100.6	Twifo Praso.

== See also ==
- Media of Ghana
- List of newspapers in Ghana
- Telecommunications in Ghana
- New media in Ghana
