= List of libraries in Ghana =

The following is a list of libraries in Ghana.

== Libraries ==
Library	Location	Year Established	Website	Type
Street Library Ghana	Accra	2011		Public - Youth & Children
Accra Central Library	Accra	1956 (approximate date)		Public
Accra Technical University Library	Accra	1949	http://atu.edu.gh/library/	Academic
Accra Technical Training Centre Library	Accra	1966		Academic
Achimota School Library	Accra	1927		Academic
Akenten Appiah-Menka University of Skills Training and Entrepreneurial Development	Kumasi	1966	https://aamusted.edu.gh/library/	Academic
Ashanti Regional Library	Kumasi	1954		Public
Balme Library, University of Ghana	Legon	1959		Academic
Bolgatanga regional library	Bolgatanga			Public
Bolgatanga Technical University Library	Bolgatanga	1999	https://www.bolgatu.edu.gh/	Academic
University of Media, Arts and Communication (UniMAC-GIJ)	Accra	1959	https://gij.edu.gh/library/	Academic
Ghana Institute of Management and Public Administration Library	Accra	1961	www.gimpa.edu.gh/academics/libraries/	Academic
Ghana School of Law Library	Accra	1958		Professional
Greater Accra Regional Library	Accra	1949	www.library.gov.gh#/web-home/web-home	Public
Ho regional library	<Ho>			
Kehillah Center and Public Library	Accra	2022	https://www.google.com/maps/place/Kehillah+Center+and+Public+Library/@5.6254896,-0.2967437,17z/data=!4m5!3m4!1s0xfdf9b8bc51d0ded:0x29bae9af80da60aa!8m2!3d5.6254896!4d-0.294555	Public
Koforidua regional library	Koforidua			
Kpandu Technical Institute Library	Kpandu	1972		Academic
Kwame Nkrumah University of Science and Technology Library	Kumasi	1952	https://library.knust.edu.gh/	Academic
Library Of Africa and The African Diaspora (LOATAD)	Accra	2020	loatad.org	Special
Northern Regional Library	Tamale			
George Padmore Research Library	Accra			National
SD Dombo University of Business and Integrated Development Studies	Wa	2019	https://ubids.edu.gh/library	Academic
Sunyani Technical University Library	Sunyani	1997		Academic
Sunyani regional library				
Supreme Court Library		1909		
Takoradi Polytechnic Library	Takoradi	1958		Academic
Todd and Ruth Warren Library, Ashesi University	Berekuso	2002	https://ashesi.edu.gh/library/	Academic
Trinity College Library	Accra	1948		Academic
University for Development Studies Library	Tamale	1993	https://uds.edu.gh/library/	Academic
Sam Jonah Library, University of Cape Coast	Cape Coast	1962	https://library.ucc.edu.gh/	Academic
University of Education Library	Winneba	1992	https://www.uew.edu.gh/main/library	Academic
University of Media, Arts and Communication - GIJ Library	Accra	2020	https://library.gij.edu.gh/	Academic
Upper East Regional Library	[Bolgatanga]			
Upper West Regional Library	<Wa>			
Western Regional Library	Sekondi	1955		
Wechiau Community Library	Wechiau	2011	www.wechiau.org	General
Koforidua Technical University Library	Koforidua	1997	library.ktu.edu.gh	Academic
Tamale Technical University Library	Tamale	1963	tatu.edu.gh/library/	Academic
Cape Coast Technical University Library	Cape Coast	1986	https://cctu.edu.gh/site/page.php?id=69357	Academic
Ho Technical University Library	Ho	1968	https://library.htu.edu.gh/services/	Academic
Hilla Liman Technical University Library	Wa	1999	https://dhltu.edu.gh/	Academic
China Europe International Business School Library	Accra	2008	library.ceibs.edu/en	Academic
Zenith University College Library	Accra	2001	www.zucghana.org/site/contents/academics/13	Academic
Jayee University Library	Accra	1988	https://juc.edu.gh/page?id=8543299	Academic
Alhaji Asuma Banda Library	Kintampo	1969	www.cohk.edu.gh/wordpress/index.php/library-services/	Academic

== See also ==
- Copyright law of Ghana
- Ghana Library Authority
- Ghanaian literature
- Library associations in Ghana
- List of universities in Ghana
- Mass media in Ghana
