= List of radio stations in Ghana =

This is a list of lists of radio stations in Ghana, organized by region.

- List of radio stations in Western Region
- List of radio stations in Eastern Region
- List of radio stations in Central Region
- List of radio stations in Northern Region
- List of radio stations in Greater Accra Region
- List of radio stations in Brong-Ahafo Region
- List of radio stations in Upper East Region
- List of radio stations in Upper West Region
- List of radio stations in Volta Region
- List of radio stations in Ashanti Region

== See also ==
- Media of Ghana
- List of newspapers in Ghana
- Telecommunications in Ghana
- New Media in Ghana
