= Daily Mail (disambiguation) =

The Daily Mail is a British tabloid, published by the Daily Mail and General Trust.

Daily Mail may also refer to:

== Newspapers ==
- Accra Daily Mail, Ghanaian newspaper formerly published in Accra
- Bangkok Daily Mail, defunct newspaper published in Thailand
- Charleston Daily Mail, defunct American newspaper once published in West Virginia
- Daily Mail (Brisbane), defunct Australian newspaper
- Daily Mail (Hagerstown), American newspaper formerly published in Hagerstown, Maryland
- Hull Daily Mail, British newspaper published in East Yorkshire
- Irish Daily Mail, an edition of the UK Daily Mail published in the Republic of Ireland and in Northern Ireland
- Olney Daily Mail, American newspaper
- The Rand Daily Mail, South African newspaper formerly published in Johannesburg
- Zambia Daily Mail, Zambian newspaper published in Lusaka

== Other usages ==
- "The Daily Mail", a song by alternative rock band Radiohead

== See also ==
- Daily (disambiguation)
- Mail (disambiguation)
