= Daily Guide =

Daily Guide may refer to:

- The Daily Guide, a daily newspaper published in Pulaski County, Missouri, United States
- Daily Guide (Ghana), a daily newspaper published in Accra, Ghana
