= Tumi Phake =

South African fitness entrepreneur

- Born: Itumeleng Phake; Katlehong, South Africa
- Education: University of South Africa, Virginia Commonwealth University
- Occupation: Entrepreneur
- Years active: 2014-present
- Organization: Zenzele Group
- Known for: Entrepreneurship
- Awards: South Africa Entrepreneur of the year

Tumi Phake is a South African entrepreneur, he is the CEO of Zenzele Group and he was named South African SME Entrepreneur of the Year in 2017. Phake is also the South African ambassador for the Young African Initiative (YALI).

== Background ==
Born Itumeleng Phake, Tumi Phake was born in Katlehong, South Africa and he grew up in Tembisa, Gauteng where he had his early education. He then enrolled for a Financial Management degree at the University of South Africa through a bursary. In 2016, during his time as Young African Initiative (YALI) ambassador he studied at Virginia Commonwealth University in the United States of America and during the program he also studied Business and Entrepreneurship.

Tumi began his career at First National Bank where he also served as a junior board member, he the joined Rand Merchant Bank (RMB), and in 2014 he left the banking to startup Zenzele Group, through which he has investments in fitness, sportswear, technology, healthcare supplement and renewable energy. He successfully obtained initial seed funding to launch his business and subsequently secured additional investment for growth, enabling him to expand and scale the company.

In 2015, Tumi Phake was named in the Mail & Guardian 200 Young South Africans list, then in 2016, he was selected as a South African ambassador for the Young African Leaders Initiative in the United States of America, a leadership program established by former president Barack Obama for young African Leaders.

In 2017 he was awarded South African entrepreneur of the Year Award and in 2019, he was ranked amongst the Most Influential Young South Africans in the business sector. In 2018, Tumi Phake received an Associate Award issued by Harvard Business School through Harambe Entrepreneur Alliance. He also was a finalist at the All Africa Business Leaders Awards curated by CNBC Africa in 2018, he was then awarded as Best African fitness Entrepreneur at the Tropics Business Summit in 2019 the same year he diversified his portfolio Zenzele Group portfolio into several subsidiary companies which include Zenzele Tech, Zen Nutrition, APARA Premium and Zenzele Health.
