= The Ghanaian Chronicle =

English newspaper in Ghana

Ghanaian Chronicle
- Type: Daily newspaper
- Language: English
- Headquarters: Accra, Ghana
- Website: thechronicle.com.gh

The Ghanaian Chronicle is an English-language daily newspaper published from Accra, Ghana. It has a circulation of 45,000 copies, making it the biggest private newspaper in Ghana.

== See also ==
- Media of Ghana
- List of newspapers in Ghana
