= Catholic Standard (Ghana) =

Ghanaian Catholic weekly newspaper

- Type: Weekly newspaper
- Format: Print
- Owner: Ghana Catholic Bishops' Conference
- Publisher: Standard Newspapers and Magazines Ltd.
- Founded: 1938
- Language: English
- Headquarters: Accra, Ghana
- ISSN: 0855-5664
- Website: catholicstandardghana.com

Catholic Standard is a Ghanaian Catholic weekly newspaper published by Standard Newspapers and Magazines Ltd. on behalf of the Ghana Catholic Bishops' Conference (GCBC). Established in 1938, it is the only national Catholic weekly newspaper in Ghana and is among the country's oldest surviving newspapers.

== History ==
According to academic research, The Standard was restructured under Standard Newspapers and Magazines Ltd. and adopted the name Catholic Standard in 1976.

The newspaper's operations were relocated from Cape Coast to Accra in 1977 to improve access to printing, advertising and distribution facilities.

The newspaper celebrated its 70th anniversary in 2008 and its 80th anniversary in 2018, marking more than eight decades of publication and service to Catholic journalism in Ghana.

== Suspension during the PNDC era ==
The Catholic Standard became increasingly involved in public affairs during the period of military rule in Ghana through its editorials and feature articles, which commented on political developments and criticised perceived abuses and restrictions on civil liberties.

On 13 December 1985, the Provisional National Defence Council (PNDC) government revoked the newspaper's registration and banned its publication, alleging that its reporting jeopardised the national interest and undermined the government.

The newspaper remained out of circulation until 1992 following Ghana's return to constitutional rule under the Fourth Republic.

Archbishop Charles Palmer-Buckle, who served as acting editor of the newspaper during the period, later recalled that the newspaper was targeted because of its editorial criticism of the PNDC administration.

== Editorial role ==
Academic research has found that the editorial focus of the Catholic Standard has evolved alongside Ghana's political development. While the newspaper initially concentrated on religious news, it gradually expanded its coverage to include political, social and economic issues. During periods of military rule, it increasingly used its features and editorials to comment on political developments and criticise perceived abuses and restrictions on civil liberties. Since the restoration of constitutional rule in 1992, the newspaper has placed greater emphasis on political issues, civic education and national development while continuing its religious mission.

== Publication ==
The Catholic Standard is published weekly in English by Standard Newspapers and Magazines Ltd., a publishing company owned principally by the Ghana Catholic Bishops' Conference.

The newspaper publishes news, editorials, opinion pieces, pastoral messages and feature articles covering religion, governance, education, health, social affairs and national issues from a Catholic perspective.

== Legacy ==
The Catholic Standard is one of Ghana's oldest surviving newspapers and remains the country's only national Catholic weekly newspaper.

Academic studies have identified the newspaper as an important medium through which the Catholic Church has participated in national discourse and contributed to civic education and public debate in Ghana.

Its suspension during the PNDC era and subsequent resumption in 1992 have been cited as part of the wider history of press freedom and media development in Ghana.

== See also ==
- Media of Ghana
