= Daily Graphic (Ghana) =

Ghanaian newspaper

Ghana Daily Graphic
- Front cover of the Daily Graphic on 30 November 1996
- Type: Daily newspaper
- Owner: Ghanaian state-owned
- Founded: 1950
- Language: English
- Headquarters: Accra, Ghana
- Circulation: 100,000
- Website: www.graphic.com.gh

The Daily Graphic is a Ghanaian state-owned daily newspaper published in Accra, Ghana.

== History ==
The paper was established along with the Sunday Mirror in 1950, by Cecil King of the London Daily Mirror Group. With a circulation of 100,000 copies, the Graphic is the most widely read daily newspaper in the country. The paper has seen many editors replaced over the course of its history, particularly post-independence, after a string of successive military coups that resulted in the sacking editors who opposed the government policies. In 1979 the newspaper was renamed the People's Daily Graphic under Jerry Rawlings for a few years to "remind the people that it belongs to them".

Being a state-owned paper, it regularly covers the government in a favourable light, detailing and encouraging national unity and government policy. In colonial Ghana under British rule, the paper, which was staffed by local Ghanaians, received large government funding from British banks, which led to its high circulation and raising awareness of events to ordinary Ghanaians, more so than Ghanaian-owned papers.

The paper, owned by the Graphic Communications Group Limited, also prints two weekly entertainment newspapers, namely The Mirror and Graphic Showbiz. Graphic Sports, the most read sports news in Ghana, is also a product of the company. The company also publishes the Junior Graphic, aimed at a younger audience, the Graphic Business, a business and financial paper, the Graphic Advertiser, a free ads paper, and the Nsɛmpa, a regional weekly for the Ashanti Region.

Ghana's other state-owned paper is the Ghanaian Times. Graphic Nsempa was discontinued and the company re-launched its News Website Graphic Online in 2012 and it is currently among the top five news websites in the country according to Alexa.

== See also ==
- List of newspapers in Ghana
- Mass media in Ghana
