= Street Library Ghana =

- Founded: 2011
- Location: Accra, Ghana
- Region served: West Africa
- Key people: Hayford Siaw (Founder and President)
- Website: www.streetlibraryghana.org

Street Library Ghana (SLG) is a volunteer-driven, social enterprise based in Ghana that aims to improve the life chances of children and youth in vulnerable communities by addressing literacy and education issues.

SLG offers library services in rural communities to reach at-risk and underserved children and provide them with access to quality literature. The modes of operation are a mobile van, a book kiosk, a community and school book box, and digital access. The street library model also involves the use of trained staff or local/international volunteers to actively engage children in activities such as mentoring and leadership training, reading, and educational exercises.

== History ==
As a child, Hayford grew up in various parts of Ghana because of his father's work. In all ten communities he lived in prior to finishing elementary school, he had the opportunity to visit a library only once, and that was in the capital of the Eastern Region of Ghana. He developed a love of reading that eventually helped him enter development work, where he repeatedly encountered many children in rural communities who had no access to books other than their school grades. Many children as old as 18 years were illiterate. When he conducted interviews with villagers in the summer of 2011 as part of health-related field research, he realized the serious impact illiteracy and a lack of basic education has on the health of the population. The ignorance-based misunderstandings he experienced were overwhelming and disheartening. This realization eventually led to a profound understanding of some deep-rooted societal issues related to the lack of basic education. In August 2011, Hayford established a mobile library by collecting books from volunteers in his trunk to provide to children in rural villages. Working closely with communities, Hayford drove his car into communities and invited children to read. In early 2012, the Street Library was accepted into Reach for Change's three-year incubation program, which provides funding and technical assistance to help fledgling child-focused initiatives succeed. The Global Fund for Children has also since supported Street Library in various ways to increase its impact, influence, and growth.

== Key Issues ==
Ghana has a relatively low literacy rate of 71.5% among those over 15 years of age, due in part to a severe lack of educational infrastructure, particularly in rural areas. A chronic lack of interesting reading material inhibits the development of interest in reading. Indeed, the consumption of books and other literature (e.g., newspapers) is relatively low in Ghana. There are numerous reasons for this, including the poor quality and quantity of public libraries (only 63 in a population of 25 million, or about 400,000 people per library), a low average income, high cost of printed materials, and the lack of appealing publications in both English and other indigenous languages.

The founder and president of Street Library Ghana, Hayford Siaw, asserts that the concept of the street library does not require a physical structure to provide children with an opportunity to read. There is no reason to deny children reading just because the government does not have money to build a library for them.

SLG aims to address the lack of reading material by providing access to a variety of literary styles with high quality and engaging titles. The program differs from traditional library initiatives in that it engages children through activities that make reading and learning more enjoyable and worthwhile. This, in turn, is expected to increase academic achievement in all reading-related subjects, setting in motion a positive cycle of improved motivation, achievement, and attitude towards education.

== Programs ==
In providing books, library services, and literacy instruction, SLG works with four modalities: mobile van, book box, reading center, and digital app. Each meets needs in a particular way:

- Mobile Van
  Since 2011, Street Library Ghana has operated a mobile library that visits various communities, bringing both books and staff to engage children in outreach activities. Dedicated staff accompany the van and engage children in activities such as reading and educational exercises. The area of operation for this campaign is Eastern Ghana and the Greater Accra area.
- Street Library Book Chest
  Book Chests are collections of approximately 150 children's books covering a wide range of reading levels, nonfiction, and fiction genres. They are intended as portable libraries for schools and communities.
- Reading Hub / Library Kiosk

== Partnerships ==
- Reach for Change
- Global Fund for Children
- Tigo Ghana
- Viasat 1
- Ghana Post
- Bayer Care Foundation
- TaleXchange
- TransCAP Foundation
- Architecture Sans Frontiers-UK
- Volunteer Partnerships for West Africa
- NGO News Africa

== Volunteering ==
Through its close relationship with Volunteer Partnerships for West Africa (VPWA), SLG has been involved in volunteer recruitment and placement since 2011. It recognizes the role of volunteers in their areas of service. The recruitment process allows both skilled professionals and students to work with SLG and its partner projects, and contributes directly to the achievement of the Millennium Development Goals. Both local and international volunteers are accepted. In addition to volunteering locally, those who are unable to travel to Ghana have the opportunity to work virtually with SLG through the United Nations Online Volunteer Service.

Various opportunities are posted and updated regularly on the SLG and VPWA websites.

== Funding ==
Street Library Ghana currently relies on multiple funding sources to support its initiatives. As a non-profit organization, Street Library is primarily funded by soliciting grants from committed donors and development agencies, as well as corporate sponsorships. Notable major sponsors include Global Fund for Children, Reach for Change, telecommunications company Tigo, and television company ViaSat 1. Donations are sometimes accepted from civic organizations and individuals through book collections. A placement fee for volunteers provides a regular source of income.
