= Video games in Ghana =

The video game industry is a young industry in Ghana, and has been developing in the country since the early 1980s. Leti Arts is one of the emerging video game companies in Africa. Leti Arts was founded by two pioneers in the African video game industry, Eyram Tawia and Wesley Kirinya in 2009. Eyram Tawia is the CEO of Leti Arts. Both game developers were originally based on two opposite sides of the continent and came together to bring African games and digital comics to a worldwide audience. They aim to showcase Africa's contributions to digital content creation and challenge stereotypes to prevent misrepresentation in Africa.

In 2007, Wesley Kirinya launched his first independent release, The Adventures of Nyang. The game was inspired by Tomb Raider and is set in Kenya with Kenyan characters. Since founding Leti Arts, Kirinya and Tawia have launched several games including Connectricity, Africa's Legends, Sweave, Puzzle Scout, and more. With the release of various games, Ghana's video game industry is expanding at a steady pace. In 2024, the projected revenue in the video games market in Ghana is expected to reach US$135.50m and is anticipated to show an annual growth rate of 8.23%.

The Leti Art organization works closely with foreign and domestic marketing agencies and telecommunications companies like Vodafone, Publicis West Africa, and Afroes. These companies work to promote and boost Ghana's video game industry. Leti has offices based in Accra, Ghana, and Nairobi Kenya.

In August 2016, Ghana's Gaming Commission, which regulates gambling within the country, stated that it does not regulate video games as long as no bets are placed on players.

Organizations such as Gamer TV, Madagastar Esports, AnTrix Gaming, GameNerd, Giiks Gaming City and GasBros Gaming Network are pioneers in the industry. Video gaming and gamers have been the rise for the last decade. Primarily tournaments are used to bring gamers around to associate and expand the gaming space. Events like the Annual Global Game Jam have greatly helped in the establishment of gaming as a career choice. Organisations like Virtual Union and Gamers' Republic are pushing for pro gamers and associations like the Ghana E-sports Association are pushing to usher in a new era for E-sports in Ghana. Tournaments are also held in major cities like Accra and Kumasi. Video Gaming and eSports in general is slowly been accepted and integrated into the Ghanaian culture.

The emergence of E-sports arenas like Yetra and Arena233 marks a significant development in the gaming culture in Ghana and across Africa. These dedicated venues are spaces for playing video games; International events are held in locations like this. An example is the qualifiers to the League Of legend and DOTA tournaments.

Organisations like MTN Ghana have had been sponsoring some tournaments like the MTN Conquest yearly to host nurture the E-sports scene in the country. They have also organised the conferences like the MTN gaming Conference, which brings developers and consumers alike to show and celebrate video games in Ghana.

== Video game development ==
=== Game developers of Ghana ===
- Leti Arts
- Mhiracle
- Dobiison
- Kofiro
- Melbet
- OGames Studio
- GlitchCut Games

==== Misc games ====
- Twin Drums (Remote studio based in Berlin, Accra, & North America. Online games.)
