= Accra Daily Mail =

Newspaper

Accra Daily Mail was an English-language daily newspaper from Accra, Ghana. The paper, which is privately owned, was started in 1998. The daily ceased publication in January 2009 due to financial problems. In April 2009 the paper was relaunched with the name The Mail. Its frequency was also changed to biweekly.

== Website ==
- Website

== See also ==
- List of newspapers in Ghana
