= Prostitution in Ghana =

Prostitution is illegal but widespread in Ghana, so much so that many Ghanaians are unaware that it is prohibited. There are growing sex tourism, child prostitution and human trafficking. High rates of unemployment and poverty in Ghana are believed to be causing a drastic growth in the sex industry. Unemployment is a reason for teenagers engaging in the sex trade. A high percentage of sex workers are vulnerable to HIV.

Some prostitutes in Ghana are campaigning for the sex trade to be legalised, and discussions have taken place.

Ghana's former Prime Minister, Dr Kofi Abrefa Busia, an Oxford sociologist, wrote a thesis on prostitution "Report on a social survey of Sekondi-Takoradi".

== Overview ==
Prostitutes in Ghana are known locally as "ashawo", "toutou" (derived from 'two shillings, two pence'; a prostitute who doesn't charge much) or "maame-i-dey". There are brothels in most Ghana towns, cities and ports. Often these are in makeshift shacks or old warehouses, and some are attached to bars. Prostitutes not working in the brothels are known as either "seaters" or "roamers". The seaters work from home, sitting in the doorway and inviting customers in. When they are with a customer they lower a curtain in front of the door. Seaters generally work in one area of town, creating a small red-light district. Generally, they are older women or widows.

Roamers tend to be younger women and work on the streets, bars and hotels. "Pilots", often taxi-drivers, work as intermediaries between the women and clients in hotels. They usually get a fee from both parties. They also help the women get into the hotels as most have a no single women rule. Hotel staff may also take bribes to let the women in.

The women face occasional violence from the customers, or more commonly refusal to pay. Hotel staff may exploit them.

Since oil production started in 2011, prostitution in the port of Takoradi has risen sharply due to the influx of oil workers.

UNAIDS estimate there are 52,000 prostitutes in the country.

=== History ===
Abrakrees were "public women" or prostitutes among some Akan states of the Gold Coast between the 17th and 19th centuries. These public women were made up of slaves and outcasts. Olfert Dapper documented on the abrakrees in the 1668 where he noted their presence in Axim and its surrounding areas. The Abrakrees operated under the Kabaseros or headmen according to Dapper. He also documented the ceremonies carried out by the kabaseros which initiated the abrakrees into work.

Although the Blacks along this coast and in the interior marry as many wives as they can maintain, it is customary in Atzijn [Axim] and all the surrounding areas, as far as the Quaqua Coast, for every village to maintain two or three whores, whom they call Abrakrees. They are initiated and confirmed for the conduct of this work by their Kabaseros or headmen in the presence of a large crowd of people, in the following manner. First they place these whores, who are certain purchased slaves, with many foolish and ridiculous ceremonies upon a straw mat and display them. Then one of the oldest among them, standing up, takes a young hen, opens its beak with a knife and lets a few drops of blood drip on her head, shoulders and arms. At the same time, she utters upon it terrible adjurations, saying that [she?] shall die unless she accept as lover for three of four kakraven (worth two or three stuivers), notwithstanding the applicants be of rich means; and this without excluding their own blood relatives. Everything she gains in this way she must hand to the Kabasero, and in return she enjoys the liberty of being allowed to take any food, whether it stands in someone's house or in the market, for her sustenance, and nobody may prevent her from doing so, upon a fixed penalty. When this has happened, one person from the crowd is sent to one side with her and, upon their return, testifies that she has been found to be not a man but a woman. Then her companion, namely the other Abrakree or whore, takes her home; she is washed, and a clean bed-sheet is wrapped around her. She then sits down on the mat, a bracelet of beads is put on her arm, and her shoulders, arms and breast are painted with lime or chalk. Finally this Abrakree is put on a stool and carried by two young men on their shoulders; they run into the village with much cheering by those following them, and they greatly enjoy themselves dancing and drinking palm or bordon wine. On eight consecutive days thereafter she goes to sit at her appointed place, where all passers-by must give her two or three kakraven...

— Dapper.

Professor of history Akyeampong, states that the abrakree served as a public service rather than an institution to acquire wealth though sex work. It was the chief that received the remuneration paid to the abrakree.

In 1702, Willem Bosman confirmed Dapper’s account on the abrakrees of Axim. He comments in addition, that the states of Komenda, Elmina, Fetu, Asebu and possibly the Fante "have none of these whores." Jean Gadot published an account on the abrakree in 1704 following his visit to Assini, west of Axim in Ivory Coast around 1701. He wrote that the King of Assini maintained six women in all villages and towns to provide services to bachelors. They wrapped their heads with white linen in order to be distinguished from other women. The abrakree lived on the town's outskirt. Married men who utilized the services of Assini's abrakree were punished and fined. Another variant of public women were priestesses. In 1851, Anthony van der Eb described the public women in Ahanta as "fetish women who were slaves initiated into priesthood." According to historian Akyeampong, "These slaves, as soon as they reached marriageable age, were initiated by the priests and priestesses. They were made available to every man for the payment of a small amount in gold-dust, except for the men who first slept with them after the initiation. These men were obliged to pay a larger sum which was used for the purchase of new girls for the profession. Of this fee, part was given to the male or female owners."

There also existed prostitutes among the Akan states that were not slaves, in contrast to the public women. For instance, they were documented in 1602 by Pieter de Marees. In the early 18th century, Bosman wrote of the women in Elmina, Fetu, Asebu and probably the Fante, who engaged in sexual activities in exchange for negotiated price. In the early 19th century, Thomas Edward Bowdich reported on prostitution in the Ashanti Empire;

Prostitutes are numerous and countenanced. No Ashantee forces his daughter to become the wife of the man he wishes, but he instantly disclaims her support and protection on her refusal, and would persecute the mother if she afforded it; thus abandoned, they would have no resource but prostitution.

— Bowdich.

== Male prostitution ==
The prevalence of male prostitution in Ghana has slowly risen over the years but not much is said about it because of the form it takes. Male prostitution is predominant in the following areas such as Tesano, Adabraka, Osu, Accra and Paloma in Accra. Male prostitutes go undercover as women because homosexuality is illegal in Ghana as per the constitution. The activities of these prostitutes are most commonly patronized by men in the elite class who have enough resources to be discreet about their sexual activities. This leads to a relevant increase in the price of engaging homosexual prostitutes given the limited supply of these prostitutes. Male prostitution like female prostitution in Ghana is a complex issue driven by interconnected economic, social, psychological and structural factor rather than a specific or single cause. Given the economic hardships, poverty levels, increasing youth unemployment and limited educational as well as employment opportunities, young men are compelled to resort to transactional sex as a means of survival or financial advancement. The history of male prostitution in Ghana is poorly documented, with most historical research fixated instead on same-sex relationships and male sexuality , Evidence indicates that same sex relationships existed in some pre-colonial Ghanaian societies, although these should not be equated with the modern concepts of homosexuality or male prostitution. Historical scholars therefore suggest the existence of same sex intimacy without establishing a formal history of male commercial sex. The colonial period marked an important change as British administration introduced legal restrictions on male same sex sexual activity. These laws continued post-independence through Ghana's 1960 criminal code, contributing to an environment in which male same sex relationships and potentially associated forms of transactional sex could be concealed because of legal and social consequences. Contemporary research provides considerably robust evidence of male transactional sex. The Ghana Men's Study II documented men selling sex to male partners across multiple regions, demonstrating that the practice extends beyond a single urban setting. More recent national research involving 3448 men who have sex with men found that 44.8% reported transactional sex, with higher levels among younger participants, those with lower educational accomplishments and participants in Greater Accra. The study also identified associations with stigma, alcohol use and experiences of forced sex. The historical development of male prostitution in Ghana is therefore better understood as a shift from limited historical documentation and social concealment toward greater contemporary recognition and research. Modern scholars increasingly use the term transactional sex because exchanges may involve money, accommodation, goods or other material benefits and do not always constitute conventional commercial sex. HIV and public health research has also increased visibility of the issue by examining transactional sex alongside sexual-health risks, stigma, violence and access to healthcare.

== Law enforcement ==
Law enforcement is variable, and there are also occasional crackdowns on prostitutes. Prostitutes are often abused by law enforcement officers. In a survey across 26 town and cities, a third of the prostitutes told of problems with the police. These included intimidation, extortion, threats and raids. Many reported that they had had to have sex with the officers to avoid prosecution.

In a 2007 survey of 251 law enforcement agents, 15% admitted they had demanded sex in return for not prosecuting arrested prostitutes.

Police and politicians are sometimes bribed or blackmailed to turn a blind eye.

== Sex tourism ==
Ghana has established itself as a destination for sex tourism from western tourists. This kind of tourism has attracted paedophiles due to the country's lax child protection laws and poor law enforcement. Child prostitution is increasing is a problem with girls being vulnerable and boys to a lesser extent.

== Sex trafficking ==
Vietnamese prostitutes have been found in Ghana in the coastal cities of Tema and Takoradi. Ghanaian investigative journalist Anas Aremeyaw Anas discovered that the Vietnamese women had been trafficked into Ghana for the purposes of prostitution. The Vietnamese prostitutes had been recruited by a Vietnamese woman named Hanh in July 2013. The price paid by their clients in Ghana was US$100 per hour. The prostitutes worked from a brothel in the Jang Mi Guest House in Takoradi. The women's ages ranged from 25 to 35.

Women and girls from China, Nigeria, Côte d'Ivoire and Burkina Faso are also trafficked into Ghana for prostitution.

The United States Department of State Office to Monitor and Combat Trafficking in Persons ranks Ghana as a 'Tier 2' country.

== See also ==
- Prostitution in Africa
