= Okoman Radio =

Radio station in Akropong, Ghana

Okoman Radio (Ghana)
Akropong; Ghana
- Broadcast area: Eastern Region
- Frequency: 97.1 MHz,

Programming
- Languages: Twi, English
- Format: Local news, business, talk, sports, politics and music

History
- First air date: May 2021

Technical information
- Transmitter coordinates: 5°58′27″N 0°5′17″W

Links
- Website: https://okomanradio.com/#

Okoman Radio is a private radio station in the Eastern Region of Ghana. The radio station is located in Akropong, the capital of the Akuapim North District, a district in the Eastern Region. It was established in May 2021 and It covers local news, politics, business, entertainment and other issues in Ghana
