= Leti Arts =

Ghanaian video game company

- Type: Public
- Industry: Video games
- Founders: Eyram Tawia
- Headquarters: Ghana
- Website: letiarts.com

Leti Arts is a Ghanaian video game company headquartered in Accra. It was founded by Eyram Tawia, a member of the Harambe Entrepreneur Alliance.

== Founder ==
Leti Arts was developed by Eyram Tawia, a Ghanaian video game developer and entrepreneur.
