= International rankings of Ghana =

How Ghana is ranked internationally

There are the international rankings of Ghana.

== Economy ==
- The Heritage Foundation/The Wall Street Journal Index of Economic Freedom ranked 91 out of 157
- World Economic Forum Global Competitiveness Report not ranked

== Politics ==
- Reporters Without Borders Worldwide Press Freedom Index ranked 31 out of 173
- Transparency International: Corruption Perception Index ranked 69 out of 179

== Society ==
- Institute for Economics and Peace: Global Peace Index ranked 52 out of 144
- United Nations Development Programme: Human Development Index ranked 135 out of 177
- Vision of Humanity: Global Peace Index ranked 40 out of 121

== International rankings ==
The following are links to international rankings of Ghana.

Index	Rank	Countries reviewed
Environmental Performance Index 2012	91st	132
Pilot Trend Environmental Performance Index 2012	28th	132
Global Gender Gap Report Global Gender Gap Index 2012	71st	135
Global Innovation Index (WIPO) 2026	101st	139
Human Development Index 2012	135th	187
Happy Planet Index 2012	86th	151
Sustainable Society Index 2012	52nd	153
Global Peace Index 2012	50th	158
Economic freedom 2012	77th	185
Ease of doing business index 2012	63rd	185

According to speedtest.net, Ghana has the 5th fastest Internet download and upload speeds on the Africa continent and the 94th fastest Internet download and upload speeds in the world out of 184 listed with an average download speed of 5.68 Mbit/s and upload speed of 3.88 Mbit/s.

== Other ==
Organization	Survey	Ranking
Institute for Economics and Peace	Global Peace Index	50 out of 158
The Heritage Foundation/The Wall Street Journal	Index of Economic Freedom	91 out of 157
Reporters Without Borders	Worldwide Press Freedom Index	31 out of 173
Transparency International	Corruption Perception Index	69 out of 179
United Nations Development Programme	Human Development Index	135 out of 177
Vision of Humanity	Global Peace Index	40 out of 121
World Economic Forum	Global Competitiveness Report	not ranked
