= News Ghana =

Ghanaian news portal

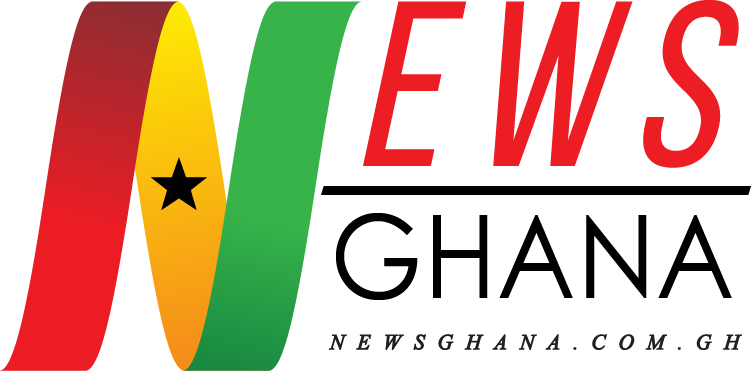
- Company type: News Portal
- Founded: 2012
- Founders: Roger A. Agana
- Owners: M'ideas Group
- Website: www.newsghana.com.gh

News Ghana is a Ghanaian independent news portal. Its one of the most visited website in Ghana, with 200,000 average daily visits.

== History ==
News Ghana formerly known as Spy Ghana started in 2010 as a news blog and became a News Portal in January 2013. Spy Ghana also made world headlines for the wrong reasons in 2012. News Ghana is managed by Roger A. Agana, who is co-founder, former general manager and editor of ModernGhana The parent company of News Ghana is M'ideas Group with operations throughout Africa specializing in news reporting, public relations, advertisement, product review, search engine optimization (SEO), domain registration, web hosting and designing.

== Market share ==
According to statistics from web traffic analytics company Alexa Internet, News Ghana has a market share of 53.3% from Ghana, 17.2% from India, 14.1% from Nigeria, 2.7% from USA, 1.3% from Germany.

== See also ==
- Media of Ghana
