= Harambe Entrepreneur Alliance =

US-based business network

- Formation: 2008; 17 years ago
- Type: Nonprofit organization
- Website: www.harambeans.com

The Harambe Entrepreneur Alliance is a US-based business network for African entrepreneurs that provides funding, university scholarships and a support ecosystem.

The Alliance was founded by Okendo Lewis-Gayle and is supported by Cisco and the Oppenheimer Generations Foundation, amongst others. Members of the Harambe Alliance have raised over $500 million from Google Ventures, the Chan Zuckerberg Initiative and Alibaba to support their ventures.

The organization's name is derived from the Swahili word Harambee, which means, "working together towards a common purpose".

== Partnerships ==
The Alliance is supported by and is partnered with:

- Cisco Systems
- Oppenheimer Generations Foundation
- The IDP Foundation
- The Fletcher School of Law and Diplomacy
- Yale School of Management
- Saïd Business School

== Notable Members ==
- Eyram Tawia, founder of Leti Arts
- Iyinoluwa Aboyeji, former MD of Flutterwave and co-founder of Andela
- Lungisa Matshoba, CTO of Yoco
- Kelechi Ofoegbu, COO of Impact Hub Accra
- Adeteyo Bamiduro of Max.ng
