= Social conduct in Ghana =

Republic of Ghana
(Social conduct in Ghana)

Flag of Ghana

In general, Ghanaians emphasize communal values such as family, the importance of dignity, and proper social conduct.

== Conduct ==
Ghanaians' individual conduct is seen as impacting their entire family, social group, and community; therefore everyone is expected to be respectful, dignified, and observant in public settings and most aspects of life.

== Greetings ==
When greeting people in a home, it is considered improper if the guest ignores anyone present. Guests are expected to acknowledge and greet every person at a social occasion, including children and babies.

When shaking hands, it is appropriate for the guest to first greet the person on their right-hand side, and then work their way left. This ensures that the guest's palm makes contact with the palm of the person receiving the handshake – touching the back of the hand instead of the palm is considered insulting or unlucky. Guests are expected to greet the most elderly person present first.

The same ritual is expected to be observed upon departure and should be carried out until sufficient familiarity has been established, at which point the ritual becomes redundant.

When greeting dignitaries, this procedure is expected to be carried out by all persons present regardless of age or status.

== Invitations ==
Asking a person to a social event (e.g. a bar or a restaurant) implies that the person offering the invitation will pay for everything. Inviting people out and then expecting them to pay for themselves is considered extremely rude. When a foreigner is invited to visit a home or community, the guest is expected to bring a gift, commonly a bottle of Schnapps or Kasapreko gin which is available in any shop.

== Special occasions ==
Naming ceremonies and marriages are marked by family ceremonies. Seasonal festivals serve to bring people together in a spectacular fashion.

When attending funerals, weddings, or naming ceremonies; women, including foreign women, must cover their heads with a hat or simple black cloth wound around the head. A man must not have his head covered.

== Miscellaneous ==
It is unacceptable for women, particularly young foreign women, to wear revealing clothing. Women's clothing that would be acceptable in the West (shorts, low-cut strapped tops, etc.) is not socially acceptable in Ghanaian society. Similarly it is unacceptable for foreign men to be shirtless in public, and unacceptable for Ghanaian men to a lesser degree. Ghanaian social norms are sometimes difficult to establish as younger adults are generally much less inhibited about wearing revealing clothing or being shirtless. In contrast, older Ghanaian citizens may find such apparel to be insulting. A general rule is to dress conservatively unless in the company of people of one's own gender or age with whom one is well-acquainted.

Drinking alcohol and smoking in public are serious faux pas and should be avoided. Public intoxication to any degree is generally viewed with extreme disapproval. Such activities are perfectly acceptable in a local bar though. When drinking alcohol, it is a common custom to pour the last few drops on the ground as a libation for the gods. People who decline from drinking alcohol may accept an alcoholic drink with gratitude, raise it to their lips without drinking, and then pour it on the ground. Raising the glass to the lips signifies gratitude and pouring the drink away is thus a socially acceptable alternative for those who do not drink. This custom permits non-drinking Ghanaians to join social events without offending those present by refusing a drink.

Taking photographs of people unknown to the photographer must be conducted with the same level of consideration as in one's own country. Most Ghanaians are happy to pose for pictures, as it is considered polite.

== See also ==
- Ghana
- Etiquette
- Etiquette in Africa
