= Daily Guide (Ghana) =

Daily newspaper published in Accra, Ghana

- Type: Daily newspaper
- Owner: Blay Family
- Editor-in-chief: Fortune Alimi
- Editor: Samuel Amponsah Boadi
- Associate editor: Yaw Owusu
- News editor: Alhaji A.R Gomda
- Language: English
- ISSN: 0855-3165
- OCLC number: 272567023
- Website: www.dailyguideghana.com

Daily Guide is a private-owned daily newspaper owned by the Blay Family published in Accra, Ghana. The paper was started in 1984. This daily newspaper is published six times per week and is regarded as the most circulated independent paper in Ghana with a readership of about 50,000 copies a day. The editor of the newspaper is Samuel Amponsah Boadi, with Fortune Alimi as Executive Editor and Alhaji A.R Gomda as Chief News Editor.

== See also ==
- List of newspapers in Ghana
- Media of Ghana
