= National Information Technology Agency =

Agency overview
- Formed: 2008
- Jurisdiction: Government of Ghana
- Headquarters: Accra
- Agency executive: Director General Mr.Richard Okyere-Fosu
- Website: nita.gov.gh

National Information Technology Agency (NITA) is a public service institution established by Act 771 in 2008 as the ICT policy implementing arm of the Ministry of Communications of the Republic of Ghana. NITA is the agency responsible for implementing Ghana's IT policies.

== NITA ==
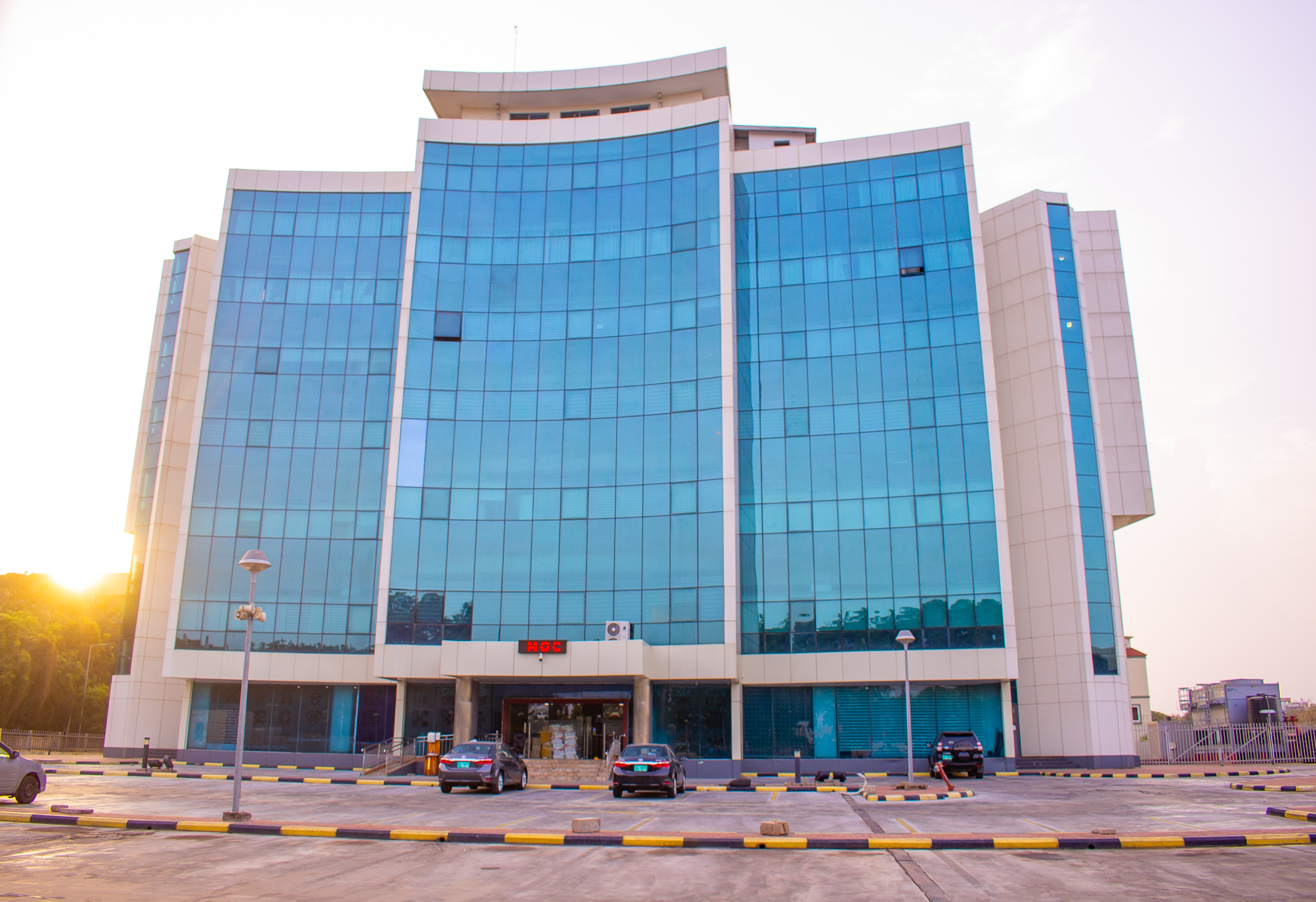
National Information Technology Agency

Its mandate includes identifying, promoting and developing innovative technologies, standards, guidelines and practices among government agencies and local governments, as well as ensuring the sustainable growth of ICT via research & development planning and technology acquisition strategies to facilitate Ghana's prospect of becoming a technology-driven, knowledge-and values-based economy as espoused in the e-Ghana project which ideally seeks to assist the Government generate growth and employment, by leveraging ICT and public-private partnerships.

=== e-Ghana project ===
The establishment of the National Information Technology Agency is essential for e-Government to take off in Ghana. E-Government, being an essential component of the e-Ghana project will contribute to improved efficiency, transparency and accountability in selected Government functions.

=== Objectivity ===
The objects of NITA are to:

- Regulate the provision of information communications technology.
- Ensure the provision of quality information communications technology.
- Promote standards of efficiency.
- Ensure high quality of service

== See also ==
- Ghana Open Data Initiative
- Ghana Government Online Services Portal - eServices
- Ghana Government Payment Portal
