= Ghana Open Data Initiative =

Government agency

- Ghana Open Data Initiative

Agency overview
- Formed: January 2012
- Jurisdiction: Government of Ghana
- Headquarters: Accra
- Agency executives: Mr. Kwaku Ofosu-Adarkwa, Steering Committee Chair; Prof. Nii Narku Quaynor, Steering Committee Co-Chair; Mr. William Tevie, Project Director; Mr. Eric Akumiah, Project Manager; Dr. Edwin A. Opare, Technical Lead & Open Data Evangelist
- Parent agency: National Information Technology Agency
- Website: data.gov.gh

Ghana Open Data Initiative (GODI) was started in January 2012 by the National Information Technology Agency (NITA) in partnership with the Web Foundation (WF), to make Government of Ghana data available to the public for re-use. The establishment of GODI is meant to promote efficiency, transparency and accountability in governance as well as to facilitate economic growth by means of the creation of Mobile and Web applications for the Ghanaian and world markets. The project was scheduled for completion in 2014 and aimed to create a sustainable Open Data ecosystem for Ghana. GODI was launched with a 100 data sets categorized as political, legal, organizational, technical, social or economic. The vision of GODI is to develop an open data community involving the Government of Ghana, civil society organizations, industry, developer communities, academia, media practitioners, and the citizenry, to interact with one another with the aim of developing an open data portal to bring about transparency, accountability and efficiency in government.

== History ==
At the close of 2011, the president of the Republic of Ghana, His Excellency Prof. J.E. Mills, signed the Open Government Partnership (OGP), a global initiative started by the United States government. The OGP is a new multilateral initiative that aims to secure concrete commitments from governments to promote transparency, empower citizens, fight corruption, and harness new technologies to strengthen governance. In the spirit of multistakeholder collaboration, the OGP is overseen by a steering committee of governments, civil society organizations, academia and the developer community.

Prior to Ghana signing onto the OGP, the World Wide Web Foundation (WF) had conducted feasibility studies in Ghana and Chile as special case studies for developing countries and published the report in February 2011. On the basis of the feasibility report, the National Information Technology Agency (NITA), an agency of the Ministry of Communications, which was created by an Act of Parliament to oversee and implement government policy on Information and Communication Technology (ICT), began discussions with the WF in April 2011 on how to develop an open government portal in Ghana.

NITA over the last three years has been deploying a massive government network dubbed the GovNET across the country and data centers which will be repositories of Government data. NITA has also been mandated to engage the citizenry with government by providing e-Services platforms to serve the citizenry with services like online passport application, business and birth and death registration which NITA is executing with 11 pilot e-service platforms.

On the initial signing of the OGP commitment by the embassy of Ghana in the US in September 2011, NITA intensified its discussions with the WF on developing a national plan to create an open data portal where government could make its data available in a format that civil society organizations (CSOs), the developer community, academia, the media and industry could re-use. These discussions culminated in a visit to Ghana by a team from the WF during which a strategic plan was developed at a formal stakeholders’ meeting which took place in Accra, where the initiative was duly launched. The visiting WF team and NITA officials paid a courtesy call on the then Vice President His Excellency John Dramani Mahama to invite him to champion the Ghana Open Data Initiative.

== Relevance of open government data to Ghana ==
Open government data is particularly important to low and middle income countries like Ghana because:

- Transparency and accountability are critical dimensions for foreign aid and investments, which in turn is essential for social and economic development. The potential of ICT in developing countries to provide basic services in health, education, business and governance has been highlighted for more than a decade by the WSIS.
- Easy access to government-held data reduces risks and transaction costs in the economic sector, thus reducing barriers to growth.
- Citizen inclusion and participation in government agenda have been historically low in developing countries, particularly due to lack of information and infrastructure. Increasing such citizen participation has proven to be essential for the establishment of stable democratic processes.
- Data on government services is capable of attracting groups and organizations to form communities whose activities can improved social capital and economic growth.

== Development of GODI ==
=== Executive level ===
The WF feasibility report indicated that the Government of Ghana has the political will to make information transparently available to its citizens. In January 2012, then vice president of Ghana, John Mahama, informed a delegation from the WF that he was committed to championing the GODI at the cabinet level.

=== Public administration level ===
The feasibility report of the WF indicated that government departments and agencies are in support of OGD initiatives. Substantial information is already available in digital format; however, end user access still remains on paper which imparts negatively on the access and reuse of information. Since January 2012 when the GODI started, several public administrators have indicated their willingness to provide data in the format required to contribute to the project.

=== Civil society level ===
The WF feasibility report indicated that there is already a movement towards reuse of information driven by organizations like the Population Council as well as universities that are advocating the access to raw data for their studies.

== Organogram ==
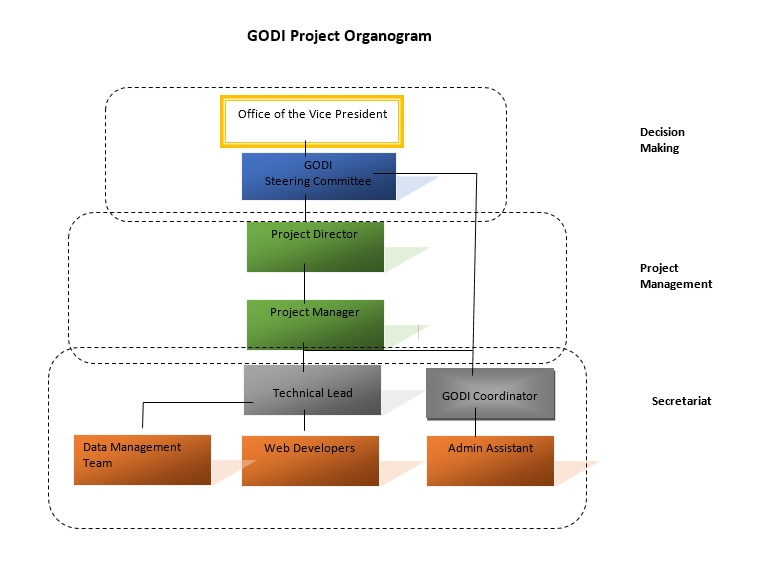

== Implementation ==
The National Information Technology Agency (NITA) is the implementing agency for the Ghana Open Data Initiative (GODI). The GODI portal was developed on the fourth thematic area of the Open Government Partnership.

The objectives of the GODI project are to:

- Provide a central platform for access to public government data.
- Bring about the development of the open data community.
- Promote participation between government, civil society organizations, academia, media practitioners, industry, developer community and the citizen.
- Serve as a concrete action plan of the fourth thematic area of the Open Government Partnership (technology and innovation) for the republic of Ghana.
- Promote transparency, accountability and efficiency in government through citizen feedback.

== Benefits ==
Ghana's decision to create an open data portal was informed by the fact the Open Government Data (OGD) programs around the world have demonstrated multiple benefits. GODI perceives that Ghana can gain all the benefit of open data which are grouped around three main themes:

=== Transparency and accountability ===
- Increased transparency of governments
- Greater accountability of officials by citizens being able to see and challenge individual spending and purchasing decisions
- Behaviour change due to the possibility of greater scrutiny
- Better understanding by civil society of the reasons for government decisions
- Better democracy and increased civic capital
- Better informed and balanced journalism; i.e. data journalism

=== Improved public services ===
- Increased number of services to people due to an increased base of potential service providers
- New synergies among government, public administration and civil society organizations
- Increased citizen participation and inclusion through extended offers of services closer to people's needs
- Closer cooperation between central and local government
- Increased internal government efficiency and effectiveness

=== Economic growth ===
- New business opportunities for services to businesses and citizens using government data
- Better functioning of the economy through easy access to core reference information held by the government
- Increased employment for application and service developers
- New innovative uses of OGD that can help spur innovation and development in the IT sector
