= Rugby union in Ghana =

Rugby union in Ghana, and its predecessor the Gold Coast is a minor but growing sport with a long history.

== Governing body ==
The Ghana Rugby Football Union is the governing body for the sport. The Current President of the Union is Gifty Annan Myers and has put a lot of effort into ensuring rugby has a strong framework in Ghana and is also responsible for Ghana's participation in Competitions.

== History ==
Rugby was first introduced into Ghana when it was a British colony, and many of the players were in the military. Like many minor African rugby nations, the sport is played in and around the capital, Accra, and for a number of years, the sport was dominated by white expatriates, working in oil, and aluminium

In June, 2009, Ghana hosted the first ever North West Africa women's Sevens.

There are also a small number of teams which have been established which include Cape coast RFC and the Accra Warriors which both involve the volunteers from Gap Year companies. Many players from these teams go on to play for the National Side who are making their mark on African Rugby.

== See also ==
- Ghana national rugby union team
- Confederation of African Rugby
- Africa Cup
- Ghana Rugby League
