= Ghana Internet Policy =

Ghana was one of the first countries to be connected to internet in Africa.

== History ==
Ghana became the next country to have internet in the Sub Sahara. Internet services began in Ghana in 1995. This was made possible through the collaborations between Network Computer Systems (NCS), Pipex International, The Ministry of Transport and Communication of Ghana, Ghana Telecom, and British Telecom. NCS had registered ghana.com domain in 1993.

== Wireless internet ==
Ghana has over 15 internet service providers who mostly provide different forms of internet services. Most of these Internet service providers (ISPs) provide wireless internet. And these include all the telcos in Ghana.

== Internet speed ==
According to bandwidthplace, Ghana's internet speed hovers around an average of 1.46 Mbit/s uploads across most of the internet enabled devices tested.

== Internet accessibility ==
There are over 7.9 million internet users in Ghana who mostly access the internet from mobile devices.

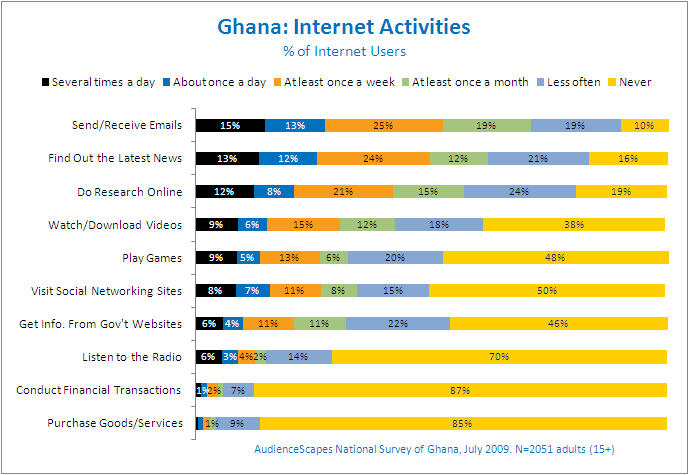
Ghana Internet Activities

== Internet service providers ==
There are a number of ISPs in Ghana, apart from the major telecommunication companies like MTN Ghana, Vodafone Ghana, Airtel Africa, Millicom and Globacom there are other companies like Africaonline, ADTech IT and Blue Cloud Network which also provide internet services. There is also Busyinternet and Surfline which offers wireless internet services through their omternet enabled devices. Internet closure during elections

== Net neutrality ==
As it stands now, Ghana does not have any provisions on net neutrality. This has raised concerns and brought together netizens and tech firms to protest for this provision in Ghana

Ghana has however faced a net neutrality crisis in the past. This was as a result of the NCA wanting to ban sites like Skype, WhatsApp, Viber and other internet based instant messaging platforms with the excuse that they were causing losses to telcos in Ghana. This campaign was led by telecommunication giant MTN which complained of losses due to people's continuous use of these platforms which reduced the number of calls. This brought a huge debate and in the end this never happened. NCA reacted to this that their press statement was taken out of context and the said ban was not going to happen anytime.

== Internet censorship ==
There are no government restrictions on access to the Internet or reports that the government monitors e-mail or Internet chat rooms without judicial oversight. Individuals and groups engage in the peaceful expression of views via the Internet, including by e-mail.

Although the constitution and law provide for freedom of speech and press, the government sometimes restricts those rights. The police arbitrarily arrest and detain journalists. Some journalists practice self-censorship. The constitution prohibits arbitrary interference with privacy, family, home, or correspondence, and the government respects these prohibitions in practice.

In 2002 the government of Ghana censored Internet media coverage of tribal violence in Northern Ghana.

=== Internet shutdown during elections ===
During the heat of the 2016 election year, there were rumors that the Inspector General of Ghana Police wanted to shut down access to internet. The civil society organizations came out to condemn the intended shutting down of the internet and proffered solutions like tracking of the internet.

The then President John Mahama came out to state that the internet wouldn't be shut down on the day of elections.

== Data centers ==
- National Information Technology Agency (NITA)

== Cyber Fraud ==
Cyber fraud has been a major issue in Ghana like most developing countries in the world. A Kenyan IT firm report that Ghana lost over $50 million due to cyber fraud, this was projected to increase to around $100 million in 2018. Several Ghanaians and foreigners have also been arrested for crimes relating to cyber fraud. One notable crime is sim box fraud. In 2017 the National Cyber Security Week was held in Ghana to bring stakeholders together to help address issues of cyber security and cyber fraud.

== Internet laws in Ghana ==
The laws governing internet in Ghana include

=== Electronic Communication Amendment Act ===
This Law addresses some technical, regulatory and financial challenges related to interconnection.

=== Data Protection Act ===
The Data Protection Act, 2012 (Act 843) was formulated to protect personal information. This legislation was enacted by the Parliament of the Republic of Ghana to protect the privacy and personal data of individuals. It regulates the process personal information is acquired, kept, used or disclosed by data controllers and data processors by requiring compliance with certain data protection principles.
