= Ghanaian literature =

Ghanaian literature is literature produced by authors from Ghana or in the Ghanaian diaspora. It starts with a long oral tradition, was influenced heavily by western literature during colonial rule, and became prominent with a post-colonial nationalist tradition in the mid-20th century. The current literary community continues with a diverse network of voices both within and outside the country, including in film, theatre, and modern digital formats such as blogging.

The most prominent authors are novelists J. E. Casely Hayford, Ayi Kwei Armah, and Nii Ayikwei Parkes, who gained international acclaim with the books Ethiopia Unbound (1911), The Beautyful Ones Are Not Yet Born (1968) and Tail of the Blue Bird (2009), respectively. In addition to novels, other literary arts and genres such as theatre and poetry have also had a very good development and support at the national level with prominent playwrights, poets and historians Joe de Graft and Efua Sutherland.

The Ghanaian national literature radio programme and accompanying publication Voices of Ghana (1955–1957) was one of the earliest on the African continent, and helped establish the scope of the contemporary literary tradition in Ghana. Scholarship of Anglophone Africa sometimes favours literatures from other geographies, such as the literature of Nigeria.

== See also ==
- List of Ghanaian writers
- Music of Ghana
- Cinema of Ghana
- List of libraries in Ghana
