= List of newspapers in Ghana =

This is a list of newspapers in Ghana. In 2007, there were 136 newspapers. Not all papers currently have a website.

== List of newspapers ==
Newspaper	Location	First issued	Publisher	Website	Notes
Accra Daily Mail					private
The Accra Times					private
All Ghana News					private/national
Business and Financial Times					private and four times weekly
Business Guide					private weekly owned by the Daily Guide
Christian Messenger					private monthly owned by the Presbyterian Church of Ghana
Daily Democrat					private
Daily Ghana					private
Daily Graphic					state-owned; along with the Mirror, the most widely read newspaper in Ghana
Daily Guide					private
The Daily Searchlight					private
The Statesman Newspaper					private
The Dispatch					private
The Entrepreneur Newspaper					private, bi-monthly
Accra Evening News - Wikipedia					state-owned
The Finder Newspaper					news from Ghana and Africa, politics, entertainment, world, health, business and sports
Today Newspaper	North Ridge, Accra	2007	Ghana Sports Publications Limited		private
Free Press					private
The Gazette Newspaper					weekly newspaper
Ghana Palaver					private
The Ghanaian Chronicle	Accra	1996			privately owned daily
The Ghanaian Lens					private
Ghanaian Times					state-owned daily
Ghanaian Voice					private liberal weekly
Green Dove					private bimonthly
Guide Young Blazers					privately owned by the Daily Guide; weekly
The Guide					private weekly
Heritage					private
The Independent					independent conservative weekly
The Insight					
Junior Graphic					state-owned, sister paper of the Daily Graphic, aimed at 11- to 22-year-olds
The Mirror					weekly, sister paper of the Daily Graphic
Network Herald	Accra		NBS Multimedia		private
News One Newspaper					privately owned by the Daily Guide; weekly
The Ghanaian Observer					
90 Minutes Newspaper					privately owned by Arcadia Publication; three times a week
People & Places (P&P)					private
The Public Agenda	Accra-North		P.A. Communications		private
The Punch					private
The Pioneer					independent semi-weekly
Catholic Standard					weekly, privately owned
The Christian Scoop Newspaper	South La Estate, Accra	2015	Ropheka Media House		weekly, privately owned
The Searchlight					private
The Statesman	Accra		Kinesic Communications		independent private weekly; organ of the New Patriotic Party
Sunday Herald					weekly
The Timeline Newspaper					Ghana and Africa's first opportunities newspaper
News Ghana					independent
Vibe Ghana					independent
Chale News					independent
Weekly Express					private weekly
GhanaStar					(formerly operated by World News Network, currently Private)
Republik City News			SuccessValley		( Operated by SuccessValley, currently Private)
Weekly Insight					private
Weekly Spectator					state-owned
Graphic Showbiz					state-owned, sister paper of the Daily Graphic, targeting entertainment stories
ModernGhana		2005	Modern Ghana Media Communication Limited	ModernGhana.com	private.
The Ghana News Agency (GNA)		1957			state-owned
Ghana Palaver					private

== See also ==
- Media of Ghana
- List of radio stations in Ghana
- Telecommunications in Ghana
- New media in Ghana
