= Ghanaian Times =

Newspaper in Ghana

- Type: Daily newspaper
- Owner: The New Times Corporation
- Founded: 1957
- Language: English
- Headquarters: Accra, Ghana
- Circulation: 80,000 (as of 2009)
- Website: www.ghanaiantimes.com.gh

The Ghanaian Times is a state-owned daily newspaper published in Accra, Ghana. The newspaper was established in 1957. It has a circulation of 80,000 copies and is published six times per week.

== History ==
The newspaper was formerly known as the Guinea Press Limited. It was established by the first President of Ghana, the late President Dr. Kwame Nkrumah in 1957, as a printing press for The Convention People's Party. After his overthrow in military coup in 1966, The Guinea Press was taken over as a state property by the National Liberation Council Decree 130 of 1968. By an instrument of Incorporation-Act 363, 1971, Guinea Press was changed to the New Times Corporation. The Act also repealed the National Newspapers (Guinea Press Limited – Interim Reconstitution Decree) which acquired it as state property. That Act was given further recognition by the provision of Provisional National Defence Council Law 42.
