= ModernGhana =

Ghana-focused news, opinions & infotainment website

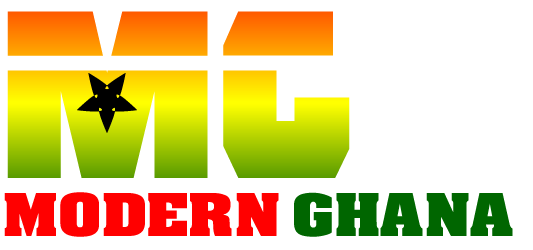
- Website type: General news and information
- Available in: English
- Owners: Roger Agambire Agana (80 percent); Andrew Young Bawa (10 percent); Niibi Sowah (10 percent)
- Founder: Bright Owusu Adamson
- Website: modernghana.com
- Launched: August 3, 2005; 21 years ago
- Current status: Online

ModernGhana is a Ghanaian online media portal that has been in operation since 2005. The site covers news, politics, business, sports, entertainment and opinions. It is owned by Modern Ghana Media Communication Ltd., a privately owned Ghanaian company.

== History ==
Modernghana.com was officially launched on August 3, 2005 in Amsterdam by Bright Owusu Adamson, a young Ghanaian who saw the need to bring news closer to Ghanaians in the diaspora. It initially started as a news aggregator and later evolved to a producer of original content. The news platform is also the first ever Ghanaian website that aggregated all Ghanaian local radio stations online.

The site started innovations that became the standard for upcoming Ghanaian news websites. It has evolved over the years to include video content (ModernGhana TV) that covers a wide range of topics including interviews with the news makers, public and private organizations, business enterprises, topical political issues, personalities in the entertainment and lifestyle industry and voice pops on both social and national issues of News values.

== Legal cases ==
ModernGhana editor Emmanuel Ajarfor Abugri was arrested together with Emmanuel Britwum, a reporter, by Ghana's National Security operatives on Thursday June 27, 2019 in what was described as a secret operation. The news outlet's offices were raided during the arrest and working equipment including laptops, mobile phones and a tablet were seized. They arrested were detained for days and interrogated on an opinion piece the website published that was authored by one Constance Kwabeng about the National Security Minister Albert Kan-Dapaah.

The National Security Secretariat accused the arrested staff of ModernGhana of Cybercrime but Mr. Abugri on his release said he was physically assaulted and his privacy violated by the forceful seizure of some of his electronic gadgets. Passwords to his personal gadgets were forcefully taken from him by the National Security personnel and accessed without his consent. Ajarfor and his reporter were put before court but the State subsequently withdrew the charges proffered against them.

Emmanuel Ajarfor later sued the National Security Coordinator, Joshua Kyeremeh; the Inspector General of Police, David Asante-Apeatu; and the Attorney General, Gloria Akuffo for violating his Human rights. Ajarfor's lawyers sought him damages. To date, Ajarfor's two cellphones, tablet and laptop are still with the National Security. As at March 2021 the case was still in court.
