= Mass media in Ghana =

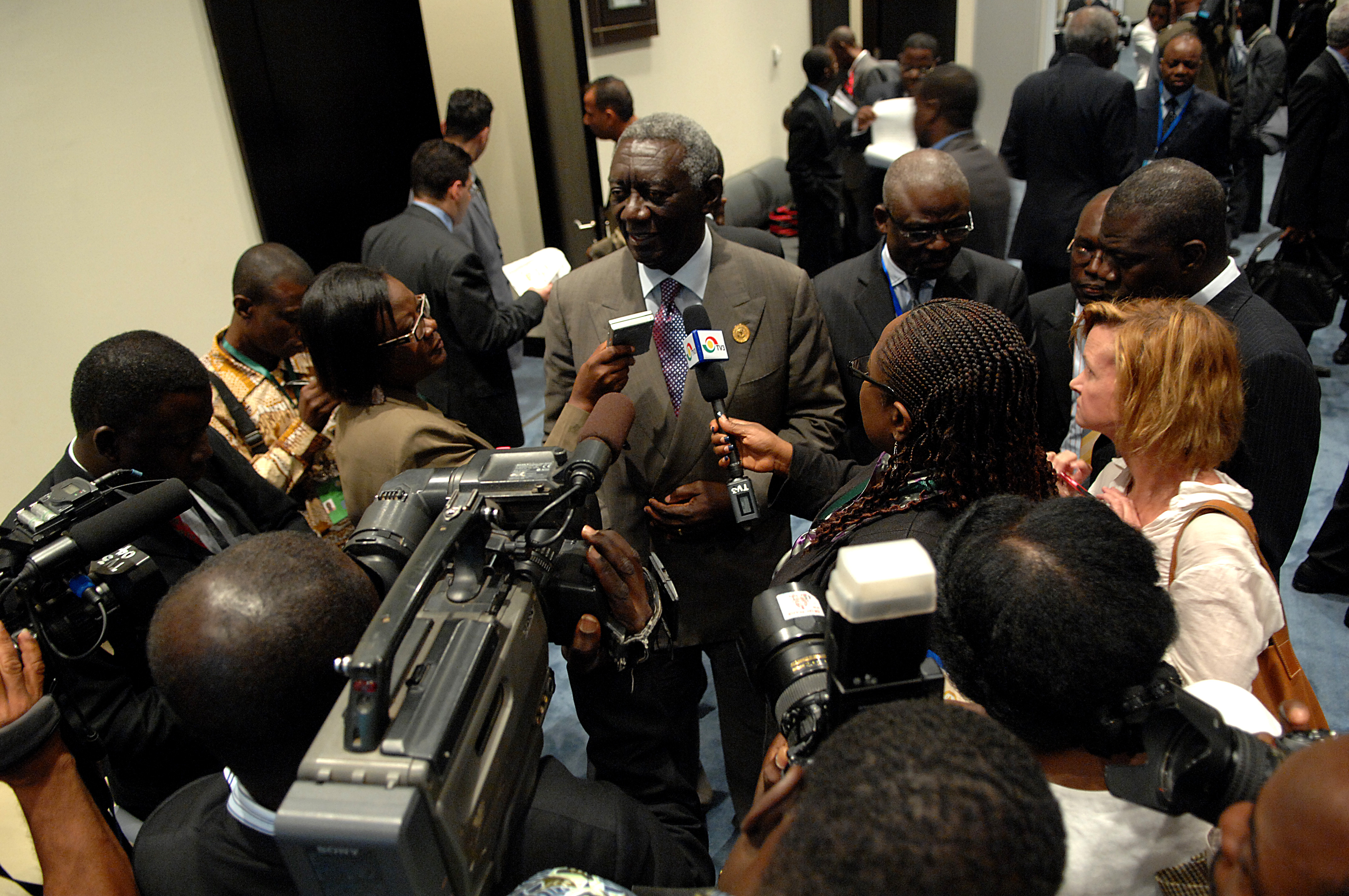
The 2nd President of the 4th Republic of Ghana, John Agyekum Kufuor speaks with the press.

The mass media in Ghana, includes television, radio, internet publishing and newspapers.

== History ==
=== 19th century ===
The media in the Gold Coast first emerged in the 19th century with the publication of The Gold Coast Gazette and Commercial Intelligencer in 1822. The paper had several functions: to provide information for civil servants and European merchants, and to help promote literacy rates and rural development among the local population - while encouraging unity with the Gold Coast government. In the mid-19th century, a diverse number of African-owned papers appeared that were largely unrestricted by the colonial government. This led to a surge of independent press, which in part led to the independence of Ghana.

Colonial Governor Sir Arnold Hodson introduced the first radio channel, named Radio ZOY, on 31 July 1935, before it was renamed to the Ghana Broadcasting Corporation upon the country's independence in 1957. Its main use was to spread propaganda to gain the support of the colonies

=== Post-independence ===
Following the 6 March 1957 declaration of independence by Ghana from the United Kingdom, there were only around four newspapers. Leader Kwame Nkrumah eventually controlled all the press in Ghana and saw it as an instrument of state authority, providing propaganda that encouraged national unity and creating a hierarchal system of state apparatus to manage the media. Transfer of the media had changed hands from a civilian to a military government, and a series of arrests and imprisonment of political opponents by Nkrumah had a chilling effect on the media. The opposition Ashanti Pioneer, which had operated since the 1930s, was shut down by Nkrumah after being subject to censorship. After Nkrumah's overthrow in a coup, many state outlets changed hands, though still under the control of the ruling party. The National Liberation Council (NLC) imposed stricter controls on domestic private outlets; for example, the Rumours Decree in 1966 prevented anyone from suing government-owned newspapers.

In 1969, the democratically elected civilian government of Kofi Busia that followed the NLC were left with a large number of media outlets under state control. Busia repealed various acts and dismissed the owner of the state-owned Daily Graphic for opposing Busia, who had appealed for African dialogue with the apartheid government in South Africa. However, when Ignatius Kutu Acheampong overthrew the Busia government, he reinstated strict media control and clamped down on opposition outlets by cutting off foreign exchange. However, a number of opposition media remained unimpeded during the Acheampong regime, and by 1978 had grown in their calls for a multi-party democracy in Ghana.

The regime of Acheampong was overthrown in May 1978 by General Akuffo, who reversed some of his predecessors media policies and released jailed journalists and opposition members. This led to the establishment of two party papers: the Star of the Popular Front Party (PFP) and the Gong Gong of the People's National Party (PNP). The Akuffo regime was short lived, ending in another coup d'état by the Armed Forces Revolutionary Council (AFRC) headed by Jerry Rawlings, who repealed the press laws that were passed by Acheampong. Rawlings replaced the chief editor of the Daily Graphic who criticised the AFRC executions, though they had no authority to do so as it undermined the Constitution of the Third Republic, which stated they had to be replaced by the Press Commission. After eight months of the AFRC regime, which had promised media reform but in the end did not materialise, power was returned to the democratically elected PNP with Hilla Limann on 24 September 1979. Limann was an advocate of liberal media reform, establishing a 12-member Press Commission on 25 July 1980. In a speech he said:

I shall, as elected President of Ghana, be forever prepared to submit to the acid test of public judgement the claims of those who may think that they represent the public more than me or any other political leader. Bluff, snobbery and arrogance on all sides must now cease, so that the Press Commission can function in a way that it has been envisaged by those who have never had any personal axe to grind. I have long been one of the protagonists myself. Since the functions of the Press Commission have clearly been spelt out in the Constitution, I can do no more than reassure its members and our journalists that my government will respect, uphold and defend the Constitution and thus do everything in our power to help the Press Commission discharge its obligation, in the overall interest of the public to which we are all to varying degrees accountable.

The Press Commission, as enshrined in law, were to investigate complaints about the press, uphold press freedom and provide necessary regulation and licensing to media outlets. During Limann's rule, he respected the new Constitution and accepted criticism from the media. This did not last long however, as John Rawlings, citing "corruption and maladministration", once again seized power under the Provisional National Defence Council on 31 December 1981, and repealed the liberal media reforms instigated by Limann. Under the new government, the Third Constitution, along with the Press Commission, was abolished. Through the state-owned Daily Graphic on 5 January 1982, he told the press to lead the "Holy War" and direct the revolution. Rawlings passed laws that prevented criticism of the government or its policies, dismissed editors critical of him and passed various laws such as the Preventive Custody Law and Newspaper Licensing Law which allowed indefinite detention without trial of journalists, and stifled private media development respectively. The PNDC Secretary of Information Joyce Aryee in 1983 defended direct government control:

I don't see the press as lying outside the political institutions that we already have. This is where I feel people ought to realise that the press differs from country to country. In a situation like ours, where we need to conscientize people, and where we have an illiteracy problem, you use institutions like the press to do the conscientization.

The policies not only affected print media but also the Ghana Broadcasting Corporation, with several dismissals or premature retirement. As a result, some media avoided all discussions of politics altogether and focused on other topics like sport or entertainment instead.

=== 1992-2000 ===
In 1992, Ghana promulgated a new constitution, and returned to democratic rule on 7 January 1993. Rawlings as part of the National Democratic Congress (he retired a Flight Lieutenant of the Ghana Armed Forces) liberalised the media by repealing previous laws the PNDC signed in. The private media, which had previously been silenced under the regime for the past decade, used the new press freedom laws to voice criticism at Rawlings of the years of strict laws and published several accusations of violent authoritarianism and drug abuse. The state media however, maintained a favourable image of Rawlings. Rawlings acknowledged the years of media repression, though he defended the military coup:

All that has happened during the last decade cannot be divorced from today's constitutional order. No one can fail to appreciate the significance of the 31st December Revolution in bringing Ghanaians to the threshold of the Fourth Republic, and in establishing firm principles of social justice which will make the constitution a living reality - to do so would mean distorting Ghana's history and putting aside those vital lessons which would indeed enrich this phase of Ghanaian experience.

Furthermore, Rawlings had pledged to uphold Chapter 12 of the Constitution of Ghana, promoting press freedom, responsibility of both private and state outlets and these freedoms to be additional to human rights. A new 15-member National Press Commission (later Ghanaian Media Commission) was created that was independent of government, which would uphold the aforementioned responsibilities. Despite these new reforms, President Rawlings and the NDC government remained critical of the private press, calling it "politically irresponsible" and motivated by profit. One government official claimed the private media "tested the limits of the government", while others accused it of portraying Parliament as inferior. A group named Friends of Democracy claimed it had 1,000 signatories protesting against the private media. Editors from the Free Press and New Statesman had reported being sent death threats from the NDC for criticising the regime. Valerie Sackey who was an assistant to President Rawlings, noted that the private press had a duty to provide legitimate criticism of the government and to act responsibly, rather than simply portraying that the government was attempting to muzzle them.

=== 2000-present ===
After the election in 2000 of John Kufuor the tensions between the private media and government decreased. Kufuor was a supporter of press freedom and repealed the criminal libel law, though maintained that the media had to act responsibly. The Ghanaian media has been described as "one of the most unfettered" in Africa, operating with little restriction on private media. The private press often carries criticism of government policy. The media, and broadcast media in particular, were vigorous in their coverage of the 2008 Ghanaian presidential election, and the Ghanaian Journalists Association (GJA) praised John Atta Mills on his election, hoping to foster a good media-government relationship. During a 1999 interview, the GJA described how the media has helped promote democracy in the country:

The press has forced the Government to accept that officials are accountable....It is for me a positive indication that the media of Ghana have made some impact on democracy since the foundation of the 4th Republic

— Seyd, C., 4 June 1999.

Due to the new freedom of media, the video game industry in Ghana is growing.

== Relations with foreign media ==
The Ghanaian media holds good relations with foreign media, with many international journalists from Western, African and Asian organisations based in the capital, Accra. Journalists are not hindered during their work, and information is not censored into or out of the country. The main news agency, Ghana News Agency, was set up in 1957 by Nkrumah to provide balanced information on local and international news. Reuters helped provide the agency with guidance and technical assistance until 1961. The agency had subscriptions from over 140 organisations and six news agencies in 2000.

== Challenges to Ghanaian media ==
Despite its relative freedom, the media in Ghana does face some challenges. Journalists in Ghana are often poorly paid, under resourced, and often lack training. As a result, journalists in Ghana find themselves susceptible to bribery and self-censorship. The quality of radio and television broadcast media programming is low. With respect to newspapers, the ownership landscape of newspapers is politically polarized with most newspapers supporting either the government or opposition party lines. Only one newspaper, the state-owned Daily Graphic is truly national in distribution.

=== Freedom of the press ===
Although the constitution and law provide for freedom of speech and press, the government sometimes restricts those rights. The police arbitrarily arrest and detain journalists. Some journalists practice self-censorship. The constitution prohibits arbitrary interference with privacy, family, home, or correspondence, and the government respects these prohibitions in practice.

In 2002 the government of Ghana censored Internet media coverage of tribal violence in Northern Ghana.

== Newspapers ==
| Newspaper | Circulation (Copies) |
|---|---|
| Daily Graphic | 100000 |
| Ghanaian Times | 80000 |
| Chronicle | 45000 |
| Daily Guide | 22000 |
| Daily Democrat | 5000 |
| Daily Dispatch | 5000 |
| New Crusading Guide | 5000 |
| Daily Post | 5000 |
| Daily Searchlight | 1500 |

Around 135 newspapers are published in Ghana, including 16 independent newspapers and 9 daily newspapers. The contribution of a large number of state and private newspapers create a diverse media environment in Ghana. State papers such as the Daily Graphic and Ghanaian Times tend to promote and encourage support for government policies and follow a conservative line, unlike private press which has exposed lavish styles of government officials and mis-management of government affairs.

The Ghanaian National Media Commission, an independent commission, was set up to monitor and receive complaints about the media. The commission had received 50 complaints in 2002, and in May 2001, forced the Ghanaian Chronicle to apologise for publishing "false stories" on individuals without substantial evidence. However, similar rulings have been ignored due to a lack of authority. Today News Ghana and Modern Ghana are the most popular Newspapers.

== Television and radio ==
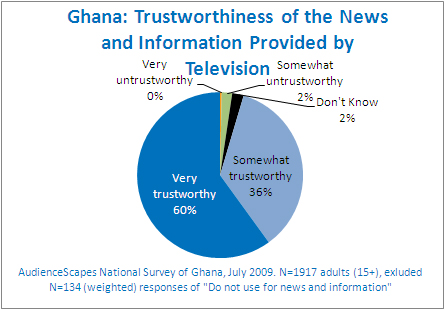
Ghana mass media, news and information provided by television.

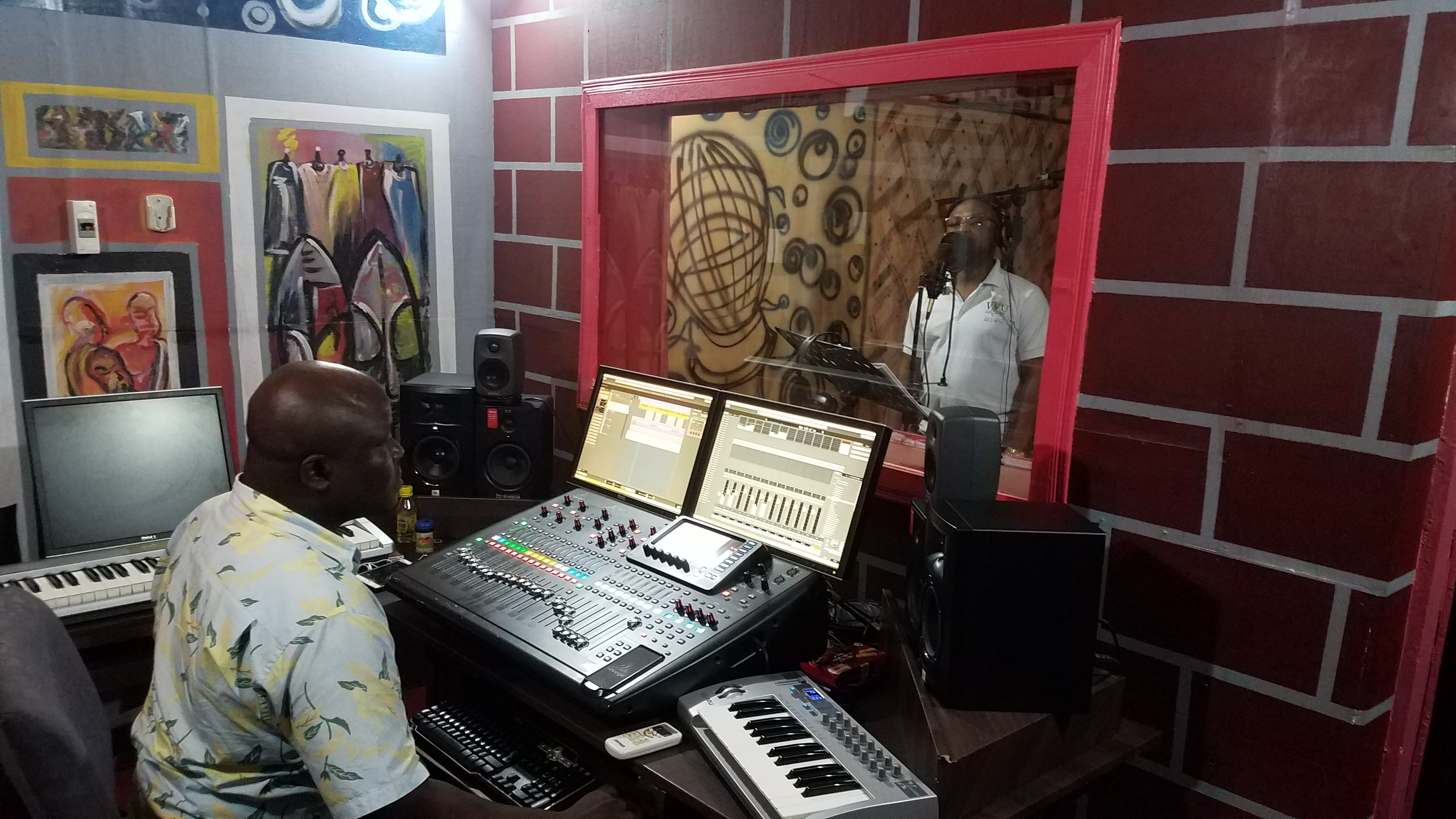
Radio studio in Ghana

Television was introduced to Ghana in 1965 and was under State control. The Ghana Broadcasting Corporation held a monopoly on television broadcasting until 1994, following the 1992 constitution of the new democratically elected government. Part of the 1992 constitution established the National Media Commission which held the responsibility to promote and ensure the independence of the media.

Ghana's heat and humidity made early television broadcasting difficult. All but two of 200 televisions installed for an educational project were not functional within two years.

Shortly after the 1966 coup of Nkrumah by the National Liberation Council (who held an even tighter State grip on the nation's media), the Ghana Broadcasting Corporation announced a decree to, "broadcast programmes in the field of culture, education, information and entertainment, to reflect national progress and aspirations, and to broadcast in the main Ghanaian languages and in English". The network began by producing 80% of its own shows, but could not afford to continue doing so with the TV license revenue. When advertising began, the network had to show popular imported programs such as television westerns. By the early 1970s only 40% of Ghanaian television was domestic production.

There were seven broadcast stations in 2007. Among the stations, there is the state-run Ghana Broadcasting Corporation and five private channels, TV3, Metro TV, Viasat 1, TV Skyy, and TV Africa, with TV3 and Metro TV going on the air in 1997. Foreign stations such as CNN and BBC are freely accessible.

FM radio began in 1988, which allowed foreign radio stations into the country, such as Voice of America, Radio France Internationale and BBC broadcasts on 101.3 FM. A public demonstration in 1995 over seizure of equipment from a private station, Radio EYE, forced the government to issue many FM frequencies for other private stations, creating a new era of "broadcast pluralism". Interactive phone-in discussions on local and national issues are very popular on Ghanaian radio. In addition to English-language stations, there are several in local dialect. In 2007, 86 FM and three shortwave stations existed.

== Internet ==
The Internet was used by an estimated 4.2 million Ghanaians in 2012, roughly 17% of the population. There was no significant improvement in 2014 as reported by Internet World Statistics there were "5,171,993 Internet users on Dec 31, 2014, 19.6% of the population, per IWS." . As it stands, there are so many possibilities of reaching more people in the Ghanaian Digital News Space. It is unrestricted by the government.

== See also ==
- Telecommunications in Ghana
- Telephone numbers in Ghana
- New media in Ghana
- Ghanaian literature
- News Ghana

== Bibliography ==
- Kwame S. T. Boafo (1987). "Democratizing Media Systems in African Societies: The Case of Ghana". Africa Media Review. 2 (1). Archived from the original on 21 November 2020 – via Michigan State University Libraries, African e-Journals Project.
- Isaac Obeng-Quaidoo, Isaac (1988). "Socio-Economic Factors Affecting Journalistic Expression in Africa: The Case of Ghana". Africa Media Review. 2 (2). Archived from the original on 21 November 2020 – via Michigan State University Libraries, African e-Journals Project.
- "Ghana: Directory: Broadcasting and Communications". Africa South of the Sahara 2004. Regional Surveys of the World. Europa Publications. 2004. p. 497. ISBN 1857431839.
- Jonathon Green; Nicholas J. Karolides (2005). "Ghana". Encyclopedia of Censorship. Facts on File, Inc. ISBN 978-1-4381-1001-1.
- "Ghana", Freedom of the Press, USA: Freedom House, 2016, OCLC 57509361
