= Telecommunications in Ghana =

- Ghana

Ghana communications topics
- Economy; Energy; Ghana Internet Exchange; Media; New media; Radio stations; Telecommunications; Transportation

Statistics
- Land lines: 285,000 (2012)
- Mobile cellular lines: 25.6 million (2012)
- Internet users: 4.2 million (2012)

Telecommunications in Ghana include radio, television, fixed and mobile telephones, and the Internet.

Telecommunications is the main economic sector of Ghana according to the statistics of the World Bank due to the Ghana liberal policy around Information and communications technology (ICT). Among the main sectors of investments, 65% is for ICT, 8% for communications and 27% is divided for public administration.

== Freedom of the press ==
After the overthrow of the elected government by Jerry Rawlings in December 1981 the Provisional National Defence Council repealed the liberal media reforms of previous governments, abolished the Third Constitution and the Press Commission, and passed laws that prevented criticism of the government or its policies, dismissed editors critical of Rawlings or the provisional council, the Preventive Custody and Newspaper Licensing Law which allowed indefinite detention of journalists without trial, and the Newspaper Licensing Law which stifled private media development. Ghanaian press freedom was restored with the promulgation of a new constitution in 1992, presidential and parliamentary elections in November and December 1992, and a return to multiparty democratic rule on 7 January 1993.

The mass media of Ghana is "among the most liberal in Africa", with Ghana ranking as the third freest in Africa and 30th in the world on the 2013 World Press Freedom Index from Reporters Without Borders. Article 21 of the Constitution of Ghana guarantees freedom of the press and other media, freedom of speech and expression, thought, and information.

== Internet ==
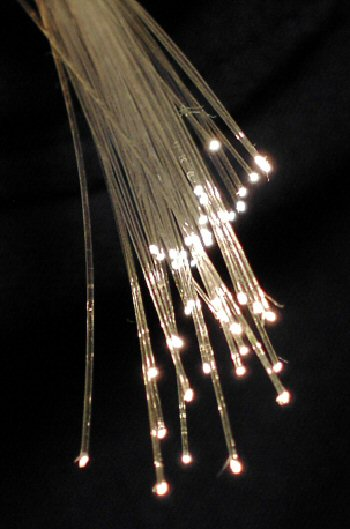
Fiber optics, used for high-speed Internet access and telecommunications.

The top-level domain of Ghana is .gh.

Ghana was one of the first countries in Africa to connect to the Internet. With an average household download speed of 5.8 Mbit/s Ghana had the third fastest speed on the African continent and the 110th fastest out of 188 countries worldwide in February 2014.

In 2009 the number of Internet users stood at 1.3 million, 93rd in the world. In 2012 the number of Internet users reached 4.2 million (69th in the world) or 17.1% of the population (149th in the world).

In 2012 there were 62,124 fixed (109th in the world; 0.3% of the population, 156th in the world) and 8.2 million wireless (27th in the world; 33.3% of the population, 49th in the world) broadband subscriptions.

In 2012 there were 59,086 Internet hosts operating in Ghana, 93rd in the world, and Ghana had been allocated 332,544 IPv4 addresses, 102nd in the world, with less than 0.05% of the world total, and 13.2 addresses per 1000 people.

In 2010 there were 165 authorised Internet service providers of which 30 were operating.

=== Internet censorship and surveillance ===
There are no government restrictions on access to the Internet or reports that the government monitors e-mail or Internet chat rooms without judicial oversight. Individuals and groups engage in the peaceful expression of views via the Internet, including by e-mail.

While the constitution and law provide for freedom of speech and press, the government sometimes restricts those rights. The police arbitrarily arrest and detain journalists. Some journalists practice self-censorship. The constitution prohibits arbitrary interference with privacy, family, home, or correspondence, and the government respects these prohibitions in practice.

In 2002 the government of Ghana censored Internet media coverage of tribal violence in Northern Ghana.

== Radio and television ==
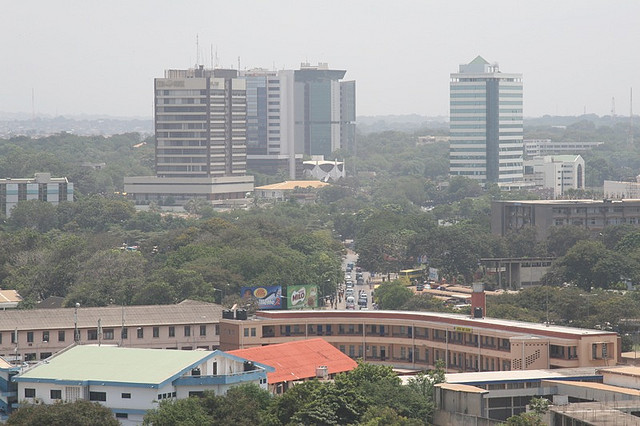
Mass communications and Mass media corporate headquarters.

In 2007 Ghana was served by one state-owned TV station, two state-owned radio networks; privately owned TV stations and a number of privately owned radio stations. International broadcasters and cable and satellite TV subscription services were available. In 2010, there were 140 authorised radio stations with 84 in operation and 32 authorised television stations with approximately 26 in operation. Television broadcasters include First Digital TV (ATV, BTA, FAITH TV, CHANNEL D, STAR TV, FTV, SPORTS 24, CINIMAX, PLANET KIDZ) TV Africa, Metro TV, TV3, GTV, GH One TV and Viasat 1.

The Ghana Broadcasting Corporation (GBC) founded by decree in 1968 is the state agency that provides civilian radio and television services. It was created for the development of the education and entertainment sectors and to enhance the knowledge of the people of Ghana.

The television industry has increased over this period in the country. There have been a lot of television stations established within the country and whether we like it or not, it has shaped the societies in many ways. The Top 5 TV stations in Ghana according to Green Views Residential Projects are GTV (Ghana Television), Citi TV, UTV (United Television), TV3, and GH One TV(Ghana One Television).

== Telephones ==
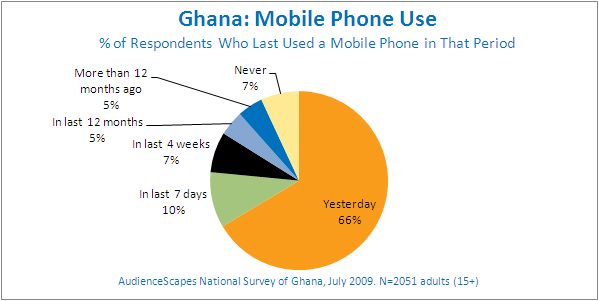
Ghana mobile phone and smart phone use, July 2009.

The prefix code of Ghana for international calls is +233.

As of 2012 there were 285,000 fixed telephone lines in use, 120th in the world, and 25.6 million mobile cellular lines, 42nd in the world.

The telephone system has a fixed-line infrastructure concentrated in Accra and some wireless local loop installed, domestic trunks primarily use microwave radio relay. There are 4 Intelsat (Atlantic Ocean) satellite earth stations. Microwave radio relay links Ghana to its neighbours (2009).

The SAT-3/WASC, Main One, GLO-1, and ACE international optical fibre submarine cables provide links to countries along the west coast of Africa and on to Europe and Asia.

In 2010 two fixed line and six mobile phone companies were authorised to operate in Ghana of which 5 were operating, 13 satellite providers were authorised of which 8 were operating, 176 VSAT providers were authorised of which 57 were operating, and 99 public and private network operators were authorised of which 25 were operating. Authorized telecommunications companies include Mobile Telecommunications Networks (MTN), Vodafone Ghana which purchased Telecom Ghana, Tigo which replaced Mobitel (Millicom International Cellular), Bharti Airtel and Zain which acquired Western Telesystems Ltd (Westel), Glo Mobile Ghana Limited, and Expresso Telecom which acquired Kasapa Telecom. In 2017, Tigo Ghana and Airtel Ghana merged to form AirtelTigo.

Competition among mobile-cellular providers has spurred growth, with a mobile phone teledensity in 2009 of more than 80 per 100 persons and rising. The cost of mobile phones is increased by taxes of around 38%.

The Ghana's telecom market has undergone several changes in recent years, following the privatisation of the incumbent telco Ghana Telecom and its rebranding as Vodafone Ghana. Two of the key players merged to form AirtelTigo in 2017, though in mid-2020 the parent companies of the operator decided to exit the market. The sale and transfer of AirtelTigo to the state was completed in November 2021.

According to the Ghana Telecom Services Market Reports, the telecom services market size in Ghana was valued at $1.9 billion in 2022. The market is expected to grow at a CAGR of 3.1% during the forecast period, 2022–2027. Initiatives such as Rural Telephony and Digital Inclusion Projects and Smart City Project will be driving the telecom sector in the country. The reports shows the leading telecom Companies in Ghana; MTN Ghana, Vodafone Ghana, AirtelTigo Ghana and Glo Ghana.

In 2023, MTN Ghana announced it would invest $1 billion into its network.

Efforts by regulatory bodies like the Bank of Ghana focus on expanding informal micro-insurance through consumer mobile money histories.

== Covid-19 impact ==
COVID-19 pandemic had a negligible impact on the Ghana telecom industry that brought about change in the industry. In March 2020, business hours broadband consumption has increased, as the country adjusted to life with COVID-19. The telecom sector witnessed growth in weekday viewership, movie rentals and purchases. Live viewing is increased by 15% and free video-on-demand is increased by 25% during the week as more people were in lock-down staying at home.

Ghana Telecom Market has witnessed strong growth in recent years and is expected to have continued growth over the forecast period to 2025. The growth in the industry is mainly due to increasing urban population with rising adoption of the mobile phones that supports 3G, 4G and 5G services across the country. Telecom sector is further expected to have strong growth over the forecast period with rising adoption of Internet of Things (IoT) in the sector that connects with wired and wireless broadband.

== See also ==
- Ghana Internet Exchange (GIX)
- New media in Ghana
- Media in Ghana
- Internet in Ghana
- Africa Digital Awards
