= New media in Ghana =

Communications topics of Ghana

The use of new media in Ghana like elsewhere is growing. The Information and Communications Technologies (ICT) sector, which is based on a free market approach, has promoted new media use. Most popular aspects of new media to Ghanaians is the Internet, and its associated mobile and desktop applications for education, health, politics, business, publishing, governance and so on. Also popular is the use of mobile devices like smartphones and tablets and computers.

== History of internet ==
Ghana was among the first countries in Sub-Saharan Africa to have Internet access. As of December 2012, about 4.2 million people or roughly 17% of the population used the Internet. Wireless technologies represent a significant area for expanding telecommunications access.

The Bharti Airtel, Huawei and Microsoft are involved in efforts to improve Ghana's telecommunications network. And these wireless technologies, though efficient and wide-reaching, come at an expense to the ordinary Internet user, even if in rural areas.

== Governance and democracy ==
Ghanaian entrepreneurs, such as the founders of Multimedia Group Limited, have liberalized communication in the country, where previously a "culture of silence" discouraged individuals from expressing opinions contrary to those of the ruling government.

== Ghana social media rankings ==
In 2014, Avance Media released a list of Ghanaian personalities and brands according to their presence on social media. The rankings was in turn to create competition among brands to accept social media as a great tool for development. Categories included; Radio, TV, Telecoms, etc. including overall Ghanaians on Social Media

== New media use ==
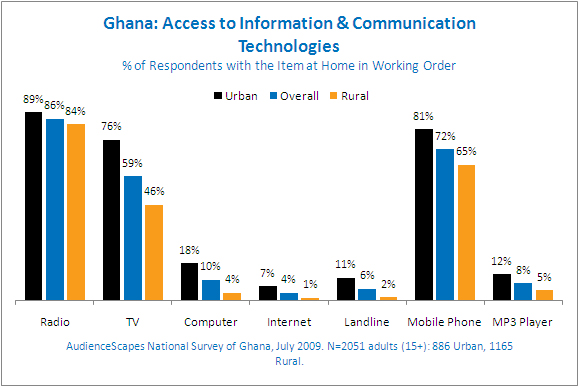
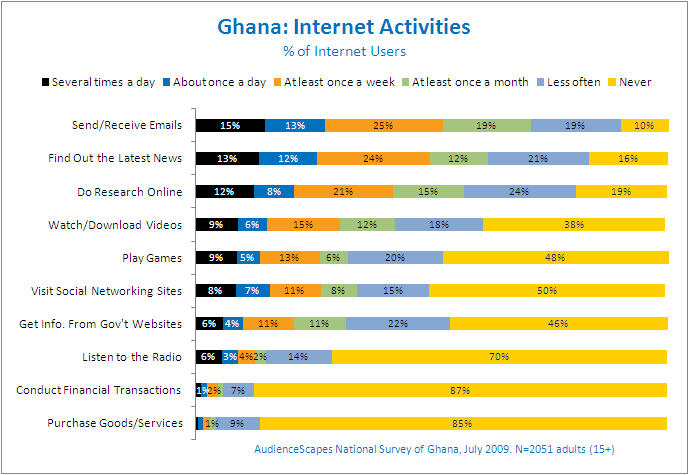
Ghana access to information and communition technologies, and Ghana internet surfing activities.

Ghanaian state digital technology and communications technologies corporation Rlg Communications manufactures, exports and provides tablet computers, smart phones among a host of digital electronics for individuals in Ghana and countries throughout the Africa continent and New Media in Ghana has implemented relative liberal policies towards the Internet, new communications technologies, and New Media use is rapidly rising in Ghana. New Media content creation, publishing, digital distribution and consumption via Internet-enabled digital devices (digital electronics) have increased. In 2002, Ghana's ICT Development Committee created a forward-thinking Information and communications technology (ICT) strategy (Information and communication technologies for development) called the Information and Communications Technology For Accelerated Development project (ICT4AD). The strategy consisted of a three-phase approach: first, the committee members came up with a framework for what they would like to achieve; next, they developed a set of policies that would help them reach that goal and finally, they delineated exactly how those policies could be implemented.

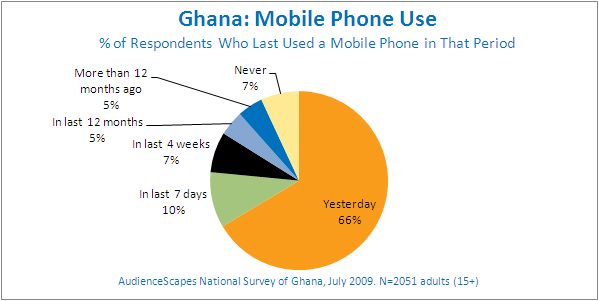
Ghana mobile phone and smart phone use activity

After the completion of all three phases, they took their findings to the Cabinet and Parliament of Ghana in 2003. The recommendations were subsequently approved, which cleared the way for the government to implement several e-learning, e-government and national-based IT initiatives in 2012; the Ghana Open Data Initiative and National Information Technology Agency (NITA) in 2008, as well as a national ICT infrastructure roll-out. This good planning has had a positive effect on the development of ICT-based business and general high ICT usage in Ghana: 2002 – 2005 saw a nearly nine-fold increase in the usage of mobile phones and personal computers, as well as the birth of an Information technology (IT) industry (including call-centers and some computer manufacturing) and industrial technology.

In November 2011, Ghanaian business incubators and entrepreneurs David Osei, Kamil Nabong and Philips Effah, founded Dropifi, an application software that helps businesses sort customer feedback on the Internet. About 20 months later in July 2013, Dropifi application software company has become the first African company to join the 500 Startups program, a Silicon Valley–based seed accelerator and investment fund. Dropifi started at the Meltwater Entrepreneurial School of Technology in Accra (Meltwater Group). Dropifi application software helps business monitor customer feedback and it analyzes demographics, industry trends and the emotions behind the messages, to help companies respond effectively to customers. It also taps into social media platforms so companies can have a broader customer reach. Dropifi application software company in July 2013 had over 6,000 clients in more than 30 countries worldwide and is currently focused on technology international market.

== See also ==
- Ghana Internet Exchange
- Internet censorship and surveillance in Ghana
- Media of Ghana
- Telecommunications in Ghana
