= List of marathon races in Africa =

The following is a list of marathon races in Africa.

== Legend ==
Symbol/Column	Description
**Bold**	Bold faced races are included in the World Marathon Majors
	Platinum
	Gold
	Elite
	Label
(year)	Defunct

== Race list ==
Label of races updated as 2026 World Athletics Label Road Races.

Name	City / Race Location	Country	Month* _{*Last race was held}	Inception	Ref
Accra International Marathon	Accra	Ghana	September	2007	
Accra Milo Marathon	Accra	Ghana	October	1987	
Big Five Marathon	Limpopo	South Africa	June	2005	
Cape Town Marathon	Cape Town	South Africa	May	2007	
Casablanca Marathon	Casablanca	Morocco	October	2008	
Durban Marathon	Durban	South Africa	May	2021	
Enugu City International Marathon	Enugu	Nigeria	August	2018	
Gaborone City Marathon	Gaborone	Botswana	April	2009	
Kigali International Peace Marathon	Kigali	Rwanda	June	2005	
Kilimanjaro Marathon	Moshi	Tanzania	February	2003	
Lagos Marathon	Lagos	Nigeria	February	1983	
Lewa Marathon	Lewa Downs	Kenya	June	2000	
Liberia Marathon	Monrovia	Liberia	October	2011	
Marathon du Gabon	Libreville	Gabon	November	2013	
Marrakesh Marathon	Marrakesh	Morocco	January	1987	
Mount Cameroon Race of Hope	Mount Cameroon	Cameroon	February	1973	
Nairobi Marathon	Nairobi	Kenya	October	2003	
Rabat Marathon	Rabat	Morocco	May	2015	
Rwenzori Marathon	Kasese	Uganda	August	2022	
Soweto Marathon	Soweto	South Africa	November	1991	
Tunis–Carthage Marathon	Tunis	Tunisia	December	1986	
Uganda Marathon	Masaka	Uganda	June	2015	

== See also ==
- List of marathon races in Asia
- List of marathon races in Australia
- List of marathon races in Europe
- List of marathon races in North America
- List of marathon races in South America
- IAAF Road Race Label Events
- World Marathon Majors
