= List of marathon races =

List of marathon races may refer to:

- List of World Athletics Label marathon races
- List of marathon races in Africa
- List of marathon races in Asia
- List of marathon races in Europe
- List of marathon races in Oceania
- List of marathon races in North America
- List of marathon races in South America

Marathons are also held in unpopulated places; see Antarctic Ice Marathon, Antarctica Marathon, and North Pole Marathon.
