= List of marathon races in Oceania =

The following is a list of marathon races in Oceania.

== Legend ==
Symbol/Column	Description
**Bold**	Bold faced races are included in the World Marathon Majors
	Platinum
	Gold
	Elite
	Label
(year)	Defunct

== Race List ==
Label of races updated as 2026 World Athletics Label Road Races.

Name	City	Country	Month* _{*Last race was held}	Inception	Ref	Link
Auckland Marathon	Auckland	New Zealand	November	1992		
Belau Omal Marathon	Koror	Palau	September	2023		
Brisbane Marathon	Brisbane, Queensland	Australia	June	1992		
Canberra Marathon	Canberra	Australia	April	1976		
Gold Coast Marathon	Gold Coast, Queensland	Australia	July	1979		
Melbourne Marathon	Melbourne	Australia	October	1978		
Moʼorea Marathon	Moʼorea	Tahiti	March	1988		
Palau Marathon (defunct 2019)	Ngardmau	Palau	April	2004		
Sunshine Coast Marathon	Alexandra Headland, Queensland	Australia	August	2012		
**Sydney Marathon**	Sydney	Australia	September	2001		
Traralgon Marathon	Traralgon, Victoria	Australia	June	1968		

== See also ==
- IAAF Road Race Label Events
- List of marathon races in Africa
- List of marathon races in Asia
- List of marathon races in Europe
- List of marathon races in North America
- List of marathon races in South America
