= Timeline of Accra =

The following is a timeline of the history of the city of Accra, Ghana.

== 17th–19th centuries ==
- 1570 – Portuguese build a trading lodge called St. Vincentia.
- 1576 – Portuguese lodge destroyed.
- 1640s – Civil war in Accra.
- 1649 – Fort Crèvecœur built by the Dutch West India Company.
- 1661 – Fort Christiansborg built by the Dutch trader Henry Caerlof in Osu.
- 1673 – Fort James built by the English.
- 1677 – Akwamu attacks the Accra Kingdom and sacks the capital. King Okai Koi killed, with Ofori leading the refugees to Osu.
- 1680–81 – Akwamu sponsors a munity in Christianborg, then conquers holdout Accrans. Accra becomes a province of Akwamu.
- 1693 – Akwamu take Christianborg by subterfuge. They hold it for a year before selling it back to the Danes.
- 1731–32 – Akwamu defeated by Akyem, who take control of Accra's trade routes.
- 1742 – Akyem defeated by the Asante Empire, who take control of Accra.
- 1807 – Slave trade abolished.
- 1850 – Dutch Fort Crèvecœur ceded to British control.
- 1851 – Denmark sells its forts to Britain.
- 1871 – The Netherlands sells its forts to Britain.
- 1871 – Jamestown Light built at Fort James.
- 1874 – British capture Accra.
- 1876 – Capital of British Gold Coast relocated to Accra from Cape Coast.
- 1883 – N. Walwin Holm photography studio established.
- 1889 – Lutterodt photo studio in business (approximate date).
- 1894 – Holy Trinity Cathedral (Accra) construction begins.
- 1896 – Bank of British West Africa branch established.
- 1898 – Accra Town Council established.

== 20th century ==
- 1908 – Town boundaries expanded.
- 1909 – Anglican Diocese of Accra founded.
- 1910 – Accra Central Station and railway line to Mangoase opened.
- 1911 – Accra Hearts of Oak Sporting Club formed.
- 1914 – Excelsior Orchestra formed.
- 1918 – The Grand Orange Lodge of Ghana was established.
- 1920 – March: National Congress of British West Africa organized.
- 1922 – Construction of Wesley Methodist Cathedral commenced.
- 1923
  - Gold Coast Hospital opens.
  - Kumasi-Accra railway completed and bridge across Korle Lagoon constructed.
  - Accra High School founded.
- 1927 – Achimota College opens.
- 1929
  - National Congress of British West Africa meets in Accra.
  - Gold Coast Youth Conference meeting held.
- 1931 – Accra Academy established.
- 1937 – Population: 72,977 (estimate).
- 1939 – The 1939 Accra earthquake occurred on June 22 with a surface wave magnitude of 6.4 and a maximum Mercalli intensity of IX (Violent). Twenty-two were killed and 130 were injured, with 1,500 homes destroyed in the region. A damaging aftershock occurred on August 18, causing additional damage northeast of the city.
- 1941 – U.S. military installed at Accra airfield.
- 1943 – Catholic Apostolic Prefecture of Accra established.
- 1945 – African Morning Post newspaper begins publication.
- 1946 – Gold Coast Bulletin, Spectator Daily, and Daily Echo newspapers begins publication.
- 1948
  - February: 1948 Accra Riots.
  - Accra Evening News and Ghana Statesman newspapers begin publication.
  - University College of the Gold Coast founded.
  - Population: 135,926.
- 1949
  - Convention People's Party headquartered in Accra.
  - Gold Coast Express newspaper begins publication.
  - Gold Coast Film School founded.
- 1950
  - Daily Graphic newspaper begins publication.
  - Ghana Library Board headquartered in Accra.
  - United States Information Agency resource centre established.
- 1953 – Accra Municipal Council established.
- 1954
  - Gold Coast Broadcasting System headquartered in Accra.
  - Bomaa Accra Great Olympics football club formed.
- 1955 – Ghana International School founded.
- 1956
  - Accra Central Library established (approximate date).
  - Ghanaian Arts Council headquartered in Accra.
- 1957
  - 6 March: Accra becomes capital of independent Republic of Ghana.
  - State House, National Museum of Ghana, and Independence Arch built.
  - Catholic Holy Spirit Cathedral opened.
  - Semi-autonomous area councils created: Ablekuma, Ashiedu Keteke, Kpeshie, Okaikwei, and Osu-Klottey (approximate date).
  - Ghana Drama Studio founded.
- 1958 – All-African Peoples' Conference held.
- 1959 – National Symphony Orchestra Ghana, Ghana Press Club, and Ghana School of Journalism founded.
- 1960
  - Accra Sports Stadium opens.
  - Population: 388,000 (approximate).
- 1961
  - Black Star Square Arch erected.
  - Accra attains city status.
  - Goethe-Institut branch founded.
- 1962 – Ghana Dance Ensemble formed.
- 1963
  - Accra-Tema Development Corporation established.
  - November–December: 1963 African Cup of Nations held.
- 1964
  - Greater Accra administrative area created.
  - Boxer Muhammad Ali visits city.
- 1965
  - GTV (Ghana) headquartered in Accra.
  - Kwame Nkrumah Conference Centre built.
  - October: Organisation of African Unity summit held.
- 1966 – 24 February: Coup at Flagstaff House.
- 1967 – Association of African Universities headquartered in city.
- 1970 – Population: 564,194 city; 738,498 urban agglomeration.
- 1971 – Soul to Soul documentary film of concert at Black Star Square.
- 1974 – Napoleon Night Club active.
- 1975 – Union of Writers of African Peoples inaugurated in Accra.
- 1978 – March: 1978 African Cup of Nations held.
- 1980 – Population: 1,000,000 (estimate).
- 1982 – Greater Accra Region (administrative area) created.
- 1985 – W.E.B. Du Bois Memorial Centre for Pan-African Culture established.
- 1987
  - Accra Milo Marathon begins.
  - Integrated Social Development Centre established.
- 1988 – Pan-African Orchestra founded.
- 1989 – Ghana Stock Exchange headquartered in Accra.
  - Pan African Writers' Association (PAWA) founded.
- 1990 – Population: 1,197,000 (urban agglomeration).
- 1991 – Accra International Conference Centre built.
- 1992
  - National Theatre (Accra) opens.
  - Kwame Nkrumah Memorial Park laid out.
- 1993 – Centre for Policy Analysis and Artists Alliance Gallery established.
- 1994
  - Uniiq FM radio begins broadcasting.
  - Emmanuel Aboki Essien of the Grand Lodge of Ghana becomes the first black and African Imperial Grand President of the Orange Order.
- 1996 – Ghanaian Chronicle newspaper begins publication.
- 1998 – West Africa Network for Peacebuilding headquartered in Accra.
- 1999 – Ako Adjei Interchange opens.
- 2000
  - January–February: 2000 African Cup of Nations held.
  - Population: 1,674,000 (urban agglomeration).

== 21st century ==
- 2001 – 9 May: Accra Sports Stadium disaster.
- 2003 – Ghana-India Kofi Annan Centre of Excellence in ICT established.
- 2004
  - Stanley Nii Adjiri Blankson becomes mayor.
  - Mormon Temple dedicated.
- 2005 – Population: 1,985,000 (urban agglomeration).
- 2006 – American International School of Accra and Nubuke Foundation founded.
- 2007 – Accra International Marathon begins.
- 2008 – Golden Jubilee House inaugurated.
- 2009
  - Alfred Vanderpuije becomes mayor.
  - Population: 2,263,785 (urban agglomeration).
- 2010 – Population: 1,594,419 (city proper).
- 2011 – Google office in business.
- 2014 – September: United Nations Mission for Ebola Emergency Response headquartered in Accra.
- 3 June 2015: Flood and Fire Disaster

== See also ==
- Accra history
- List of rulers of Gã (Nkran) (Accra, Ghana)
- Neighbourhoods of Accra
- List of universities in Accra
- List of senior secondary schools in Accra
- List of hospitals in Accra
- List of radio stations in Greater Accra Region

== Bibliography ==
- "Accra" . Encyclopædia Britannica. Vol. 1 (11th ed.). 1910. p. 125.
- Accra City Handbook. Accra City Council. 1977.
- Jones J. Tetteh; C.S. Botchwey, eds. (1989). Accra, capital of Ghana. former members of the Interim Management Committee of the Accra Metropolitan Authority. ISBN 9964905041.
- Katherine V. Gough; P. Yankson (2001). "Role of Civil Society in Urban Management in Accra, Ghana". In Arne Tostensen; et al. (eds.). Associational Life in African Cities: Popular Responses to the Urban Crisis. Sweden: Nordiska Afrikainstitutet. pp. 127+. ISBN 978-91-7106-465-3.
- Agbenyega Adedze (2003). "Accra, Ghana". In Dickson Eyoh; Paul Tiyambe Zeleza (eds.). Encyclopedia of Twentieth-Century African History. Routledge. ISBN 0415234794.
- Kwame Anthony Appiah; Henry Louis Gates, eds. (2005). "Accra". Africana: The Encyclopedia of the African and African American Experience (2nd ed.). Oxford University Press. p. 18. ISBN 978-0-19-517055-9.
- Kevin Shillington, ed. (2005). "Accra". Encyclopedia of African History. Taylor & Francis. p. 15. ISBN 978-1-57958-245-6.
- John R. Weeks; et al. (2007). "Can we spot a neighborhood from the air? Defining neighborhood structure in Accra, Ghana". GeoJournal. 69.
- Alex Boakye Asiedu and Godwin Arku (2009). "The rise of gated housing estates in Ghana: Empirical insights from three communities in metropolitan Accra". Journal of Housing and the Built Environment. 24 (3): 227–247. Bibcode:2009JHTRW..24..227A. doi:10.1007/s10901-009-9146-0. JSTOR 41107466. S2CID 154912183.
- David P. Johnson Jr. (2010). "Ga". In Kwame Anthony Appiah; Henry Louis Gates (eds.). Encyclopedia of Africa. Oxford University Press. ISBN 9780195337709.
- Mobile City of Accra: Urban Families, Housing and Residential Practices, Dakar: Council for the Development of Social Science Research in Africa, 2012
- Improving Participartory Water Governance in Accra, Ghana, Canada: Centre for International Governance Innovation, 2013 – via International Relations and Security Network
- Ato Quayson (2014). Oxford Street, Accra: City Life and the Itineraries of Transnationalism. Duke University Press. ISBN 978-0-8223-7629-3.
- Marleen de Witte (2016). "Encountering religion through Accra's urban soundscape". In Jonathan Darling; Helen F. Wilson (eds.). Encountering the City: Urban Encounters from Accra to New York. Routledge. pp. 133+. ISBN 978-1-317-14395-6.
