= List of marathon races in Asia =

The following is a list of marathon race located in Asia.

== Legend ==
Symbol/Column	Description
**Bold**	Bold faced races are included in the World Marathon Majors
	Platinum
	Gold
	Elite
	Label
(year)	Defunct

== Race list ==
Name	City / Race Location	Country	Month* _{*Last race was held}	Inception	Ref
Abu Dhabi Marathon	Abu Dhabi	United Arab Emirates	December	2018	
Almaty Marathon	Almaty	Kazakhstan	April	2012	
Angkor Wat Marathons	Angkor	Cambodia			
Astana Marathon	Astana	Kazakhstan	September	2015	
Bali Marathon	Bali	Indonesia	August or September	2012	
Bangalore Marathon	Bangalore	India			
Bangkok Marathon	Bangkok	Thailand	December		
Bangsaen42 Marathon	Bang Saen Beach	Thailand	November		
Beijing Marathon	Beijing	China	October	1981	
Beirut Marathon	Beirut	Lebanon	November	2003	
Beppu-Ōita Marathon	Beppu and Ōita	Japan	February	1952	
Borneo International Marathon	Sabah	Malaysia	May	2008	
Buriram Marathon	Buriram	Thailand	January	2017	
Changsha Marathon	Changsha	China	October		
Chennai Marathon	Chennai	India			
Changan Automo Chongqing Marathon	Chongqing	China	March		
Chengdu Marathon	Chengdu	China	September		
China Asean International Marathon	Fangchenggang	China	November		
Chizhou Marathon	Chizhou	China	October		
Chuncheon Marathon	Chuncheon	South Korea			
Colombo Marathon	Colombo	Sri Lanka			
Cool City Liupanshui Marathon	Liupanshui	China	July		
Daegu Marathon	Daegu	South Korea	April	2009	
Dalian International Marathon	Dalian	China	May	1987	
Damascus Marathon	Damascus	Syria	October	2025	
Doha Marathon	Doha	Qatar	January	2013	
Dubai Marathon	Dubai	United Arab Emirates	January	1998	
Everest Marathon	Solukhumbu	Nepal			
Fukuoka Marathon	Fukuoka	Japan	December	1947	
Gaza Marathon	Gaza	Palestine		2011	
Great Wall Marathon	Huangyaguan	China			
Guangzhou Marathon	Guangzhou	China	December		
Guangzhou Huangpu Marathon	Guangzhou	China	December		
Gunsan Saemangeum International Marathon	Gunsan	South Korea	April		
Gyeongju International Marathon	Gyeongju	South Korea			
Hangzhou International Marathon	Hangzhou	China	November	1987	
Hanoi Marathon	Hanoi	Vietnam			
Harbin Marathon	Harbin	China	August		
Hofu Marathon	Hōfu	Japan	December	1970	
Hokkaido Marathon	Hokkaido	Japan	August		
Hong Kong Marathon	Hong Kong	Hong Kong	February	1997	
Indira Marathon	Prayagraj	India			
International Mersin Marathon	Mersin	Turkey	December		
Issyk-Kul Marathon	Cholpon-Ata	Kyrgyzstan	May	2012	
Izmir Marathon	İzmir	Turkey	April	2020	
Jakarta Marathon	Jakarta	Indonesia	October	2013	
Jerusalem Marathon	Jerusalem	Israel			
Jilin City International Marathon	Jilin	China	May		
Kaohsiung International Marathon	Kaohsiung	Republic of China			
Kobe Marathon	Kobe	Japan	November		
Kolkata Marathon	Kolkata	India	February	2008	
Korat Marathon	Nakhon Ratchasima	Thailand	November		
Kuala Lumpur Marathon	Kuala Lumpur	Malaysia	October		
Kunming Marathon	Kunming	China	December		
Kuwait Marathon	Kuwait	Kuwait	November		
Kyoto Marathon	Kyoto	Japan			
Ladakh Marathon	Ladakh	India			
Lahore Marathon	Lahore	Pakistan			
Lake Biwa Marathon	Ōtsu	Japan			
Lanzhou Marathon	Lanzhou	China	May	2011	
Macau Marathon	Macau	Macau	June		
Manila Marathon	Manila	Philippines	June	1982	
Mizuno Ekiden	Singapore	Singapore			
Mumbai Marathon	Mumbai	India	January	2004	
Nagoya Women's Marathon	Nagoya	Japan	March	1980	
Nanchang Marathon	Nanchang	China	November		
Nanning Marathon	Nanning	China	December		
New Taipei City Wan Jin Shi Marathon	New Taipei City	Republic of China	March	1979	
Osaka International Ladies Marathon	Osaka	Japan	January	1982	
Palestine Marathon	Bethlehem	Palestine	March	2013	
Pattaya Marathon	Pattaya	Thailand			
Penang Bridge International Marathon	Penang	Malaysia			
Pune International Marathon	Pune	India			
Pyongyang Marathon	Pyongyang	North Korea			
Qingdao Marathon	Qingdao	China	April		
Riyadh Marathon	Riyadh	Saudi Arabia	February	2022	
Ahmedabad Marathon	Ahmedabad	India	November	2017	
Seoul International Marathon	Seoul	South Korea	March	1931	
Seoul Marathon	Seoul	South Korea	November	1999	
Shanghai Marathon	Shanghai	China	March		
Shenyang Marathon	Shenyang	China	September		
Shenzhen Marathon	Shenzhen	China	December		
Shijiazhuang Marathon	Shijiazhuang	China	April		
Singapore Marathon	Singapore	Singapore	December	1982	
Sleemon Shaoxing Marathon	Shaoxing	China	November		
Songkhla International Marathon	Songkhla	Thailand	August		
Sundown Marathon	Singapore	Singapore			
Suzhou Taihu Marathon	Suzhou	China	March		
Taipei Marathon	Taipei	Republic of China	December	1986	
Taiyuan Marathon	Taiyuan	China	September		
Taj Mahal Marathon	Agra	India			
Taroko Gorge International Marathon	Hualien	Republic of China			
Tashkent Marathon	Tashkent	Uzbekistan	March		
Tel Aviv Marathon	Tel Aviv	Israel			
Three Gorges Marathon	Chongqing	China	December		
Tiberias Marathon	Sea of Galilee	Israel			
**Tokyo Marathon**	Tokyo	Japan	March		
Ulaanbaatar Marathon	Ulaanbaatar	Mongolia	May		
Wuhan Marathon	Wuhan	China	April		
Wuxi Marathon	Wuxi	China	March		
Xiamen International Marathon	Xiamen	China	January	2003	
Xi'an Marathon	Xi'an	China	October		
Xichang Qionghai Lake Wetland International Marathon	Xichang	China	November		
Yellow River Estuary Marathon	Dongying	China	October		
Yinchuan Marathon	Yinchuan	China	May	2017	

Some of these marathons can be run in conjunction with shorter races.
