= Palau–Taiwan relations =

- Palau: Taiwan

Diplomatic mission
- Embassy of Palau in the Republic of China: Embassy of the Republic of China (Taiwan) in Palau

Envoy
- Ambassador David Orrukem: Ambassador Jessica Chienyi Lee

Palau–Taiwan relations are the bilateral relations between the Republic of Palau and the Republic of China (Taiwan). Palau maintains an embassy in Taipei and Taiwan maintains an embassy in Koror City. Exchanges between the two nations range from agriculture, culture, education, fishery, medical services, tourism and water supply infrastructure. As of 13 June 2025, Palau is one of only 12 United Nations member states to have formal diplomatic relations with Taiwan.

== History ==
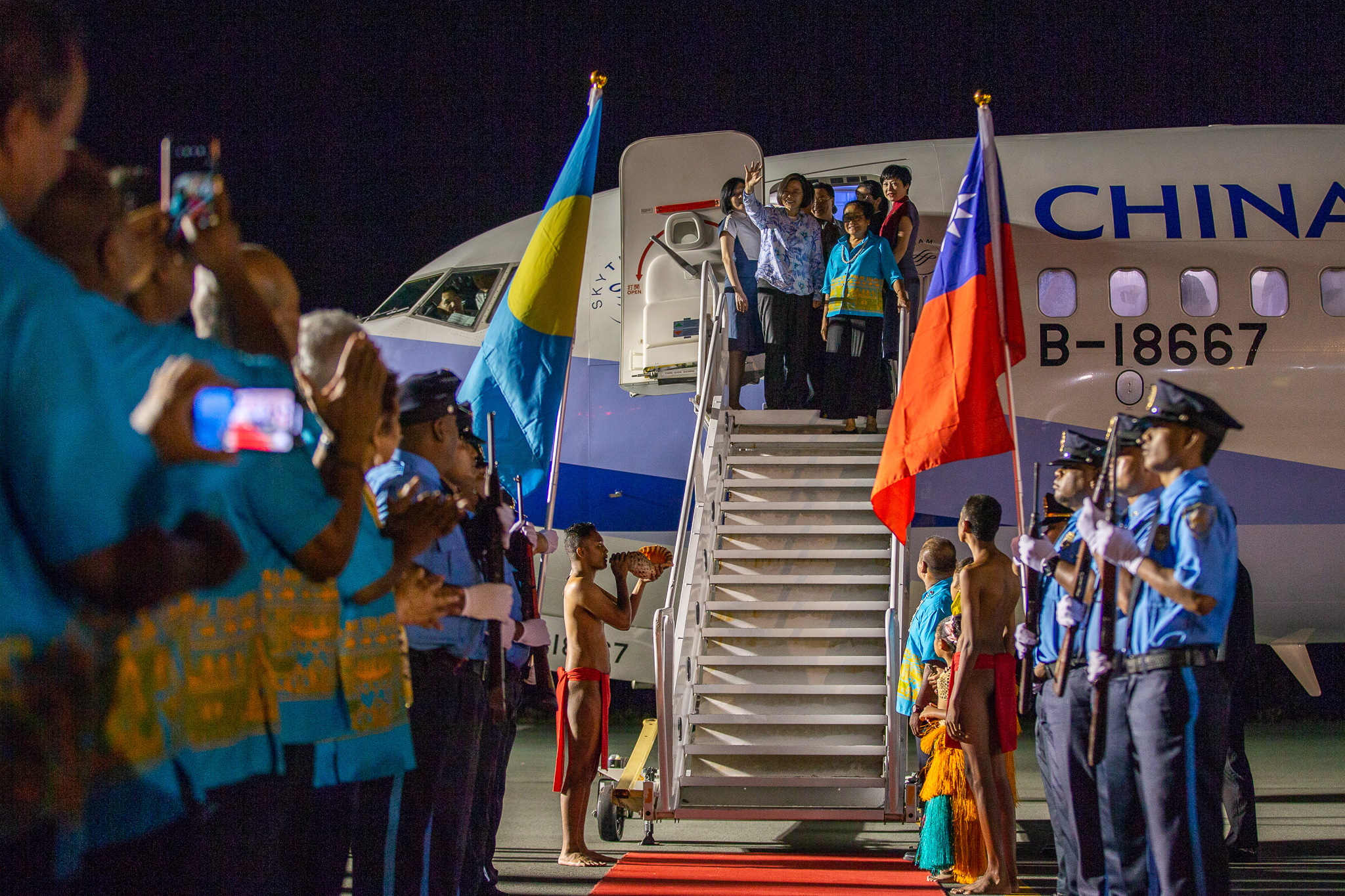
President of the Republic of China Tsai Ing-wen visiting Palau in 2019

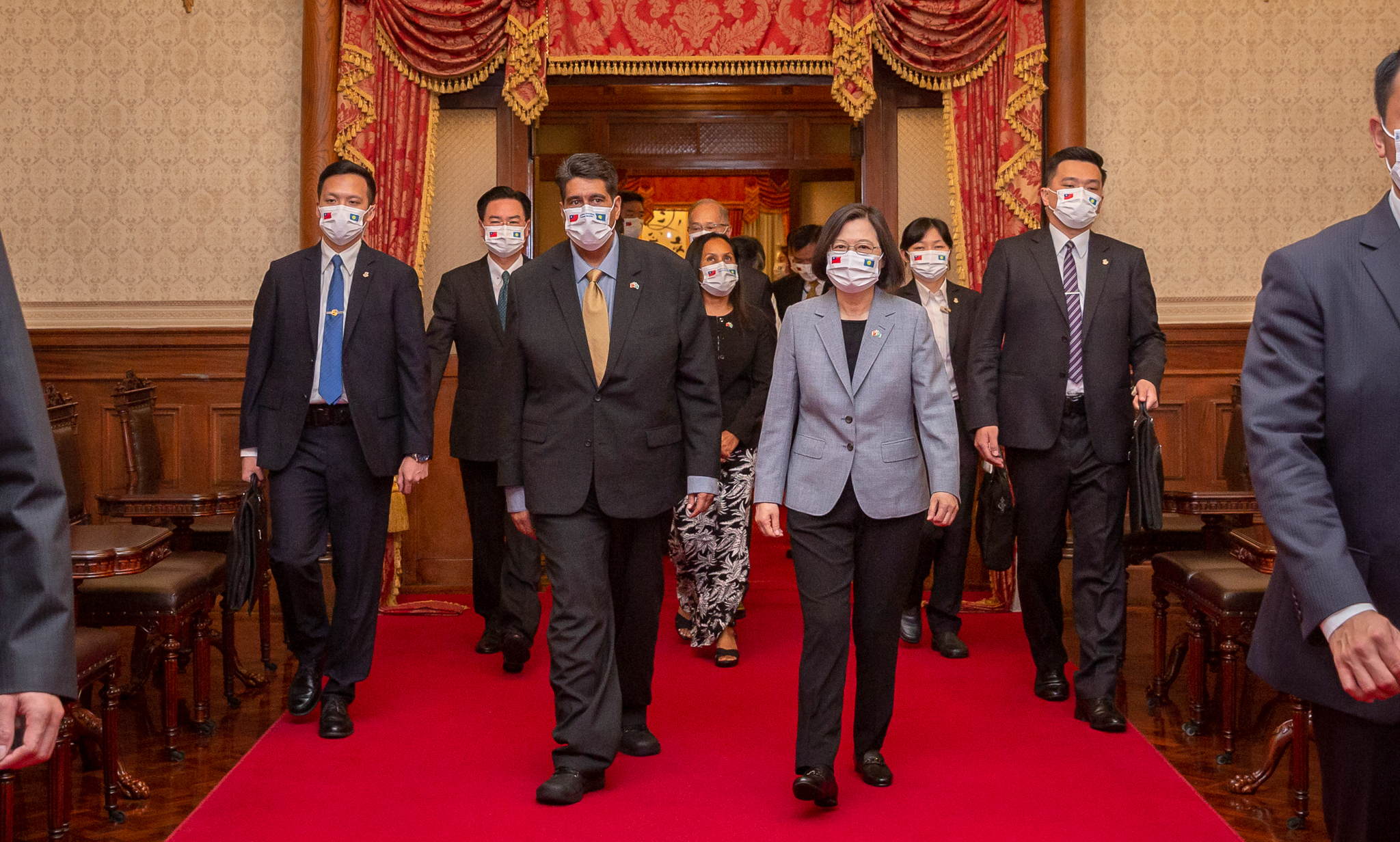
President of Palau Surangel Whipps Jr. visiting Taiwan in 2021

Palau and Taiwan have had economic and political relations since 1994. In late December 1999, Palau officially established diplomatic relations with the ROC. Taiwan have funded Palauan buildings such as the Palasia Hotel, Palau Royal Resort, Hung Kuo Resort and Papago International Resort. In 2010, a petroleum company of the People's Republic of China signed a US$40 million cooperation with Palau to explore oil reserve around the islands country.

On June 6, 2017, Palau Health Minister Emais Roberts visited Taipei. In December 2017, Palau's ambassador to Taiwan stated that Palau–Taiwan relations were "extremely stable", and that Palau would not shift diplomatic relations to mainland China. President Tsai Ing-wen visited Palau in 2019 and President Surangel Whipps Jr. visited Taiwan in 2021.

In April 2021, a travel bubble was set up between Palau and Taiwan. Though travel restrictions were introduced in May 2021 due to increased COVID-19 cases in Taiwan. In December 2021, the Taiwanese government donated a statue of former Palauan president Kuniwo Nakamura for his role in establishing relations between the two countries in December 1999 with the Embassy of the Republic of China in the Republic of Palau stating that his legacy will "always be remembered and honored by both Taiwan and Palau people".

== Academic relations ==
In 2017, Palau National Scholarship Board and Kainan University signed a memorandum of understanding to establish bilateral relations in research and cultural exchange between the two countries. Through the agreement, Kainan University would waive tuition and fees of two students recommended by PNSB and accepted to attend Kainan.

Taiwan's Ministry of Education facilitated a service project to establish cooperation between the National Taiwan University's Center of Teacher Education and Palau High School. The program took place in January and February 2023, after two years of planning and five months of training. In September 2023, Taiwan's National Sun Yat-sen University signed an MOU with several Palauan institutions to establish collaboration of blue carbon economy and climate change studies.

== Sports ==
Taiwan sponsored the Belau Omal Marathon and the first International Baseball Classic tournament in Palau. The tournament took place at Palau Asahi Field in June 2024.

In January 2025, Taiwan's Sports Administration signed an agreement with the Palau National Olympic Committee during foreign minister Lin Chia-lung's visit to Palau.

== See also ==
- Foreign relations of Palau
- Foreign relations of Taiwan
