= Shakhmardan Yessenov Foundation =

Charitable foundation based in Kazakhstan

- Formation: 2013; 13 years ago
- Founders: Galimzhan Yessenov
- Headquarters: Almaty, Kazakhstan
- Chairperson: Aizhan Yessim
- Website: yessenovfoundation.org

The Shakhmardan Yessenov Science and Education Foundation is a Kazakhstani non-profit organization established in 2013 by Galimzhan Yessenov, a Kazakh businessman and philanthropist. He actively supports education, science, and sports in Kazakhstan, funding scholarships, research programs, and youth chess development initiatives.

The foundation supports undergraduate, graduate, residency, and internship students, and young professionals in the fields of exact and natural sciences, medicine, and information technology, who aim to continue their education (PhD, Master’s degree, internships, training programs, or courses), and are motivated and actively contributing to scientific development in Kazakhstan.

The Shakhmardan Yessenov Foundation supports education through its student scholarship program, which provides 20 monthly scholarships of 70,000 tenge each to talented university students in Kazakhstan. Eligible participants include Kazakhstani citizens over 18 years old, studying in natural sciences, technical, medical, and IT fields, specifically 2nd-3rd year undergraduate students and 2nd-5th year medical students. This initiative aims to foster academic excellence and support the development of young professionals in key scientific and technological fields.

== History and initiatives ==
The Shakhmardan Yessenov Science and Education Foundation was established in 2013 by Galimzhan Yessenov. It is named after Shahmardan Yesenov, a prominent Kazakh-Soviet geologist and statesman.

Shakhmardan Yessenov (1927–1994) was a geologist, scientist, and statesman, known for his contributions to the discovery and development of major mineral and hydrocarbon deposits in Kazakhstan. He served as Minister of Geology of the Kazakh SSR (1961–1967, 1974–1976), Vice-Chairman of the Council of Ministers of the Kazakh SSR (1965), and President of the Academy of Sciences of the Kazakh SSR (1967–1974). Yessenov played a key role in the geological exploration of Zhezkazgan, Mangistau, and other resource-rich regions, expanding Kazakhstan’s industrial base. His innovative methods significantly increased the efficiency of mineral exploration and extraction, leading to the discovery of vital copper, manganese, and polymetallic deposits. In recognition of his contributions, the Aktau Polytechnic Institute was renamed the Aktau Yessenov Polytechnic Institute in 1995. Alongside Kanysh Satpayev and Evney Buketov, he is regarded as one of Kazakhstan’s most influential scientists, shaping the country's geological and industrial landscape.

=== Programs ===
- Internships
- Yessenov Scholarship
- English Language
- Yessenov Data Lab
- Find Your Way
- Yessenov LaunchPad
- Developing Chess Education
- Yessenov Lectures
- Travel Grants
- Conferences
- Book Publishing

=== The Almaty Marathon ===
The Shakhmardan Yessenov Foundation supports Almaty Marathon, which raises funds for charity and supports specialized boarding schools for children with disabilities. The Almaty Marathon is an annual mass sports event in Kazakhstan, first held in 2012. Since then, it has grown into a major international race, attracting 16,149 runners from 60 countries.

=== Chess education ===
The foundation is a key supporter of chess development in Kazakhstan and has served as the general partner of the Kazakh Chess Federation since 2015. The foundation actively promotes youth chess by supporting national teams, including their participation in international competitions such as the FIDE World Youth Under 16 Chess Olympiad, where Kazakhstan achieved its best result to date in 2019. Additionally, the foundation contributes to chess education and talent development, fostering the growth of young Kazakh players on the global stage. The foundation supports chess education in Kazakhstan through initiatives like the Chess in School pilot project. Launched in partnership with the Kazakhstan Chess Federation, the project introduced chess lessons in 19 schools across Almaty, Kyzylorda, and Pavlodar regions, benefiting approximately 1,500 students. The foundation provided schools with methodological guidebooks, textbooks, workbooks, and teacher training to integrate chess into the curriculum. This initiative aims to enhance students' logical thinking, memory, and concentration, with plans for expansion to additional regions.

From 2015 to 2019, the Kazakhstan Chess Federation (KCF), under the leadership of Galimzhan Yessenov, actively promoted chess as an intellectual sport. The Shakhmardan Yessenov Science and Education Foundation was the general sponsor from July 2015 to March 2020, supporting national and international tournaments, youth programs, and chess education. The Chess at School initiative introduced chess into 58 schools, enhancing students' cognitive skills. The Federation organized over 20 national tournaments annually and strengthened Kazakhstan’s presence in international chess competitions. Infrastructure development included the establishment of new training centers and chess clubs, improving access to chess education.

The Chess at School project, implemented by the Shakhmardan Yessenov Foundation in partnership with the Kazakhstan Chess Federation, introduced chess as a subject in 18 experimental schools across Almaty, Kyzylorda, and Pavlodar regions for students in grades 2–4. The project included a study on cognitive development, comparing chess students with those in control groups. The results demonstrated that students who learned chess exhibited higher intelligence, creativity, and academic performance after three years. As part of the initiative, 58 schools received chess room equipment, while 18 schools were provided with printed textbooks and others with electronic materials. A report on the program's impact was submitted to the Ministry of Education and Science of Kazakhstan, recommending the inclusion of chess as a variable subject in the national curriculum.

=== Research and publications ===
The foundation supports geological research and education in Kazakhstan and co-hosted the conference alongside the Institute of Seismology of Kazakhstan, the National Research Technical University, and the "Earthquakes Without Frontiers" project from the UK. The Earthquakes Without Frontiers (EwF) Project focused on enhancing earthquake resilience through collaborative fieldwork, knowledge-sharing, and policy engagement in Nepal, India (Bihar State), China, and Kazakhstan, with additional interactions across Central Asia, Iran, India, and Southern Europe. The project adopted a transdisciplinary approach, integrating natural and social sciences with policymaking and practical applications. A final workshop in Oxford (July 2018) brought together 20 UK-based researchers to evaluate outcomes, with broader contributions from participants who drafted three performance stories on key case studies. The report summarizes the lessons and insights gained, with the authors acknowledging the contributions of all involved.

The Shakhmardan Yessenov Foundation, in collaboration with Khan Comics, is publishing Kazakhstan’s first action comic book that introduces everyday physics through engaging adventures. Targeted at children (6+) and teenagers, with an appeal to adults, the 10-issue series is inspired by Yakov Perelman’s "Entertaining Physics" and aims to visualize scientific concepts in a modern and accessible way. The story follows four teenagers exploring Kazakhstan’s landmarks while assisting Physics, the main character, in restoring natural balance. The comics are available in Kazakh and Russian.

The foundation has developed a comprehensive guide on admission to internships and Ph.D. programs at foreign universities. The manual provides detailed insights into key aspects of the application process, including the role of recommendation letters, writing a strong motivational essay, and crafting an effective resume. It also offers guidance on establishing communication with university professors and features practical advice from students who have successfully navigated these stages.

== Management ==
=== Board of Trustees ===
  - Galimzhan Yessenov, founder of the Foundation;
  - Aizhan Yessim - the founder of the International Almaty Marathon, Chairperson;
  - Serik Akhanov is a Doctor of Economics, professor, and Honorary Member of the Board of Trustees since 2015, with extensive experience in Kazakhstan’s state and financial sectors, having served as Deputy Minister of Finance, Vice-Chairman of the National Bank, and First Deputy Minister of Economy. He is the author of over 100 scientific publications and notable books on macroeconomics and finance, including The Socio-Economic Efficiency of Social Production Amidst Intensification (1985) and National Capital (2010).
  - Aigul Imadildayeva, software engineer and the head of POWR's office in Kazakhstan, specializing in IT security and management;
  - Eldar Akhmetgaliyev, data specialist, co-founder of Mocap Analytics, and Adjunct Professor at Simon Fraser University (Canada). He holds a BA and MSc from the Moscow Institute of Physics and Technology (2009) and a PhD in Applied and Computational Mathematics from the California Institute of Technology (2015).
