= Galimzhan Yessenov =

Kazakh businessman (born 1982)

- Ғалымжан Есенов
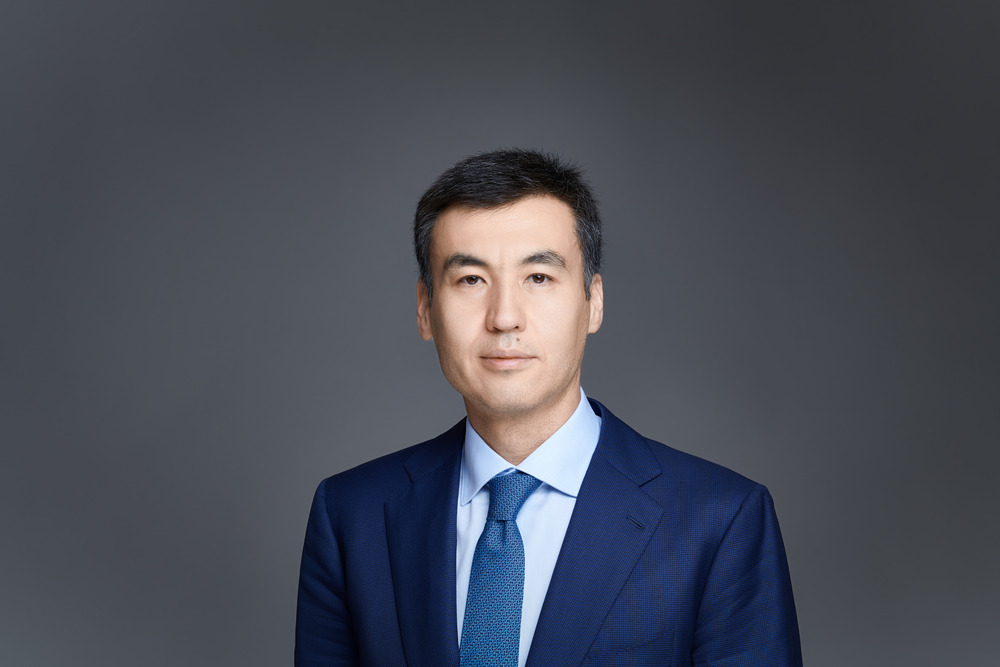

Personal details
- Born: 10 March 1982 (age 44) Almaty, Kazakh SSR, Soviet Union
- Education: KazGUU, Eurasian Institute of Market, University of Chicago Booth School of Business

Galimzhan Yessenov (Kazakh: Галимжан Шахмарданұлы Есенов; born 10 March 1982) is a Kazakhstani businessman, philanthropist, founder of the Scientific and Educational Foundation named after academician Shakhmardan Yessenov. Cavalier of the Order of Kurmet.

== Biography ==
Yessenov was born in 1982 in Almaty. The Yessenov family are notable members of the Kazakh intelligentsia. Yessenov's grandfather was Shakhmardan Yessenov, a notable scientist and academic of Kazakhstan Academy of Sciences. Yessenov named his educational foundation after his grandfather. Yessenov graduated from the Eurasian Market Institute with a degree in Economics and Management, and KazGUU University with a degree in Law. He holds an Executive MBA from the University of Chicago Booth School of Business.

== Career ==
Yessenov began his career in 1999 with Golden Grain, an agro-industrial complex, where he managed the machinery operation and fuel supply departments. From December 2018 to May 2021 he was Chairman of the Supervisory Board of Kazphosphate LLP. From 2011 to 2013 he was General Director of KNG Finance LLP.

In April 2013, KNG Finance acquired ATF Bank JSC, the fifth largest bank in Kazakhstan by assets from Italy's UniCredit. Galimzhan Yessenov became a major shareholder in ATF Bank JSC.

In July 2023, Galimzhan Yessenov became the majority shareholder of Jusan Bank. He was transferred ownership of First Heartland Securities JSC and was elected as the Chairman of the Board of Directors of First Heartland Securities JSC. Yessenov was transferred 80% shares of Jusan Bank, bringing his total share holding to almost 100% of Jusan Bank. The share transfer was part of a large Settlement that discontinued numerous legal disputes between the Jusan Bank shareholders, the Republic of Kazakhstan, and Galimzhan Yessenov. Under the settlement, Jusan Bank was successfully returned to Kazakh ownership.

From August 2023 to September 2024, Galimzhan Yessenov served as Chairman of the Board of Directors of Jusan Bank.

From July 2023 to July 2025, was a major shareholder of Jusan Bank.

== Charitable activities ==
=== Education ===
In February 2013, Galimzhan Yessenov established the Academician Shakhmardan Yessenov Science and Educational Foundation. The foundation implements a number of educational and scientific programs, including scholarships, internships, English language training for students and teachers, IELTS preparations, a big data analysis school, and guest lectures.. The Foundation is committed to promoting the development of higher education, science, and innovation in Kazakhstan. Until 2020, the Shakhmardan Yessenov Foundation was also actively involved in popularizing chess at schools across the country. This included training teachers and publishing textbooks, which are still available for free download on the Fonudation`s website.

Since the establishment of the Shakhmardan Yessenov Foundation in 2013, more than 2,700 talented Kazakh students and scientists have become grant recipients. Some of them had the opportunity to complete the research internships in leading laboratories in the US, the UK, Canada and Switzerland, as well as internships at IT startups in Silicon Valley.

In 2022, the Foundation granted 10 scholarships to university applicants from low-income families. In 2023, 19 Kazakh undergraduate students were the winners of the Yessenov Scholarship program, which is held annually by the SY Foundation.

In 2026, the Shakhmardan Yessenov Foundation awarded 6 scholarships to university applicants from low-income families. In 2026, 20 Kazakhstani undergraduate students became winners of the Yessenov Scholarship Program, which is run annually by the Shakhmardan Yessenov Foundation. Over the 13 years of the Foundation`s existence, a total of 216 people have become scholarship recipients.

=== Almaty Marathon ===
A keen sportsperson, Galimzhan Yessenov has been a promoter of amateur sport in Almaty and Kazakhstan for many years.

In 2017 Yessenov founded the Almaty marathon, through his charitable fund "Courage to be First". In 2018, the Almaty Marathon was attended by 14 thousand people, and in 2019 a record 17 thousand people from 53 countries took part in the marathon. It has grown to be one of the largest sporting events in Central Asia.

In 2018, funds raised by the Almaty marathon were donated to an oncology hospice and two specialized schools for children with special developmental needs, as well as being used to build sports grounds, a soccer field and to purchase sports equipment.

In 2019, part of the funds raised by the marathon were allocated for the construction of sports grounds in three special children's institutions.

In 2020, despite the cancellation of the marathon due to the pandemic, 5 institutions for children with special needs and orphanages received support from the Foundation.

In 2021, football and workout grounds were built for three organisations.

In 2022, the Foundation built sports fields for three children's institutions, and provided equipment to a rehabilitation centre for children with cerebral palsy and racing buggies for immobile athletes.

In 2023, 8 institutions became beneficiaries of the Foundation, including social service centres and an orphanage.

On 28 September 2025, 14th Almaty Marathon attracted 16,149 participants from 60 countries, setting a new record for the number of runners competing in the full marathon (42.2 km), with 1,500 participants. As a part of its charitable initiatives, the event partnered with the AYALA Foundation to allocate 145 million tenge towards equipping medical clinics with specialised equipment for treating paediatric conditions.

On 27 September 2026, the 15th Almaty Marathon took place, attracting 16,000 participants from 66 countries. For the first time since 2018, the organisers completely redesigned the routes for all race distances. The full marathon also featured a single-loop course for the first time, passing through central Almaty and the city`s historic districts.

The amount allocated from the Almaty Marathon starting fees to charity increase every year. The first marathon in 2012 raised 292,500 tenge for social projects, whereas in 2024 the amount of aid totalled 106,241,284 tenge.

The thirteenth Almaty Marathon took place on 29 September 2024 and saw 15,000 athletes from 28 countries compete. There was additional focus on the event’s carbon footprint; disposable structures were not used and all collateral was made of biodegradable materials.

=== Other sporting activities ===
From November 7, 2017 to July 1, 2022 Yessenov was the head of Almaty Triathlon Federation. From October 2017 to July 2022 Yessenov was Vice President of the Kazakhstan Triathlon Federation and the Almaty Triathlon Federation. He was also President of the Central Asian Triathlon Association from March 2019 to July 2022. From June 19, 2019 to March 24, 2023 Yessenov was a Board Member of the Asian Triathlon Confederation (ASTC).

In August 2018, Galimzhan Yessenov competed in the annual IRONMAN 140.6 held in Copenhagen, Denmark. Yessenov finished with a time of 12 hours 45 minutes 21 seconds. Also in August 2024, he took part in the IRONMAN in Kalmar (Sweden), successfully finishing with a time of 12 hours 39 minutes 13 seconds.

From December 2018 to February 2020 Yessenov was President of the United MMA Federation, President of the Association of United Federations of Kazakhstan in MMA and President of the Kazakhstan United Federation of Mixed Martial Arts MMA; and from November 2019 to April 2022 he was a Member of the Board of Directors of the International Mixed Martial Arts Federation (IMMAF)

=== Other activities ===
From July 2015 to January 2020, Yessenov was President of the Chess Federation of the Republic of Kazakhstan. In 2016, the Kazakhstan Chess Federation organized the first "Almaty Open" chess tournament, which brought together over 100 participants with a total prize fund of 2.5 million tenge. Yessenov is a member of the Young President's Organisation Kazakhstan. He also supported the Mom's House (Anayyi) Charity project, building crisis centres for single mothers, and providing care for orphans with special needs. The project has successfully reduced orphanhood statistics in Kazakhstan over the first two years of its operation. By 2018, "Mother's House" helped 3,047 Kazakh children not to become orphans and find homes.

== Personal life ==
He was previously married and has one son.
