= Lukas Wambua Muteti =

Kenyan long-distance runner

Personal information
- Nationality: Kenya
- Born: Lukas Wambua Muteti Muumoni, Machakos County, Kenya

Sport
- Country: KENYA
- Sport: Athletics
- Event: Long-distance
- Club: ngong hills

Lukas Wambua Muteti (born in Muumoni, Machakos County, Kenya) is a Kenyan long-distance runner and the founder of MiraRunners, a non-profit organization that assists Kenyan runners in Asia. He has won various prestigious international marathons, including the Bangkok Standard Chartered Marathon and Kaohsiung International Marathon.
