= Samuel Kanyon Doe Sports Complex =

Stadium in Liberia

Coordinates: 6°15′24″N 10°42′8″W

- SKD, SKD Stadium
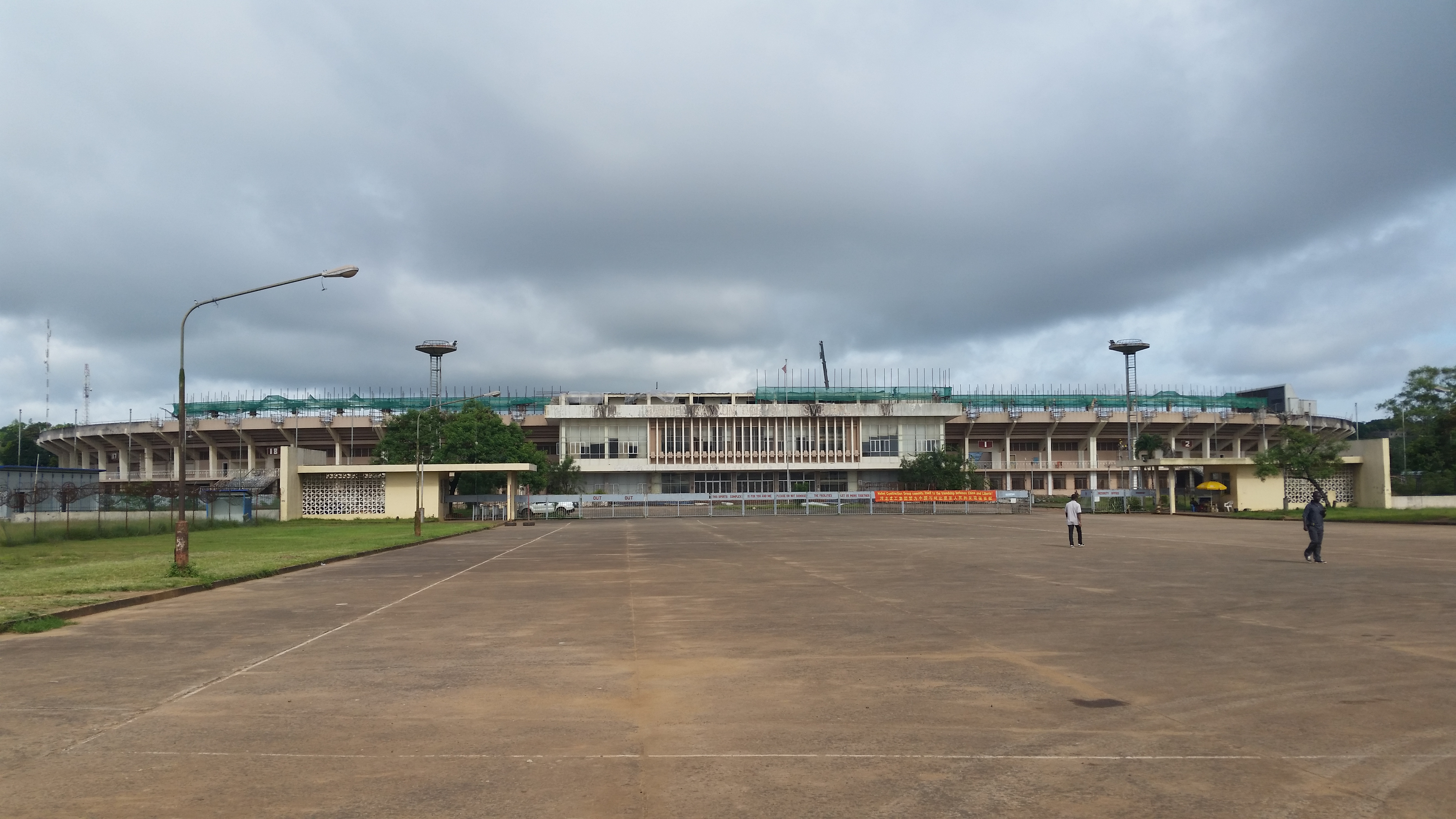
- Interactive map of Samuel Kanyon Doe Sports Complex
- Location: Paynesville, Liberia
- Capacity: 22,000
- Surface: Grass
- Record attendance: 60,000 (Liberia vs Malawi, 11 June 1989)

Construction
- Opened: 1986
- Renovated: 2005

Tenant
- Liberia national football team (1986–present)

The Samuel Kanyon Doe Sports Stadium (frequently abbreviated SKD Stadium) is a multi-purpose stadium which is part of the Samuel Kanyon Doe Sports Complex in Paynesville, Liberia, a suburb of the country's capital, Monrovia. Built in 1986, it is used mostly for football matches and has an athletics track, though it has also been used for a reggae concert, political rallies, IDP refuge, and Ebola treatment. The largest stadium in Liberia, its spectator capacity is 22,000.

== Background ==
The stadium was commissioned by President William Tolbert, who did not start the construction and was removed from power in a 1980 coup d'état by 17 enlisted men of the Armed Forces of Liberia led by Samuel Doe. Completed during Doe's reign, he named the facility after himself.

During Liberia's second civil war, thousands sought refuge in the stadium. On 24 June 2003, following the breakdown of a ceasefire, there were a reported 58,000 IDPs in the stadium, more than 5% of Monrovia's estimated 1,000,000 residents.

The stadium has had frequent problems with overcrowding, due on at least one occasion to illegal ticket sales. In 2008, eight people died of suffocation following a football match, and in 2014, spectators were reported to have fainted.

The stadium has been the site of international concerts, national political events, and multiple World Cup qualifying matches. In 1988, the Reggae Sunsplash concert was held in SKD. The 24-hour long event featured Burning Spear, Yellowman, and other well-known roots and dancehall reggae artists flown in from Jamaica. During the campaign for the Liberian general election in 2011 the Congress for Democratic Change held exclusive rallies in the stadium.

In 2022, the stadium was used as the endpoint for all races during the 2022 Liberia Marathon.

== Renovations ==
In September 2005, a $7.6 million (~$11.7 million in 2024) renovation funded by China was announced and Chinese company Hunan Constructing Engineering Group Corporation was named as the contractor. After the two-year renovation was complete, Liberia lacked the expertise to manage the electronic scoreboard. The grass was badly damaged after a 2009 international women's conference.

In October 2013, another agreement was signed between the governments of Liberia and China funding a $18 million (~$23.8 million in 2024) renovation of the stadium. The plans for the second renovation included the practice pitch and tennis courts that were not repaired six years earlier. In February 2020, Shao Kaipeng of the Hebei Construction Group, the Chinese construction firm renovating the SKD, pleaded with Liberians to maintain the stadium. Shao said, "I do not understand why people will come to watch game and break the things that can make the stadium beautiful; why will they throw garbage on the stadium?" and requested that the government hire more people to clean the stadium and to provide security after games.

Matches between Liberian county teams were reported in early 2014.

== Ebola treatment ==
During the Ebola virus epidemic in Liberia, SKD was the site of a Chinese-built Ebola treatment unit. The 100-bed hospital, constructed by the Chinese firm CNQC, was planned for 160 specialized medical personnel from China. It opened in November 2014 with a ceremony attended by President Sirleaf In May 2015 the ETU was decommissioned after treating 10 confirmed cases and admitting 110 patients. The 20-room facility and its more than 920,000 items, including more than 1,500 kinds of medical instruments and materials worth approximately $7 million, was turned over to the Liberian government. As part of the ceremony, President Sirleaf was presented with a flag of the People's Liberation Army medical team.

In August 2015, Chinese foreign minister Wang Yi visited SKD stadium and met with Chinese workers.

== International football matches ==
Date	Competition	Team	Res	Team
11 Sep 2018	International Friendly	Liberia	1-2	Nigeria
