= Kaohsiung Fubon Marathon =

Marathon race in Taiwan

- Date: February
- Location: Kaohsiung, Taiwan
- Event type: Road
- Distance: Marathon
- Primary sponsor: Fubon Financial
- Established: 2010
- Course records: Men: 2:13:18 (2017) (Kenya) Noah Chepngabit; Women: 2:37:15 (2016) (Kenya) Monica Ndiritu
- Website: Kaohsiung International Marathon

The Kaohsiung Fubon Marathon (Chinese: 高雄富邦馬拉松) is an annual city marathon held in Kaohsiung, Taiwan. It has been held each February since 2010 by the Kaohsiung City Government and Chinese Taipei Track and Field Association, and was previously sponsored by the Mizuno Corporation. Events held include the full marathon (42.195 km), a 25 km run, and a 4.5 km race. The event is officially accredited by the Association of International Marathons and Distance Races, and attracted over 30,000 participants in 2013.

== Past winners ==
Key: Course record

=== Marathon ===
Edition	Year	Men's winner	Time (h:m:s)	Women's winner	Time (h:m:s)
1st	2010	Richard Mutisya (KEN)	2:28:49	Li Hsiao-yu (TPE)	3:07:40
2nd	2011	Alex Melly (KEN)	2:20:48	Susan Chemutai (KEN)	3:08:12
3rd	2012	Francis Kibii (KEN)	2:20:16	Li Hsiao-yu (TPE)	3:01:29
4th	2013	Pius Mutuku (KEN)	2:21:39	Chen Shu-hua (TPE)	2:49:07
5th	2014	Josphat Too (KEN)	2:17:55	Hsu Yu-fang (TPE)	2:42:10
6th	2015	Josphat Too (KEN)	2:15:19	Edinah Kwambai (KEN)	2:40:40
7th	2016	Charles Kigen (KEN)	2:16:21	Monica Ndiritu (KEN)	2:37:15
8th	2017	Noah Chepngabit (KEN)	2:13:18	Jedidah Karungu (KEN)	2:38:41
9th	2018	Charles Kigen (KEN)	2:17:40	He Yinli (CHN)	2:42:24
10th	2019	Kennedy Lilan (KEN)	2:18:43	Jemimah Wayua (KEN)	2:44:45
–	2020	Was not held due to COVID-19 pandemic			

=== 23km ===
Edition	Year	Men's winner	Time (h:m:s)	Women's winner	Time (h:m:s)
1st	2010	Ho Jin-wen (TPE)	1:24:39	Tseng Yi-ching (TPE)	1:47:12
2nd	2011	Wu Wen-chien (TPE)	1:14:45	Hsieh Chien-he (TPE)	1:27:46
3rd	2012	Chan Chun-wei (TPE)	1:19:16	Chen Shu-hua (TPE)	1:30:06
4th	2013	Ho Chin-ping (TPE)	1:13:44	Liao Pei-ling (TPE)	1:33:52

=== 25km (15 miles) ===
Starting from 2014, the race distance was raised from 23 km to 25 km, which is an IAAF-recognised race distance. Winners:

Edition	Year	Men's winner	Time (h:m:s)	Women's winner	Time (h:m:s)
5th	2014	Ho Chin-ping (TPE)	1:19:29	Hsieh Chien-he (TPE)	1:34:11
6th	2015	Zhu Jun-zhe (TPE)	1:27:10	Hsieh Chien-he (TPE)	1:31:23
7th	2016	Lukas Wambua (KEN)	1:21:44	Careen Cheptoeck (KEN)	1:30:23
8th	2017	Tenai Mathayo (KEN)	1:21:16	Hannah Wabera (KEN)	1:31:30
9th	2018	Peter Ndolo (KEN)	1:21:44	Hsieh Chien-he (TPE)	1:33:18
10th	2019	Kurita Okamoto (JPN)	1:23:10	Hsieh Chien-he (TPE)	1:33:00
–	2020	Was not held due to COVID-19 pandemic			

== See also ==
- List of sporting events in Taiwan
- New Taipei City Wan Jin Shi Marathon
- Taipei Marathon
- List of marathon races in Asia
