= List of marathon races in South America =

The following is a list of marathon races in South America.

== Legend ==
Symbol/Column	Description
**Bold**	Bold faced races are included in the World Marathon Majors
	Platinum
	Gold
	Elite
	Label
(year)	Defunct

== Race list ==
Label of races updated as 2026 World Athletics Label Road Races.

Name	City / Race Location	Country	Month* _{*Last race was held}	Inception	Ref
Asunción International Marathon	Asunción	Paraguay	August	2010	
Buenos Aires Marathon	Buenos Aires	Argentina	October	1984	
Cali Marathon	Cali	Colombia	May	2025	
Curitiba Marathon	Curitiba	Brazil	November	1995	
Florianópolis International Marathon	Florianópolis	Brazil	August	2017	
Foz do Iguaçu International Marathon	Foz do Iguaçu	Brazil	September	2007	
Guayaquil Marathon	Guayaquil	Ecuador	October	2005	
Lima Marathon	Lima	Peru	May	2009	
Los Andes Marathon	Mantaro Valley, Junín	Peru	November	1984	
Mar del Plata Marathon	Mar del Plata	Argentina	December	1987	
Medellín Marathon	Medellín	Colombia	September	1995	
Mendoza Marathon	Mendoza	Argentina	April	1999	
Porto Alegre International Marathon	Porto Alegre	Brazil	May	1983	
Rio de Janeiro Marathon	Rio de Janeiro	Brazil	June	1979	
Rosario Marathon	Rosario	Argentina	June	2002	
Santiago Marathon	Santiago	Chile	April	2007	
São Paulo International Marathon	São Paulo	Brazil	April	1995	
Space Marathon	Kourou	French Guiana	March	1991	
Stanley Marathon	Stanley	Falkland Islands	March	2006	
Viña del Mar Marathon	Viña del Mar	Chile	October	2013	

== By continent ==
- List of marathon races in Africa
- List of marathon races in Asia
- List of marathon races in Australia
- List of marathon races in Europe
- List of marathon races in North America

== See also ==
- IAAF Road Race Label Events
- World Marathon Majors
