= Big Five Marathon =

Marathon in South Africa

- Date: June
- Location: Entabeni Game Reserve, South Africa
- Event type: Road
- Distance: Marathon, Half marathon
- Established: 2005
- Organizer: Albatros Adventure Marathons
- Course records: Men's: 3:15:31 (2025) (Australia) Nedd Brockmann; Women's: 3:45:24 (2016) (Denmark) Anne-Sophie Eriksen
- Website: Big Five Marathon
- Participants: 195 (2024)

The Big Five Marathon is a marathon race situated on the savannahs of South Africa. The race gets its name from the famous animals of Africa referred to as The Big Five Game: lion, leopard, elephant, rhino and buffalo. The course of The Big Five Marathon runs through the private game reserve Entabeni in the Limpopo Province, situated between Johannesburg and the Kruger National Park. Even though the course runs directly through a lion territory, safety problems will not be an issue as the route is watched by helicopters and armed rangers. The course of the marathon is atypical for its magnificent savannah scenery among the wildlife of South Africa as well as for its toughness. Even though the marathon takes place in the wintertime, the sun can be brutal on the open savannahs. In addition to this, the marathon's loop course has a diffence in elevation of more than more than 540 m between the lowest and the highest points. In 2025, Nedd Brockmann completed the course in 3:15:31, beating the previous record held Johannes Oosthuizen since 2010, by 30 seconds.

== History ==
The Big Five Marathon was first held in 2005 and has since grown in popularity, attracting marathon runners from around the world. The race was established with the intention of offering a unique adventure marathon experience in the heart of the African wilderness, combining endurance sports with the thrill of proximity to wildlife.

== Past results ==
Key: Course record

Year	Men's winner	Time (h:m:s)	Women's winner	Time (h:m:s)
2005	Leif Vincentsen (DEN)	3:49:38	Pia Lyholm (DEN)	4:22:15
2006	Jan Petersen (RSA)	3:35:59	Lerato Letsheng (RSA)	4:47:01
2007	Jerry Spears (USA)	3:18:13	Lynn Biesheuvel (RSA)	4:17:31
2008	Hylton Dunn (RSA)	3:55:56	Heather White (CAN)	4:42:42
2009	Hylton Dunn (RSA)	3:30:06	Richelle Turner (AUS)	4:43:06
2010	Johannes Oosthuizen (RSA)	3:16:01	Melandie Jennett (RSA)	4:06:14
7th	Scott Campbell (GBR)	3:36:04	Inez-Anne Haagen (NED)	3:47:07
2012	Pierre Poulain (FRA)	3:48:18	Suzanne McKeen (AUS)	4:01:13
2013	Jan Havrán (CZE)	3:50:45	Jo Tebbu (AUS)	4:26:31
2014	Robert Loveridge (NZL)	3:23:37	Cory Newm (AUS)	4:12:57
2015	Shigemi Takayoshi (JPN)	3:24:52	Shannon Rahlves (USA)	4:03:33
2016	Justin Keane (AUS)	3:53:18	Anne-Sophie Eriksen (DEN)	3:45:24
2017	Frank Johans (DEN)	3:28:03	Corelien Klo (NED)	4:00:23
2018	Joan Pere Carbonell (ESP)	3:35:49	Sharon Ryder (AUS)	4:10:10
2019	Vincent Dussault (CAN)	3:40:13	Sarah Silber (RSA)	4:06:49
2020 event cancelled
2021	Christian Stuffer (ITA)	3:38:41	Birgit Klammer (ITA)	4:47:46
2022	Giordano Malossi (ITA)	4:12:14	Kristina Velichkova Nikolova (BUL)	4:11:32
2023	Rasmus Bugge Jensen (DEN)	4:21:13	Claudia A. Josephine Heijden (NED)	4:16:44
2024	Daley Van De Sande (NED)	4:01:14	Marelize Retief (RSA)	3:54:25
2025	Nedd Brockmann (AUS)	3:15:31	Nicky Booysen (RSA)	04:07:05
