= Taroko Gorge International Marathon =

Annual running race in Hualien, Taiwan

The Taroko Gorge Marathon is an annual marathon held in Taroko National Park in Hualien, Taiwan.

== Winners ==
=== Men ===
Year	Athlete	Country	Time
2009	James Cheruiyot Meli	Kenya	2:24:20
2010	蔣介文	Chinese Taipei	2:27:41
2011	Kogei Hosea Kipyego	Kenya	2:21:39
2019	蘇志濱	Chinese Taipei	2:38:48

=== Women ===
Year	Athlete	Country	Time
2009	Esther Wanjiku Mutuku	Kenya	2:53:24
2010	李筱瑜	Chinese Taipei	3:09:03
2011	Emily Chepkemoi Samoei	Kenya	2:52:36
2019	黃素娥	Chinese Taipei	3:04:44

== See also ==
- List of sporting events in Taiwan
- List of marathon races in Asia
