= Almaty Marathon =

Kazakhstan race

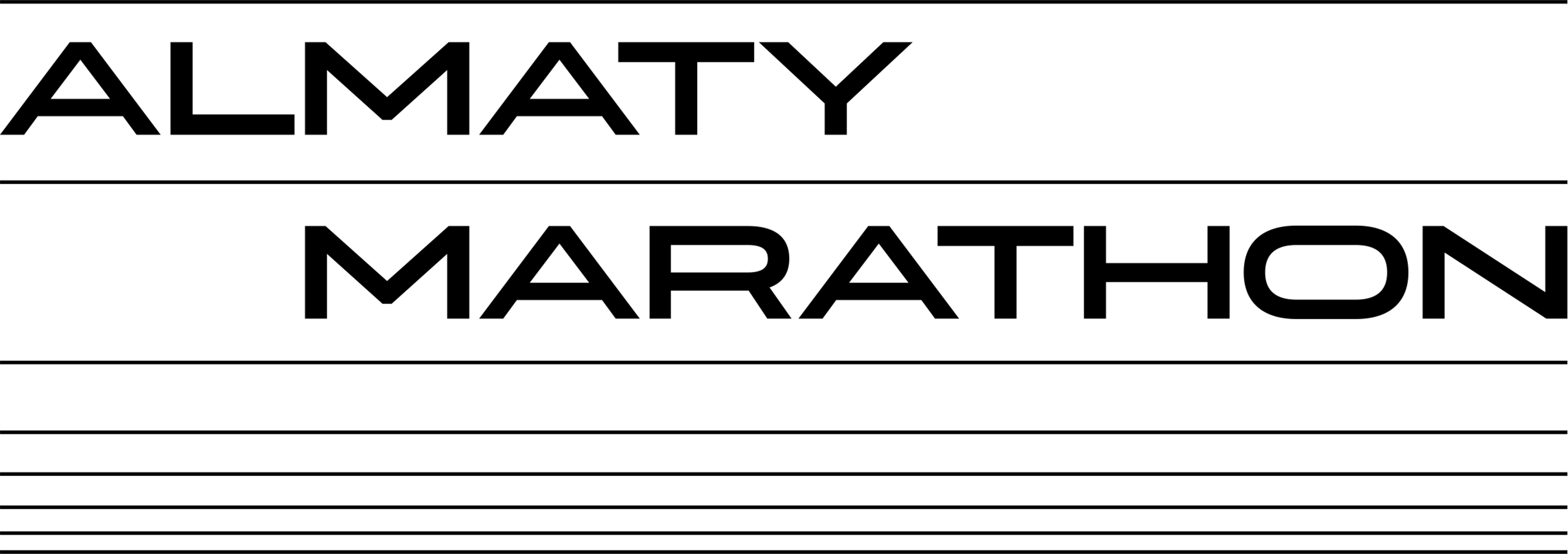
- Almaty Marathon logo
- Date: Last Sunday in September
- Location: Almaty, Kazakhstan
- Event type: Road
- Distance: Marathon; 41.195 kilometres (25.597 mi)
- Primary sponsor: Kaspi.kz
- Established: 2012, 14 years ago
- Website: www.almaty-marathon.kz/en
- 2026 Almaty Marathon

The Almaty Marathon is a yearly marathon that takes place on the last Sunday in September in Almaty, Kazakhstan. The Marathon is the largest sporting event in Central Asia and has been a part of AIMS International Association since 2013. The Almaty Marathon courses have been certified as per AIMS and IAAF rules and rated with B category, but the world records are not noted there due to elevation difference that does not correspond to IAAF requirements.

As of 2025, the Almaty Marathon includes five formats:

- Traditional Marathon (42 km 195 m) for participants aged 18 and over;
- Half Marathon (21 km 97.5 m) for participants aged 18 and over;
- Companion Run (10 km) for participants aged 15 and over;
- Nordic Walking (10 km) for participants aged 15 and over;
- Ekiden Corporate Relay Race (42 km 195 m) for teams of 6 people aged 16 and over.

== Race Route ==
Before 2017 and including this year, the competition in each of the formats started in First President Park and at Nurly Tau Business Center (children distance), and it finished at Central Stadium of Almaty. Courses certification was updated in 2018, and the race route was changed. Start and finish lines were moved to one site — Republic Square. During the Marathon, a number of streets in Almaty are closed. In that way, starting from 2018, the Marathon race route has run through all the city: along Nazarbayev Avenue (from Satbayev street to Al-Farabi Avenue), northern Al-Farabi, Sain street (from Al-Farabi to Abai Avenue), Abai Avenue (from Sain to Baitursynov street) and Satbayev (from Baitursynov street to Nazarbayev Avenue).

== Organizers ==
The competition organizers are “Courage to Be the First” Corporate Fund, KRIDA Fitness Club and Shakhmardan Yessenov Foundation, which is also a founder of the Almaty Marathon.

The idea of organizing a marathon in Almaty was conceived in 2012, when KRIDA Fitness Club (previously known as World Class Almaty) decided to celebrate an anniversary of its foundation. And the idea of a charity marathon came from entrepreneurs Galimzhan Yessenov and Aizhan Yessim. Since then the Marathon has been supported by various private organizations and Almaty city Akimat particularly.

== Declared Goals ==
The Almaty Marathon's mission is to support the nation's health improvement. The main organizer, “Courage to Be the First” CF, aims at organizing bright and huge sporting events, popularizing activity and corresponding to the highest international standards. When organizing the events, the Foundation sticks to 7 basic principles:

- runners’ safety;
- environment inclusiveness and availability to everyone, not depending on gender, age, physical abilities, running experience, and other special features;
- social responsibility through charity projects;
- innovations in the approach towards organization and in improvement of participants’ experience;
- environmental friendliness and care;
- globalization, large-scale involvement and a sense of belonging to community;

Annually, a portion of financial means from entry fees goes to creation of sports infrastructure and healthcare delivery to children with disabilities and special needs. Making sport more available is an essential part of social responsibility of “Courage to Be the First” Fund.

== History ==
The Almaty Marathon has become one of the first charity marathons that started collecting means for some social projects. The first Almaty Marathon took place on 27 May 2012 named as “Charity Marathon – Courage to Be the First” and gathered around 2,500 runners while only 500 were stated. The means raised during the Marathon went to a program providing support and rehabilitation to children with ICP (infantile cerebral paralysis). The total amount of charity support was KZT 292,500.

April 28, 2013. The 2nd Almaty Marathon gathered 5,000 participants. It was the year when the tradition of holding the Marathon on the last Sunday in April was approved. The money collected was sent to support construction of a mini aquatorium in Ardi Rehabilitation Center to provide rehabilitation to children with ICP and arrange remedial swimming sessions. The total amount of charity support was KZT 2,752,000.

April 20, 2014. The 3rd Almaty Marathon brought together 10,000 people, and the total amount of donations collected was 10,000,000 tenge. The Marathon charity recipient was Miloserdiye Voluntary Society that collects support for children suffering from oncology disease. The funds raised were sent to a family of 3-year-old Darina Lik. Being the prime sponsor, Astana Motors Company also gave an ambulance vehicle to the Oncology Department of R&D Institute of Pediatrics and Pediatric Surgery in Almaty.

April 26, 2015. The 4th marathon was completed by 15,000 participants from more than 40 countries worldwide. The funds raised were used by the Almaty Marathon organizers to build a modern stadium for Boarding School No.9 in Almaty, a special-purposed educational institution for children with severe speech and language disorder. The total amount of charity support was KZT 7,828,600. 72 people became prize winners of the Marathon (including 27 marathon runners among 9 age categories).

April 24, 2016. The 5th Almaty Marathon had 13,000 participants. 13 thousand people participated in there. KZT 12,295,000 collected during the Marathon was used to procure four units for locomotor apparatus recovery: KORVIT support plantar load simulators and IMITRON walking simulators.

April 23, 2017. More than 13,000 people from 42 countries officially registered for the 6th Almaty Marathon. The number of main formats were extended to six. The Foundation sent KZT 13,028,500 from the entry fees to the projects for more than 1,500 children with special needs from 6 special-purposed institutions.

April 22, 2018. The 7th Almaty Marathon took place on a newly updated route. 14 thousand people toed the starting line. A portion of means from the entry fees was applied towards building sports grounds and playgrounds in the first hospice for children with oncology diseases called “I am with you”, a regional boarding school for children with vision disorders in Yessik town, and a special-purposed (corrective) boarding school No. 6 for children with intellectual development disabilities. The total amount of charity support raised was KZT 16,380,500.

April 21, 2019. The 8th Almaty Marathon saw a record-breaking 17,000 runners from 53 countries worldwide. That year, Ekiden category engaged 113 teams, and the Almaty Marathon course set the record since 2012, both among men and women. Zikrillo Mamatkulov (Uzbekistan) covered the distance for 2 hours 28 minutes 34 seconds, and Alexandra Kalanova (Russia) did it for 2 hours 42 minutes 44 seconds. The participants also included some applicants to set the Guinness records. Thus, an amateur athlete from Poland, a traveler Wojciech Macznik aimed to beat the Guinness world record with an application “Maximum number of marathons completed in different countries in one year”. He has already completed 35 marathons since August 2018. The second potential record breaker was Alistair Kealty from Australia. His goal is to complete 52 marathons in 52 countries in the world setting a record in each one.

The Almaty Marathon 2019 collected KZT 26,000,000 for charity. The Foundation applied it towards some projects for the following organizations:

- Almaty regional boarding school No.15 for children from low-income families (sports ground construction);
- Military and Patriotic Club of Young Servicemen at Kirov Cruiser holding the Order of the Red Banner (climbing wall construction);
- City program “Adaptive skiing and snowboarding for children with ASD (autism spectrum disorder) and other developmental challenges in high-altitude environments”, implemented by Pioneer Concept Private Foundation (multipurpose sports ground construction).

April 19, 2020. The 9th Almaty Marathon was canceled due to the spread of the Covid-19 virus and the pandemic declared by the WHO. The plan was to gather around 18 thousand participants from different countries from all over the world. Despite the cancelation of the Almaty Marathon 2020, charity goals declared in the end of 2019 amounting to KZT 30,000,000 were implemented as planned:

- Kenes Private Association of People with Disabilities, Center for social and labor recovery (fully-equipped playground),
- Regional special-purposed boarding school for children with intellectual disorders in Yessik town (football pitch construction),
- SOS Children's Village Almaty Non-State Educational Establishment (workout ground construction).
- Amaliya Abilitation Center specializing on children with developmental challenges (equipment for sensory integration).
- Nur Foster Home in Talgar town (sports ground construction).

September 26, 2021. The 10th anniversary Almaty Marathon gathered 8,000 participants. Due to unfavorable epidemiologic conditions, the Marathon moved from April to September for the first time ever. The organizers and the participants observed safety measures in the pandemic conditions. KZT 40,000,000 raised with the help of the Almaty Marathon 2021 was spent on some projects of three organizations:

- Kovcheg Institution (multipurpose ground construction (football, volleyball, streetball),
- Center of Support to Children from Deprived Backgrounds Municipal Public Institution (workout ground),
- LA-155/6 Institution Republic State Institution (football ground).

September 25, 2022. The 11th Almaty Marathon, under the slogan "Join Us," was completed by approximately 12,000 participants from 30 countries. That year, the winners of marathon and half marathon distances set absolute records in the course. Kazakhstani Shedrak Koyech ran 42.2 kilometers for 2 hours 21 minutes 27 seconds. And Rinas Akhmadeyev from Tatarstan (1 hour 2 minutes 54 seconds) and Sardana Trofimova from Kyrgyzstan (1 hour 12 minutes 49 seconds) set the records at the distance of 21.1 kilometers. The collected amount of KZT 45,000,000 was used to implement some projects in 5 institutions:

- Workout grounds at a boarding school for children with intellectual disorders in Kaskelen town and at Almaty regional boarding school of sanatory type in Talgar town,
- A modern football pitch in Solnyshko Foster Home Private Institution,
- Innovative means for development of children with ICP in Rehab Team Rehabilitation Center (powered treadmill with handrails, electrically driven children standing frame assisting children to learn to walk and leg function recovery, ADELI medical loading suit, ATLANT pressure suit, as well as SWASH unit for pelvic section and pelvic limbs (Orthesis),
- Flying Start racing Wheelchairs for “Maxim's eleven” team to popularize mobility-impaired people's participation in sporting events.

October 1, 2023. The 12th Almaty Marathon brought together 14,000 runners from 50 countries worldwide. The first RoK 10 km Running Championship was held during the Marathon among the war veterans. In addition, Kazakhstan record was set as relates to the biggest “Nordics” mass start. The Almaty Marathon 2023 gave the record-breaking amount of KZT 65,500,000 from the entry fees to some projects of 8 charity recipients:

- Senim Social Services Center Municipal Public Institution (sports equipment),
- Center of Support to Children from Deprived Backgrounds Municipal Public Institution (football stadium),
- Ak zhol-M Non-Governmental Foundation (furniture to the Rehabilitation Center for children with special needs),
- Meiyrym Rehabilitation Center for physically challenged children and teenagers Private Foundation (MyWay elliptical trainer walkers),
- Amanat Social Foster Home and Ana amanaty boarding school for girls (multifunctional sports grounds),
- Athletic Facilities Directorate for Almaty city LLP (workout complex at the western field of the Central Stadium of the city),
- AVA Center Rostok LLP (special-purposed rehabilitation equipment for children with autism and speech and language disorder).

September 29, 2024. The 13th Almaty Marathon saw 15,000 athletes from 58 countries. The organizer team emphasized the environmental footprint after the event withdrawing from disposable structures and having used biodegradable materials. The event partner network expanded. The Almaty Marathon 2024 raised KZT 106,241,284 for charity purposes.

In addition, “Courage to Be the First” CF holds a range of season and themed race runs every year — they are preparative starts for the Almaty Marathon. The Marathon geography expands as well, and today the Foundation popularizes races of various scales in Astana, Turkestan, and other cities and towns.

== Results ==
Marathon (men) — overall ranking
Year	1 place	2 place	3 place
2013	Almat Imashev 2:30:40	Amir Baitukanov	Georgiy Sheyko
2014	Almat Imashev 02:36:21	Issa Nazarbayev 02:44:49	Amir Baitukanov 02:48:30
2015	Andrey Leymenov 02:35:51	Georgiy Sheyko	Almat Imashev
2016	Aidyn Kassen 02:42:58	Amir Baitukanov 02:50:04	Sergey Yakovlev 02:52:20
2017	Nikolay Grigorov 02:30:09	Amir Baitukanov 02:33:11	Aidyn Kassen 02:35:52
2018	Mikhail Krassilov 02:32:58	Nikolay Grigorov 02:37:01	Ortyk Ramazonov 02:39:04
2019	Zikrillo Mamatkulov 02:28:34	Amir Baitukanov 02:34:49	Alexey Shirshov 02:34:57
2021	Islam Amangos 02:41:36	Aman Nurkeldi 02:49:41	Grigoriy Savva 02:52:06
2022	Sherdak Koyech 02:21:27	Shoxrux Davlatov 02:24:18	Daniyar Ormangali 02:24:36
2023	Vladimir Chistyakov 02:24:43	Nodirbek Mutalipov 02:26:24	Zikrullo Mamatqulov 02:29:49
2024	Ilia Tiapkin 02:19:44	Begzod Boymatov 02:21:47	Jandos Narau 02:23:32

Marathon (women) — overall ranking
Year	1 place	2 place	3 place
2013	Mariya Kisselyova 2:45:37	Irina Smolnikova	Yekaterina Shatnaya
2014	Gulzhanat Zhanatbek 02:49:52	Yekaterina Shatnaya 03:35:12	Elizabeth Teysh 03:57:23
2015	Gulzhanat Zhanatbek 02:52:18	Polina Repina 03:29:43	Yekaterina Shatnaya 03:35:45
2016	Gulzhanat Zhanatbek 02:56:06	Katherine Simpson 03:23:03	Yekaterina Shatnaya 03:29:15
2017	Polina Repina 03:16:15	Alyona Uvarova 03:23:12	Mariya Kireyeva 03:23:15
2018	Dana Aidossova 03:04:50	Anastassiya Kolmagorova 03:34:59	Aida Yesterekova 03:39:18
2019	Alexandra Kalanova 02:42:44	Marina Khmelevskaya 02:45:44	Tamila Kuchkarova 03:08:17
2021	Dana Gussarova 03:00:47	Anastassiya Kolmagorova 03:27:46	Anastassiya Ilyassova 03:47:52
2022	Tatyana Neroznak 02:57:20	Diana Aidossova 03:04:43	Galina Yakusheva 03:19:28
2023	Kseniia Avdeeva 02:53:48	Yekaterina Vassilchenko 02:55:07	Anastassiya Slepneva 02:56:14
2024	Anastassiya Derkach 02:45:37	Kseniia Avdeeva 02:47:07	Yelena Tolstykh 02:50:15

== Links ==
- Almaty Marathon website
