= Palasia Hotel =

Hotel in Koror, Palau

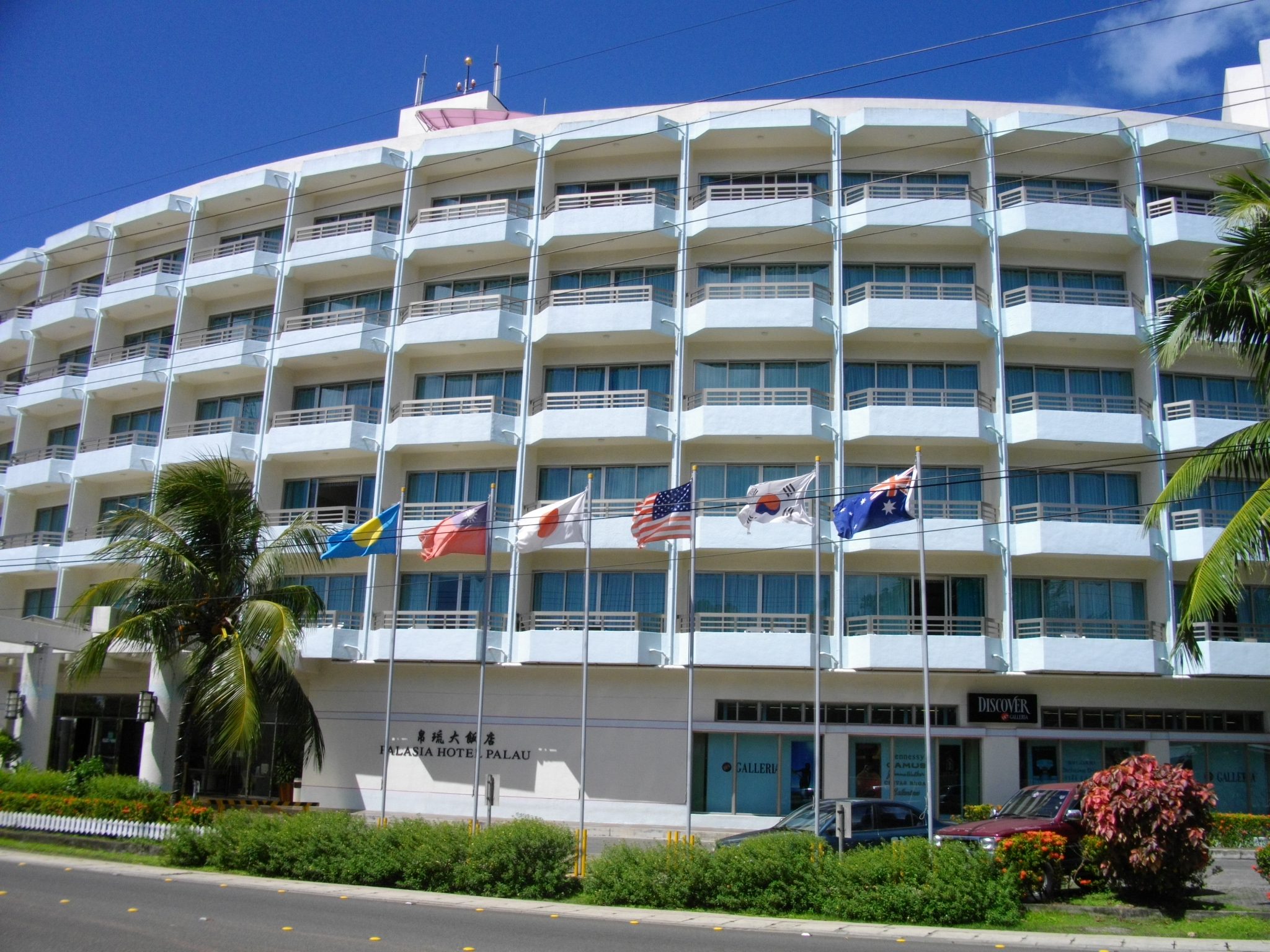

- Location within Palau

General information
- Location: Koror, Palau
- Coordinates: 7°20′35.9″N 134°28′48.7″E
- Opening: 24 August 1998

Technical details
- Floor count: 10

Website
- http://www.palasia-hotel.com/

Palasia Hotel is a hotel in Koror, Palau. It is the tallest building in Palau with 10 floors and a height of around 36m. The building cost $1 million to build and was funded by Taiwan.

== History ==
In January 1995, Chen Ding-nan, president of the Asia-Pacific section of the Kuomintang’s (KMT's) Central Investment Holdings Company, visited Palau. By August 1995, Chen had made an agreement with Palauan politician Alan Seid to build the Palasia Hotel. Taiwan held 80 percent ownership and Palau held 20 percent. Due to the problems associated with property purchases by foreigners the hotel was built on Seid's land. The hotel opened on 24 August 1998.

The Taiwanese stake in the Palasia Hotel is not held by the government of Taiwan but by the KMT political party in its private capacity. In the democratic era this has made it a subject of controversy with an investigation by the Ill-gotten Party Assets Settlement Committee.

In 2018 the Taiwanese government blocked the KMT investment vehicle which owns the hotel from selling it.

== See also ==
- Palau–Taiwan relations
