= Traralgon Marathon =

Annual race in Australia held since 1968

- Date: usually June
- Location: Traralgon, Victoria, Australia
- Event type: Road
- Distance: Marathon
- Established: 1968 (58 years ago)
- Website: http://www.traralgonharriers.org.au
- Participants: 13 finishers (2020); 95 finishers (2019)

The Traralgon Marathon is an annual marathon road running event held in Traralgon, Victoria, Australia. It has been held every year since 1968, and is the "oldest continuously run marathon in Australia" as of 2020. The race is organised by the Traralgon Harriers Athletic Club.

== History ==
External image
- Runners at inaugural race in 1968

The inaugural race was held on 24 August 1968 as the first marathon in the "Victorian Country Marathon" series to be held in Traralgon. A total of 18 runners finished out of an initial field of 34.

In 1978, Patricia Cooper became the first woman to run the Traralgon Marathon. She had only taken up running the year before, and completed the race with a finish time of 3:41:29.

The 2020 edition of the race was postponed due to the coronavirus pandemic, but was eventually held on 29 November 2020. Because of the pandemic, the course was changed, and contenders were limited to members of the Traralgon Harriers Athletic Club. A total of 13 runners finished the marathon that year.

== Course ==
The course has changed a number of times but has been run in an out and back format starting from the Traralgon Recreation Reserve & Showgrounds out to Toongabbie for many years, moving away from the main road onto the rail trail in 2016 but still essentially following the same route.

== Winners ==
Ed.	Year	Men's Winner	Time	Women's Winner	Time	Rf.
1	1968	Barry Sawyer	2:26:53.6	uncontested		
2	1969	Ian Wheeler	2:27:49	uncontested		
3	1970	Derek Clayton	2:13:39	uncontested		
4	1971	John Bermingham	2:32:08	uncontested		
5	1972	Phil Lear	2:28:38	uncontested		
6	1973	Bob Guthrie	2:28:05	uncontested		
7	1974	Bob Guthrie	2:28:34	uncontested		
8	1975	Andrew Hill	2:26:16	uncontested		
9	1976	Phil Lear	2:44:10	uncontested		
10	1977	Robert Jamieson	2:40:26	uncontested		
11	1978	Matthew Ryan	2:35:01	Patricia Cooper	3:41:29	
12	1979	Martin Thompson	2:33:44	Linda Thompson	3:23:32	
13	1980	Carl Stevenson	2:30:29	Fay Tomholt	3:48:28	
14	1981	Brian Whinnen	2:26:28	Anne Wilson	3:51:25	
15	1982	Jim Seymon	2:33:18	Iris Cook	3:02:40	
16	1983	David Potts	2:30:28	Linda Thompson	3:09:36	
17	1984	John Duck	2:27:06	Georgann Petersen	3:09:16	
18	1985	Wayne Kelb	2:32:49			
19	1986	John Brennan	2:34:00	Mary Edwards	2:56:06	
20	1987	Rob Gilfillen	2:27:18	Mary Edwards	3:07:52	
21	1988	Rob Gilfillen	2:25:47	Mary Edwards	2:52:59	
22	1989	Rob Gilfillen	2:27:57	Mary Edwards	3:08:45	
23	1990	Mark Sinclair	2:34:27	Jan Brimacombe	3:13:33	
24	1991	Morgan Tucker	2:30:45	Shirley Kelly	3:06:46	
25	1992	Morgan Tucker	2:23:56	Linda Meadows	2:53:38	
26	1993	Morgan Tucker	2:32:45	Linda Christian	2:53:02	
27	1994	Morgan Tucker	2:30:55	Sydney Martin	3:25:09	
28	1995	Max Carson	2:54:26	Sydney Martin	3:30:59	
29	1996	Darren Benson	2:33:19	Lee Graham	3:23:22	
30	1997	Nenet Susa	2:35:17	Sandra Timmer-Arends	3:13:53	
31	1998	Darrel Cross	2:45:43	Shirley Young	3:59:29	
32	1999	Aaron Fuller	2:47:56	Sandra Timmer-Arends	2:55:16	
33	2000	Ian Cornthwaite	2:35:09	June Petrie	3:04:20	
34	2001	John MacKenzie	2:33:51	Rachael Stewart	3:42:11	
35	2002	John MacKenzie	2:34:00	Jodie Healey	3:29:08	
36	2003	Steve Quirk	2:52:08	Jodie Healey	3:27:48	
37	2004	Mike Wheatley	2:42:59	Sandra Timmer-Arends	3:00:06	
38	2005	David Meade	2:27:49	Jodie Healey	3:12:23	
39	2006	Tim Cochrane	2:46:37	Sandra Timmer-Arends	3:12:21	
40	2007	Tim Cochrane	2:45:34	Sandra Timmer-Arends	3:25:19	
41	2008	John MacKenzie	2:40:34	Sandra Timmer-Arends	3:22:32	
42	2009	John MacKenzie	2:34:24	Sandra Timmer-Arends	3:22:01	
43	2010	John MacKenzie	2:36:18	Jennifer Northe	3:27:39	
44	2011	John MacKenzie	2:42:18	Kylie Murray	2:58:13	
45	2012	John MacKenzie	2:41:54	Athene Chariot	3:04:48	
46	2013	Cameron Hall	2:39:55	Athene Chariot	3:15:43	
47	2014	Dion Finocchiaro	2:33:43	Katherine Macmillan	3:07:08	
48	2015	Dion Finocchiaro	2:31:19	Katherine Macmillan	3:17:25	
49	2016	James Vince	2:50:11	Sarah Franks	3:21:55	
50	2017	Ryan Wissmer	2:33:46	Kylie-Anne Richards	3:17:18	
51	2018	James Vince	2:42:37	Charlotte Wildblood	3:25:19	
52	2019	John Dutton	2:34:42	Rebecca Dale	3:27:53	
53	2020	Zackary Beasley	2:40:28	Narelle Crozier	3:14:17	
54	2021	Travis Boyle	2:29:49	Narelle Crozier	2:56:08	
55	2022	Zackary Beasley	2:42:18	Narelle Crozier	2:58:33	
56	2023	Hamish Cropper	2:42:19	Jody Daff	3:46:12	
