= Entabeni Game Reserve =

Private reserve in Limpopo, South Africa

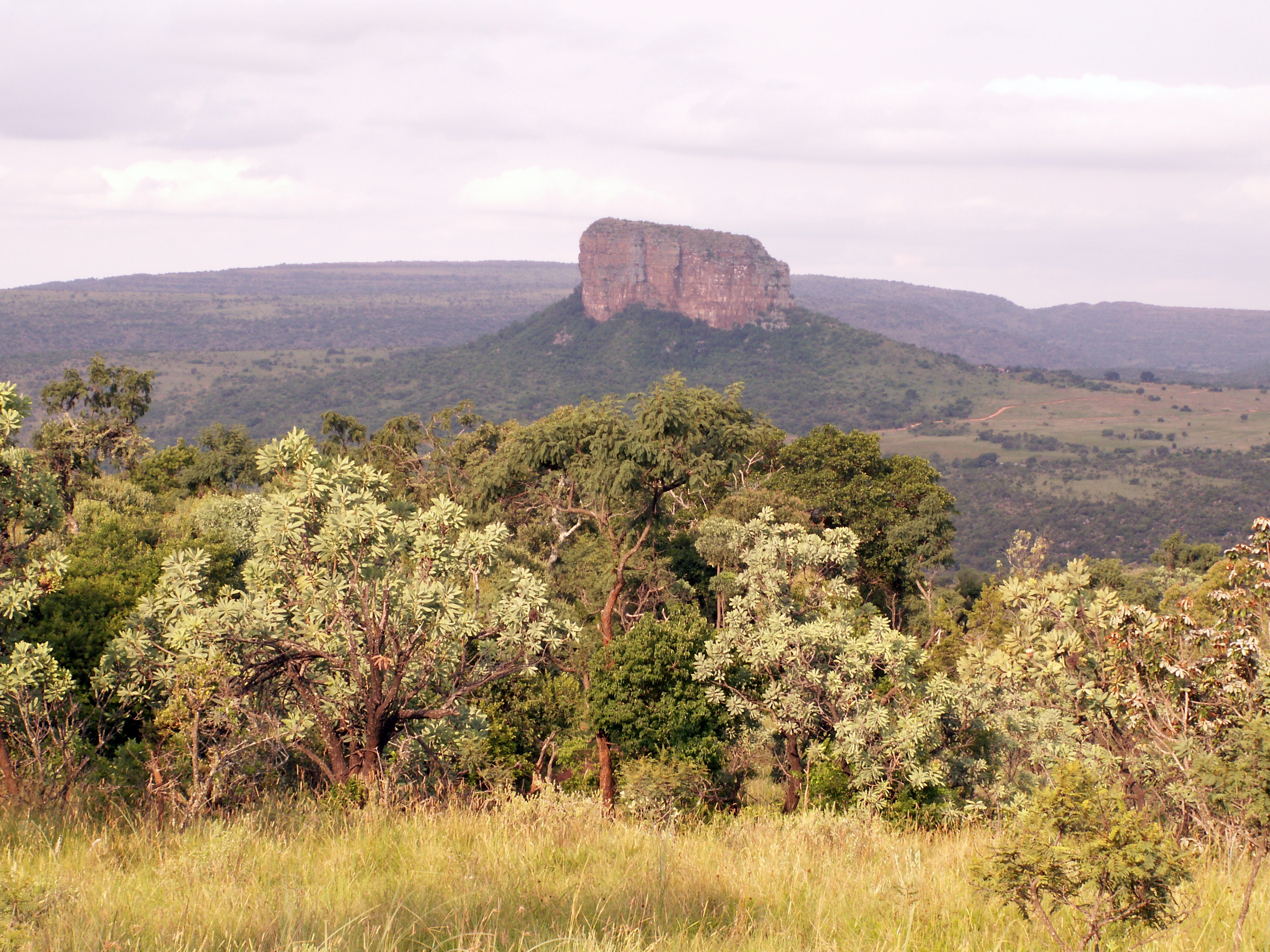

- Location within Limpopo
- Location: Limpopo Province, South Africa
- Coordinates: 24.2044°S 28.64°E
- Area: 220 km^{2} (85 mi^{2})

The Entabeni Game Reserve, Entabeni means 'place of the mountain', is a 220 km^{2} (85 mi^{2}) private reserve situated in the Waterberg in Limpopo Province in northern South Africa. The Entabeni Reserve is popular for safari trips because of the opportunity to see big game and a variety of birds and antelope species, as well as its scenery, and the fact that it is in a malaria-free zone. The reserve is home to lion, African bush elephant, South African giraffe, African leopard, South African cheetah, warthog, African buffalo, hippopotamus and other safari animals in a variety of habitats.

Summer in Entabeni is from November to March with temperatures between 15 and 40 °C (59 and 104 °F). Winter temperatures vary from −5 to 25 °C (23 to 77 °F) (April–October).

The reserve is owned and operated by Legend Lodges.

Also situated on the property is the Entabeni Nature Guide Training school.
