= List of ambassadors of the Republic of China to Palau =

Coordinates: 7.344329°N 134.497029°E

Taiwanese Ambassador to Palau
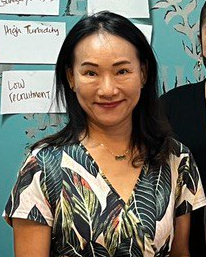
- Incumbent; Jessica C. Lee since 18 October 2021
- Inaugural holder: Clark K. H. Chen
- Formation: 1 May 2000; 26 years ago

The Taiwanese Ambassador to Palau is the official representative of the Republic of China to the Republic of Palau.

== List of representatives ==
Diplomatic agrément/Diplomatic accreditation	Ambassador	Chinese language zh:中華民國駐帛琉大使列表	Observations	List of premiers of the Republic of China	President of Palau	Term end
May 1, 2000	Clark K. H. Chen	陈国璜		Tang Fei	Kuniwo Nakamura	December 1, 2006
December 1, 2006	de:Lee Matthew Shieh-Ming	李世明		Su Tseng-chang	Tommy Remengesau	August 1, 2008
August 1, 2008	Maggie Taiching Tien	田台清		Liu Chao-shiuan	Tommy Remengesau	January 1, 2015
January 1, 2015	Harry Ho-Jen Tseng	曾厚仁		Mao Chi-kuo	Tommy Remengesau	May 1, 2016
August 1, 2016	Michael Y. K. Tseng	曾永光		Lin Chuan	Tommy Remengesau	2021
October 18, 2021	Jessica C. Lee	黎倩儀		Su Tseng-chang	Surangel Whipps Jr.	
