= Belau Omal Marathon =

Marathon held in Palau

- Date: September
- Location: Koror, Palau
- Event type: Road
- Distance: Marathon
- Established: 2023 (3 years ago)
- Course records: Men's: 2:43:06 (2024) (Kenya) Japhet Rono; Women's: 3:05:41 (2024) (Kenya) Jane Wanjiru
- Website: Belau Omal Marathon

The Belau Omal Marathon is an annual marathon in Palau. The inaugural edition of the race was held on 4 June 2023.

== History ==
As a program to stimulate tourism and strengthen Palau–Taiwan relations, coordination and preparation for the Belau Omal Marathon began in 2019. Due to the COVID-19 pandemic, the event was delayed until 2023. In February 2023, Palauan officials visited Kinmen to observe its 23rd marathon event. Taiwanese deputy foreign minister Roy Chun Lee announced in Taipei that Taiwan and Palau were jointly hosting the Belau Omal Marathon. Attendees of the news conference included Palauan vice president Uduch Sengebau Senior.

As part of the initial campaign to promote the race, Taiwanese athletes such as former tennis player Lu Yen-hsun and former baseball player Tsao Chun-yang, as well as legislators, entered the race.

The inaugural race was held on 4 June and drew about 600 runners from around the world. It was Palau's first internationally certified marathon. Finn runner Lauri Raunio won the men's segment with a winning time of 03:08:04 in the men's segment, and Taiwanese Liu Su-ya (劉素雅) finished first in the women's segment with a time of 03:35:03.

Ahead of the 2024 race in September, the Belau Omal Marathon received its course certification as a World Athletics qualifying race. Palauan and Northern Marianas officials signed a memorandum of understanding to co-promote the Belau Omal Marathon and the Saipan Marathon.

== Past winners ==
Key: Course record

Edition	Year	Men's winner	Time (h:m:s)	Women's winner	Time (h:m:s)
1st	2023	Lauri Raunio (FIN)	3:08:04	Liu Su-ya (TWN)	3:35:03
2nd	2024	Japhet Rono (KEN)	2:43:06	Jane Wanjiru (KEN)	3:05:41

== See also ==
- Palau Marathon
