= Nurly Tau Business Center =

- «Нұрлы Тау» бизнес орталығы
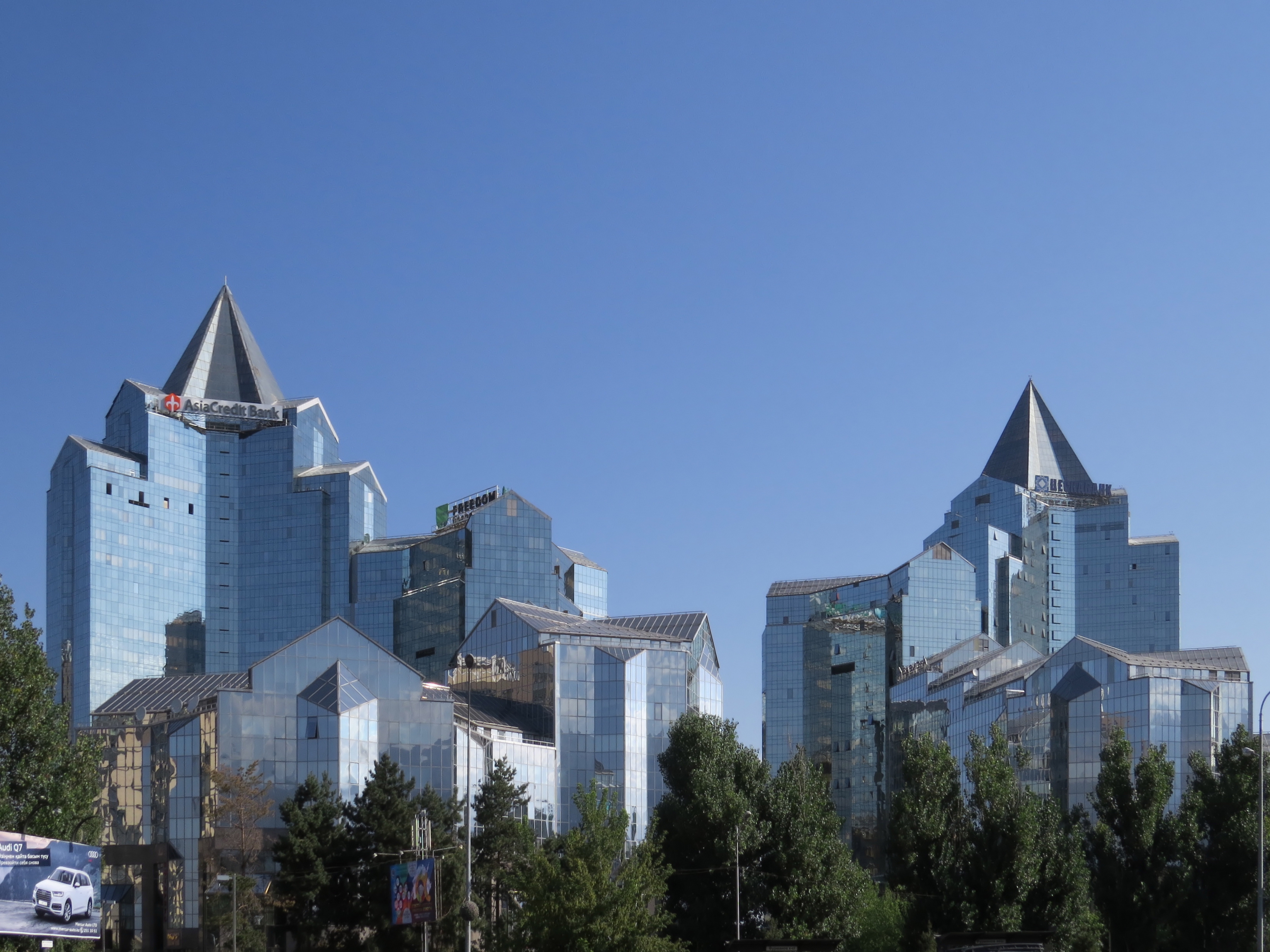
- Nurly Tau Business Center, Almaty

- Location within Kazakhstan
- Alternative names: Nurly Tau

General information
- Status: Completed
- Type: Mixed-use
- Architectural style: Neomodern
- Location: 81 Al-Farabi Avenue, Almaty, Kazakhstan
- Coordinates: 43°13′55″N 76°57′12″E
- Current tenants: Halyk Bank, ATF Bank, Mitsubishi Corporation, and other Kazakh and international firms
- Construction started: 2004
- Completed: 2014
- Opened: 2008–2014 (phased opening)

Height
- Height: 109 m

Technical details
- Structural system: Seismic-resistant frame (earthquake-proof up to magnitude 8)
- Material: Reinforced concrete, glass, steel
- Floor count: 28
- Floor area: 300,000 m²
- Lifts/elevators: Multiple (exact number not publicly reported)
- Grounds: 8 ha

Design and construction
- Architects: S. Baimagambetov, T. Yeraliyev, A. Valikhanov
- Developer: Bazis-A
- Engineer: A. Tatygulov, M. Yerkenov, V. Okonechnikov, M. Weinstein
- Awards: Grand Prize of the Union of Architects of Kazakhstan

Other information
- Parking: Multi-level underground (1 parking space per 80 m² of area)

Website
- nurlytau.kz

The Nurly Tau Business Center (Kazakh: «Нұрлы Тау» бизнес орталығы, romanized: “Nūrly Tau“ biznes ortalyğy; Russian: Бизнес-центр «Нурлы Тау», romanized: Biznes-tsentr «Nurly Tau»), or simply Nurly Tau (Kazakh: Нұрлы тау, lit. 'Radiant Mountain') is a mixed-use business and residential complex in the southeast of Almaty, Kazakhstan.

== History ==
The Nurly Tau project was conceived in the early 2000s as one of the first large-scale multifunctional business complexes in Almaty. The project was developed by the KAZGOR Design Academy, with chief architects Serik Baimagambetov, T. Yeraliyev, and A. Valikhanov, together with engineers A. Tatygulov, M. Yerkenov, V. Okonechnikov, and M. Weinstein. The designers aimed to create a modern urban space with developed infrastructure, combining Asian and European cultural motifs while responding to the natural and climatic conditions of Almaty.

The architectural concept drew inspiration from the Zailiysky Alatau mountains, with the name nurly tau (radiant mountain in Kazakh) symbolizing this connection. The towers were designed with glass facades using low-emission coatings to reduce energy loss, and the complex was equipped with multi-level underground parking and adaptable interior spaces intended for offices, conference halls, and exhibitions. In 2005, Kazakhstan’s major construction company Bazis-A was commissioned to implement the project. During the design phase, specialists in earthquake safety were consulted, and simulations indicated that the structures would withstand seismic shocks of up to magnitude 8 on the Richter scale.

Construction began in 2004, with phased completion between 2008 and 2014.

== Architecture and layout ==
The Nurly Tau complex occupies a site of approximately eight hectares in southeastern Almaty, designed as a "city within a city" integrating residential, commercial, and recreational components. Residential buildings around the central esplanade offer apartments ranging from 120 to 214 m², with a total residential area of 180,000 m². The complex includes above-ground guest parking and a two-level underground parking structure, providing one parking space for every 80 m² of area.

The office component is the largest in Almaty’s business hubs, comprising approximately 130,000 m², including a class A office segment of around 100,000 m². Office units range from 90 to 1,100 m², allowing for flexible tenancy and a high concentration of businesses in a single location.

The complex consists of four symmetrically arranged groups of buildings with varying heights, with a total area of roughly 300,000 m². Facilities are equipped with modern fire and security systems, uninterrupted power supply, climate control, air conditioning, ventilation, telecommunication systems, and high-speed Internet, in accordance with class A office standards.

The architectural concept reflects the surrounding Trans-Ili Alatau mountains, with glass facades using low-emission coatings to reduce energy loss. The tallest tower, Nurly Tau 1, rises to 109 metres with 28 floors, making it the second tallest building in Almaty.

== Use ==
The project was envisioned as a "city within a city", integrating offices, apartments, restaurants, retail space, and leisure facilities. Alongside numerous Kazakh firms, international companies have also established offices within the complex. Notable tenants have included Halyk Bank, ATF Bank, and Mitsubishi Corporation.

== Reception ==
Public and professional evaluations of Nurly Tau have been mixed. On the one hand, the ensemble received architectural recognition, including the Grand Prize of the Union of Architects of Kazakhstan. On the other, residents often derided its appearance, with some likening the towers to a "glass chicken coop". Critics also highlighted functional shortcomings: the open areas between buildings were considered underdeveloped and lacking in greenery; transport accessibility proved insufficient, with the complex contributing to traffic congestion along Al-Farabi Avenue and surrounding arteries; and despite the inclusion of parking, demand frequently outstripped supply.

Despite its high-gloss marketing and architectural ambition, Nurly Tau ultimately struggled to establish itself as a premier business district in Almaty. Market analysts observed that demand gravitated toward business centers with better central locations, parking, and transport links that the Nurly Tau complex lacked.

As of early 2024, a municipal auction to sell five unfinished floors within the complex failed to attract a single buyer, even after the price was slashed from 2.4 to 0.723 billion tenge.

== See also ==
- List of tallest buildings in Almaty
- Economy of Almaty
