= 2022 Liberia Marathon =

The Liberia Marathon is the sole official long-distance road race in Liberia which includes both local and international runners.

On August 21, 2022 more than 1400 runners took part in the Liberia Marathon 2022. The marathon featured a full marathon, a half marathon, a 10k race, and a 10k race for participants using wheelchairs and crutches. All races culminated at the Samuel Kanyon Doe Sports Complex. The event featured athletes from Liberia and participants from 15 countries beyond Liberia. Over 25% of runners were women. The marathon was organized by the Liberia Marathon Trust, an independent Liberian non-profit organization.

The vision aims to make road-running a crucial aspect of both professional and recreational sports in Liberia, in accordance with the Sports for Development Agenda. The mission entails providing road-running opportunities and events that meet international standards for Liberian professional athletes and the broader community. Additionally, it focuses on fostering developmental connections through sports and cultivating long-distance talent within Liberia.
