= Coal City Marathon =

Annual marathon in Enugu State, Nigeria

- Location: Enugu, Nigeria
- Event type: Road
- Distance: Marathon, half marathon
- Primary sponsor: Redbull Energy Drink, Three Crowns Milk, Kwese Cable Television, Ethiopian Airlines
- Established: 2018
- Organizer: Ndiokwelu Nzube
- Website: Coal City Marathon
- Participants: 1320 (2018)

The Coal City Marathon is an annual international event held in Enugu State, Nigeria.

== Overview ==
The Coal City Marathon held on 24 November 2018, was the first ever international half marathon to be held in the entire South-East Zone of Nigeria. A 21 Kilometer half marathon which started off from Michael Okpara Square, Independence Layout Enugu and ended at the Nnamdi Azikiwe Stadium along Ogui Road, Enugu. The event saw over 1,320 local and International runners from Kenya, Ethiopia and Cameroun.

== 2019 ==
The 2019 coal city marathon is scheduled to take place in November according to the Athletics Federation of Nigeria Tentative 2019 Programme and has been listed as one of the five upcoming races every Nigerian should look forward to in 2019.

== 2018 ==
The half marathon which is certified by the AFN (Athletics Federation of Nigeria) had the routes inspected and approved by the officials and saw three Nigerians and three Kenyans emerging as winners. The 2018 winner received 3,500 dollars as prize money while the first and second runners-up received 3,000 and 2,500 dollars respectively.

== Winners ==
Year	Position	Male Category	Time	Female Category	Time
2018	1st	Gideon Goyeto (NGA)	01:06:57	Nancy Jesang (KEN)	1.15:57
2018	2nd	Adamu Shehu (NGA)	1.07:39	Judith Cherono (KEN)	1.17:10
2018	3rd	Matthew Gocheke (KEN)	1.08:56	Deborah Pam (NGA)	1:19:32
