= Gaza Marathon =

Marathon race in Gaza, Palestine

- Date: May 2011, March 2012
- Location: Gaza Strip, Palestine
- Event type: Road
- Distance: Marathon
- Established: 2011/2012
- Course records: Men: 2:42:47 (2011); Nader al-Masri; Women: 4:45:00 (2011); Gemma Connell

The Gaza Marathon (Arabic: ماراثون غزة) was a marathon race in the Gaza Strip, Palestine organized by UNRWA to raise funds for the UNWRA Summer Games program for children in Gaza. In addition to the full marathon race (42.195 km, 26 miles 385 yards), there was also a half-marathon race and a 10 kilometers (6.21 mi) race, from Beit Hanoun in the north to Rafah in the south. Children run stages of between 1 kilometre (0.6 mi) to 4 kilometres (2.5 mi) in relays over the whole marathon course.

The event was held for the first time on May 5, 2011, attracting more than 1,500 participants living in Gaza.

On 1 March 2012, Gaza held its first and only international marathon, attracting nearly 2,200 children and more than 500 adult runners, including participants from countries such as the United States, Spain, and France, as well as several Olympic athletes. Women and girls also took part in the event, which included a final one-kilometre segment dedicated to participants with disabilities.

In 2013 the marathon was scheduled for April 10, but was cancelled following "the decision by the authorities in Gaza not to allow women to participate".

== Course and conditions ==
The course spans the entire Gaza Strip, from Beit Hanoun near the border with Israel in the northeast to Rafah, near the Egyptian border in the south. From Beit Hanoun the course runs west toward the Mediterranean coast, and then follows the coastal road southwest, parallel to the coast, before turning inland to Rafah. The route passes battered towns, refugee camps, the fishing harbor, the ruins of Yasser Arafat's former presidential compound, and the shells of other buildings hit in Israeli air strikes.

The course is mostly flat but conditions in May tend to be very hot. There are no road closures, and in addition to potholes, runners have to negotiate traffic, including donkey carts and vans.

The organizers work with the local security authorities, currently run by the Hamas government, to ensure the runners' safety and also have to consider local sensitivities regarding male and female athletes running side-by-side. Following the inaugural race in 2011, UNWRA spokesman Chris Gunness said, "The Israeli authorities have kept many things out of Gaza but we are trying to make sure that the one thing that can get through the blockade is fun. The marathon definitely achieved that not just for the competitors but for the thousands and thousands of onlookers who applauded every runner."

== 2011 race ==
The race started at sunrise, 6 a.m. on May 5, when the temperature had already reached 21 °C (70 °F).

About fifty runners started the course, with just nine runners completing the full distance. Of these, seven were Palestinian athletes training for the next year's Olympics. Six more ran the half marathon, and 150 runners from the Gaza Athletics Federation joined for the last stretch of 8 kilometers (5.0 mi). More than 1,000 schoolchildren took part in relays of between 1 kilometer (0.62 mi) and 4 kilometers (2.5 mi), and a group of around 100 women participated in a 10 kilometers (6.2 mi) walk.

The winner, with a time of 2:42:47, was Nader al-Masri, who competed for Palestine at the 2008 Beijing Olympics in the 5,000-meter race, and who was training for the 2012 Olympics in London. There were two international participants, both of them UNRWA employees running a marathon for the first time. One of them, Gemma Connell, was the only woman who ran the entire race. She finished with a time of 4 hours and forty-five minutes.

UNRWA organized the event as a fund-raiser for its Summer Games for Gaza school children. The goal was to raise one million US dollars for the Summer Games; UNRWA said the goal was exceeded.

== 2012 race ==
The 2012 Gaza Marathon, held on 1 March 2012, marked the first international Gaza Marathon and the second edition of the event organized by UNRWA. The event brought together nearly 2,200 children running relays and over 500 adult participants, including professional athletes, amateur runners from countries such as the United States, Spain, France, etc as well two Olympic hopefuls: Nader Al Masri, who ran the full marathon, and Bahaa al-Farra, who competed in the 10-kilometre race. Women and girls took part in the event, which also featured a final one-kilometre segment dedicated to participants with disabilities.

The event was organized to raise funds and awareness for the UNRWA Summer Games program, which provided recreational and cultural activities for approximately 250,000 children in Gaza. Organizers described the marathon as an opportunity to promote community engagement and highlight the ability to host a large-scale public sporting event in the region. “Today is a big day for the residents of the Gaza Strip,” said Adnan Abu Hasna, UNRWA spokesperson: “It is a message to the world that Gaza is like Jerusalem and Tel Aviv and Cairo, and it is possible to organize such a big and huge marathon here.”

The event took place despite challenging conditions, including strong winds and sandstorms. “On a day of such strong winds, it was inspiring to see so many kids, wearing their T-shirts, trainers, and smiles, ready to participate in the very first international marathon,” said Cátia Lopes, the event organiser. Palestinian athlete Nader al-Masri won the marathon for the second consecutive year. UNRWA emphasized the marathon’s symbolic role in highlighting the ongoing humanitarian crisis under the Israeli blockade, while promoting the right of children to play, move freely, and experience joy.
