= Shahmardan Yesenov =

Kazakhstani politician (1927–1994)

Shakhmardan Yessenov
- Шаһмардан Есенұлы Есенов

Minister of Geology of the Kazakh SSR
- In office 1974–1978
- Preceded by: Alexander Sitko
- Succeeded by: Saken Chakabaev

Chairman of the Supreme Council of the Kazakh SSR
- In office 11 April 1967 – 13 August 1974
- Preceded by: Askar Zakarin
- Succeeded by: Gabit Musirepov

Minister of Geology of the Kazakh SSR
- In office 1961–1965

Personal details
- Born: August 5, 1927 (age 99) Bala Bi village, Shieli District, Qyzylorda Region, Kazakh ASSR, USSR
- Died: August 24, 1994 (aged 67)
- Party: CPSU
- Education: Satbayev University
- Occupation: Geologist
- Website: yessenovfoundation.org

Shakhmardan Yessenov (August 5, 1927, Bala-Bi village, Shieli District, Qyzylorda Region – August 24, 1994, Almaty) was a Kazakhstani scientist and statesman, Minister of Geology of the Kazakh SSR (1961–1967, 1974–1978), Academician of the KazSSR Academy of Sciences (1967), President of the KazSSR Academy of Sciences (1967–1974), Doctor of Geology and Mineralogy (1970).

== Biography ==
Shakhmardan Yessenov was born in the village of Bala Bi (Shieli District, Qyzylorda Region) on August 5, 1927. He graduated from Qyzylorda Teacher Training College in 1944. In 1949 completed his training as a mining geological engineer at the Kazakh Institute of Mining and Metallurgy (now Satbayev National Technical University). During his 11 years of work in Jezkazgan, rose from a regular geologist to the Chief Geologist and Chief Engineer of Jezkazgan Comprehensive Geological Survey Expedition.

Yessenov's talents propelled his career and in 1960 he became Deputy Minister of Geology of the Kazakh SSR, and Minister the next year at the age of 33, thus becoming the youngest ever Minister in the USSR.

When large deposits of oil and gas were discovered in the Mangyshlak Peninsula in 1962, Khrushchev had the idea of handing the region over to Azerbaijan or Turkmenistan, citing republics substantial experience in oilfield development. Dinmukhamed Kunaev tasked Yessenov with ensuring Mangyshlak would remain a part of Kazakhstan. The issue was discussed at the joint session of the Presidium of the Supreme Soviet and the USSR Council of Ministers behind closed doors. Shakhmardan Yessenov, as the Minister of Geology of the Kazakh SSR, took the floor after Khrushchev's introductory speech and made a compelling case for the need to keep Mangyshlak Region within KazSSR, arguing that the republic had sufficient scientific and manufacturing capabilities to develop it. Kosygin, First Deputy Chairman of the USSR Council of Ministers, together with the majority of attendees supported Yessenov and voted in favor of preserving the status quo of Mangyshlak. This historic decision secured a very important part of Kazakhstan.

In 1965 Yessenov was appointed Deputy Chairman of the Kazakh SSR Council of Ministers to oversee heavy industries and development of resources portfolio for the key sectors of the USSR. In 1967, 39-year old Yessenov was elected an Academician and president of the Academy of Sciences of the Kazakh SSR, and was also appointed Director of the Institute of Geological Sciences named after Satbayev.

He defended his thesis in Moscow in 1970 and became a Doctor of Geology and Mineralogy and received his professorship the same year.

In 1972-1974 Shakhmardan Yessenov served as the Chair of KazSSR Committee on State Awards for Science and Technology and a Fellow of USSR Geographic Society.

In early 1974 Yessenov was again appointed the Minister of Geology of Kazakhstan until 1978 when he joined Kazakh Polytechnic Institute (now National Technical University) where he led the Dept. of Mineral Exploration Methods until his death.

Shakhmardan Yessenov died in August 1994, aged 67, after a protracted illness.

== Family ==
Spouse — Kamila Karabalaeva.

Children: 3 sons and a daughter. Shakhmardan's grandson is Galimzhan Yessenov, a Kazakhstani businessman.

== Key publications ==
- Geologiya, metodika poiskov i razvedki mestorozhdenij rodusit-asbesta; (Geology and Methods of Rhodusite Asbestos Deposit Exploration). Alma-Ata, 1965 (co-author);
- Geologicheskaya karta KazSSR (Geological Map of the Kazakh SSR). Leningrad, 1965;
- Geologostrukturnie osobennosti i metodika razvedki Jezkazganskogo rudnogo polya (Geological and Structural Features and Exploration Methods of the Jezkazgan Ore Field). Alma-Ata, 1968;
- Nedra Kazakhstana (Subsoil Resources of Kazakhstan). Alma-Ata, 1968, (co-author);
- Problemy geologii Kazakhstana (Problems of Geology of Kazakhstan). Alma-Ata, 1968;
- Nauchno-tekhnicheskiy progress v narodnom khozyaystve Kazakhskoy SSR (Scientific and Technological Progress in the Economy of the Kazakh SSR). Alma-Ata, 1972;
- Nauka i prirodnye resursy Kazakhstana (Science and Natural Resources of Kazakhstan). Alma-Ata, 1972;
- Neftyanie nauki (Petroleum science). Guriev, 1989.

== Awards ==
- 2 Orders of Lenin;
- Lenin Prize (1966) for the discovery of oil deposits in Mangyshlak;
- Shoqan Walikhanov Award of the KazSSR Academy of Sciences (1971);
- KazSSR State Award (1972);
- Triple Hero of Socialist Labour.

== Legacy ==
- Alma-Atinskaya Street in Thumbnail for Jezkazgan Region was renamed Shakhmardan Yessenov Street in February 1995.
- Aktau Polytechnic Institute was granted the name of Shakhmardan Yessenov in 1995.
- Shakhmardan Yessenov Foundation was established in 2013.
- A bust commemorating Shakhmardan Yessenov was unveiled in the Tartogay settlement (Qyzylorda Region) on August 5, 2017.
- The foundation stone for a monument to Shakhmardan Yessenov was laid in Aktau in front of the main building of Yessenov University on October 20, 2022.
