= Hanoi Marathon =

- Date: Early november
- Location: Hanoi, Vietnam
- Event type: Road
- Distance: Half marathon
- Primary sponsor: Standard Chartered
- Established: 2018
- Website: Official website

Standard Chartered Hanoi Marathon Heritage Race (previously VPBank Hanoi Marathon or Hanoi International Heritage Marathon) is a marathon event hosted annually in Hanoi, the capital of Vietnam. Beginning in 2018, the marathon has attracted professional and recreational runners, both foreign and Vietnamese, thanks to its course that runs though the Old Quarter of the city.

The marathon's loop course connects various city landmarks, beginning at the Ba Kieu Temple and ending at the Ly Thai To Park at the central lake of Hoan Kiem.

== History ==
Making its debut on October 21, 2018, the Hanoi International Heritage Marathon attracted more than 2,600 runners.

In 2019, the race was renamed the VPBank Hanoi Marathon after VPBank, a Vietnamese private bank, became the main sponsor of the event. The race also received certificates from IAAF and AIMS for its running course along with the AIMS membership.

In 2020, despite the COVID-19 pandemic, the marathon organizers went ahead to host the race on 18 October with several modifications in order to ensure runners' safety. The 42-kilometre (26 mi) distance had its start time at 12:00 am, making the marathon the first midnight race in Vietnam. The marathon organizers changed the race's schedule to make sure runners were safe to attend the competition amid the pandemic. The start time for the full marathon was set at 12:00 am, and that for the 21-kilometre (13 mi) distance was also moved to 3:00 am, or two hours earlier than in 2018. While many foreign runners could not come to Vietnam to join the marathon, the race still attracted nearly 6,000 athletes to compete directly in Hanoi, while thousands more from elsewhere joined the online marathon.

In addition, since Vietnam took turn to chair ASEAN activities in 2020, the Hanoi Marathon was selected as the official sports event of the year and launched as the VPBank Hanoi Marathon ASEAN 2020.

The VPBank Hanoi Marathon 2021 became one of the official sports activities to welcome the 31st SEA Games regional sports festival held in Vietnam in May 2022. More than 200 non-professional runners had been selected from the marathon to join the event's accompanying run.

Later that year, nearly 12,000 runners registered to compete in the VPBank Hanoi Marathon 2022, with 3,000 of them signing up for the 42-km distance, the largest number to ever register for the distance at a marathon in Vietnam.

In February 2023, the organizers of the marathon reverted its name to the officially licensed name, the Hanoi Marathon - Heritage Race.

The course is certified by the World Athletics and receives Grade A measurers of the Association of International Marathons and Distance Races (AIMS). The marathon is on the event calendar of the Vietnam Athletics Federation (VAF) and an official member of AIMS.

In 2024, the marathon receives title sponsorship from Standard Chartered bank, making it the 10th race in the Standard Chartered Marathon franchise.

== Organization ==
The marathon's Organizing Committee includes DHA Vietnam, a Hanoi-based professional event-hosting company, and the Hanoi People's Committee, the municipal government.

=== DHA Vietnam ===
DHA Vietnam Ltd., established in 2012, is a Hanoi-based limited liability company (LLC) which specializes in technology transfer, advertising, and event management. Since its first year, the company has been responsible for many successful sports events and professional conferences based in Vietnam, like Halong International Heritage Marathon, Happy Colour Run, Thang Long International Conference on Cardiology 2018, and FIG Working Week 2019. The company has also partnered with many international organizations like the World Bank and UNESCO.

== Race ==
Runners can compete in four distances: full marathon (42.2 kilometres (26.2 mi)), half marathon (21 kilometres (13 mi)), the 10-kilometre (6.2 mi) run, and the 5-kilometre (3.1 mi) fun run.

Annually, the marathon is held on the Sunday of the third week of October. As it is Hanoi's autumn at the time, the race day usually has fairly cool and dry weather.

== Course ==
The Hanoi's marathon loop course starts at the Ba Kieu Temple, while the finish line for all its four distances is set in front of the King Ly Thai To Park by the Hoan Kiem lake.

The Hanoi Marathon's route runs past many of the city's landmarks such as Hanoi Old Quarters, the Temple of Literature, West Lake, Ho Chi Minh Mausoleum, Hanoi's Flag Tower and Long Bien Bridge.

== Winners ==
Key: Course record

Edition	Year	Men's winner	Time (h:m:s)	Women's winner	Time (h:m:s)	Ref.
1st	2018	Hà Văn Nhật (VIE)	2:51:54	Phạm Thị Huệ (VIE)	2:51:54	
2nd	2019	Liu Hongliang (CHN)	2:33:51	Phạm Thị Hồng Lệ (VIE)	2:55:43	
3rd	2020	Trịnh Quốc Lương (VIE)	2:27:21	Phạm Thị Hồng Lệ (VIE)	2:56:31	
4th	2021	Tuấn Lê Văn (VIE)	2:27:42	Phạm Thị Hồng Lệ (VIE)	2:55:29	
5th	2022	Trịnh Quốc Lương (VIE)	2:29:12	Nguyễn Thị Oanh (VIE)	2:50:26	
6th	2023	Dino Sefir (ETH)	2:16:29	Lê Thị Tuyết (VIE)	2:44:37	
7th	2024	Edwin Yebei Kiptoo (KEN)	2:25:15	Hoàng Thị Ngọc Hoa (VIE)	2:52:24	
8th	2025	Duber Abdisa Teshome (ETH)	2:25:15	Lema Alemitu Ajema (ETH)	2:52:24	

=== Wins by country ===
Country	Men's	Women's	Total
Vietnam	4	7	11
China	1	0	1
Ethiopia	2	1	3
Kenya	1	0	1
