= Ulaanbaatar Marathon =

Annual race in Ulaanbaatar, Mongolia

- The 2026 Ulaanbaatar Marathon logo
- Date: Third Saturday of May
- Location: Ulaanbaatar, Mongolia
- Event type: Road
- Distance: Marathon; 42.195 kilometres (26.219 mi)
- Established: 2014 (12 years ago)
- Organizer: Governor of the Capital City
- Website: ulaanbaatar.marathon.mn

The Ulaanbaatar Marathon (Mongolian: Улаанбаатар марафон) is an annual international marathon held in Ulaanbaatar, Mongolia. This event was first established in 2014 by the Governor of the Capital City and usually happens on the third Saturday of May, coinciding with the city's car-free day. It is the largest mass-participation sporting event in Mongolia, attracting thousands of local and international runners of all skill levels. In addition to a marathon, it includes a half-marathon and several shorter races.

The first Ulaanbaatar Night Marathon took place in late September of 2026.

== History ==
=== 2010s ===
The Ulaanbaatar Marathon was first held 12 years ago on 7 June 2014 by the Governor of the Capital City together with the Mongolian Athletics Federation. The event was created to promote long-distance running, encourage active lifestyles among residents, and establish Ulaanbaatar as an international sports tourism destination. The initial event in 2014 drew over 16,000 participants.

Attendance increased to approximately 18,000 runners in 2015, 27,000 in 2016, and it surpassed 30,000 by 2017. To accommodate the growing number of amateur athletes, organizers aligned the race with Ulaanbaatar's official car-free day that froze motor vehicle traffic across the central city grid in order to ensure pedestrian safety.

=== 2020s ===
The marathon was cancelled in 2020 and 2021 due to the COVID-19 pandemic. In 2022 about 23,690 people participated in the event, 150 of which were international. There were over 20,000 participants in 2023 and over 30,000 in both 2024 and 2025.

Over 46,000 people attended the marathon across all events in 2026, surpassing all previous years. In late September, the National Anti-Doping Agency of Mongolia claimed that the 2026 marathon winner, Kenyan runner Seroi Anderson Saitoti, tested positive for trimetazidine. 2026 was also the year of the first Ulaanbaatar Night Marathon, which had around 9,000 participants.

== Events ==
The Ulaanbaatar Marathon has multiple separate events. These include a 42 km (26 mi) marathon, a 21 km (13 mi) half-marathon, a 10 km (6.2 mi) run, and a 5 km (3.1 mi) run. The half-marathon is available for people 18-34 and over 55, while the full marathon 10 km run are open to anyone over 18. There are also two family runs, 800 m (870 yd) and 1,500 m (1,600 yd).

Three races are included within the Ulaanbaatar Night Marathon event, these being the 21 km (13 mi) half-marathon, the 10 km (6.2 mi) run, and the 5 km (3.1 mi) run. The night marathon also features live music, DJs, and other performances.
