= Taj Mahal Marathon =

- The eastern gate of Taj Mahal, Agra, is the start line of the Taj Mahal Marathon, spread across 222 km.
- Date: 14–16 June 2013
- Location: Agra, India
- Event type: Road
- Distance: Ultramarathon
- Established: 2013
- Website: Endurance India

The Taj Mahal Marathon is a long-distance running event in Agra, India, held annually since 14 June 2013. The race was founded by India's youngest ultramarathon runner, engineer Gaurav Madan. Set over a largely flat course around the Chambal River and River Yamuna, the race begins at three separate points around Taj Mahal, Agra, and finishes in Bhangarh, Rajasthan. The crew-supported marathon is the longest in India in terms of distance.

== Route ==
The marathon is set over a largely flat course along the Chambal River from River Yamuna, spanning 222 kilometres (138 miles). The course begins at three points: the Eastern Gate, Southern Gate and Western Gate of Taj Mahal, and leads to NH 11 towards Jaipur, then on to Bharatpur, Rajasthan via Fatehpur Sikri. The course runs alongside the Keoladeo National Park.

After crossing Bharatpur, the route leads to the city of Dausa, Rajasthan. This partially deserted landscape is considerably hot in the month of June, with daytime temperatures rising above 116 °F (47 °C). In Dausa, the marathon route joins the National Highway 11A Dausa, which leads to the finish at Bhangarh, Alwar, Rajasthan.

The runners scale a distance of 222 km (138 mi) during the marathon, passing the three mandatory checkpoints: Bharatpur, Mehandipur Balaji Temple and Dausa, with a gross elevation gain of 2,000 ft. For the duration of the marathon, runners are accompanied by their mandatory support crew, along with the support vehicle and medical support team.

The marathon has a cut-off time of 48 hours from the start, with no individual time station cut-offs. Runners must be over 21 years of age and have completed at least two ultramarathons to participate in the marathon.

== See also ==
- Taj Mahal
