= Palau Marathon =

Palau Marathon is an annual marathon race in the Pacific island state of Palau, which has been organized by the Palau Track and Field Association since 2004. The route varies, in 2017 the marathon started in Ngardmau and led over the Koror-Babeldaob Bridge at 20 miles to the finish on the beach of the Palau Pacific Resort on Ngerekebesang Island.

== Statistics ==
Number	Date	Men	Time (h)	Women	Time (h)	Finisher
5.	April 5, 2008	Minoru Suzuki	3:26:10	Olai Polloi	6:31:40	3 + 1
6.	April 11, 2009	Toshikazu Misawa	4:14:42	Noemi Neipert	4:14:42	2 + 3
7.	April 3, 2010	Joynal Mize	4:11:48	Joyleen Chilton	7:55:49	5 + 1
8.	April 2, 2011	Brook Kintz	3:36:07	—		8 + 0
9.	April 7, 2012	unknown		unknown		5 + 1
10.	May 18, 2013	Joynal Mize	3:42:25	Haley Cash	4:44:06	
11.	April 5, 2014	unknown		unknown		
12.	April 4, 2015	Nathan Cogswell	3:26:22	Angela Sy	4:11:20	10 + 5
13.	September 3, 2016	Denefher Flores	4:09:03	Miho Nagaya	6:08:38	10 + 1
14.	April 8, 2017	Joynal Mize	4:26:05	Yen Nguyen	6:45:32	7 + 1
15.	April 7, 2018	Aaron Salvador	4:44:13	Imee Delos Santos	5:30:14	9 + 5
16.	April 6, 2019	Denefher Flores	4:44:13	Mayumi Sone	4:34:26	13

== See also ==
- Belau Omal Marathon
