= Accra Milo Marathon =

Annual race in Ghana

Accra Milo Marathon is an annual event held in Accra, the capital city of Ghana. It was first held in 1987. The marathon was skipped from 2016 until new sponsors were found in 2023.

Winners of this event are usually sent to compete in the Amsterdam Marathon. It starts at the Point in Nungua and the finish line is at the Dansoman Keep Fit Club. It is normally run in September but sometimes October when the need arises.

The marathon was previously hosted by Nestlé and is named for the drink Milo. Nestlé withdrew their sponsorship in 2018.
