= Accra International Marathon =

The Accra International Marathon is an annual marathon event held in Accra, the capital of Ghana. As well as the full marathon, it also stages a half marathon. The race starts in the beach town of Prampram, continues through the port city of Tema before finishing at the popular Labadi Beach Hotel. Many international runners also join to participate. The event is held annually on the last Sunday in October.
