= List of radio stations in Ukraine =

This is a list of radio stations in Ukraine.

== Public stations in Ukraine ==
Suspilne Ukraine

- "Ukrainian Radio" (with regional time blocks in weekdays 12:35-13:00 and 17:35-18:00 Kyiv time) (FM in Ukraine, DAB+ in Kyiv, Czechia, Mainz and Madrid, UKV in Polonne, Chemerivtsi, Lypovets, Zhmerinka, Bar, Tomashpil, Orativ and Shargorod)
- "Radio Promin" (FM in Ukraine, DAB+ in Kyiv, UKV in Khust, Kamyanets-Podilskyi and Olevsk)
- "Radio Kultura" (FM in Ukraine, DAB+ in Kyiv, UKV in Odesa, Vesternychany and Bershad)
- Radio Ukraine International (1386 AM in Lithuania (21:30-4:00 UTC))
- Internet-stations:
  - Radio Tysa
  - Radio Tochka
  - Radio Kultura Kazka
  - Radio Klutura Klasika

== International radio stations ==
- Polish radio Ukrainian service – 1386 AM (5:00-5:30 UTC), satellite (HotBird 13), Internet, channel "Polish Radio for Ukraine" (DAB+ in Poland), also retranslation in Radio Poland DAB+ (DAB+ in Poland), Hromadkse Radio and local stations in Ukraine
- Vatican Radio Ukrainian Service – shortwave, satellite and Internet station, also retranslation in Radio Maria Ukraine
- Trans World Radio Ukraine – 1035 AM and Internet station
- Radio Romania International Ukrainian Service – in shortwave, satellite and Internet. Half hour programms three times a day

== Commercial radio groups in Ukraine ==
TAVR Media

- Hit FM
- Radio Bayraktar
- Melodiya FM
- Radio Roks
- Nashe Radio
- Radio Relax
- Kiss FM
- Classic Radio
- Radio Jazz (Kyiv 104.6 FM, Lviv 105.4 FM, Dnipro 89.3 FM, Zaporizhzhia 89.9 FM)

Business Radio Group

- Shlyager FM
- DJ FM
- POWER FM
- Magic Radio (Kyiv 93.8 FM)

JSC Lux

- Lux FM
- Radio Maximum
- Radio Nostalgie

Mediaholding Evolution

- Radio P'yatnytsya
- Avtoradio

1st Ukrainian Radio Group

- Perec FM
- Best FM (Kyiv 95.6 FM, Konotop 88.5 FM, Irpin 66,40 UKV, Bilohorodka 68,10 UKV)
- MFM (Kharkiv 91.2 FM)

Group Company "Prosto"

- Prosto Radi.O (Kyiv 102.5 FM, Mykolaiv 104.6 FM, Odesa 105.3 FM, Izmail 101.2 FM)
- Europa Plus Odesa (Odesa 89.7 FM)
- Narodne Radio (Odesa 103.2 FM)
- Radio Miami (Odesa 107.0 FM)

== Other commercials, non-commercials and religious radio stations in Ukraine ==
- Army FM (The Ministry of Defence of Ukraine) (FM in Ukraine and DAB+ in Kyiv)
- Radio NV (Dragon Capital)
- Kraina FM
- Radio Champion (Group Konkurent)
- Radio "Voice of Hope" Ukraine (Adventist World Radio) (FM in Ukraine, 17:00-18:00 UTC on 1035 AM in Estonia)
- Radio Maria Ukraine (Kyiv 100.5 FM and DAB+, Zhytomyr 104.9 FM, Zaporizhzhia 96.8 FM. UKV in 11 cities, including Zhytomyr and Zaporizhzhia)
- Radio NovaLine
- Radio Emmanuil (UKV in 8 cities)
- Teren FM (FM in Ukraine and DAB+ in Kyiv)
- Hromadske Radio
- Radio M (FEBC)
- Radio My-Ukraina (Kyiv 106.0 FM, Odesa 96.6 FM, Zaporizhzhya 105.1 FM)
- Pryamyi FM (Free Media Holding) (Kyiv 88.4 FM, Bila Tserkva 98.8 FM, Pereiaslav 107.7 FM)

== Local, regional and interregional radio stations in Ukraine ==
Interregional stations

- FM Galychyna (Lviv region (Lviv 89.7 FM, Sheptytskyi 103.0 FM, Radekhiv 103.6 FM, Brody 107.5 FM, Novyi Rozdil 107.6 FM, Stryi 107.9 FM, Staryi Sambir 102.7 FM, Boryslav 102.9 FM, Turka 105.9 FM, Slavsko 102.6 FM), Zakarpattya region (Mizhhirya 102.3 FM), Ivano-Frankivs'k region (Yablunytsya 107.7 FM, Verkhovyna 106.7 FM), Ternopil 102.3 FM, Volyn Region (Lutsk 89.8 FM, Shatsk 106.7 FM), Rivne 89.5 FM))
- Lvivska Khvylia (Lviv region (Lviv 100.8 FM, Boryslav 91.7 FM, Pidbuzh 98.0 FM, Skole 104.4 FM), Volyn region (Shatsk 89.6 FM, Lyuboml 90.3 FM, Novovolynsk 105.0 FM, Horokhiv 89.4 FM, Olyka 98.8 FM, Kovel 87.7 FM, Lyubeshiv 102.6 FM), Rivne region (Zarichne 107.1, Sarny 98.1 FM), Khmelnitskyi region (Slavuta 100.0 FM, Polonne 107.5 FM, Kamyanets-Podilskyi 105.7 FM))
  - Ternopil's'ka Khvylya (Ternopil 106.8 FM, Buchach 87.5 FM, Chortkiv 105.9 FM, Kremenets 93.0 FM, Lanivtsi 89.8 FM)
- Informator FM (Dnipro 107.3 FM, Odesa region (Odesa 103.8 FM, Izmayl 98.6 FM, Kamyanske 102.6 FM, Petrovirivka 103.4 FM), Uman 101.0 FM (Cherksay region) and Pereiaslav 95.8 FM (Kyiv region))
- Radio Megapolis (Dnipro region (Dnipro 90.9 FM, Kamyans'ke 97.7 FM, Pavlohrad 107.9 FM and 73,88 UKV, Nikopol 88.0 FM, Kryvyi Rih 105.2 FM) and Novovorontsovka 93.8 FM (Kherson region))
- Radio Svityaz (Volyn region (Novovolynsk 98.1 FM, Kovel 93.2 FM, Olyka 97.5 FM) and Dubno 92.6 FM (Rivne region))
- Radio Smak (Zolochiv 89.9 FM (Lviv region) and Horokhiv 93.7 FM (Volyn region))
- Podil's’ke Radio (Vinnytsia region (Ladyzhyn 103.9 FM, Illintsi 96.6 FM), Cherkasy region (Monastyryshche 89.6 FM))
- OKEY FM (Khmelnitskyi 105.4 FM, Vinnytsia region (Khmilnyk 105.5 FM, Kalynivka 88.2 FM, Kozyatyn 99.5 FM))
- Blits FM (Kyiv region (Fastiv 95.0 FM, Bila Tserkva 103.3 FM, Rokytne 100.3 FM, Boguslav 94.4 FM) and Cherkasy region (Uman 90.6 FM and Smila 102.0 FM))

Kyiv region

- Kyiv FM (Kyiv 98.0 FM)
- Europa Plus Kyiv (Kyiv 107.0 FM)
- Boryspil FM (Boryspil 94.9 FM)
- Radio Polis (Yahotyn 90.4 FM)
- Boguslav FM (Boguslav 97.7 FM)

Volyn region

- Radio Avers (Lutsk 100.9 FM, Kovel 95.4 FM, Shatsk 91.4 FM, Lyubeshiv 98.7 FM, Novolynsk 94.3 FM, Horokhiv 97.2 FM, Tsuman 98.4 FM)
- Radio Bug (Lutsk 94.7 FM, Novovolynsk 104.4 FM)
- Radio 1 (Lutsk 100.1 FM)
- SiD FM (Lutsk 102.4 FM)

Lviv region

- Radio Pershe (Lviv 88.2 FM, Brody 89.2 FM)
- Duze Radio (Lviv 104.3 FM)
- Radio Nezalezhnist (Lviv 106.7 FM) Included polish-language programm Radio Lwów (Saturday 9:00-12:00) and programs from Polskie Radio (Polish service)
- Golos Stryia (Stryi 90.0 FM)
- Stryi FM (Stryi 101.0 FM)
- Fresh FM (Stryi 104.8 FM)
- Svoya Khvylia (Truskavets 98.8 FM)
- Tvoye Radio (Truskavets 101.4 FM)
- Brody FM (Brody 88.8 FM)
- Bus'ke radio (Krasne 87.5 FM)
- Golos Prykarpattya (Staryi Sambir 91.4 FM)
- Karpats'kyi Homin (Turka 97.2 FM)
- Neoradio (Sheptytskyi 100.5 FM)
- Radio Frankova Zemlya (Drohobych 99.4 FM)
- Radio Mykolaiv (Mykolaiv 95.7 FM)
- Radio Postup (Sambir 92.9 FM)
- Radio Radekhiv (Radekhiv 99.5 FM, Peremyshlyany 105.1 FM)
- Radio Rozdilya (Novyi Rozdil 93.0 FM)
- Radio Slovo (Boryslav 100.2 FM)
- Radio Sokal (Sokal 101.0 FM)
- Yavir FM (Yavoriv 94.6 FM, Mostyska 97.4 FM)
- Radio Skolivski Beskydy (Skole 99.0 FM)
- Vilʹne Radio Korolivsʹkoho Mista (Zhovkva 94.0 FM and Rava Ruska 93.6 FM)
- Yantarne FM (Novoyavorivsk 97.6 FM and Ivano-Frankove 92.8 FM)
- Zhydachiv FM (Zhydachiv 99.9 FM)
- Zolochiv FM (Zolochiv 89.5 FM)

Zakarpattya region

- Zakarpattya FM (Uzhhorod 101.6 FM, Khust 101.9 FM, Mizhhirya 104.1 FM, Rakhiv 105.1 FM, Yasinya 104.4 FM)
- Radio Svit FM (Uzhhorod 104.7 FM, Mukachevo 107.8 FM, Khust 89.1 FM, Dubove 103.5 FM)
- Zakhid FM+ (Khust 88.2 FM, Mizhhirya 106.0 FM, Rakhiv 103.1 FM)
- Radio 7 (Khust 91.5 FM, Lysychovo 88.6 FM)
- Pulzus FM (Berehove 92.1 FM) In Ukrainian and Hungarian languages

Ivano-Frankivs'k region

- RAI Radio (Ivano-Frankivsk 90.6 FM, Nadvirna 90.3 FM, Yaremche 107.5 FM, Horodenka 90.0 FM, Kolomyia 107.6 FM, Dolyna 106.6 FM, Burshtyn 101.6 FM, Kosiv 105.6 FM, Verkhovyna 106.3 FM)
- Radio Zakhidnyi Polyus (Ivano-Frankivsk 104.3 FM, Kalush 105.5 FM, Harasymiv 99.0 FM, Rohatyn 97.5 FM, Yablunytsya 92.4 FM, Kosiv 101.4 FM)
- Radio Vezha (Ivano-Frankivsk 107.0 FM, Dolyna 88.3 FM, Burshtyn 99.2 FM)
- Radio Dzvony (Ivano-Frankivsk 105.8 FM, Kalush 98.9 FM, Hoshiv 92.8 FM)
- Radio Syaivo (Burshtyn 89.6 FM, Kolomyia 106.8 FM, Harasymiv 100.7 FM, Tatariv 106.7 FM, Richka 102.8 FM)
- Radio Nadvirna (Nadvirna 107.3 FM, Mykulychyn 106.0 FM)
- Radio Shans (Kalush 104.0 FM)
- Kalush FM (Kalush 107.4 FM)
- Hutsulʹsʹka Stolytsya (Verkhovyna 107.4 FM)
- Khvylya Hir (Dolyna 106.2 FM)

Chernivtsi region

- Radio 10 (Chernivtsi 103.2 FM, Storozynets' 107.5 FM, Vyzhnytsya 104.4 FM)
- TVA FM (Chernivtsi 93.4 FM, Novodnistrovs'k 101.9 FM)
- Bukovynsʹka Khvylya (Chernivtsi 100.0 FM)
- Radio C4 (Chernivtsi 106.6 FM)
- Sok FM (Novodnistrovs'k 89.2 FM, Kelmentsi 97.9 FM, Sokyryany 104.7 FM)
- Novodnistrovsʹke Radio (Novodnistrovs'k 102.3 FM)

Ternopil region

- UKH Radio - Ukrayinska Khvylya (Ternopil 101.1 FM)

Khmelnitskyi region

- Radio Misto (Khmelnytskyi 99.0 FM)
- Radio TV7+ FM (Teofipol 103.3 FM)
- Radio Horodok (Horodok 106.9 FM)

Rivne region

- Sfera FM (Rivne 102.2 FM, Demydivka 105.9 FM)
- Radio Trek (Rivne 106.4 FM, Varash 104.3 FM)
- Radio Rytm (Rivne 91.9 FM)
- Radio Respect (Ostroh 92.3 FM)

Zhytomyr region

- New Day FM (Zhytomyr 102.2 FM, Zvyagel 91.7 FM, Korosten 100.6 FM, Malyn 90.2 FM, Berdychiv 102.0 FM)
- Radio 106.1 FM (Zhytomyr 106.1 FM)
- Rekord FM (Berdychiv 105.2 FM)
- Korosten FM (Korosten 107.5 FM)

Vinnytsia region

- Radio Misto nad Bugom (Vinnytsia 101.8 FM, Kozyatyn 92.7 FM, Mohyliv-Podilskyi 94.6 FM)
- Radio Takt (Vinnytsia 103.7 FM)
- Bar FM (Bar 105.7 FM)
- Lada FM (Bershad 100.1 FM, Haisyn 101.6 FM, Vapniarka 106.3 FM)
- Pohlyad (Kozyatyn 66,41 UKV)
- Haysynsʹke Radio (Haysin 71,27 UKV)
- Zmerynske radio (Zhmerinka 67,34 UKV)
- Tomashpilske radio (Tomashpil 68,12 UKV)
- Govorit Orativ (Orativ 69,62 UKV)

Odesa region

- Pershe radio FM1 (Odesa 87.5 FM, Kamyanske 100.2 FM, Izmayil 95.4 FM)
- Pershe Mis’ke Radio (Odesa 102.7 FM)
- Mayak-Akademia - NRJ Radio (Odesa 100.4 FM)
- Radio Arsi (Artzys 92.4 FM)
- TIS FM (Prychornomorske 104.7 FM)

Cherkasy region

- Radio Magnit (Cherkasy 101.6 FM, Kamyanka 100.4 FM and Kaniv 99.7 FM)
- Ulyublene Radio (Kamyanka 106.4 FM, Orlovets 98.0 FM and Zvenyhorodka 87.9 FM)
- Radio MID FM (Uman 103.4 FM)
- Radio Uman (Uman 106.1 FM)
- Ekvator FM (Shpola 100.8 FM)
- Na Khvyli Korsunya - Ridne Radio (Korsun-Shevchenkivskyi 104.8 FM)
- Radio Chyhyryn (Chyhyryn 99.0 FM)

Kropyvnytski region

- Radio Lehion (Novomyrhorod 92.5 FM)

Kherson region

- Radio X.ON (Kherson 97.7 FM, Vysoke 93.6 FM, Velyka Oleksandrivka 92.5 FM)

Chernihiv region

- TIM FM (Chernihiv 102.4 FM, Nizhyn 93.1 FM, Pryluky 95.7 FM)
- Radio Borzna (Borzna 99.2 FM)
- Radyjo Volia (Dobrianka 87.7 FM, Ripky 97.7 FM) In Belarusian language

Poltava region

- TET-Poltava - NRJ Radio (Poltava 106.8 FM)
- Avtokhvylia - Avtoradio (Kremenchuk 102.1 FM)
- Avtokhvylia - NRJ Radio (Kremenchuk 106.0 FM)
- Radio Lubny (Lubny 100.8 FM)
- Myrhorod FM (Myrhorod 96.9 FM)
- Radio ReLife (Reshetylivka 91.1 FM)
- Opishnya FM (Opishnya 95.4 FM)
- Vyshnya FM (Zinkiv 97.2 FM)

Sumy region

- Pershe Konotops’ke Radio (Konotop 103.9 FM)
- Ekspres Radio (Konotop 106.2 FM)
- Radio TKS (Shostka 102.5 FM)
- Radio HIT (Okhtyrka 102.8 FM)

Kharkiv region

- Slobozhanske FM (Kharkiv 93.1 FM, Zmiiv 90.8 FM, Balakliya 104.9 FM, Izyum 89.7 FM, Barvinkove 103.4 FM, Blyzniuky 100.1 FM)
- Radio Nakypilo (Kharkiv 96.7 FM)
- Radio Pikhota (Zmiiv 91.4 FM and Izyum 88.8 FM)
- Radio Terra (Lozova 104.6 FM)
- Radio Centr (Berestyn 103.2 FM)

Dnipro region

- Europa Plus Dnipro (Dnipro 102.5 FM)
- Radio Kryvbas (Kryvyi Rih 102.3 FM)
- Radio Nostal'zhi (Nikopol 102.4 FM)
- Radio PTRK (Pavlohrad 90.3 FM)
- Indi Radio (Kamyans'ke 97.0 FM)
- TopRadio (Kamyans'ke 104.4 FM and Vilnohirsk 95.9 FM)

== See also ==
- List of radio stations in Kyiv
