= Radio Culture =

National radio station in Ukraine

- Type: Radio network
- Country: Ukraine

Ownership
- Owner: Suspilne
- Sister stations: Radio Ukraine; Radio Promin
- Key people: Dmytro Khorkin (General producer)

History
- Launch date: 1 January 2001; 25 years ago

Coverage
- Availability: International

Links
- Website: ukr.radio

Radio Culture (Ukrainian: Радіо Культура, romanized: Radio Kultura), also known as UR-3, is the third radio channel of Suspilne. The station broadcasts a cultural and educational format, delivering programs related to topics such as theatre, literature, classical music, education and science, history, visual arts, architecture, traditions, etc.

== History and profile ==
Logo from 2017 to 2022

Radio Culture started broadcasting on 1 January 2001 and its line-up consists of news and current affairs, scientific and cultural, artistic and educational programming, aimed at the largest possible audience. On a daily basis, the station broadcasts archives from Radio Ukraine's collections, as well as premieres of radio plays produced by the radio theatre editorial team. It also has a wide musical line-up: religious music, "eternal classics", symphonic music and folk songs.

Radio Ukraine, by means of Radio Culture, is one of the most active participants in the European Broadcasting Union's Euroradio exchange program. As part of this program, in 2019, recordings from Radio Ukraine, including those from the Ukrainian Radio Symphony Orchestra, were played more than 300 times in public radio stations around the world.

Since 2017, Radio Culture revived the concept of radio dramas in Ukraine. In 2018, it held the "UA/UK Radio Drama" competition with British Council and Mystetskyi Arsenal.

With the creation of the new Suspilne umbrella, in 2017, 21 new programs appeared on Radio Culture. The current logo was implemented in May 2022, inheriting its predecessor's purple in the semicircle.

== See also ==
- List of radio stations in Ukraine
- Suspilne Kultura
