= Tunisia–Ukraine relations =

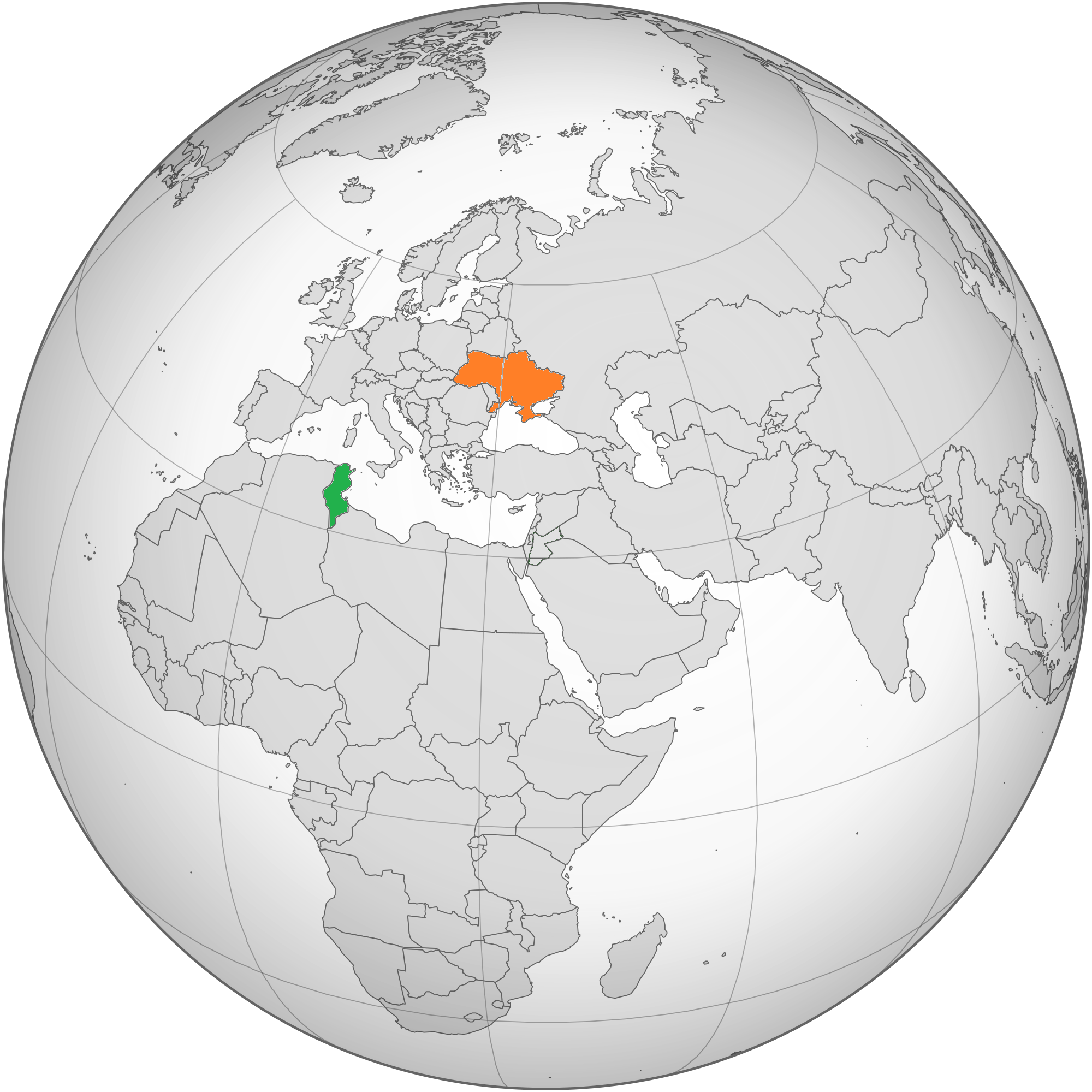
- Tunisia: Ukraine

Diplomatic mission
- Embassy of Tunisia, Warsaw: Embassy of Ukraine, Tunis

Tunisia–Ukraine relations are bilateral relations between Tunisia and Ukraine.

== History ==
On 25 December, 1991, Tunisia recognized Ukrainian independence, and the two countries signed protocols to establish diplomatic relations on 24 June, 1992.

In February 1993, representatives from Tunisia and Ukraine signed a protocol agreeing to conduct regular political consultations to strengthen bilateral relations.

Between 1992 and 2012, Ukraine and Tunisia have signed a total of 21 bilateral agreements on various subjects.

In February 2017, representatives from Ukraine and Tunisia met in Geneva during a session of the UN Human Rights Council.

On 16 May, 2018, Ukrainian diplomats met with members of the Tunisian National Assembly to discuss interparliamentary cooperation between Ukraine and Tunisia.

On 22 December, 2018, Tunisia supported UN Resolution 73/263 about human rights in Crimea, but abstained from Resolution 74/168 in December 2019 on the same subject.

On 16-17 April, 2019, the Intergovernmental Ukrainian-Tunisian Commission on Trade, Economic and Technical Cooperation held a meeting in Tunis, where the representatives agreed to cooperate in higher education, youth sports, commerce. They also agreed to establish a business council to continue commercial cooperation in the future.

== Economic relations ==
In 2019, the trade volume between Ukraine and Tunisia was $381.5 million USD. Among them, Ukrainian exports to Tunisia was valued at $362.5 million, while Tunisian exports to Ukraine was $19 million.

Ukrainian exports consist primarily of grain, ferrous metals, lead, fertilizers, and inorganic chemical products, while Tunisia's main exports were textiles, agricultural products, mechanical products, phosphates, hydrocarbons and electrical equipment.

== Cultural relations ==
According to the Ukrainian Ministry of Education and Science, 846 Tunisian students studied in Ukraine in the 2019-2020 academic year.

In November 2017, an art exhibition was held in Tunis featuring the works of Ukrainian artist Ivan Marchuk.

In 2017 and 2019, Ukrainian Radio Symphony Orchestra, with Volodymyr Sheiko as conductor, performed in Tunisia during the Festival international de musique symphonique d'El Jem.

== Diplomatic missions ==
On 11 October, 1993, Tunisia opened its embassy in the Ukrainian capital of Kyiv. However, the Tunisian government closed this embassy in 1997 due to financial reasons. In September 1996, Ukraine opened its embassy in the Tunisian capital of Tunis.

== See also ==
- Foreign relations of Tunisia
- Foreign relations of Ukraine
