= Suspilne Lviv =

Public regional television and radio channel in Ukraine

- Lviv; Ukraine
- Broadcast area: Lviv Oblast
- Frequency: 103.3 MHz (FM)

Programming
- Language: Ukrainian
- Format: Local news, talk and music

Ownership
- Owner: Suspilne

History
- First air date: 13 January 1930 (as Polish Radio Lwów); 24 December 1957 (as Lviv Television)

Technical information
- Licensing authority: Derzhkomteleradio

Links
- Website: suspilne.media/lviv/

Suspilne Lviv (Ukrainian: Суспільне Львів) is a public regional television and radio channel in Lviv Oblast, Ukraine. It is the local branch of the Suspilne broadcaster. Prior to the merger of Lviv's television and radio stations in 2018, both had been involved in the preservation of Ukrainian culture amidst Soviet Russification policies. Lviv was also an early pioneer in both radio and television technology, with radio broadcasting dating back to 1930 and television broadcasting dating to 1957.

== History ==
=== Radio ===
Regional radio broadcasting in the city of Lviv began under the Second Polish Republic, with Polish Radio Lwów launching its first broadcast on 13 January 1930. At the time, all broadcasts were in the Polish language. Lviv was the second city in modern-day Ukraine to have a radio broadcaster, after Kharkiv. The first Ukrainian-language radio broadcasts in Lviv were for a period of three days in 1941, when the act of restoration of the Ukrainian state was read out. Red Army soldiers attacked the studio during broadcasts, throwing grenades into the building and cutting power. As a result, the broadcast was read out under candlelight. With a range throughout western Ukraine, the broadcast allowed individuals living outside Lviv to be aware of the declaration, resulting in an upswing in support for the Organisation of Ukrainian Nationalists. Three members of the OUN (Yaroslav Starukh, Zenon Tarnavskyi and Yulian Savytskyi) were arrested by the Gestapo for organising Ukrainian-language radio services on 2 July 1941; Savytskyi later died at Auschwitz concentration camp.

Under the Soviet Union, workers at Lviv's radio station were involved in protecting Ukrainian cultural heritage. Recordings of Vasyl Barvinsky and Volodymyr Ivasiuk were preserved by the studio, and plans to open Ukraine's first interactive museum of radio in the former Lviv radio headquarters began to be realised in 2022.

=== Television ===
Lviv Television began its first broadcast on 24 December 1957 with a recording of the ballet La Esmeralda from the Lviv Theatre of Opera and Ballet. At the time of the broadcast, the city had only ten television sets. Lviv Television's tower, with a total height of 192 metres, was built on the ruins of the historic Lviv High Castle. One resident later recounted that the local population anticipated the event, saying:

When we heard that the Lviv television centre was coming around, almost all my neighbours, fifteen people, gathered in my flat. We all watched the first programmes with eagerness. The image on the screen was clear, worse was the sound, which sometimes was completely lost.

In its early years Lviv Television was broadcast throughout western Ukraine, including Chernivtsi, Ivano-Frankivsk, Rivne, Ternopil, Volyn and Zakarpattia oblasts in addition to Lviv Oblast. The station suffered from an inability to function on a permanent basis during this time period, with broadcasts being over a two-hour period, once per week. Films were broadcast by pointing a camera at a projector screen in a local garage. Public interest soon drew increasing numbers of people to join the studio as employees, and by the beginning of 1959 around 100 people were working at Lviv Television. By 1960, it was broadcasting six days a week, had set up a mobile television studio and had its broadcasts received in Lublin. Between 1963 and 1964 mountainous villages were connected to Lviv Television and Soviet Central Television as part of efforts to improve coverage. In some cases, Soviet Central Television and Lviv Television were transmitted by a common frequency.

As Soviet Russification of Ukrainian culture became harsher, Lviv Television became the sole public outlet for Ukrainian culture to be expressed in Lviv and a uniquely non-Russified television station across the entire Ukrainian Soviet Socialist Republic. In particular, the station's musical programmes received public attention for their high quality, drawing millions of viewers. Lviv Television was also the third television station (after Kharkiv and Kyiv) to broadcast in colour in Ukraine, beginning in 1976.

A realignment of Ukrainian television networks saw ORT and the combined UT-2/UT-3/RTR channel (of which Lviv Television occupied designated regional programming slots since the January 1, 1992 move to channel 6) swap frequencies in most areas on August 1, 1995. Due to the low number of Russophones in Lviv Oblast, most ORT programmes – except the Tropicaliente soap opera – were covered by Ukrainian-language Lviv Television programmes. The launch of Inter on 20 October 1996 as a Ukrainian replacement for ORT led to protests by Lviv Television workers, who protested the displacement of their own television programmes by a national-level broadcaster. Over a month of negotiations took place between the governing bodies of Lviv Television and Inter, as a result of which both Inter and Lviv Television were allowed to broadcast.

=== Merger and modern history ===
Lviv Television and Lviv Radio were merged into a publicly owned corporation known as "UA:Lviv" (Ukrainian: UA:Львів) on 18 May 2018. The merger was noted for the poor public relations management shown by the National Public Broadcasting Company in the leadup to the merger. Officials at the NPBC had promised that the merger would lead to Lviv's television programmes being "high-quality" content, but it was later discovered that the film equipment owned by Lviv Television was financially unsustainable after the merger. 215 employees of Lviv Television were also fired as part of corporate downsizing, as Lviv Oblast had the highest number of employees prior to the merger at 311. The downsizing measures sparked protests among employees. The merger was also marked by a new television schedule, including a live entertainment morning show, news broadcasts and an analytical television programme in the evening.

During the 2020 Ukrainian local elections UA:Lviv broadcast a debate between candidates for mayor of Lviv Andriy Sadovyi and Oleh Synyutka. Following the debate Synyutka complained that it had not been organised properly according to the paragraphs of Ukraine's electoral code involving electoral debates. The editorial team gave a written response saying that it was not beholden to the electoral code, as it was paid for by the government of Ukraine rather than electoral expenses as public broadcasting.

UA:Lviv was rebranded to Suspilne Lviv on 23 May 2022, as part of a broader rebranding by the NPBC under the name "Suspilne".
