= State Committee for Television and Radio-broadcasting (Ukraine) =

State Committee for Television and Radio-Broadcasting of Ukraine
- Державний комітет телебачення і радіомовлення України; Держкомтелерадіо

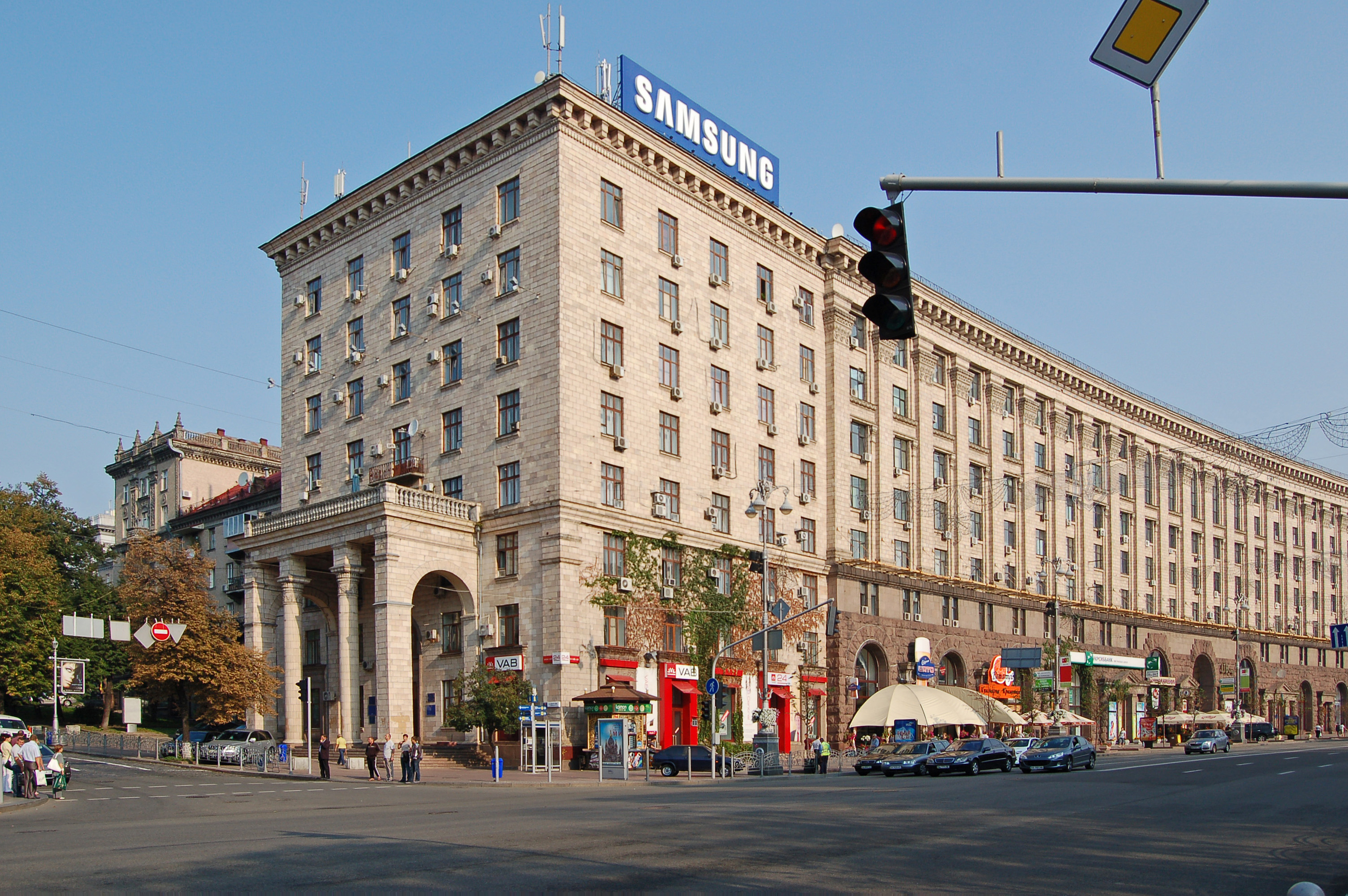

Agency overview
- Formed: 2003
- Preceding agency: State Committee for Informative Policy, Television, and Radio-broadcasting
- Jurisdiction: Ukraine
- Headquarters: 2 vulytsia Prorizna, Kyiv
- Ministers responsible: Oleh Nalyvaiko, Head of Committee; Bohdan Chervak, First Deputy Head
- Parent agency: Cabinet of Ministers
- Child agencies: Territorial-based broadcasting companies; National and Special broadcasting companies; Selected State Publishing Houses
- Website: http://comin.kmu.gov.ua/

The State Committee for Television and Radio-Broadcasting of Ukraine (Ukrainian: Державний комітет телебачення і радіомовлення України, romanized: Derzhavnyi komitet telebachennia i radiomovlennia Ukrainy), also known as Derzhkomteleradio (Ukrainian: Держкомтелерадіо), is a central body of executive power with a special status, activities of which are directed and coordinated by the Cabinet of Ministers of Ukraine. Derzhkomteleradio is the main in the system of central bodies of the executive power in formation and realization of the state policy in the sphere of television, radio-broadcasting, informational and publishing spheres.

== Infrastructure ==
- National Public Broadcasting Company of Ukraine (channel "Pershyi Natsionalnyi")
- National Radio Company of Ukraine "Ukrainske Radio"
- The territorial-based broadcasting companies are abbreviated as ODTRK which stands for the Regional State Television Radio Company.
  - There are 27 ODTRKs in each region of Ukraine
- Ukrainian Studio of Television Films "Ukrtelefilm"
- State Television and Radio Broadcasting Company Culture (DTRK) "Kultura"
- Ukrainian Television and Radio (International service "Ukrainian television and radio broadcasting")
- State Municipal Television and Radio Company "Siverska"
- Kryvorizke Municipal State Union of Television and Radiobroadcasting
- 20 publishing agencies

== Supporting establishments ==
- State enterprise Publishing and printing house "Tavrida"
- State enterprise Information-Analytic Center "Donbasinform"
- State enterprise "Poliservis"
- State science institution "Ivan Fedorov's Book Chamber of Ukraine"
- State specialized enterprise "Ukrtelefilm"
- State specialized auto-transportational enterprise
- Ukrainian institute for improvement of qualification for workers of television, radio, and press (Ukrteleradiopresinstytut)
- All-Ukrainian information-cultural Center (Simferopol)
- State enterprise "Directory of festival-exhibition activities"
- State enterprise "State orchestra "RadioBand of Oleksandr Fokin"
