= Radio Promin =

Ukrainian national radio station

- Type: Radio network
- Country: Ukraine

Ownership
- Owner: Suspilne
- Sister stations: Ukrainian Radio; Radio Kultura
- Key people: Dmytro Khorkin (General producer)

History
- Launch date: 22 April 1965; 60 years ago

Coverage
- Availability: International

Links
- Website: promin.fm

Radio Promin (Ukrainian: Радіо Промінь, romanized: Radio Promin', lit. 'Radio Lightbeam'), also known as UR-2, is the second radio channel of Suspilne. Its format is a youth-oriented music and entertainment service.

Its FM transmitter network covers 71 transmitters in 24 regions, including 22 regional centers.

== History ==
Logo from 2017 to 2022

Radio Promin was created in Soviet times as Radio Ukraine's second network on 26 April 1965, as a music and entertainment service simply called Promin, delivered on medium wave.

Since the summer of 1988, it broadcasts overnight on weeknights and in the daytime on weekdays, and since 1992 on a full-time basis.

In 2017, it became a part of the larger Suspilne umbrella corporation. Promin improved its programming in line with the rebrand, with the introduction of sixteen new programs covering topics such as new music, contemporary music, sports, fashion, social media, relationship psychology, education, etc.

In May 2022, Radio Promin introduced a new logo, aligned with Suspilne's new brand identity, maintaining its previous orange color. From 20 November to 18 December 2022, Radio Promin's network was used to carry the 2022 FIFA World Cup.

== See also ==
- List of radio stations in Ukraine
