= Suspilne Sport =

- Country: Ukraine
- Headquarters: Kyiv, Ukraine

Programming
- Language: Ukrainian
- Picture format: 1080i HDTV (downscaled to 16:9 576i for the SDTV feed)

Ownership
- Owner: Suspilne
- Sister channels: Pershyi; Suspilne Kultura

History
- Launched: 14 August 2023; 2 years ago (test broadcast); 29 November 2023; 2 years ago (regular broadcasts)

Links
- Website: suspilne.media/sport

Suspilne Sport (Ukrainian: Суспільне Спорт) is a Ukrainian sports television channel, operated by the Public Broadcasting Company of Ukraine.

The brand appeared in 2020 as a section in its website. After 2022, the brand began to materialize due to the corporate rebrand, eyeing closer to the launch of a linear television channel, which was achieved in 2023.

== History ==
Even before the network was launched, the brand first appeared on 20 August 2020. Suspilne's digital division was eyeing the creation of a single digital ecosystem for its website, as well as the potential of expanding the corporation's sports coverage.

On 23 May 2022, Suspilne introduced its new brand identity; Suspilne Sport adopted green as its color.

From 20 November to 18 December 2022, the Suspilne Sport website and the regional stations of the corporation broadcast 46 of the 64 matches of the 2022 FIFA World Cup. In total, about 2,4 million viewers watched the matches on its website, while World Cup-related content on its YouTube channel attracted 11,7 million views.

In July 2023, Suspilne announced that the channel would begin satellite distribution in November. The corporation believed that converting a web channel to a permanent satellite channel was a "logical step", especially given the situation Ukrainian athletes have been facing since the war began. For this end, Suspilne suggested the renaming of the license of Suspilne Uzhhorod to the new Suspilne Sport channel.

On 29 November 2023, full-time broadcasts of Suspilne Sport began, on both satellite television and OTT platforms.
