= Alla Sheiko =

Sheiko Alla (born February 14, 1962) is choirmaster of The Boys and Youth Choir of the P. Tchaikovsky National Music Academy of Ukraine and artistic director and Head of the Practice Sector of the National Music Academy of Ukraine. Born in Poltava. Graduated from the choral-conducting Faculty (prof. O.Tymoshenko) and post- training (prof. O. Tymoshenko) of the choral-conducting department of the Kiev Tchaikovsky Conservatory. She taught at the Poltava M. Lysenko Music College, R. Glier Kyiv Music College, P. Tchaikovsky National Music Academy of Ukraine. She is an author of articles about the history of foreign choral music.

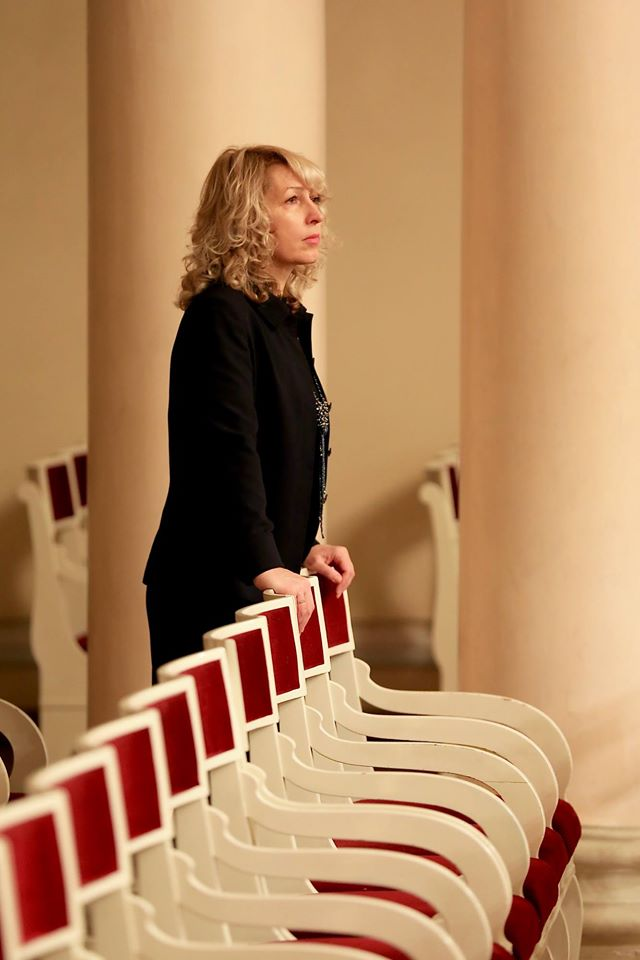
Sheiko Alla, was a choirmaster of The Boys.

== Professional Activities ==
Since 2001, directs the boys and youth choir of the Practice Sector of the National Music Academy of Ukraine, with which became the winner of numerous international competitions and festivals. Among them are:

- XXXII th International Festival of Orthodox Church Music “Hajnowka 2013” (Poland, 2013);
- International Choir Festival of Sacred Music in Kosice (Slovakia, 2006, 2010);
- Poland Choir Festival of Sacred Music “Carmen Sacrum Festival” Kalish (Poland, 2009);
- XVIth Ukrainian festival of sacred music “From Christmas to Christmas” ( Ukraine, 2009);
- 56th European competition-festival in Neerpelt (Belgium, 2008);
- IV International Festival-Competition “Moscow-city of peace” (Russia, 2006);
- VIII Children's Choral Contest after G.Struve: “Artekovskie Zorie” (“Artek Dawn”, Ukraine, 2005).

Since 2008 the choir joined the European Association of Boys Choirs. Concert tours of the boys and youth choir: Poland (2004), Luxembourg (2008), Spain (2010 ), Italy (2013 ). Together with the Symphony Orchestra of the National Radio Company of Ukraine made recordings on Ukrainian radio. Participated in the annual festivals of the National Union of Composers of Ukraine “Musical Premieres of the Season”, “Kyiv Music Fest”. Also implemented a number large-scale art projects, including A. Karamanov's “Symphonic Gospel”, G.Mahler's Symphony No. 3, Karl Orff's “Carmina Burana”. Created choirs: “Coro Ortodoxo”, “Kyiv Singers” which toured in Spain (2011) and Algeria (2012, 2013 ). Conducted at numerous stages:

- Moscow International House of Music (Moscow, Russia);
- The Hall of the Russian Gnesin Academy of Music (Moscow, Russia);
- Teatro Principal, Teatro Monumental (Madrid, Spain);
- Auditorio de Zaragoza (Zaragoza, Spain);
- Algerian National Theatre, the Palace of Arts “Mufdi Zakaria” (Algeria).

In 2012-2013 held master classes at the National Institute of Music of Algeria. In 2013 was invited as choirmaster of the Vth International festival of symphonic music in Algeria.

== Awards ==
- Excellence in Education of Ukraine (1999).
- Diploma of the Ministry of Culture and Tourism of Ukraine “for the hard work and professionalism” (2012 );
- Diploma of Poltava Regional State Administration “For significant contributions for the development of national culture and professional excellence” (2008 );
- Diploma of the State Department of Intellectual Property “for great creative achievements, active popularization of the intellectual achievements in the field of Choral Singing” (2005 );
- Diploma of the Ukrainian Orthodox Church “for promoting of the conservation and enhancement

of the spiritual treasures of Orthodoxy” (2005 );

- “For the preservation and revival of the Orthodox Church Choirs Art” (2005).

== Publications ==
- “Choral Music in Italy during the 20- 30s of XX century”.
- “Goffredo Petrassi. The path to professionalism”.
- “Dramatic madrigal and its revival in works of G. Petrassi”.
- “Choral works of G. Petrassi in terms of his religious outlook”.
- “Echoes of the Renaissance”.
- “Psalm IX by G. Petrassi in the context of the neo-madrigalism”.
- Anatoly Laschenko “History of the Kiev Choir School”.

== Links ==
- http://old.sobor.in.ua/node/1481
- http://2010.orthodoxy.org.ua/node/25407
- http://2010.orthodoxy.org.ua/node/24999
