= Anton Grăjdieru =

Moldovan journalist and politician

Member of the Supreme Soviet of the Soviet Union
- In office 1989–1991

Personal details
- Born: September 27, 1936 Sîngerei, Bălți County, Kingdom of Romania
- Died: 2007 Chișinău, Moldova
- Party: Popular Front of Moldova

Anton Grăjdieru was a journalist and politician from the Republic of Moldova. He served as a member of the Supreme Soviet of the Soviet Union.

He was the first editor in chief of the Romanian language program on Radio Kiev. Also, he was editor in chief of Învăţămîntul public in Chişinău; on 18 September 1988 the newspapers published the Letter of the 66, an important call for a return to the Latin alphabet.

In 1989, Anton Grăjdieru was elected as a member of the Supreme Soviet of the Soviet Union. He played an important role in the movement for the independence of Moldova from the Soviet Union and advocated for the reunification with Romania. He founded the newspaper Neamul Românesc (Romanian nation), serving as its chief editor.

== See also ==
- Politics of Moldova
