= Recording House of Radio Ukraine =

Coordinates: 50.4349°N 30.5352°E

Recording House of Radio Ukraine (Ukrainian: Будинок звукозапису Українського радіо) is a sound recording and concert complex of Radio Ukraine, which is a part of Suspilne, the Ukrainian national broadcaster, located in Kyiv. The Large Concert Studio of the Recording House enables the recording of big orchestras and choirs, it is one of the largest sound recording studios in Europe.

The Recording House serves as the rehearsal base and the main concert venue for the following ensembles of Radio Ukraine:

- Ukrainian Radio Symphony Orchestra
- Ukrainian Radio Choir Chapel
- Ukrainian Radio Orchestra of folk and popular music
- Big Children Choir of Ukrainian Radio
- Ukrainian Radio Trio of Bandurists

== History of construction and specifications ==
The design of the studio was developed in 1962, while construction lasted from 1967 to 1972. It is one of the five largest recording studios in Eastern Europe, all of which were built based on the same project. Similar recording studios have been built in Bratislava, Moscow, Budapest, and Tashkent.

Built specifically to record large orchestral and choral ensembles, the record house has unique acoustic parameters and remains today the largest professional specialized sound recording and concert complex of Ukraine with the largest symphonic stage space. The volume of the Large Concert Studio is 9800 m^{3}. In addition to the Large Concert Studio, the Recording House has several other studios of different size and functions, which are equipped with advanced digital equipment.

== Cultural significance ==
For several decades, the leading vocalists of Ukrainian music scene have recorded music in studios of the Recording House of Radio Ukraine. In particular, the first records of Sofia Rotaru, Nazariy Yaremchuk, Volodymyr Ivasyuk, Vasil Zinkevych were created here.

Along with prominent vocalist soloists, are also recorded masterpieces performed by prominent conductors and instrumentalist soloists of different eras: Igor Oistrakh, Sviatoslav Richter, Konstantin Simeonov, Natan Rakhlin, Stepan Turchak, Mykola Petrov, Volodymyr Krainev, Mykola Suk, Oleh Krysa, Liana Isakadze, Ada Rogovtseva, Bohdan Stupka, and many others. Prominent actors such as Ada Rogovtseva, Bohdan Stupka, Natalia and Olha Sumski, Bohdan Beniuk, Anatoliy Khostikoyev, Anatoliy Palamarenko and many others created a national anthology of Radio Ukraine theater.

The Radio Ukraine audio archive, created due to work of the Recording House, has over 110,000 records.

== See also ==
- Recording studio
- Audio engineering
- Ukrainian Radio Symphony Orchestra
- Radio Ukraine
- Suspilne
