= Suspilne Uzhhorod =

Ukrainian regional TV channel

Suspilne Uzhhorod Суспільне Ужгород
- Country: Ukraine
- Headquarters: Uzhhorod, Ukraine

Programming
- Language(s): Ukrainian
- Picture format: 16:9 (576i, SDTV)

Ownership
- Owner: Suspilne

History
- Launched: November 2005
- Former names: Zakarpattia ODRK, Tysa-1, UA:Zakarpattia

Links
- Website: https://uz.suspilne.media/

Suspilne Uzhhorod (Ukrainian: Суспільне Ужгород), is a regional Ukrainian-language TV channel for Zakarpattia Oblast (region) of Ukraine. It is part of Suspilne, the national public broadcaster. It is the brand name of the Transcarpathian Regional Television and Radio Company. Its headquarters is situated in Uzhhorod.

It is broadcast through Astra 4A, 4.8E, Freq. 12672, Pol. H, S/R 3300, FEC 3/4; Astra 1G, 31.5E, DVB-S2, Freq. 12012, Pol. V, S/R 27500, FEC 9/10, and it can be viewed in most of Europe. Today, the channel has permission to broadcast 24 hours a day.

== History ==
- Founded in 1968 under a name Zakarpattia ODRK (Ukrainian: обласна державна телерадіокомпанія (ОДРК), romanized: oblasna derzhavna teleradiokompania, lit. 'Regional State Broadcasting Company').
- In 1991—2018 consisted of a television channel Tysa-1 (Тиса-1) and a radio channel Tysa FM (Тиса FM).
- In September, 2006 it became the first Ukrainian regional TV channel broadcasting through satellite.
- On 23 November 2018 changed name from Tysa-1 to UA:Zakarpattia (UA:Закарпаття).
- On 23 May 2022 changed name to Suspilne Uzhhorod.
