= Radio Ukraine International =

International broadcasting service of Ukraine

- Type: Radio network
- Country: Ukraine

Ownership
- Owner: Suspilne
- Key people: Nataliia Kyshchuk (Editor-in-chief of the Foreign languages broadcasting dept.)

History
- Launch date: 1 November 1950; 75 years ago (as Radio Kiev)
- Former names: Radio Kiev (1950–1992)

Coverage
- Availability: International

Links
- Website: ukr.radio/progs.html?channelID=4 (in Ukrainian)

Radio Ukraine International, abbreviated RUI, is the official international broadcasting station of Ukraine, with foreign language news and programming being produced by Radio Ukraine's main editorial department for broadcasting in European Broadcasting Union languages. RUI broadcasts in Belarusian, Bulgarian, Gagauz, Hungarian, Romanian and Slovak. The Ukrainian language programming aired on RUI is produced by the domestic station Ukrainian Radio.

Radio Ukraine International provides listeners with up-to-date information in a format of short podcasts.

== Broadcast platforms ==
- Online (see External Links)
- Medium waves - in Europe on 1386 kHz from 21:00 until 03:30 UTC via Lithuania's Radio Baltic Waves International

== Former daily English language program schedule ==
- Monday: News, Ukrainian Perspective, Insight, Reading Lounge.
- Tuesday: News, Ukrainian Perspective, Panorama, Famous Ukrainians.
- Wednesday: News, Ukrainian Perspective, Highlights, Reading Lounge.
- Thursday: News, Ukrainian Perspective, Close Up, Start Ups.
- Friday: News, World.ua, Roots.
- Saturday: News, Ukrainian Diary, Hello from Kyiv, Sports and Fun.
- Sunday: News, Ukrainian Diary, Music from Ukraine.

== Former English language program details ==
- "Close Up" Analytical program of International political and economical aspirations and perspectives of Ukraine.
- "Famous Ukrainians" - Essays about outstanding people of Ukraine, poets, musicians, scientists, scholars, and historical figures.
- "Hello from Kyiv" - Listeners letters question and answer program, musical requests, entertaining commentaries.
- "Highlights" - Program about Ukrainians, their aspirations and life style.
- "Insight" - Program about Ukraine, its people, spiritual, and day-to-day life.
- "Music from Ukraine" - Musical concert of different genres each week.
- "News" - A current news report begins each broadcast.
- "Panorama" - Program about the most important trends in Ukrainian cinematography, literature, music and social projects.
- "Reading Lounge" - Readings of literary works by famous Ukrainian writers and poets.
- "Roots" - Cultural, educational, and history programs including the feature "Ukraine Land of the Cossacks"
- "Sports and Fun" - Program about sports shaping our bodies and lives, and people who dare to push the limits.
- "Start Ups" - Program about cutting-edge ideas and grass root initiatives in Ukraine.
- "Ukrainian Diary" - Digest of the most important news and events of the past week.
- "Ukrainian Perspective" - Daily in depth digest of the day's news, and commentary of current affairs.
- "World.ua" - Review of Ukrainian and International press releases.

== History of RUI on shortwave radio ==
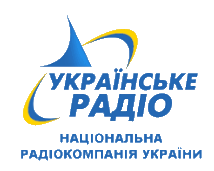
Former logo

Radio Ukraine International began operation in March 1992 as the first International broadcast station of independent Ukraine. Formally known as Radio Kiev, a "sister" station to Radio Moscow during the Soviet era. Interval signal is music of the "Bandura".

Operated multiple high power transmitters using directional phased antenna arrays. Offers distinctive QSL cards to shortwave listeners for swl dx signal reception reports. Provided clear channel reception on frequencies in the 41-meter, 31-meter, 25-meter, and 19-meter shortwave bands.

Shortwave broadcasts were terminated in December 2010 from the lack of state support and funding. Since then the radio station is now taking the first steps in multimedia development with a new website on the World Wide Web with information in text, sound and images from and about Ukraine and Ukrainians.

=== Radio Kiev and Ukrainian Radio ===
In the 1920s and 1930s, due to the lack of accurate or reliable information, Radio Kiev or the Kiev Radio was a common name used outside of Ukraine for shortwave broadcast stations located within the Ukrainian Soviet Socialist Republic. The Wireless World guide of 1935 reported station RW20 operating from Kharkov in eastern Ukraine on a longwave frequency of 385 kHz with power of 10 kW broadcasting in Russian. With the onset of World War II in 1941 and the subsequent Nazi occupation of the Ukrainian S.S.R. radio broadcast stations were captured and removed from service. At the end of World War II, during 1946, radio broadcasting began to revive and the World Radio guide of 1946 reported the following stations on the air in Ukraine:

- Kiev 1 on 248 kHz with 120 kW power
- Kiev 2 on 832 kHz with 35 kW power
- Kharkov on 385 kHz with 10 kW power
- Odessa on 968 kHz with 10 kW power
- Dnepropetrovsk on 913 kHz with 10 kW power

On 1 November 1950, Radio Kiev was formally introduced and transmitted its first broadcasts in the Ukrainian language only. These broadcasts were intended to reach the Ukrainian diaspora via shortwave radio, with frequencies in the 31-, 25-, and 19-meter shortwave bands using high power amplitude modulated (AM) transmitters with omni-directional antennas. In October 1962 Radio Kiev introduced its first English language program broadcast schedule with daily transmissions on various shortwave frequencies. These transmissions originated from multiple transmitting sites employing high power Russian made (KOM) transmitters and gain type "steerable" antenna systems capable of the precision directing of radio broadcasts to desired regions worldwide. In 1966 German language programming was introduced, followed by Romanian language broadcasts in 1970, along with additional transmitting sites. By the late 1970s the following transmitting sites were active full-time on various time and frequency schedules within the territory:

- Kyiv region (Brovary) - 1 site of 15 kW, 4 sites of 100 kW, and 5 sites of 200 kW
- Mykolaiv region (Kopani) - 2 sites of 100 kW, 2 sites of 250 kW, and 4 sites of 1000 kW
- Lviv region (Krasne) - 3 sites of 200 kW, 2 sites of 1,000 kW
- Kharkiv region (Kharkiv) - 3 sites of 100 kW
- Odesa region (Odesa) - 2 sites of 100 kW

== See also ==
- Radio Ukraine, the publicly funded radio broadcaster in Ukraine.
