= Dmitry Khorkin =

Ukrainian TV and radio host

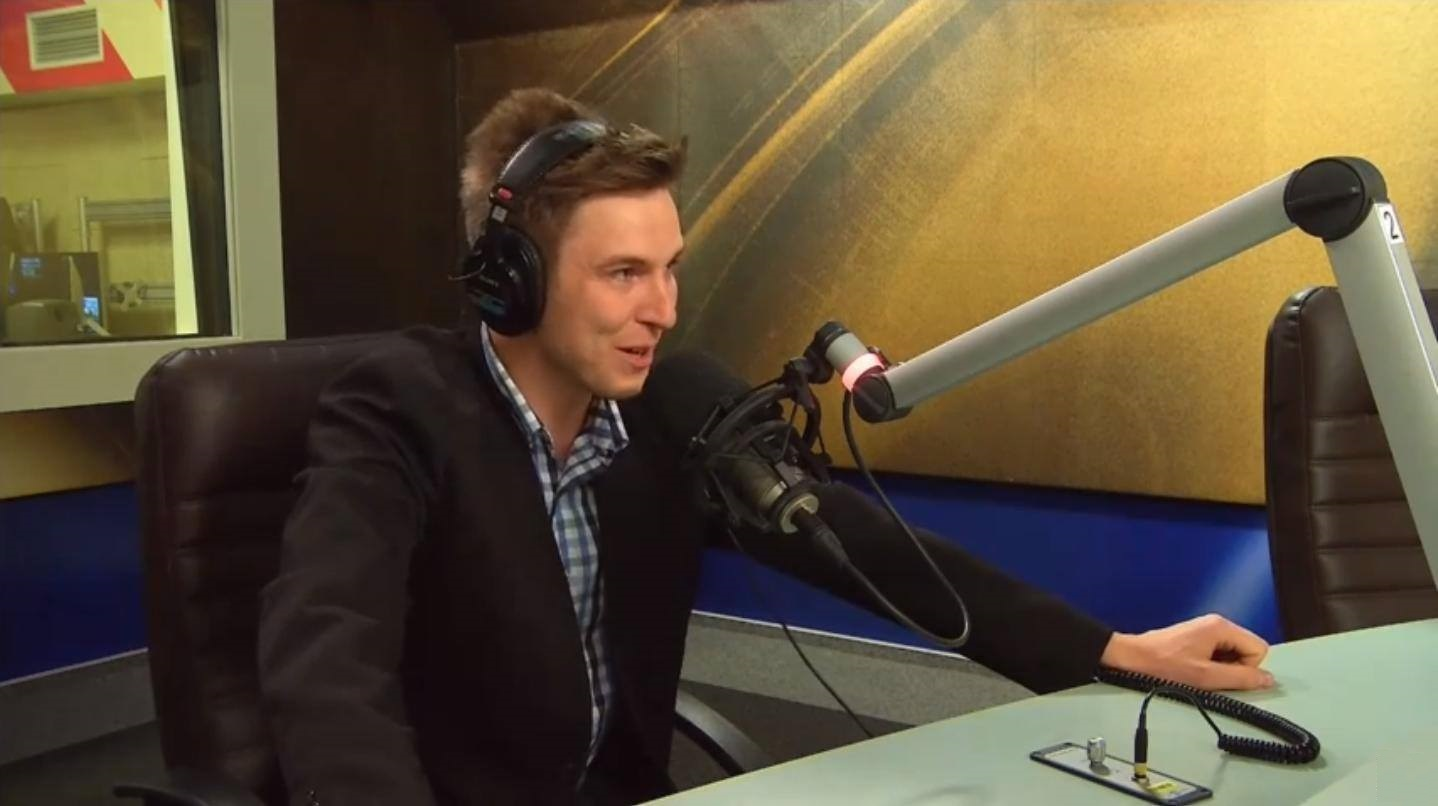
Dmitry Khorkin in a radio studio, 2015

Dmitry Khorkin (also transliterated as Dmytro Khorkin, Ukrainian: Дмитро́ Микола́йович Хо́ркін Dmytro Mykolayovych Khorkin; born 9 March 1986) is a Ukrainian television and radio host and media manager, general producer of Ukrainian Radio. He is the main voice (narrator) of official events in Ukraine, well known as the voice of military parades. Merited artist of Ukraine. Board member of the National Public Broadcasting Company of Ukraine.

== Biography and career ==
Dmitry Khorkin was born on 9 March 1986 in Torez (now Chystiakove), Donetsk region, Ukraine.

Graduated from National Pedagogical Dragomanov University.

Works at Ukrainian Radio since 2004.

=== Voice of official events and over-voice actor ===
Dmytro Khorkin is the main voice (narrator) of the official events of Ukraine, announcer and narrator of the military parades for Independence Day and Victory Day on Independence Square in Kyiv in 2011, 2012, 2014, 2015, 2016, 2017, 2018, 2019. Khorkin's voice became remarkable for official events with the participation of the country's top officials and for supporting the Ukrainian army, that's why he had received threats from pro-Russian separatists before the 2016 military parade.

He also used to work as an over-voice actor for Ukrainian TV channels – his voice is spoken by the characters of drama films, documentaries, advertising on channels: ICTV, Tonis, Channel 5, First National, TVi and others.

=== Media manager ===
In 2017 he became the General Producer of Ukrainian Radio as a part of the National Public Broadcasting Company of Ukraine (UA:PBC). Under his leadership, the broadcast schedules of 3 national radio channels were completely relaunched. As a result, the weekly coverage of Ukrainian Radio increased by 67% in 9 months of the first media season, and the First Channel of Ukrainian Radio had been ranked in the TOP-5 national radio stations by news listening rating, according to Internews (in previous years it was not even in TOP-10). Also, he has launched new digital radio services. The Atlantic Council noticed, that the transformation of Ukrainian public radio, led by Dmitry Khorkin, is proof that a public service outlet is not doomed in Ukraine.

In 2019 he was appointed a Member of the Managing Board of the UA:PBC, Head of Radio.

=== Academic and teaching activities ===
Associate professor of the Taras Shevchenko National University of Kyiv, Institute of Journalism.

In 2015, he headed the Kyiv Political and Business Rhetoric School, advising political parties. Author of training programs for election candidates.

=== Honors ===
Merited artist of Ukraine (2018).
