= Volodymyr Sheiko =

Ukrainian conductor (born 1962)

Volodymyr Sheiko Shevchenko National Prize laureate
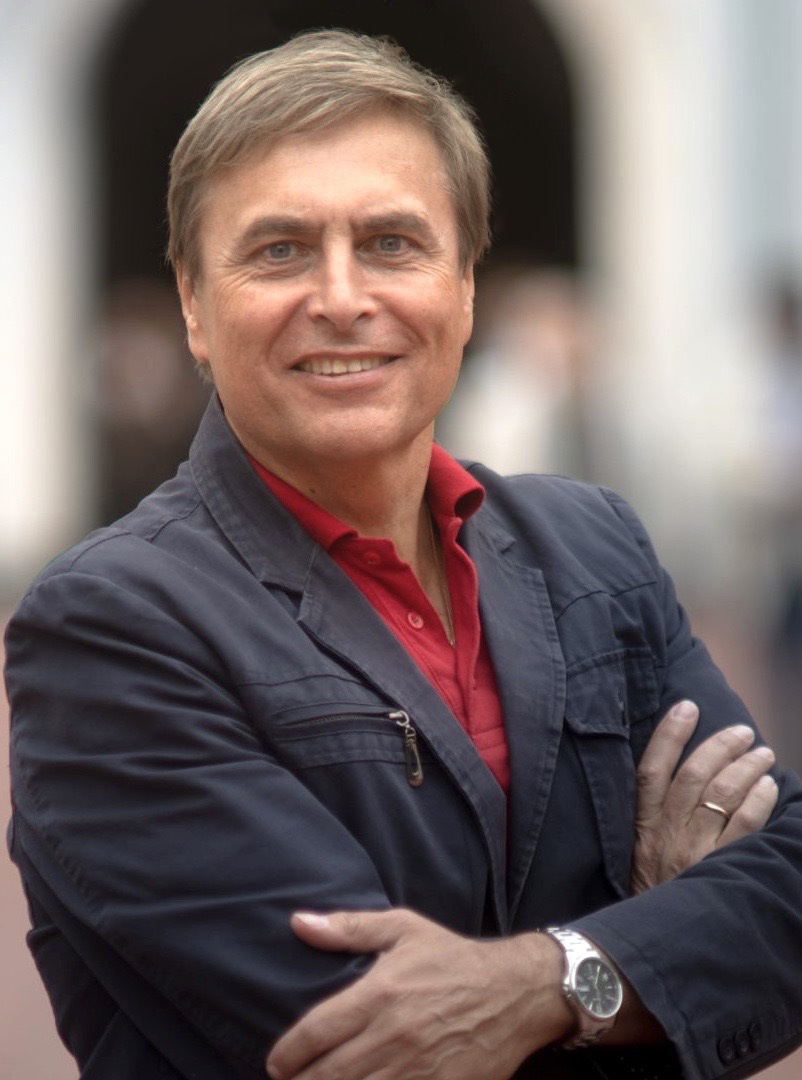
- Born: Volodymyr Sheiko; 11 January 1962 (age 64); Kharkiv, Ukraine
- Education: Kyiv Conservatory
- Occupation: Conductor
- Organizations: KC; SOKNATO; URSO
- Website: vladimirsheiko.com

Volodymyr Oleksandrovych Sheiko (born January 11, 1962, Kharkiv) is a Ukrainian conductor, Honored Artist of Ukraine, People's Artist of Ukraine, the director of the Association "Music," and the chief conductor of the Ukrainian Radio Symphony Orchestra.

== Biography ==
He was born in Kharkiv.

=== Education ===
In 1981 he graduated from Poltava State Music School named after MV Lysenko as a choirmaster and music theorist.

In 1988 he graduated from the Tchaikovsky Kyiv State Conservatory with a degree in opera and symphony conducting (Prof. Stefan Turchak) and choral conducting (Prof. Lev Venediktov).

In 1989-1991 he was an intern at the Bolshoi Opera and Ballet Theater (Moscow), directed by Fuat Mansurov.

=== Creative activity ===
Soon after his graduation in 1988, he founded the new "Ukraine" Symphony Orchestra and as its leader and music director went on tours all over Europe performing and making numerous radio and TV recordings and CD productions. During that period he co-organized the "Tenoratorio" Festival in Solothurn, Switzerland, and found the international Music Festival "Meetings at Easter" in Kyiv in 2000. He also participated in the opening of Verdiano – 2001 Festival in Busseto, Italy in 2001.

The years of 1994 -2005 were dedicated mostly to theatre. Volodymyr Sheiko conducted large opera productions and projects in oratorical genres, among them: Yevgeniy Onegin by P. Tchaikovsky; La Traviata and Rigoletto by G. Verdi; Porgy and Bess by G. Gershwin; Carmen by G. Bizet; The Tsar's Bride by N. Rymsky-Korsakov; Il Barbiere di Siviglia by G. Rossini; Cosi fan tutti, Impressario and Le nozze di Figaro by W. A. Mozart; Requiem by G. Verdi; Requiem by M. Reger; Requiem by G. Fauret; Magnificat by J. S. Bach.

In 2005 he was appointed his current position as music director and chief conductor of the Ukrainian Radio Symphony Orchestra.

Under Volodymyr Sheiko’s direction, the orchestra has presented many performances, among them: "Requiem" by G. Verdi; Symphony No. 9 by L. V. Beethoven; Symphony No. 6, "Pathétique" by P. Tchaikovsky; Symphony No. 2 by S. Rachmaninoff; "Carmina Burana" by Carl Orff; "Stabat Mater" by G. Rossini; "The Execution of Stepan Rasin" by D.Shostakovich; "St. Jonn of Damascus" by S.Taneev; "When the Fern Blooms" by Y. Stankovych; "Requiem" and "Davidde Penitente" by W.A. Mozart; "Le Poème del'extase" by A. Scriabin, "Symphonic Gospel" by Alemdar Karamanov.

During his artistic leadership, Volodymyr Sheiko founded a series of joint musical projects of the Radio Company and National Television Company of Ukraine, such as: “Art Stories”; "RadioSymphony_UA"; “Symphonic Mainstream” and “Message from Ukiraine”, and made more than 500 recordings of world and Ukrainian musical masterpieces for the National Radio Fund. Volodymyr Sheiko brought the Radio Symphony Orchestra to more than a dozen countries across the world; South Korea, United Arab Emirates, Iran, Algeria, Tunisia, Spain, Italy, Switzerland, France, Portugal, Netherlands, Luxemburg, Belgium, Romania, Poland and Belarus, to name a few, and to such renowned stages as: Konzerthaus Wien; Concertgebouw in Amsterdam, Koningen Elisabethzaal in Antwerpen; Arena Sferisterio in Macerata, Italy; Teatro Carlo Felice in Genova; Teatro Petruzzelli in Bari; Teatro Ponchielli in Cremona; Teatro Luciano Pavarotti in Modena; Teatro Romano in Ascoli Piceno, Italy; Teatro Politeamo Garibaldi in Palermo; Teatro Auditorium Manzoni in Bologna; Teatro Gesualdo in Avellino, Italy; Stadtcasino Musiksaal Basel, Switzerland; Auditorio Nacional de Musica, Teatro Monumental in Madrid; Palau de la Musica Catalana in Barcelona; Auditorio de Zaragoza, Teatro Principal in Zaragoza, Spain; Casa da Musica; Coliseu do Porto in Porto, Portugal; Coliseu dos Recreios in Lisbon; Coliseum in Nimes, France; Teatro Romano in Vienne, France; Bucharest National Opera; Romanian National Opera in Timisoara; Algerian National Theatre, Palace "Moufdi Zakaria", Algiers Opera House in Algeria; Seoul City Hall; Coliseum in El Jem, Tunisia; Amphitheater in Cartage, Tunisia; Tunisian National Opera; Hong Kong City Hall; National Philharmonic of Beijing, China; Dubai Opera, in United Arab Emirates.

== Distinctions ==
- In 2003 he was awarded the honorary title of "Honored Artist of Ukraine" - for significant personal contribution to the socio-economic and cultural development of the capital of Ukraine - the city of Kyiv.
- In 2005 he was awarded the Order of Saint Vladimir III degree
- In 2005 he was awarded the Diploma of the Verkhovna Rada of Ukraine
- In 2012 he was awarded the Diploma of the Cabinet of Ministers of Ukraine
- Honorary award of the Ministry of Culture of Ukraine
- "Badge of Honor" of the Kyiv City Council
- In 2015 he was awarded the honorary title of "People's Artist of Ukraine"
- In 2019, he won the Shevchenko Prize in the category "Musical Art" - for audio recordings of works by Ukrainian composers at the Ukrainian Radio Foundation, and concert programs from 2013 to 2018.
- In 2020 he was awarded the Order of Merit (Ukraine), III class
- In 2021 became corresponding member of the National Academy of Arts of Ukraine

=== Nominations ===
Taras Shevchenko National Prize of Ukraine 2015. Concert programs of 2009-2014 were nominated for the Concert and Performing Arts nomination: 160 concerts, each of which became a notable spiritual and educational event, highlighted the active artistic and social position of the artist and received a wide positive public response. In particular, some of the largest concert cycles of the artist were music media projects "Art Stories" and "RadioSymphony_UA," where Volodymyr Sheiko participated as artistic director, project conductor, project developer, and director.
