= Suspilne Kharkiv =

Suspilne Kharkiv Суспільне Ужгород
- Country: Ukraine
- Headquarters: Kharkiv, Ukraine

Programming
- Language: Ukrainian
- Picture format: 16:9 (576i, SDTV)

Ownership
- Owner: Suspilne

History
- Launched: 23 February 1951
- Former names: UA:Kharkiv

Links
- Website: Official website

Suspilne Kharkiv (Ukrainian: Суспільне Ужгород), is a regional Ukrainian-language radio station and TV channel for Kharkiv Oblast (region) of Ukraine. It is part of Suspilne, the national public broadcaster. It houses the oldest radio station in Ukraine (founded in 1924) and the oldest television station in Ukraine outside of Kyiv (founded in 1951).

== History ==
Radio broadcasts began on 16 November 1924, at 7pm, with the following message: "Hello, hello, this is Kharkiv calling! Everybody! Everybody! Everybody! The first radiotelephony station in Ukraine is on air". Created by enthusiasts, the station's equipment, gifted from the commander of the troops in Ukraine and Crimea, consisted of two wagons covered with horse blankets. These blankets were used to line the studio. The Kharkiv radio station was reportedly heard in other key European cities, such as Berlin, Paris, Vienna, Rome, Poznań, Copenhagen; at their request, the German agency "Radio Express" published the station's listings, because they thought that its signal was easier to receive than the station owned by the Great Comintern, near Moscow.

At noon on 22 June 1941, the station informed its listeners over the beginning of Operation Barbarossa.

Radio broadcasts resumed after the war; in 1951, it also conducted its first television broadcasts, which were conducted on 23 February 1951; later on 7 May a regular broadcast was made with the phrase "Attention! Kharkiv speaks and sees". This TV center became a full-scale one on 19 March 1955, replacing the amateur center.

On 6 June 2018, the station, formerly known as OTB, was renamed UA:Kharkiv.

At around 11:20am on 14 April 2019, the station started broadcasting on the international FM band on 106,1 FM; the former OIRT FM broadcasts on 67,13 MHz shut down on 21 May 2019 at 6:07pm.

On 14 May 2019, widescreen broadcasts began.

The name changed to Suspilne Kharkiv on 23 May 2022.

From 20 November to 18 December 2022, it aired the 2022 FIFA World Cup.
