= Suspilne =

Public broadcaster of Ukraine

Suspilne Ukraine

- Native name: Національна суспільна телерадіокомпанія України
- Industry: Broadcasting; mass media
- Founded: 8 April 2015; 11 years ago
- Headquarters: Kyiv, Ukraine
- Area served: Worldwide
- Key people: Mykola Chernotytskyi (chairman of the board)
- Products: TV shows; news; web portals; video production; digital media
- Brands: Pershyi; Radio Ukraine; Suspilne Sport; Suspilne Kultura; Suspilne Novyny; Suspilne Regional; Radio Promin; Radio Culture; Radio Ukraine International
- Services: Broadcast; radio; television; Internet; printing
- Revenue: 45,524,000 hryvnia (2025)
- Total assets: 5,365,255,000 hryvnia (2025)
- Owner: State Committee for Television and Radio-broadcasting
- Number of employees: 794,262 (2025)
- Website: corp.suspilne.media

The National Public Broadcasting Company of Ukraine (Ukrainian: АТ "Національна суспільна телерадіокомпанія України", romanized: AT 'Natsionalna Suspilna Teleradiokompaniia Ukrainy', NSTU), also known as Suspilne (Ukrainian: Суспільне, pronounced [sʊˈs⁽ʲ⁾pilʲne], lit. 'Public [Broadcasting]') or previously UA:PBC, is the national public broadcaster of Ukraine. The company was registered in that status on 19 January 2017.

Suspilne Ukraine is an independent media company with a strong presence across all platforms: the TV channels Pershyi, Suspilne Kultura, Suspilne Sport, and a national network of local channels; the radio stations Ukrainske Radio, Radio Promin, Radio Kultura, Radiotochka. The company also runs its own online news portal suspilne.media, as well as national and local digital platforms. The company also leads broadcasts in minority languages. Suspilne serves as Ukraine's representative at the Eurovision Song Contest. The company provides training for media professionals through the Public Media Academy. Suspilne Mediateka platform offers unique video and audio archives dating from the 1920s to today.

From 1995 until its current name, the television predecessors of the current broadcaster was named the National Television Company of Ukraine (NTU; Національна Телекомпанія України, Natsionalna Telekompaniia Ukrainy). Ukrainian Radio (Ukrainian: Українське радіо, romanized: Ukrainske radio) was its radio predecessor and a stand-alone company until it merged with NTU to be the first public broadcasting company of Ukraine.

Radio broadcasts in Ukraine, at the time part of the USSR, began in Kharkiv in 1924, and a nationwide radio network was initiated in 1928. (In the first years of the USSR Kharkiv was the capital of Ukraine, from December 1919 to January 1934, after which the capital relocated to Kyiv.) In 1965 the first nationwide Ukrainian television channel Ukraiinske Telebachennia or UT (lit. 'Ukrainian TV') was established. (Ukraine was part of the USSR from 1920 until it declared its independence on 24 August 1991.)

The broadcaster was rebranded to Suspilne Ukraine on 5 December 2019, with the new brand identity presented on 23 May 2022.

== Overview ==
Suspilne Ukraine is a public joint-stock agency with 100% of its shares belonging to the state, and operates the television channel Pershyi, the only Ukrainian TV channel that has a coverage over 97% of Ukraine's territory and is the only state-owned national channel. Its programs are oriented at all social layers of the Ukrainian society and national minorities.

Its radio division Ukrainian Radio is the biggest radio network in the country, which broadcasts on FM (covers 192 settlements in 24 regions) and AM, satellite and cable networks throughout Ukraine, and is the most popular news and talk radio station in Ukraine.

Among priority directions of the network are informative publicism, popular scientific, culturologic, entertaining and sport-oriented ones. Pershyi, at one point, significantly trails all of its privately owned rival channels in terms of viewership. The National Television Company of Ukraine (NTCU) was changed to Public Television Network in 2009. The network consists of several channels such as Pershyi, "Second Channel", "Euronews Ukraine" and "Ukraine and the World". In 2014, a new law was passed to make the network independent from the government. With the creation of the Public Broadcasting Company of Ukraine in 2015, the National Radio Company of Ukraine merged into this new company, which was officially registered on 19 January 2017.

On 20 January 2025, coinciding with a change of Suspilne's Chair, JICA donated an outside broadcasting van and other equipment to the broadcaster.

== Television ==
Currently the Suspilne television network is organized as follows:

- Pershyi ("First channel") – News, analytics, talk-shows, interviews and documentary films. Also included the program "Week. Crimea".
  - Suspilne Crimea (Autonomous Republic of Crimea and Sevastopol) (also available on satellite Astra 4A)
- Suspilne Sport ("Second channel") – Sport (include live events), reviews, morning weekend programs about the life of national communities from Suspilne Regional. Also included the program "Week. Region" on Suspilne Regional channels only.
  - Suspilne Cherkasy (formerly Ros) (Cherkasy Oblast)
  - Suspilne Chernihiv (formerly Siver) (Chernihiv Oblast)
  - Suspilne Chernivtsi (formerly Bukovina) (Chernivtsi Oblast)
  - Suspilne Donbas (formerly DoTB in Donetsk Oblast and LOT in Luhansk Oblast) (Donetsk and Luhansk oblasts)
  - Suspilne Dnipro (formerly 51) (Dnipropetrovsk Oblast)
  - Suspilne Ivano-Frankivsk (formerly Karpaty) (Ivano-Frankivsk Oblast)
  - Suspilne Kharkiv (formerly OTB) (Kharkiv Oblast)
  - Suspilne Kherson (formerly Skifiya) (Kherson Oblast)
  - Suspilne Khmelnytskyi (formerly Podillya-Centr) (Khmelnytskyi Oblast)
  - Suspilne Kyiv (formerly Centralnyi Kanal) (Kyiv and Kyiv Oblast)
  - Suspilne Kropyvnytskyi (formerly Kirovohrad) (Kirovohrad Oblast)
  - Suspilne Lviv (formerly TRC Lviv) (Lviv Oblast)
  - Suspilne Mykolaiv (formerly Mykolaiv) (Mykolaiv Oblast)
  - Suspilne Odesa (formerly ODT) (Odesa Oblast)
  - Suspilne Poltava (formerly Ltava) (Poltava Oblast)
  - Suspilne Rivne (formerly RTB) (Rivne Oblast)
  - Suspilne Sumy (Sumy Oblast)
  - Suspilne Ternopil (formerly TTB) (Ternopil Oblast)
  - Suspilne Vinnytsia (formerly Vintera) (Vinnytsia Oblast)
  - Suspilne Lutsk (formerly Nova Volyn) (Volyn Oblast)
  - Suspilne Uzhhorod (formerly UA:Zakarpattia, Tysa-1) (Zakarpattia Oblast)
  - Suspilne Zaporizhzhia (formerly Zaporizhzhia) (Zaporizhzhia Oblast)
  - Suspilne Zhytomyr (formerly Zhytomyr) (Zhytomyr Oblast)
- Suspilne Kultura – Thematic channel (de facto a back-up of the channels Pershyi and Suspilne Sport)

== Digital media ==
The current logo for Suspilne Novyny (Suspilne News).

- Suspilne Novyny – news portal
- Suspilne Regional – news portal from Suspilne Regional networks
- Suspilne Sport – sport portal
- Suspilne Kultura – portal about culture, lifestyle, cinema, music and other thematics in actual and historical context
- Suspilne Mediateka – portal with video- and audio-archives

== Radio ==
Suspilne broadcasts on 3 national and 1 international radio channels: Radio Ukraine (First Channel, UR-1), Radio "Promin", Radio "Culture" and Radio Ukraine International. The regional branches have their broadcasting slots in the broadcast schedule of the First Channel of Ukrainian Radio. General producer of Ukrainian radio channels since 2017 is Dmytro Khorkin.

Radio Ukraine Directorate of the Suspilne is a structural subdivision of the company, which integrates four broadcasting channels, the studios of Radio House and the House of Recording of Ukrainian Radio, and 5 radio ensembles.

Radio Ukraine broadcasts on FM and AM, satellite and cable TV-networks throughout Ukraine. Also it has mobile app suspilne.radio for Android and iOS.

=== Radio channels ===
- Radio Ukraine – the first channel of public Ukrainian Radio. The most popular news and talk radio station in Ukraine. Also it is the biggest FM radio network in the country.
- Radio Promin – the second channel of public Ukrainian Radio. Music radio station.
- Radio Culture – the third channel of public Ukrainian Radio. Cultural and educational radio station.
- Radio Ukraine International – international radio service in Belarusian, Slovak, Romanian, Gagauz and Bulgarian languages.

=== Studio complexes ===
- Ukrainian Radio House – is a studio complex located at 26 Khreschatyk str, Kyiv. It's a broadcasting center for four channels of Ukrainian radio.
- Recording House of Radio Ukraine – is a concert and studio complex in Kyiv. Large Concert Studio of the Recording House allows to record large orchestral and choral groups and is one of the largest such studios in Europe. The Recording House also serves as a rehearsal and concert venue for radio orchestras and ensembles of Ukrainian Radio.

=== Radio ensembles ===
Radio ensembles are instrumental or vocal bands – i.e. radio orchestra – employed by public service broadcasters around the world, whose main tasks are to create stock records for broadcasting on public radio stations, as well as to promote national culture. The following radio ensembles are a part of Suspilne:

- Ukrainian Radio Symphony Orchestra
- Ukrainian Radio Capella Choir
- Ukrainian Radio Folk Music Orchestra
- Ukrainian Radio Big Children's Choir
- Ukrainian radio Trio of Bandurists

== Managers ==
=== Presidents (1995–2010) ===
- 1 June 1995 – 21 August 1996: Oleksandr Savenko
- 21 August 1996 – 18 November 1996: Zynoviy Kulyk (interim)
- 18 November 1996 – 1 October 1998: Viktor Leshyk
- 5 October 1998 – 17 November 1998: Mykola Kniazhytskyi
- 17 November 1998 – 21 June 1999: Zynoviy Kulyk
- 21 June 1999 – 15 July 1999: Oleksandr Savenko (interim)
- 16 July 1999 – 19 November 2001: Vadym Dolhanov
- 19 November 2001 – 28 March 2003: Ihor Storozhuk
- 28 March 2003 – 25 February 2005: Oleksandr Savenko (second term)
- 25 February 2005 – 8 September 2005: Taras Stetskiv
- 27 October 2005 – 18 February 2008: Vitaliy Dokalenko
- 25 February 2008 – 17 March 2010: Vasyl Ilyashchuk

=== Directors general (2010–16) ===
- 17 March 2010 – 20 February 2013: Yehor Benkendorf
- 20 February 2013 – 24 March 2014: Oleksandr Panteleymonov (interim)
- 25 March 2014 – 1 November 2016: Zurab Alasania

=== Chairs of the board (2017–present) ===
- 18 January 2017 – 13 May 2017: Hanna Bychok (acting)
- 13 May 2017 – 24 June 2019: Zurab Alasania
- 10 May 2019 – 30 June 2019: Mykola Chernotytskyi (acting)^{1}
- 1 July 2019 – 26 April 2021: Zurab Alasania
- from 27 April 2021: Mykola Chernotytskyi

Notes

1.The Supervisory board of Suspilne Ukraine decided to break the contract with Zurab Alasania effective 6 May 2019. However Alasania took vacation and thus his firing was postponed. Nevertheless both Alasania for the period of his vacation and the Supervisory Board after breaking of the contract with him assigned Mykola Chernotytskyi as acting chairman of the board. Alasania has been later renewed on his position by Shevchenkivskyi District court of the city of Kyiv.

== Current management ==
- Iryna Slavinska, editor-in-chief
- Hryhoriy Tychyna, producer, Suspilne TV
- Ievhen Chyzh, producer, Radio Ukraine
- Victoria Murovana, producer, Suspilne Digital Media platforms
- Khrystyna Havrylyuk, producer, Suspilne Info

== Logos ==
2015–2017

2017–2020

2020–2022

2020–2022, English version

Current logo as of 2022

Since 2022, English variant.

== See also ==
- Television in Ukraine
