= Suspilne Kultura =

Ukrainian public cultural TV channel

- Country: Ukraine
- Broadcast area: Ukraine; Worldwide (in 80 countries and via Internet)
- Headquarters: Kyiv, Ukraine

Programming
- Language: Ukrainian
- Picture format: 1080i HDTV (downscaled to 16:9 576i for the SDTV feed)

Ownership
- Owner: Suspilne
- Sister channels: Pershyi; Suspilne Sport

History
- Launched: 2002
- Former names: Kultura (Note: Ukrainian: Культура, lit. 'Culture') (2002 – 2017); UA:Kultura (Note: Ukrainian: UA:Культура, lit. 'UA:Culture') (8 August 2017 – 24 May 2022)

Links
- Website: suspilne.media/culture

Availability

Terrestrial
- Zeonbud: MX-1 (4)
- KRRT: MX-7 (46)

Suspilne Kultura (Ukrainian: Суспільне Культура, lit. 'Public [broadcasting] Culture') is a Ukrainian public TV channel showcasing culture in Ukraine, operated by the Public Broadcasting Company of Ukraine.

== History ==
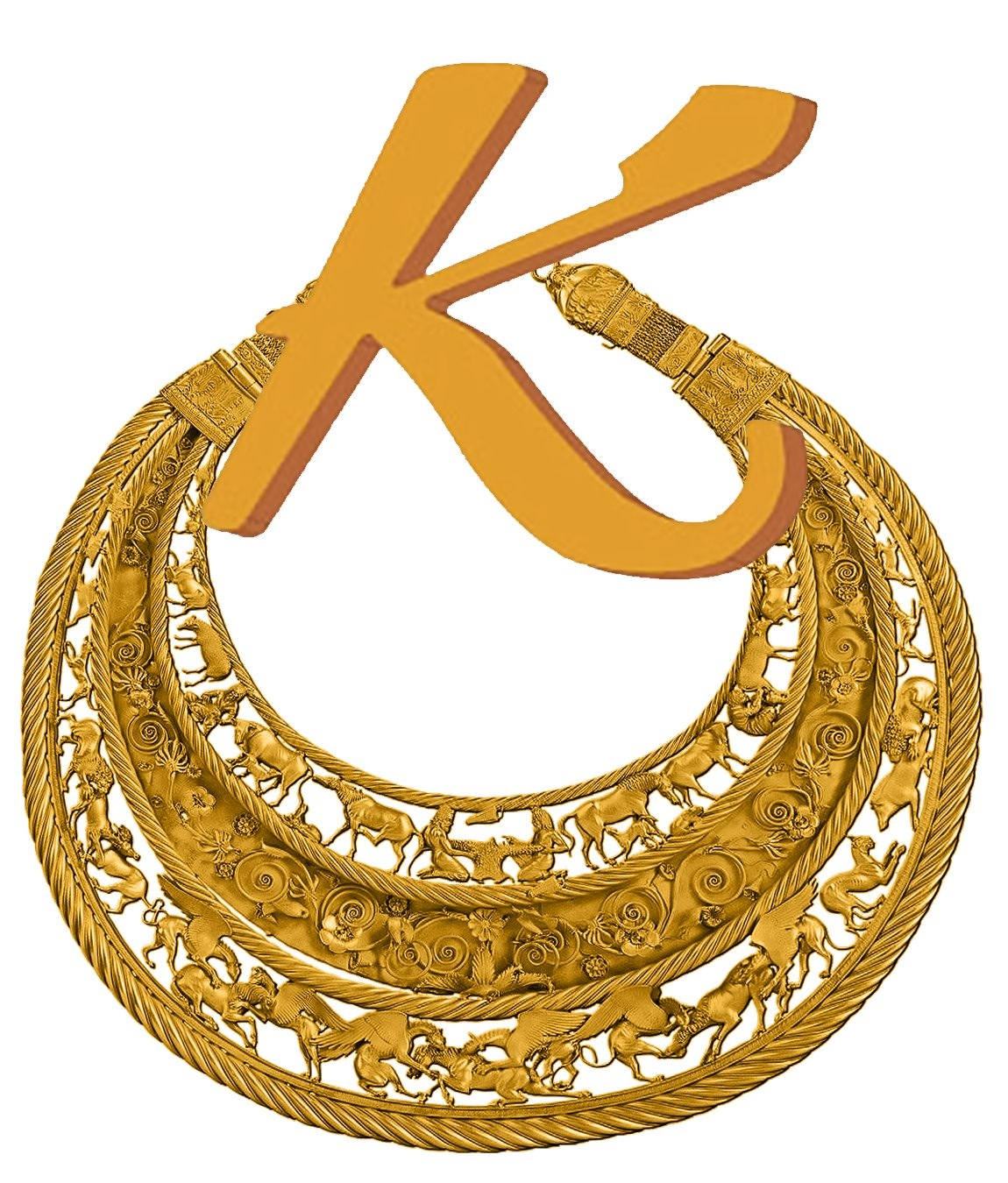
Original logo (2002—2017)

The State Television and Radio Broadcasting Company "Culture" emerged in Ukraine in 2002 as part of the State Committee of Television and Radio of Ukraine. It was first broadcast on the First National and Second National channels. In November, 2004 STRBC "Culture" was granted a license from the National television and broadcasting Council of Ukraine permitting it round-the-clock satellite broadcasting for a period of ten years.

From September, 2005 STRBC "Culture" broadcasts over the cable network of Kyiv and the regions of Ukraine, and since May 2006 broadcasts via satellite to more than 80 countries.

With the declaration of war and the Russian invasion of Ukraine, from 24 February to 27 March 2022, it only broadcast the United News Marathon all day, without commercials.

On 28 March 2022, the channel restored its independent programming and started broadcasting in high definition.

On 24 May 2022, the channel was renamed from UA: Kultura to Suspilne Kultura and uses purple as its identifying color.

== Content of the broadcast ==
1. Language of broadcasting (as a percentage ratio): Ukrainian 100%;
2. Own production share: 12 hours per day (50%);
3. Minimum share of national audiovisual product (own production as well): 21 hours 36 minutes per day (90%);
4. Maximum share of foreign audiovisual product: 2 hours 24 minutes per day (10%);
5. Theme: culture.

== Genre distribution ==
=== Analysis ===
- News of Culture. Cultural and art life of Ukraine: premieres, exhibitions, book presentations, museum news, art events, etc. Coverage of state processes, consolidation of society, European integration.
- Milestones of our history. Programs about outstanding cultural, political and public events and people of the past.

=== Culture and art ===
- Open soul — about contemporary Ukrainians (including Ukrainian Diaspora) – people of different professions, masters of their work, living not only for themselves...
- In the artist's studio. Acquaintance with the modern Ukrainian artists
- Cinema addict — news about native non-commercial movies. History of Ukrainian cinema of the late 20th and early 21st century
- Theater stories — Ukrainian theater, past and current
- Literature mosaic — featuring works of writers and poets
- Photo — art critics talk about photographs as a phenomenon of scientific and technical progress

=== Science and education ===
- Outstanding Ukrainians — notable artists, writers, scientists, patrons, government and public figures
- Memory guard — stories about museums, archives and libraries of Ukraine
- Temple — history and revival of monasteries, temples and religious schools. Sacred art as an inseparable component of the national cultural treasure
- Dialog — famous writers, artists, scientists, politicians about modern state of culture
- Our land — towns and villages of Ukraine. History and present. Architecture, culture and nature.

=== Entertainment and music ===
- Philharmonic evenings — classical music concerts
- Artist — portraits of artists: musicians, singers, performers, dancers
- Music kaleidoscope — festivals, contests, concerts, artists. Meetings with performers and composers

=== Programs for children ===
- Rainbow — youth achievements in the creative and educational field. Children mastering folk crafts and cultural traditions. Children with unique abilities. Homeless children, orphanage.
- Youth and time — young creative talents, modern culture and rising to prominence experience

== Address ==
State television and radio broadcasting company “Culture” Ukraine, 02660, Kyiv, Melnykova str., 42.
