= Ukrainian Radio =

Public radio broadcaster of Ukraine

Українське радіо
- Type: Radio network
- Country: Ukraine

Ownership
- Owner: Suspilne (NPBC of Ukraine)
- Sister stations: Radio Promin; Radio Kultura
- Key people: Dmytro Khorkin (General producer)

History
- Launch date: 16 November 1924; 101 years ago
- Former names: National Radio Company of Ukraine (official name, 1924-2017)

Coverage
- Availability: International

Links
- Website: ukr.radio suspilne.radio

Ukrainian Radio (Ukrainian: Українське радіо, romanized: Ukrainske Radio) is the publicly funded radio broadcaster in Ukraine since 1924. In 2017 its parent company National Radio Company of Ukraine merged with national TV company into the country's public broadcaster Suspilne. Until the creation of the National Public Broadcasting Company (NPBC) of Ukraine, the NRCU was an independent company. General producer of Radio Ukraine's channels since 2017 is Dmytro Khorkin.

Ukrainian Radio Directorate of Suspilne is a structural subdivision of the company, which integrates five broadcasting channels, the studios of Radio House and the Recording House of Radio Ukraine, and five radio ensembles.

16 November is celebrated as the Day of Radio, Television and Communications Workers in Ukraine in honor of the start of broadcasting of the Ukrainian Radio in 1924.

Ukrainian Radio broadcasts on AM, FM, satellite, cable TV-networks throughout Ukraine, the Internet and DAB+ (only in Kyiv). It also uses FM-OIRT and cable radio network, but its usage is being phased out in favour of FM, digital broadcasting and the Internet. Also it has mobile app suspilne.radio for Android and iOS.

== History ==
Radio broadcasts in Ukraine, at the time part of the USSR, began in Kharkiv on 16 November 1924, and a nationwide radio network was initiated in 1928. (In the first years of the USSR Kharkiv was the capital of Ukraine, from December 1919 to January 1934, after which the capital relocated to Kiev, together with headquarters of Ukrainian Radio.)

Programs in the Ukrainian language were initially limited in time and content – more than 70% were political education and agitation: radio newspapers, reports, conversations, news, conferences and meetings. Later the programs of radio stations in Ukraine were extended with music, literature and drama programs for children and youth.

During the World War II, Ukrainian Radio never ceased its operations. At first it had to return to Kharkiv, then to Stalingrad, and later to Saratov, from where regular Ukrainian language broadcasts were conducted.

Today's residence of the Ukrainian Radio at 26 Khreschatyk str. in Kyiv was built in 1949–1951 at the first national TV and radio center, fully equipped with domestic equipment. On 6 November 1951, the first TV broadcast came out of its studio. Ukrainian TV was located there until the 1990s, then moved to new TV-center "Pencil", so residence on Khreschatyk remained the headquarters of radio.

During the USSR period, the State Committee on Television and Radio Broadcasting of the Ukrainian SSR had conducted the broadcasting on the channels of the Ukrainian Radio. In the early 1990s, the committee was transformed into the State Broadcasting Company of Ukraine. In 1995, the National Radio Company of Ukraine was isolated from the State Broadcasting Company of Ukraine. In 1995–2016 the National Radio Company of Ukraine was a state-owned company. In 2017 has been merged with National TV company into country's national broadcaster Suspilne.

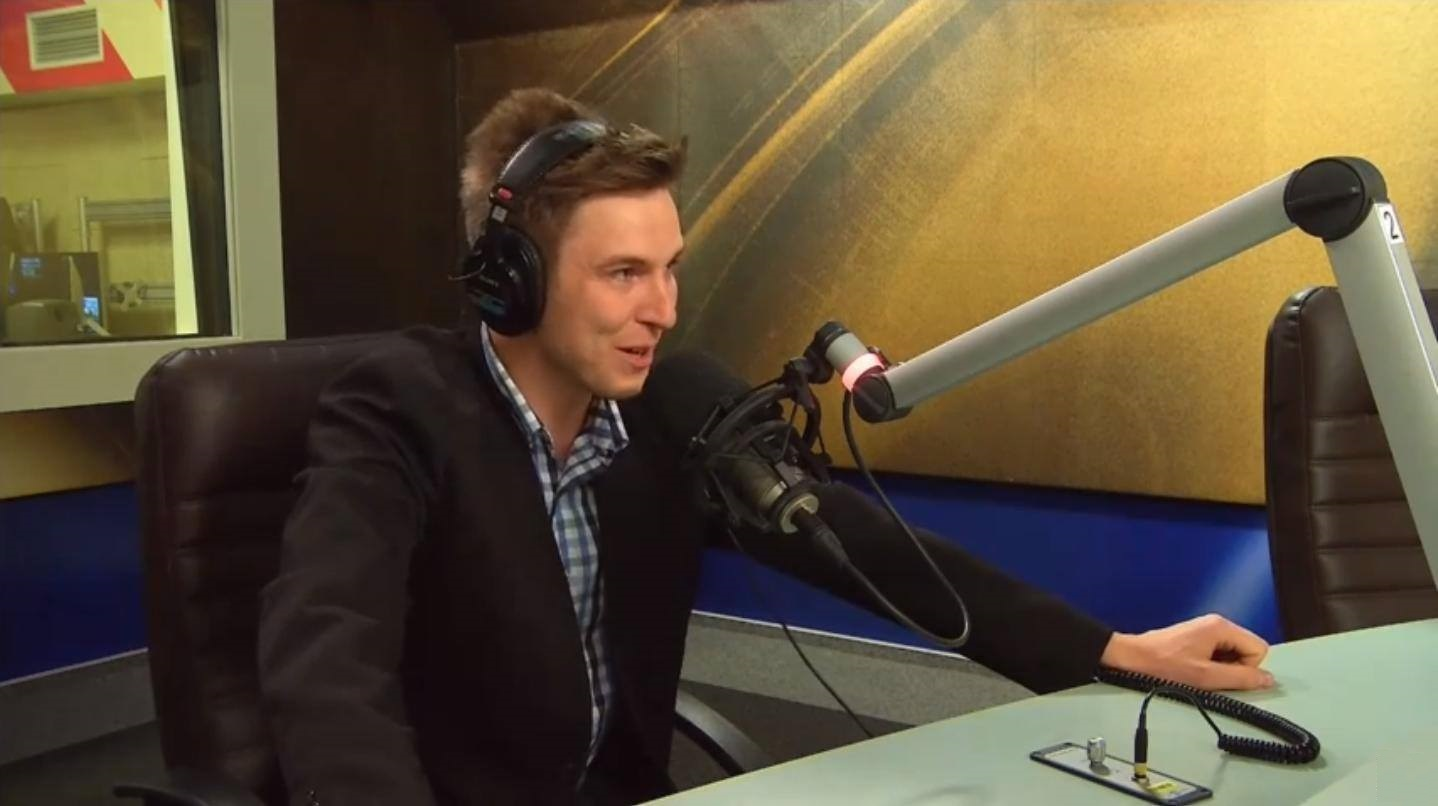
Dmitry Khorkin, Head of Ukrainian Radio since 2017

Since June 2017, the Directorate of Ukrainian Radio is headed by Dmytro Khorkin.

16 November is celebrated as the Day of radio, television and communications workers in Ukraine in honor of the start of broadcasting of the Ukrainian radio in 1924.

Ukrainian Radio is the most popular news and talk radio station in Ukraine. Also it is the biggest FM radio network in the country: 192 settlements in 24 regions. It is a news and current affairs channel that also features literary and musical programmes, programmes for children and youth. Ukrainian Radio also broadcasts live sessions of the Ukrainian parliament (the Verkhovna Rada). In 2018, it entered the Top 5 nationwide radio stations in the news listening rating, according to Internews.

== Sister stations ==
- Radio Promin (UR-2) – the second channel of public Ukrainian Radio, on air since 1965. Music and talk radio station. Information-musical youth channel deals with the most urgent problems of young people in Ukraine, in particular it helps to get oriented towards choosing one's trade, informs of the most important events in the life of youth, acquaints with modern Ukrainian music.
- Radio Culture (UR-3) – is the third channel of public Ukrainian Radio, on air since 2003. Cultural and educational radio station. Channel of spiritual rebirth Radio "Kultura" which is basically aimed at creating in domestic radio space a special environment of high spiritual culture involving mass listeners' audience.
- Radio Ukraine International (RUI) – is an international service in Belarusian, Bulgarian, Gagauz, Romanian, Slovak and Ukrainian. RUI prepares a digest of the most important developments of the Russo-Ukrainian War.
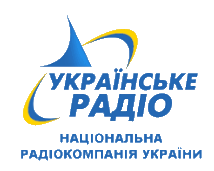
Former logo

2017-2022

Logo since 2022

English variant.

== Digital services ==
Ukrainian Radio has its mobile app suspilne.radio for Android and iOS.

== Studio complexes ==
- Ukrainian Radio House – is a studio complex located at 26 Khreschatyk street in Kyiv, built in 1949–1951. It is a broadcasting center for 4 channels of Ukrainian radio.
- Recording House of Radio Ukraine – is a concert and studio complex in Kyiv. Large Concert Studio of the Recording House allows to record large orchestral and choral groups and is one of the largest such studios in Europe. The Recording House also serves as a rehearsal and concert venue for radio orchestras and ensembles of Ukrainian Radio.

== Radio ensembles ==
Radio ensembles are instrumental or vocal bands — i.e. radio orchestra – employed by public service broadcasters around the world, whose main tasks are to create stock records that sound on public radio stations, as well as to promote national culture.

The following radio ensembles are a part of NPBC:

- Ukrainian Radio Symphony Orchestra
- Ukrainian Radio Choir Chapel
- Ukrainian Radio Orchestra of folk and popular music
- Big Children Choir of Ukrainian Radio
- Ukrainian Radio Trio of Bandurists

== See also ==
- Anton Grăjdieru, first editor in chief
- Ukrainian Radio Symphony Orchestra
- Recording House of Radio Ukraine
