= Pershyi =

Ukrainian national television channel

- Country: Ukraine
- Broadcast area: Ukraine
- Headquarters: Kyiv, Ukraine

Programming
- Language: Ukrainian
- Picture format: 1080i HDTV (downscaled to 16:9 576i for the SDTV feed)

Ownership
- Owner: Suspilne
- Sister channels: Suspilne Regional; Suspilne Sport; Suspilne Kultura

History
- Launched: 6 November 1951; 75 years ago
- Former names: Ukrainske Telebachennia (Note: Ukrainian: Українське Телебачення, lit. 'Ukrainian Television') (6 November 1951 – 5 March 1992); UT-1 (Note: Ukrainian: УТ-1.) (6 March 1992 – 6 February 1998); Pershyi Natsionalnyi (Note: Ukrainian: Перший Національний, lit. 'First National') (7 February 1998 – 7 April 2015); UA:Pershyi (Note: Ukrainian: UA꞉ Перший, lit. 'UA:First'.) (8 April 2015 – 23 May 2022)

Links
- Website: suspilne.media/news/schedule/tv/

Availability

Terrestrial
- Zeonbud (Ukraine): MUX-1 (1)
- KRRT (Ukraine): MUX-7 (47)

Streaming media
- Web: https://suspilne.media/news/schedule/tv/ (Ukraine only)

Pershyi (Ukrainian: Перший [ˈpɛrʃɪj] , lit. 'First') is a Ukrainian public television channel, operated by Suspilne.

It is the only Ukrainian TV channel covering over 97% of Ukraine's territory. Its programs are oriented toward all levels of Ukrainian society and national minorities. Among priority directions of the network are information, popular science, culture, entertainment and sports.

== History ==
Headquarters and studios in 2017

The station's history traces back to the first experiments on February 1, 1939; regular broadcasts started on November 6, 1951. It was the third television station to be established in the USSR, after St. Petersburg (at the time Leningrad) and Moscow, both under the Russian SSR, and the first outside of it.

In its current form, it was launched in 2015 as the main TV channel of the newly created public broadcaster. The channel has replaced Pershyi Natsionalnyi (Ukrainian: Перший національний, First National), the state-operated TV channel that traced its origin to the Soviet UT (Ukrainian: Українське телебачення, Russian: Украинское телевидение, Ukrainian Television) and after dissolution of the Soviet Union, UT-1. The channel's anniversary has always been November 6, the anniversary of its first broadcast in 1951.

Pershyi is neither influenced by the state nor by Ukrainian oligarchs, which makes it one of the most transparent and reliable media outlets in Ukraine. The channel has a series of journalistic investigations related to corruption in Ukrainian politics, including incidents that were related to the incumbent (at the time) presidents Petro Poroshenko and Volodymyr Zelenskyy.

In 2019, the channel planned to change its name to Suspilne TV (Ukrainian: Суспільне ТБ, Public Television) as a part of rebranding process of the public broadcaster. However, this idea was later dismissed by the Supervisory Board of Suspilne, who decided to keep the name Pershyi after the rebranding. The channel changed its logo and visual identity to the current on May 23, 2022.

It began broadcasting in high definition (HD) on April 12, 2022.

Because of the Russian invasion of Ukraine, from February 24, 2022 to May 21, 2024, the TV channel broadcast the informational marathon "United News". There was no advertising on the air.

On May 21, 2024, the TV channel partially resumed independent broadcasting, expanding the information block of content — it broadcasts its own informational marathon "Suspilne. Studio", as well as on regional channels of Public Broadcasting. In addition, own informational telethon is part of "United News". The move came as part of an indecision over whether or not the main channel should continue broadcasting United News all day or to bring back its own programming after two years.

== Logos ==
From 1991 to 1995, the logo was in the bottom-right corner and then (1995–1997) the logo was in the top left corner. From 1997–2022, it was in the top right corner. The logo returned to top left corner starting from 2022.

- From March 6, 1992 to August 23, 1997, the logo was a large-type УТ-1 and was white and semitransparent. It was on bottom right corner (until 1995) and later switched to the top left corner. It disappeared during news and advertisements in 1991–92 and 1995–96 respectively.
- From August 24, 1997 to February 6, 1998, the logo was a red-green-blue triangle that remotely resembled a diagonal one. It was on top right corner.
- From February 7, 1998 to August 23, 2005, the logo was white and transparent vertical line and was white and semitransparent. Its on-screen display position remained unchanged.
- From August 24, 2005 to March 31, 2006, the logo was white, was included in a ring with white boundary paths and red background. Its on-screen display position remained unchanged.
- From April 1, 2006 to August 31, 2008, the logo was white, was included in a ring with white boundary paths and a transparent background. The logo was white and non-transparent. Its on-screen display position remained unchanged.
- From September 1, 2008 to June 6, 2014, the logo is white and transparent and was the Ukrainian word ПЕРШИЙ, meaning first. Its on-screen display position remained unchanged.
- From June 7, 2014 to April 6, 2015, the logo is white and transparent and was the Ukrainian word ПЕРШИЙ and miniature of Ukrainian flag. Its on-screen display position remained unchanged.
- From April 7, 2015 to May 23, 2022, the logo is white and was a large-type UA꞉ПЕРШИЙ (with the colon in colours of the Ukrainian flag until April 2016). Its on-screen display position remains unchanged. Since broadcasting into 16:9 format, the logo become smaller and letters are translucent. The ꞉ is not translucent.
- From May 23, 2022, the logo is a semicircle, near which the inscription "FIRST" is written in Ukrainian. White logo. It is located in the top left corner.
December 25, 1991 to August 23, 1997

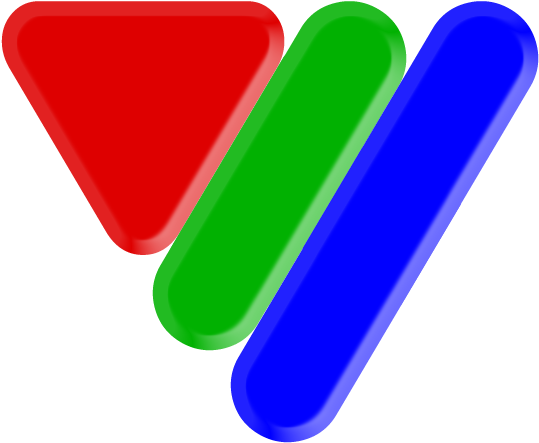
August 24, 1997 to February 6, 1998

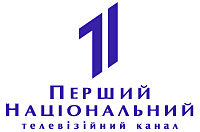
February 7, 1998 to August 23, 2005

August 24, 2005 to March 24, 2006

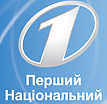
March 25, 2006 to August 31, 2008

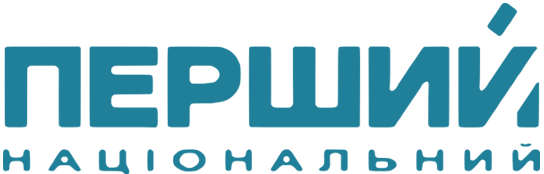
September 1, 2008 to April 6, 2015

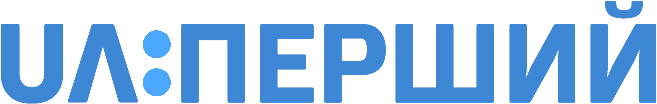
April 7, 2015 to December 9, 2017

December 10, 2017 to May 23, 2022

May 23, 2022 — present

== Satellite television ==
- Satellite: Amos (4.0°W)
- Standard: DVB-S
- Frequency: 11175
- Personal: Horizontal
- Speed: 30000
- FEC: 3/4
- Image: MPEG-4
- Audio: MPEG L-2
- Code: BISS
- Satellite: Amos (4.0°W)
- Standard: DVB-S
- Frequency: 12297
- Personal: Horizontal
- Speed: 45000
- FEC: 3/4
- Image: MPEG-4
- Audio: MPEG L-2
- Code: FTA

== See also ==
- Eastern Bloc information dissemination
