= Ukrainian Radio Symphony Orchestra =

- Radio orchestra
- Former name: Ukrainian Radio-Center Orchestra (1929); Honored Symphony Orchestra of the State Radio and Television of the Ukrainian SSR (1961); Honored Symphony Orchestra of the National Radio Company of Ukraine (1995)
- Founded: 1929; 96 years ago
- Location: Kyiv, Ukraine
- Concert hall: Recording House of Radio Ukraine
- Principal conductor: Volodymyr Sheiko
- Website: Official website

The Ukrainian Radio Symphony Orchestra (Note: Ukrainian: Симфонічний оркестр Українського радіо, romanized: Symfonichnyi orkestr Ukrainskoho radio; previously NRCU Symphony Orchestra, Симфонічний оркестр НРКУ, Symfonichnyi orkestr NRKU) is the broadcast orchestra of the Ukrainian Radio since 1929. Now the orchestra is a part of the national public broadcaster Suspilne.

The rehearsal base and the main concert venue of the orchestra is the Recording House of Radio Ukraine, located in Kyiv.

== History ==
The newly created orchestra of Ukrainian Radio-Center at that time, first performed in public October 5, 1929, which was followed by critical acclaim and to date is considered an important moment of Ukrainian cultural history. The best musicians of Ukraine's former capital city Kharkiv were invited to join the orchestra conducted by Yakiv Rozenshteyn. The orchestra of 45 musicians was part of the radio theatre. Its first symphonic cycle featuring works by Pyotr Ilyich Tchaikovsky started soon after opening October 14 with his 5th symphony and 3rd orchestral suite.

Due to political shifts and intern transitions the orchestra eventually moved to Ukraine's new capital Kiev and increased its number to 60 musicians. Soon becoming the only government supported symphony orchestra exclusively devoted to symphony music the orchestra continued in broadcasting, public concerts and recording for Ukraine and worldwide music labels. Especially its video-recordings proved to be highly commercially successful as the concerts being regarded national cultural highlights and added to the funds of Ukrainian Radio.

The orchestras achievements in preserving the musical tradition of Ukraine in particular and Eastern Europe in general, producing over 10.000 recordings of orchestral works have been met by getting awarded the title of Honored Collective and granted academic status for special merits in the development of musical art in Ukraine.

Throughout the years the orchestra collaborated with world famous conductors such as Mykola Kolessa, Natan Rakhlin, Theodore Kuchar, Aram Gharabekian and several others – as well as toured all across Europe and Asia including Germany, Italy, France, Spain, Poland, South Korea, Iran and Algeria.

== Conductors ==
- Yakiv Rosenstein
- Peter Adler
- Mykhailo Kannerstein
- Petro Polyakov
- Konstantin Simeonov
- Vadym Gnedash
- Volodymyr Sirenko
- Viatcheslav Blinov
- Volodymyr Sheiko
