= KJNV =

K-Love radio station in Gilroy, California

- Gilroy, California; United States
- Broadcast area: San Francisco Bay Area
- Frequency: 94.5 MHz

Programming
- Format: Christian
- Network: Radio Nueva Vida

Ownership
- Owner: K-Love, Inc.

History
- First air date: January 1, 1970
- Former call signs: KPER-FM (1970–1973); KSND (1973–1975); KFAT (1975–1983); KWSS (1983–1991); KUFX (1991–1997); KBAY (1997–2003); KBAA (2003–2004); KBAY (2004-2026)
- Former frequencies: 94.3 MHz (1969–1975)
- Call sign meaning: J Nueva Vida

Technical information
- Licensing authority: FCC
- Facility ID: 35401
- Class: B
- ERP: 44,000 watts
- HAAT: 158 meters (518 ft)
- Transmitter coordinates: 37°12′31.8″N 121°46′30.8″W

Links
- Public license information: Public file; LMS
- Website: nuevavida.com

KJNV (94.5 FM) is a non-commercial radio station licensed to Gilroy, California, serving the San Francisco Bay Area, The station is owned by K-Love, Inc. and broadcasts a Contemporary Christian format.

KJNV has an effective radiated power (ERP) of 44,000 watts. The transmitter is on a hill in Santa Teresa County Park, near Coyote Peak, south of San Jose.

== History ==
The facility went on the air in 1970 as KPER-FM at 94.3. The station broadcast in Gilroy with 3,000 watts and was co-owned with KAZA (1290 AM). KAZA and KPER-FM were split in 1973; Entertainment Radio, Inc. bought the FM and changed the call letters to KSND. Entertainment Radio filed to move the station to 94.5 from Loma Prieta Peak, noting that KPFA's grandfathered signal caused interference problems. The FCC agreed. When the new station reemerged in 1975, it became KFAT in a freeform country/rock format. In 1976, the station was sold to Wheatstone Bridge Engineering Company, and in 1980, KFAT-Levin Radio acquired the station. KFAT was co-founded by Laura Ellen Hopper, Jeremy Lansman, and Lorenzo Milam, who helped start many of community radio's pioneering stations in the United States.

Harvey Levin, the majority owner of KFAT-Levin Radio, died of cancer in May 1982 at the age of 38. Levin had instructed his estate to sell KUIC in Vacaville to pay down debts and fund the continuation of KFAT, but the requested down payment on the Vacaville station was simply too high, and KFAT was sold first. Western Cities Broadcasting paid $3.6 million for the station, providing vastly improved economic results what KFAT was delivering on. On January 17, 1983, KFAT flipped to CHR as KWSS. (Santa Cruz-area station KPIG-FM was heavily inspired by the legacy of KFAT.) KWSS, which moved its studios from Gilroy to San Jose shortly after the sale, was a well-regarded hit music station in the South Bay area. Bill Kelly & Al Kline were morning hosts of the station before moving to KXXX in early 1989. Other known personalities were Steven Seaweed (KLRB, KFAT, KRQR, KSAN), Craig Hunt, John Mack Flanagan (of KFRC), Barry Beck, Larry Morgan (of KIIS-FM), Danny Miller, Tim Anthony, and Dr. Dave Lewis. In late 1986, it was acquired by Nationwide Communications.

On March 4, 1991, after stunting for three days with a loop of "Louie, Louie" by The Kingsmen, KWSS flipped to classic rock as KUFX.

The KBAY call letters were originally assigned to a UHF television station (Channel 20), based in San Francisco. KBAY-TV never signed on with this call sign; channel 20 went on the air in 1968 as KEMO, eventually becoming today's KOFY-TV.

KBAY (then at 100.3 FM), which began broadcasting on 104.5 MHz in the 1950s, rose to become the market leader in San Jose and enjoyed a sizable listenership in both the San Jose and San Francisco markets throughout the 1970s and 1980s. Its easy listening format gave way to light jazz instrumentals, and by the early 1990s, pop music was introduced. The Snell family guided the station and its sister station KEEN Country 1370 AM through the decades as United Broadcasting.

The Snells sold their two properties in 1997, and KBAY became a part of the American Radio Systems group, which included KKSJ (the former KEEN), KUFX, and KSJO. Shortly thereafter, a three-way swap of frequencies landed KBAY at 94.5 FM. KBAY then became known as "The Bay" for a couple of years. American Radio Systems merged with CBS Radio in 1998. In the early 2000s, the KBAY identity was replaced by B-94.5, "The Bee". This was an attempt to distance the station from the perceived "stigma" of its earlier life as an "elevator music" station.

In September 2003, KBAY's owner Infinity Broadcasting removed its "World Music" format, called "The Wave", from its 93.3 MHz frequency for KBAY to simulcast on it. Infinity moved the KBAY studios to San Francisco and 94.5 became legally identified as KBAA. The simulcast experiment lasted only a year much to the relief of its staff, largely from the South Bay. The 93.3 facility was sold and became KRZZ with a Regional Mexican music format, and the KBAY call letters returned to 94.5. Infinity sold KBAY and its sister station KEZR to NextMedia Group in 2005.

Effective February 10, 2014, KBAY, KEZR, and the 31 other NextMedia radio stations nationwide became part of a new broadcasting group headed by Dean Goodman called Digity LLC, an affiliate of Palm Beach Broadcasting, LLC, for a purchase price of $85 million. The company ran about 60 locally programmed stations. Effective from February 25, 2016, Digity, LLC and its 124 radio stations were acquired by Alpha Media for $264 million.

On December 16, 2016, "Sam and Lissa in the Morning" ended its run on KBAY, as Sam Van Zandt retired, and Lissa Kreisler was let to go from the station. Van Zandt had worked in radio for 50 years, and Kreisler had worked at KBAY for 29 years. The dismissal of Kreisler was much to the disapproval of listeners, and she even stated that she "wanted a few more years." The year 2016 also saw Dana Jang, KBAY program director since 2005, depart, and Ronnie Stanton, who had last worked as program director at Vancouver's CFOX-FM, take over; evening host Nicci Ross also departed the station at the same time and moved to rival KISQ. The changes came as KBAY was facing increasing competition from KOIT and KISQ in the San Francisco market. The two San Francisco stations also appear in San Jose's ratings.

During December 2016, KBAY began running liners promoting "one last present" from the station, to come at 5 p.m. on Christmas Day. Alpha Media announced on December 21 that KBAY would end its adult contemporary format after over 20 years and flip to classic hits as 94.5 Bay FM at that time.

In 2018, veteran programmer Dave Numme was appointed Program Director/Content Director for KBAY and its sister station KEZR. About the same time, the stations' studios were moved from downtown San Jose after 20 years to a South San Jose business park. Under Numme's leadership, ratings for "Bay FM" have consistently been number one in San Jose, as well as at the top of San Francisco's ratings for key demographics and dayparts. His on-air staff consists of Bruce Scott in mornings, longtime midday host Jona Denz-Hamilton, and Kirk Peffer in afternoons. Danny Miller later took over the afternoon timeslot and is also a public address announcer for the San Jose Sharks, San Jose Earthquakes and San Francisco 49ers.

In the spring of 2021, KBAY changed its slogan to "The '80s and More" and began to add more 1990s songs back to its playlist. New voice imaging was introduced along with the change. KBAY brought back Christmas music for the Holiday season after a 3-year hiatus, in December 2021, dubbing it "94.5 K-Sleigh" for the season, then returned to its classic hits format at 9 p.m. on December 25, with the first song being "Sunglasses at Night" by Corey Hart. The music was updated to focus on 1980s and 1990s hits, with a decreased emphasis on 1970s era songs.

On April 5, 2022, at 3 pm, after playing "...Baby One More Time" by Britney Spears, KBAY flipped to a country format as Bay Country, dropping live local personalities Bruce Scott mornings and Jona Denz-Hamilton, double-decade midday host. The move came ahead of the sale of KRTY to the Educational Media Foundation (EMF), which resulted in the replacement of its long-time country format with one of its Christian radio networks. The station has been simulcasting on KKDV to cover the Oakland and Berkeley areas since April 6, 2022. The first song on "Bay Country" was "What's Your Country Song" by Thomas Rhett.

From July 28–30, 2023, the station stunted with all-Taylor Swift music as "Tay Bay", in honor of the local dates on The Eras Tour at Levi's Stadium.

Alpha Media merged with Connoisseur Media on September 4, 2025. Following the ownership change, KBAY dropped the syndicated The Bobby Bones Show in favor or a local morning show.

In May 2026, Connoisseur purchased four Bay Area stations from Bonneville International, making them sister stations to KBAY and KEZR.

On July 8, 2026, Connoisseur announced that it would sell KBAY to the Educational Media Foundation for $2 million, allowing the buyer to gain a third full-powered signal in the San Jose market, joining KJLV and KWAI, which run the K-Love and Air1 networks respectively. Connoisseur stated that the KBAY call letters and intellectual property (which the seller will retain) would move to another signal in its portfolio. On July 15, it was announced the "Bay Country" format would move to KUFX ahead of the sale, with the two stations simulcasting beginning at noon on July 22 ahead of the sale closure.
