= KKDV =

Radio station in Walnut Creek, California

Simulcast of KBAY, San Jose, CA
- Walnut Creek, California; United States
- Broadcast area: Diablo Valley
- Frequency: 92.1 MHz
- Branding: Bay Country

Programming
- Format: Country
- Affiliations: Premiere Networks

Ownership
- Owner: Connoisseur Media; (Alpha Media Licensee LLC)
- Sister stations: KKIQ; KUIC; KBLX-FM; KMVQ-FM; KBAY; KEZR

History
- First air date: December 10, 1959
- Former call signs: KWME (1959–1964); KDFM (1964–1983); KINQ (1983–1987); KKIS-FM (1987–1994); KZWC (1994–1998); KFJO (1998–2004); KABL-FM (2004–2005)
- Call sign meaning: Walnut Creek is part of the Diablo Valley

Technical information
- Licensing authority: FCC
- Facility ID: 36032
- Class: A
- ERP: 3,000 watts
- HAAT: 24 meters (79 ft)
- Transmitter coordinates: 37°54′1.7″N 122°5′10.8″W
- Translator: 92.1 KKDV-FM3 (Martinez)

Links
- Public license information: Public file; LMS
- Webcast: Listen live
- Website: kbaycountry.com

KKDV (92.1 FM) is a commercial radio station licensed to Walnut Creek, California, United States, and serving central Contra Costa County. Owned by Connoisseur Media, it simulcasts the country music format of sister station KBAY, known as "Bay Country". KKDV targets listeners in the Diablo Valley who cannot get good reception from KBAY's transmitter in the South Bay.

KKDV's studios are located in Pleasanton, while the transmitter is sited in Lafayette. It utilizes a low-power booster station in Martinez, KKDV-FM3 also on 92.1 MHz.

== History ==
=== KWME and KDFM ===
The station signed on the air on December 10, 1959. Its original call sign was KWME. It was owned by Walnut Creek Broadcasters with studios on Mount Diablo Boulevard.

The call letters were changed to KDFM in 1964. It played automated beautiful music, with quarter hour sweeps of soft instrumentals with limited talk and commercials.

=== KINQ, KKIS-FM and KZWC ===
In 1983, the station changed its call letters to KINQ and switched its former easy listening format to adult contemporary. In 1986, the playlist stepped up the tempo, becoming hot AC, right after it switched its call sign to KKIS-FM to match its sister station, KKIS 990 AM (now KATD). During the fall of 1991, the station's hot AC format eased back to a mainstream adult contemporary sound, and its AM sister stationbegan simulcasting KKIS-FM.

On October 31, 1994, KKIS-AM-FM dropped the AC format. Both stations flipped to a Spanish-language talk radio format, as part of The "Z Spanish Network". Its call letters changed to KZWC.

=== KFJO, KABL-FM and KKDV ===
Between 1998 and 2004, 92.1 was KFJO, simulcasting KSJO (92.3 FM) from San Jose, as 92 KSJO; the network also included KXJO (92.7 FM) in Alameda and KMJO (92.7 FM) in Marina. The station briefly spent time as KABL-FM, a simulcast of long-time Bay Area adult standards station KABL (960 AM, now KNEW), before becoming adult contemporary station KKDV in 2005.

KKDV flipped to country music on April 6, 2022, as "Bay Country" KKDV. It is a simulcast of KBAY (94.5 FM), which is based in the South Bay.

From July 28 through July 30, 2023, KKDV and KBAY played all-Taylor Swift songs for The Eras Tour.

On May 15, 2026, Connoisseur closed on the sale of Bay Area stations KMVQ-FM, KBLX-FM, KOIT, and KUFX from Bonneville International. This made them sister stations to KKDV.

== See also ==
- KGMZ-FM KKDV call letters history
