= KKIQ =

Radio station in Livermore, California

Coordinates: 37.595°N 121.663°W

- Livermore, California; United States
- Broadcast area: East Bay area
- Frequency: 101.7 MHz
- Branding: 101.7 KKIQ

Programming
- Format: Adult contemporary

Ownership
- Owner: Connoisseur Media; (Alpha Media Licensee LLC)
- Sister stations: KKDV; KUIC; KBLX-FM; KMVQ-FM; KUFX; KBAY; KEZR

History
- First air date: May 1969 (as KYTE)
- Former call signs: KYTE (1969–1975)

Technical information
- Licensing authority: FCC
- Facility ID: 67818
- Class: A
- ERP: 4,100 watts
- HAAT: 123 meters (404 ft)
- Repeaters: 101.7 KKIQ-FM1 (Hayward); 101.7 KKIQ-FM2 (Tracy)

Links
- Public license information: Public file; LMS
- Webcast: Listen live
- Website: www.kkiq.com

KKIQ (101.7 FM) is a commercial adult contemporary radio station located in Pleasanton, California, broadcasting to the East Bay area with a main focus on Southern Alameda County.

KKIQ is owned by Connoisseur Media, which also owns KKDV 92.1 FM in Walnut Creek and KUIC 95.3 FM in Vacaville. Both KKIQ and KKDV operate from studios located in Pleasanton near Stoneridge Mall, and KKIQ has a transmitter site southeast of Livermore. It also utilizes two boosters to boost coverage: one in Hayward and one in Tracy.

== History ==
Alpha Media acquired KKIQ, KKDV, and KUIC in 2015. Alpha Media merged with Connoisseur Media on September 4, 2025.
