= KUIC =

Radio station in Vacaville, California

- Vacaville, California; United States
- Broadcast area: Sacramento Valley
- Frequency: 95.3 MHz
- Branding: 95.3 KUIC

Programming
- Format: Adult contemporary

Ownership
- Owner: Connoisseur Media; (Alpha Media Licensee LLC)
- Sister stations: KKDV; KKIQ; KBLX-FM; KMVQ-FM; KUFX; KBAY; KEZR

History
- First air date: 1970
- Former call signs: KVFS (1970–1973)
- Call sign meaning: Pronounced "quick"

Technical information
- Licensing authority: FCC
- Facility ID: 54261
- Class: B1
- ERP: 490 watts
- HAAT: 617 meters (2,024 ft)
- Transmitter coordinates: 38°23′41.6″N 122°6′0.8″W
- Repeater: 95.3 KUIC-FM2 (Vallejo)

Links
- Public license information: Public file; LMS
- Webcast: Listen live
- Website: kuic.com

KUIC (95.3 FM) is an adult contemporary radio station licensed to Vacaville, California, United States, and serves the Sacramento Valley. Its music format consists of music from the 1980s to today.

The station is owned by Connoisseur Media, which also owns KKIQ 101.7 FM in Livermore and KKDV 92.1 FM in Walnut Creek. KUIC operates from its studios in Vacaville, and its transmitter is located west of Vacaville along the Solano-Napa county line. (Sister stations KKDV and KKIQ have studios in Pleasanton.) It also utilizes a translator booster in Vallejo.

== History ==
The station was originally put on the air in 1970 as KVFS, owned by Bruce and Dennis Zieminski operating as Northern California Stereocasters. The original call sign represented the service area of Vacaville, Fairfield, and Suisun. KVFS maintained studios in a mobile home.

In 1973, the station was sold to KPOP Radio and became KUIC. The transmitter was relocated to Butcher Hill—one of the first Sparta 602 packages produced. Studios moved to the station moved to the second story of the Triangle Building, later the California Hawaii Building, then to a two-story building on East Main (Vacaville) followed by a relocation to a larger building near the corner of Davis and Mason Street. Early Triangle Building music formats were often quite varied, often selected by the current disc-jockey and for many decades, the station certainly maintained a very local down-home flavor.

Early station Chief Engineers include Tim Dineen, Steve Moore and longtime employee Alan McCarthy. In the mid 1990s, the transmitter site was relocated to Mt. Vaca, where it remains to this day. For a brief period of time (c. 1994–95), KNBA (1190 AM) in Vallejo was purchased and operated as a sister station, but not normally with the same programming. KNBA also expanded with an expanded band 1640 AM signal, which became KDIA.

KUIC, KKIQ, and KKDV were sold in 2015 to Alpha Media. Alpha Media merged with Connoisseur Media on September 4, 2025.
