= Mashore =

Mashore may refer to:

- Clyde Mashore (born 1945), former Major League Baseball outfielder who played for the Cincinnati Reds and Montreal Expos
- Damon Mashore (born 1969), Puerto Rico-born former Major League Baseball outfielder who played for the Oakland Athletics and Anaheim Angels, son of Clyde
