= KSJO =

Bollywood music radio station in San Jose, California

- San Jose, California; United States
- Broadcast area: San Francisco Bay Area
- Frequency: 92.3 MHz (HD Radio)
- Branding: Bolly 92.3

Programming
- Format: Hindi Geet
- Subchannels: HD2: South Asian "Virijallu FM"; HD3: South Asian "Punjabi Hits"; HD4: Atmospheric, Dreamy Soulful music "High-Fi Dream"

Ownership
- Owner: Sanjiv Gupta, Gregg Pirillo, and Brad Behnke; (Silicon Valley Asian Media Group, LLC)

History
- First air date: December 1946
- Former call signs: KSJO-FM (1947–1971)
- Former frequencies: 95.3 MHz (1947–1959)
- Call sign meaning: San Jose

Technical information
- Licensing authority: FCC
- Facility ID: 4117
- Class: B
- ERP: 32,000 watts
- HAAT: 136 meters (446 ft)
- Transmitter coordinates: 37°12′31.8″N 121°46′30.8″W
- Repeater: See § Booster

Links
- Public license information: Public file; LMS
- Webcast: Listen live; Listen live (HD2); Listen live (HD4)
- Website: bolly923fm.com; virijallu.com (HD2); highfidream.com (HD4)

KSJO (92.3 FM, "Bolly 92.3") is a commercial radio station licensed to San Jose, California, United States, and serves the San Francisco Bay Area with Bollywood music format. It is owned by Silicon Valley Asian Media Group, with studios on Hellyer Avenue in San Jose and transmitter sited off of Santa Teresa County Park, south of downtown San Jose.

KSJO's range is extended by low-power booster station KSJO-FM1 in Pleasanton, California. KSJO also broadcasts in the HD Radio hybrid format.

== History ==
KSJO is the second call sign assigned in San Jose, initially applied to both an AM station (now KLIV) and an FM station. The FM station began broadcasting in 1947 on 95.3 FM. By 1949, KSJO was airing on both 95.3 FM and 1590 AM. In November 1957, the Federal Communications Commission (FCC) approved KSJO-FM's application to move to 92.3 MHz. The move was made in 1959.

Ron Hayes worked for KSJO in the mid-1950s before launching his acting career.

Prior to 1968, KSJO was owned by SRD Broadcasting, consisting of Scott Elrod of San Francisco, Don Bekins of Bekins Van Lines and Richard "Dick" Garvin. As freeform rock was growing in popularity, with Tom Donahue's KMPX in nearby San Francisco becoming a national trendsetter, KSJO dropped jazz, starting in the evening only at first with Mark Williams and Jim Hilsabeck. After a few months Elrod and team brought in Bob Sobelman, a radio veteran, to GM the station and Larry Mitchell, a top L.A. program director, took over the helm. "The Light from Below" was one of the early slogans but did not live long ("below the San Francisco Bay"). The format was pure free-form progressive rock. The previous simple female-sex-symbol logo morphed into a red-white-and-blue logo and bumper sticker designed by Diane Roberts of Los Gatos, and the announcing staff was all-male for many years. Brief stint program directors included Bill Slator and Dick Kimball but for 5 plus years Douglas (Droese) was the program director, remaining so until the Sterling buy out in 1974. The station was later sold to Sterling Recreation Organization (SRO) of Seattle, Washington.

For much of its history, KSJO was locked in a bitter rivalry with KOME, which also flipped to rock in 1971. At one point, in the early 1970s (September 1974 through June 1975), KSJO briefly switched to a Top 40 format, before returning to rock. By the end of the decade, KOME had surpassed KSJO in the ratings.

The rock war heated up when stations in San Francisco started changing to the format. KSAN was the main San Francisco competitor throughout the 1970s, and more stations arrived. In the mid- to late-1970s, KSJO was known for its outrageous morning show. Advertising Director Perry White (Hartline) partnered with Michael "Mother Deal" to make morning news fun for the 'rocker' audience. With DJ Tawn Mastrey as Musical Director, KSJO helped usher in New Wave and Punk Music to the Bay Area. At one point, in late 1982, four different stations in San Francisco alone were programming the format, in addition to KSJO and KOME.

However, in 1982, led by broadcast veteran Jack Chunn, KSJO started to dominate the Rock Radio scene in San Jose (and with respectable ratings to the north in San Francisco and to the south in Monterey/Santa Cruz). Program Director Larry 'Baby Lee Roy' Hansen assembled a strong group of air personalities including Trevor Ley and Jim Taylor (mornings), Ken Anthony (afternoons), Nicki Stevens (evenings) and Jim Seagull (overnights). Combined with strong marketing and a guerrilla street presence from promotions director Bob Jenkins and assistant Rodney Whitaker, KSJO dominated as 'The Bay Area's Home for Rock & Roll' for most of the 1980s.

Narragansett Broadcasting out of Providence, Rhode Island purchased the station from Sterling Recreation Organization in 1985 and installed former KOME General Sales Manager Gary Rodriguez as General Manager. Gary Rodriguez brought in from KOME Dana Jang as Operations Manager and Michael Hernandez as Sales Manager. Laurie Roberts joined from KOME to perform morning drive along with Ted Kopulos, also a KOME mainstay. Former KOME air personality, Gary T. joined for afternoon drive with overnights performed by Dave Numme from KZAP in Sacramento.

KSJO is credited with airing the first-ever AIDS radiothon in 1987, raising $25,000 for a San Jose AIDS hospice. Considering their reputation as a macho rock station, this was a complete departure for a day, but audience response was upbeat and KSJO promoted a candid dialogue about HIV/AIDS with their 18-34 audience, the most sexually active group in the U.S. Program Director Ken Anthony and morning personality Paul 'Lobster' Wells organized the event with mid day host Zeb Norris, afternoon personality Laurie Roberts, promo director Bob Jenkins and assistants Martyn Wright and Mike Russell. Several rock stars donated their time and merchandise to help raise funds, including Neil Young, Ronnie Montrose, Mark Andes of Heart, Neal Schon of Journey, Paul Kantner of Jefferson Airplane and Jimmie Vaughan of the Fabulous Thunderbirds.

By 1994, KOME had flipped to modern rock and KSJO was the stand-alone AOR station in Santa Clara Valley. Also, many of the San Francisco rock stations had long changed to different formats as well. KSJO rode a wave of popularity during the decade due primarily to the appeal of morning personalities Lamont and Tonelli. By 1998, KSJO's signal was simulcast on three other separate stations (located near 92.3 on the dial) around the San Francisco Bay Area: 92.7 KXJO in Alameda/Oakland, 92.7 KMJO in Marina and 92.1 KFJO in Walnut Creek.

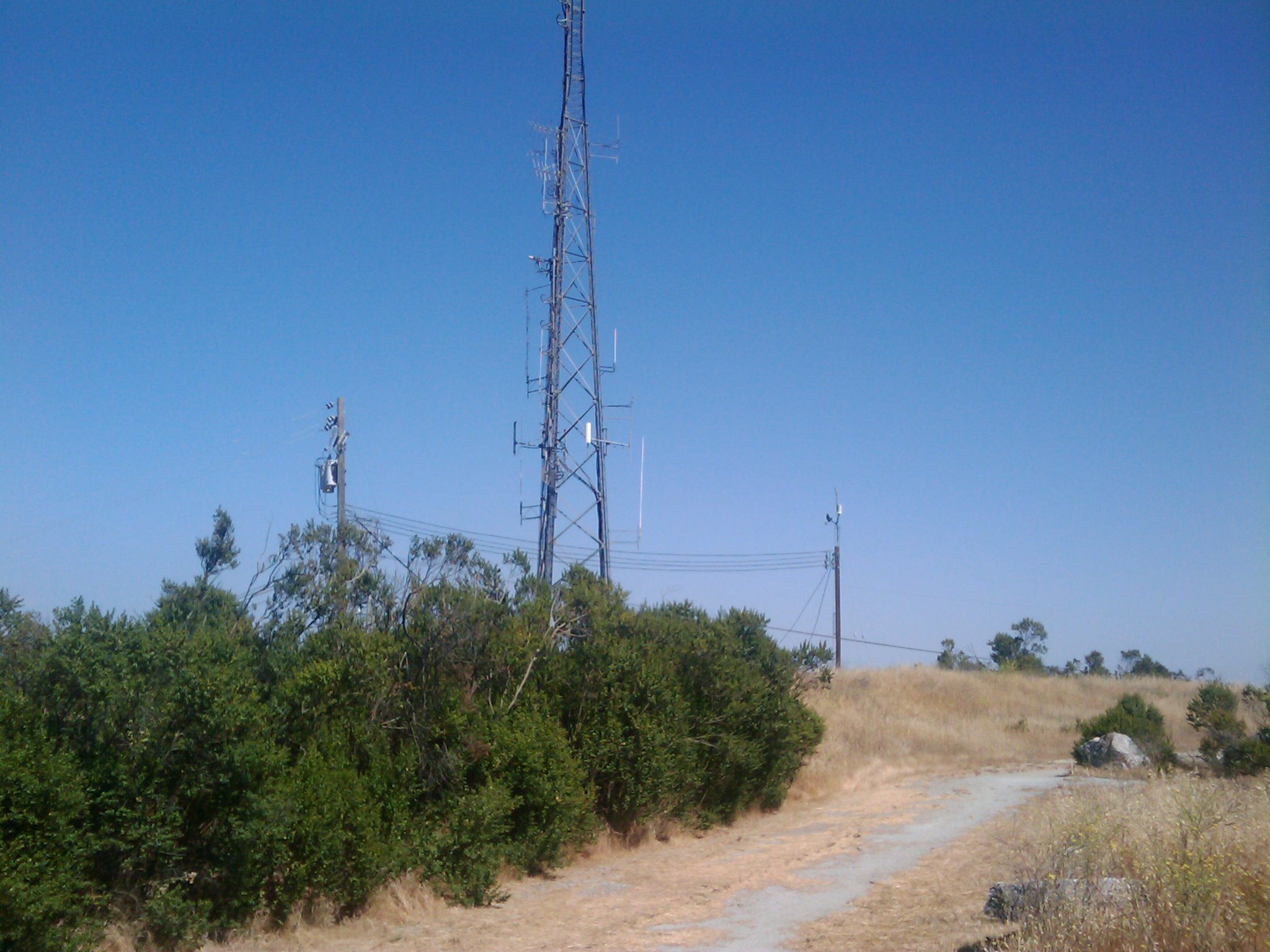
KSJO broadcast tower

As the new millennium arrived, KSJO's fortunes started to slide. Lamont and Tonelli were signed away by KSAN-FM in late 2002, and KXJO was sold to a separate entity that same year, flipping to a CHR format. KSJO's ratings started to slide as the demographics of the Bay Area changed. An increasingly large local Hispanic population and the rise of Hip Hop helped to chip away at the heritage rock station. Radio veteran Dave Wohlman was named PD in 2004 and began the task of re-inventing the rock legend with a new staff, sound and direction.

KSJO's owner, iHeartMedia (then Clear Channel Communications), had instituted an ambitious initiative to introduce more Spanish-language programming into various markets across the country. When the Walnut Creek simulcast station, KFJO, became KABL in 2004, many speculated that KSJO would soon drop rock for a Spanish-language format. The end came unannounced at 7 PM on October 28, 2004, when KSJO, after 35 years as a rock station, played its last song, "Mexican Radio" by Wall of Voodoo, and immediately launched a new Mexican oldies format as "La Preciosa". Longtime listeners were angered at the sudden loss of one of the Bay Area's last remaining active rock stations. (Santa Rosa-based KXFX, the Bay Area's only other commercial active rock station at the time, continued with the format until 2011, when it flipped to the Top 40 station KHTH. KVHS, a noncommercial radio station associated with Clayton Valley High School in Concord, California, continued to have an active rock format through 2021 when it flipped to a freeform format.)

On August 4, 2008, Clear Channel placed the station's assets into an entity called the Aloha Station Trust in order to sell off the station. This was due to Clear Channel being above the Federal Communications Commission (FCC) ownership limits. These limits were imposed when Clear Channel was officially taken private by Bain Capital Partners on July 30, 2008.

On September 18, 2009, KSJO picked up the "Channel 104.9" modern rock format from KCNL, branded as "Channel 92.3". The staff consisted of Joe Sib in the mornings, Jessie on middays, MegaTanner (formerly on KITS in San Francisco), and Teddy and Chris. "La Preciosa", meanwhile, was moved to 104.9.

Unlike many Alternative stations, Channel 92.3 focused on new music and Alternative classics from the '70s and the '80s, with not as much emphasis on the '90s.

On November 10, 2010, RadioInsight announced that Principle Broadcasting Network San Jose, LLC, which owns brokered ethnic stations in various cities, made an agreement with Clear Channel's Aloha Station Trust to buy KSJO. Principle also owns KLOK in San Jose. The sale was completed on February 28, 2011; at this time, the staff of KSJO was let go, and the station ran without airstaff, playing a broad-based alternative format dubbed "SALT: Save Alternative". It also included heavy promotions of savealternative.com.

On March 16, 2011, former Channel 92.3 hosts Teddy and Madden were invited back to give the station and its alternative rock format a proper send-off. At 10 AM, KSJO launched a new Chinese-language format branded as China 92.3. Save Alternative continued to stream online at savealternative.com and also added a simulcast on 104.9 HD-2. In addition, Save Alternative was broadcast on 104.9 KCNL every Saturday and Sunday night from 8 PM until midnight. (Save Alternative was discontinued on-air in May 2012, when KCNL was sold to the USC and flipped to KDFC's classical format but the format remains online and can be listened to at savealternative.com.)

KSJO began broadcasting dance music on its HD2 sub-channel in June 2011.

On May 1, 2012, the station rebranded as "U92.3 The Universal FM," also called "La Universal 92.3 FM." The station developed and aired a number of programs in Spanish, Chinese, Russian, Vietnamese and Persian.

In November 2013, KSJO-HD2 ended its dance music format and re-introduced the S*ALT (Save Alternative) alternative rock format. Later on, live programming from S*ALT was featured several times a week on KSJO.

On April 30, 2014, U92.3 broadcasters were given notifications to leave within 30 days as the station had been leased to an unnamed bidder. The bidder was revealed to be Cumulus Media, who planned to air country music under Cumulus' new Nash FM branding.

On May 25, 2014, at 9:03 PM, following the end of U92.3 programming, KSJO began stunting with the sound of a fictional train named "The Night Train 923" leaving from Nashville. It also featured a conductor taking the "tickets" of country stars and announcing that the time of arrival would come the next day at 9:23 AM, interspersed between Nash FM instrumental jingles and bits of music from the artists "admitted." The launch of "Nash FM" came at the time promised, with How Country Feels by Randy Houser being the first song played.

On March 1, 2016, Cumulus Media moved KSJO's Nash FM format to the HD2 subchannel of KSAN after Cumulus decided to end its deal with Universal. It was replaced with Bollywood music, billing itself as "Bolly 92.3," one of the first of its kind in the United States to feature music and artists from the Bollywood genre.

== Booster ==
KSJO is rebroadcast on the following FM Booster:

Call sign	Frequency	City of license	FID	ERP (W)	HAAT	Class	FCC info
KSJO-FM1	92.3 FM	Pleasanton, California	203495	67	303 m (994 ft)	D	LMS

== Sources ==
1. FM: it's now "fragmented radio"; Spokane Spokesman Review; Jan 15, 1984, accessed Jan 31, 2010
2. Rick Shannon Bio Page; accessed Jan 31, 2010
3. Jeff McNeal Broadcast Biography; accessed Jan 31, 2010
4. accessed Jan 31, 2010
5. accessed Jan 31, 2010
6. Perrin's professional history; accessed Jan 31, 2010
7. Mystery Solved: 2007 International Mystery Writers' Festival wraps with top award going to Kentucky author; accessed Jan 31, 2010
8. Suggestion that station staff was not told
9. 92.3 KSJO San Jose Sold; radioinsight.com; Nov 10, 2010
10. KUFX/KSJO San Jose Sales Close, Flip Pending at 92.3; radioinsight.com; Feb 28, 2011
