= KVHS =

Coordinates: 38.030°N 122.002°W

- Concord, California; United States
- Broadcast area: Diablo Valley
- Frequency: 90.5 MHz

Programming
- Format: Free-form radio

Ownership
- Owner: Contra Costa County Office of Education

History
- First air date: May 16, 1969
- Former frequencies: 91.1 MHz (1969–1972)
- Call sign meaning: Original licensee Clayton Valley High School with a K instead of a C

Technical information
- Licensing authority: FCC
- Facility ID: 11903
- Class: A
- ERP: 410 watts
- HAAT: 137 meters

Links
- Public license information: Public file; LMS
- Webcast: Listen Live
- Website: kvhs.com

KVHS (90.5 FM) is a radio station in Concord, California, United States, broadcasting a free-form radio format. It is owned by the Contra Costa County Office of Education and currently broadcasts from its facilities in Pleasant Hill.

KVHS was established in 1965 as a non-broadcast student-operated station on the campus of Clayton Valley High School, part of the Mt. Diablo Unified School District. It began FM broadcasting in May 1969. It became one of the largest high school stations in the United States with its transmitter at Bay Point, covering the Diablo Valley. After airing a mix of educational programming and rock music, the station became known as The Edge in the 1990s.

Clayton Valley was separated from the school district in 2012 and became a charter, but KVHS's broadcast license did not transfer to the charter school. As a result, students were no longer involved in its operation, and the station became volunteer-operated. In 2025, the station's long-running lease on the Bay Point tower ran out, and the school district was not interested in renewing it. The station was sold to the Contra Costa County Office of Education and is currently broadcasting from interim facilities at its offices.

== History ==
=== At Clayton Valley High School ===
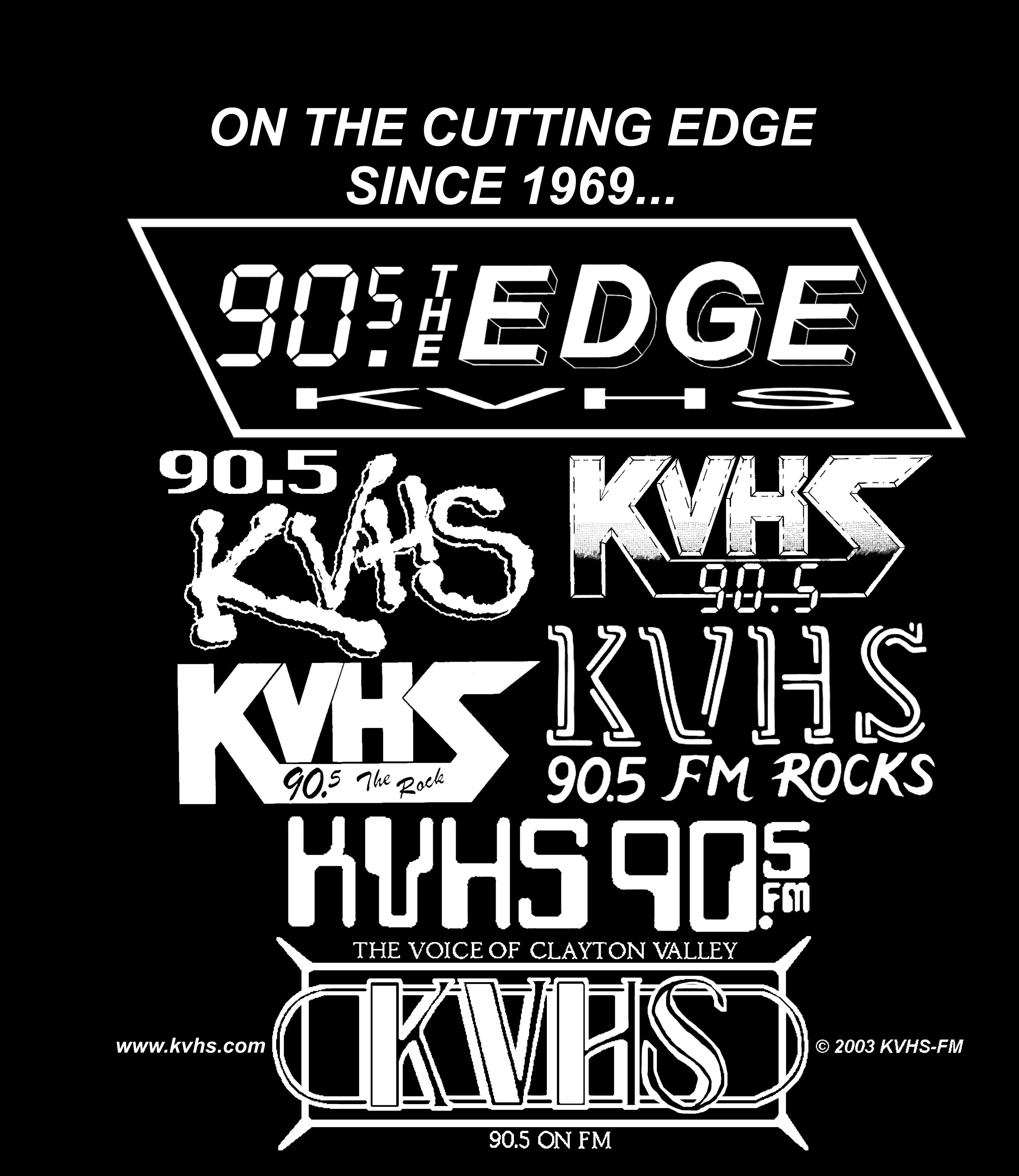
KVHS Bumper Sticker Collection through the years

KVHS was first organized in 1965 on the campus of Clayton Valley High School (CVHS). It aired music, which was played at lunchtime, and news, used in social studies classes, with its own Associated Press teletype machine. Students also prepared programming for weekly air on local radio station KKIS. The station was a carrier current operation on 660 kHz.

On July 26, 1968, CVHS applied to the Federal Communications Commission (FCC) to broadcast as a 10-watt FM radio station on 91.1 MHz. The FCC granted a construction permit for the station on November 12, 1968, and KVHS began FM broadcasting in May 1969. Within three months, its 35-foot (11 m) tower was damaged by vandals who cut guy wires supporting it; the station was rebuilt with an effective radiated power of 250 watts. In addition to rock music, students produced programs on the history of Contra Costa County and on youth issues. They also bought and built radios to receive the station and repaired and rebuilt donated equipment from other radio stations for use by KVHS. The station also refitted a former telephone repair truck for use as an outside broadcasting unit for remote broadcasts.

KVHS moved to 90.5 MHz on October 2, 1972, and upgraded power to 2.6 kW. It aired during the daytime with educational programming and rock and then offered the "Surprise Package", a Friday night program featuring old-time radio shows. In 1975, the station was donated a new antenna site to avoid interference between KVHS and school equipment. moving to Bay Point the next year. It also began broadcasts of Concord city council and Mt. Diablo Unified School District meetings.

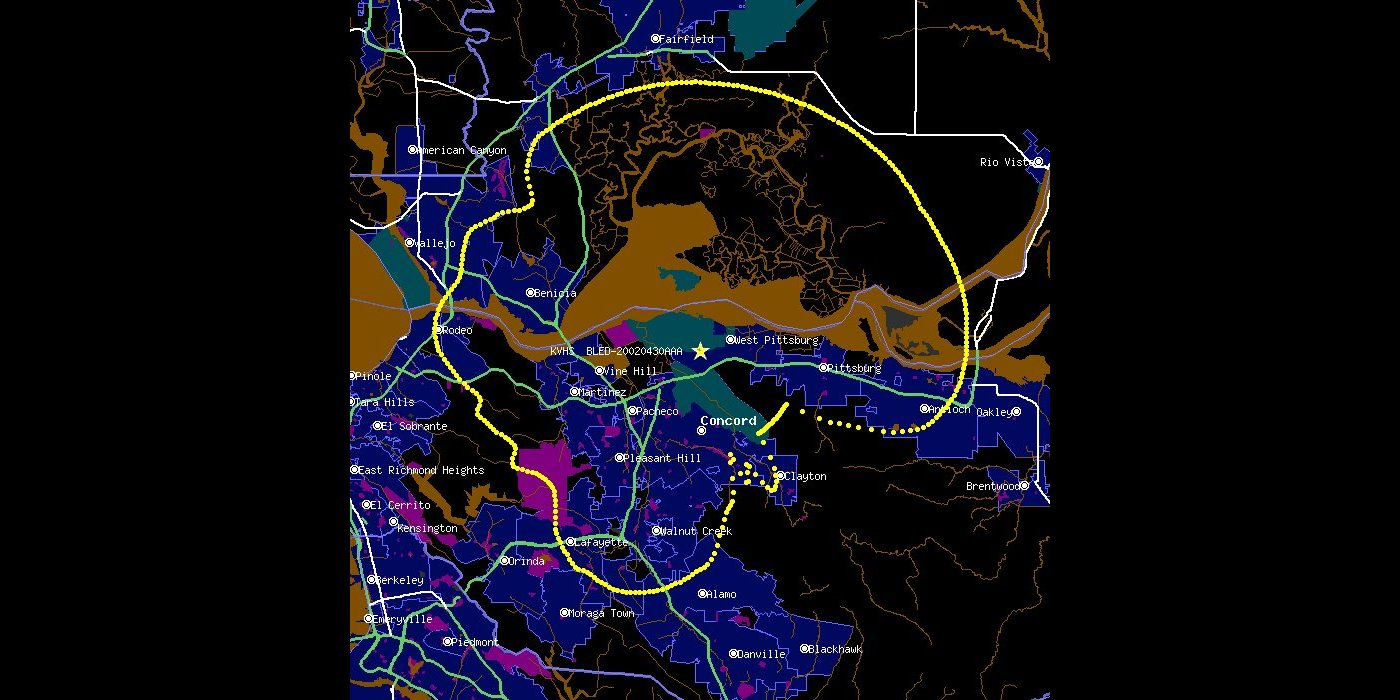
KVHS coverage map from the former Bay Point tower

By 1984, the station was on the air 15 hours a day during the school year and 12 hours during the summer, with students from the school and Contra Costa County's Regional Occupational Program. Alumni went on to work at local and regional radio stations. KVHS began 24-hour broadcasting in 1998, by which time it was known as The Edge. It was run by San Francisco radio veteran Melissa McConnell Wilson and aired an active rock format.

=== Change in status ===
In 2012, Clayton Valley became a charter school. The change in status produced uncertainty as to the fate of KVHS. The Mt. Diablo Unified School District considered moving the station to another one of its schools, but its board eventually agreed to keep the station on the air from Clayton Valley for a year unless the station were sold; KQED had made an offer to buy the facility, which would have served listeners who did not receive an adequate KQED signal in parts of Contra Costa County. At the time, few students were involved in the station, but its alumni protested any potential sale. For the next 13 years, the Mt. Diablo Unified School District continued to own KVHS, but students were not involved in any aspect of operations. Instead, KVHS was run entirely by volunteers—four of them by 2025. At one point in 2022, according to KVHS volunteer Dave Hughes, the school district put the station's broadcast license on the market but rejected a $520,000 offer from the Educational Media Foundation, owner of the national contemporary Christian music station K-Love. In 2024, all remaining equipment was moved out of Clayton Valley High School.

In 2025, the last of the renewal terms on the Mt. Diablo Unified School District's lease of tower space from American Tower ran out, and the district opted not to extend the lease because the facility no longer had an educational purpose. The school board put the KVHS license up for sale at a nominal price of $1 to any government agency; were no buyer to come forward, it would surrender the license. The station went off the air when the lease expired. The board voted in June to sell the station to the Contra Costa County Office of Education. The antenna was moved from the tower to the rooftop of the Office of Education building in Pleasant Hill on a temporary basis.

== Notable alumni ==
- Jeff Richards
