= Justin Mashore =

American baseball coach

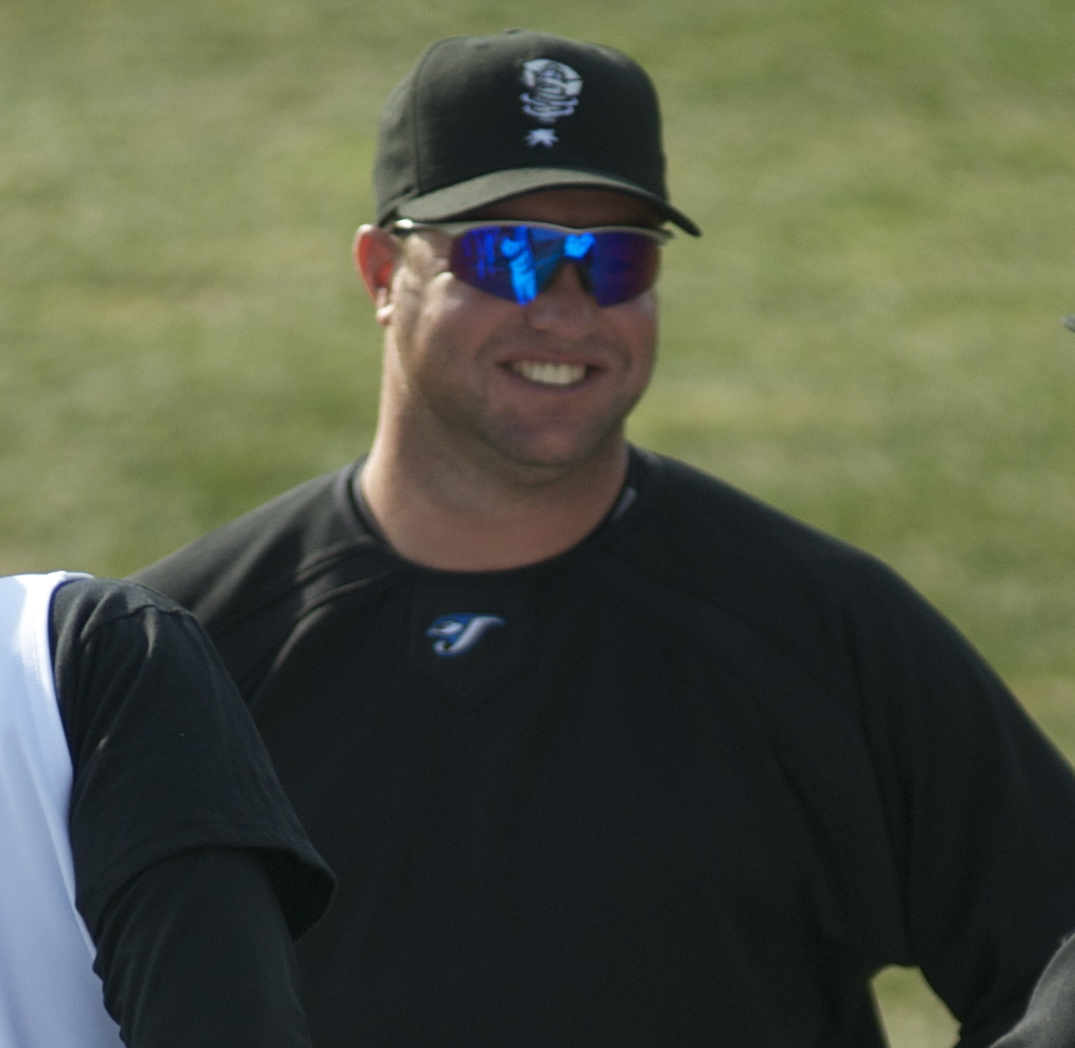
- Mashore with the Lansing Lugnuts in 2008

Uni-President Lions – No. 22
- Coach
- Born: February 14, 1972 (age 53); Concord, California, U.S.
- Bats: Right Throws: Right
- Stats at Baseball Reference

Teams
- Texas Rangers (2016–2018)

Justin Clyde Mashore (born February 14, 1972) is an American professional baseball coach and former player who currently serves as the hitting coach for the Uni-President 7-Eleven Lions of the Chinese Professional Baseball League (CPBL).

== Career ==
Mashore was drafted by the Detroit Tigers in the third round of the 1991 Major League Baseball draft out of Clayton Valley High School in Concord, California.

He played in Minor League Baseball until 2001 for numerous different organizations: the Tigers, San Diego Padres, Boston Red Sox, New York Mets and Colorado Rockies.

After his playing career he became a coach for numerous minor league teams.

Prior to the 2016 season, Mashore was hired by the Texas Rangers to be their assistant hitting coach, a position he retained through the 2018 season.

He was named as the hitting coach for the Triple–A New Orleans Baby Cakes of the Miami Marlins organization.

On December 24, 2022, the Uni-President Lions of the Chinese Professional Baseball League hired Mashore to serve as their hitting coach for the 2023 season.

== Personal life ==
His father, Clyde Mashore, and brother Damon Mashore both played in MLB.
