= Pioneer Amphitheatre =

Coordinates: 37°39′32.25″N 122°3′24.35″W

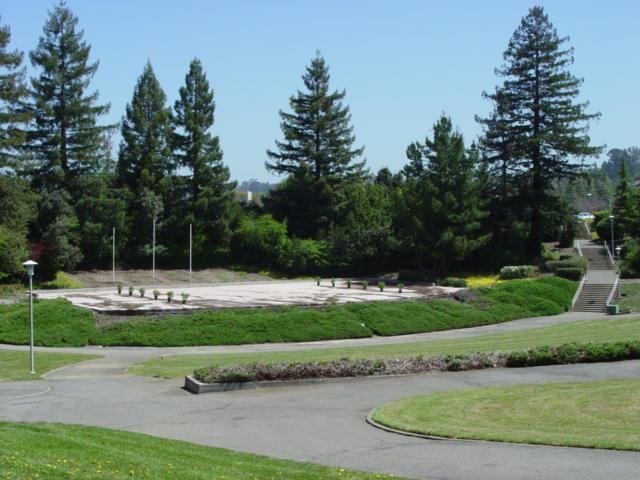
Pioneer Amphitheatre

The Pioneer Amphitheatre is an amphitheatre located at the north-eastern corner of the Hayward Hills Campus of California State University, East Bay in Hayward, California. The venue is managed by the Sequoia Management Group. In addition to outdoor concerts and university functions the Pioneer Amphitheatre is also plays host to numerous graduation ceremonies of local high schools and is an assembly area for the university in the event of a disaster or emergency.

== History ==
Prior to 2004, the Pioneer Amphitheatre was used primarily as a venue for outdoor concerts held by the music ensembles of the university, and was the home to Al Fresco, a welcome back festival held every October. In addition to music department events, the amphitheatre was also home an intermittent concert series held by the Associated Students board of the school.

In 2004, the management of the venue was handed over to the Sequoia Management Group in hopes of booking bigger acts to create a revenue stream for the university. Since 2004 the Amphitheatre has been the home of the KBLX Stone Soul Picnic, a day-long festival of Urban Adult Contemporary, soul and R&B music. The first picnic at the amphitheatre (which was the seventh annual picnic including other venues), in May 2004, featured The Isley Brothers, Teena Marie, Cameo and Rick James. Performers at subsequent picnics include Isaac Hayes.

== See also ==
- List of contemporary amphitheaters
- Pioneer Stadium
- Pioneer Gym
