= Clayton Valley Charter High School =

Location
- 1101 Alberta Way; Concord, California 94521; United States; 37°56′59″N 121°58′04″W

Information
- School type: Charter high school
- Motto: Nothing But The Best
- Established: CVHS 1958, CVCHS 2012
- Superintendent: Bill Morones
- CEEB code: 050658
- NCES School ID: 062637003940
- Principal: N/A
- Teaching staff: 96.61 (FTE)
- Grades: 9–12
- Enrollment: 2,390 (2023-2024)
- Student to teacher ratio: 24.74
- Language: English
- Colors: Red, white, blue, and black
- Mascot: Ugly Eagles
- Accreditation: WASC
- Website: www.claytonvalley.org

Clayton Valley Charter High School (CVCHS) is a comprehensive charter high school located in Concord, California, United States, just under two miles from Clayton. Most of the school's students live in Concord, Clayton and various parts of Contra Costa County.

As a charter school, CVCHS has both a traditional principal as site leader and an executive director who heads the school district central office as superintendent. It also has a nine-member governing board.

CVCHS houses ClaytonArts Academy. It is the location of the local radio station 90.5 "The Edge" KVHS, which broadcasts mostly hard rock and heavy metal music. Its newspaper is The Talon, which is part of the High School National Ad Network. The current executive director is Bill Morones.

== History ==
Clayton Valley High School was founded in 1958, as part of the Mount Diablo Unified School District. It served areas of Clayton and Concord as a regular public high school for more than 50 years.

Converting Clayton Valley High School into a charter school was first suggested in 2010. A petition was submitted to MDUSD on June 9, 2011, and the proposal was debated for several months in 2011. Part of the controversy was that CVHS students who did not wish to attend CVCHS would be sent to other MDUSD high schools. The MDUSD Board of Trustees initially approved the proposal, then reversed its decision on November 8, 2011. Supporters of the charter movement filed an appeal with the Contra Costa County Board of Education, which on January 11, 2012, overturned the district's decision and approved the charter. As part of the transition, Clayton Valley High School officially closed on June 30, 2012. Clayton Valley Charter High School's first school year was 2012–2013; that year the school showed marked improvement on the Academic Performance Index and the football team won the divisional title for the first time.

== Controversy ==
In September 2018, a county investigation found that the two top leaders of the school, Dave Linzey, the school's executive director, and his wife, Eileen Linzey, the school's chief program officer, had "raked in almost $850,000 in less than two years before leaving the school". The couple had also misused funds, created job positions, and hired people in secret. As of March 2019, an extensive audit spanning July 2012 to June 2018 was still underway.

In March 2019, a Contra Costa County Superior Court ordered Clayton Valley to pay back $857,000 to Mount Diablo Unified School District for the use of their facilities from the 2013–2017 school years. "Clayton Valley High claimed it spent hundreds of thousands of dollars to upgrade amenities for its female athletes [for Title IX] and asked Mt. Diablo to cover the construction costs."

In October 2021, The Court of Appeal reversed the trial court's judgment resolving a dispute with the school district concerning the "facilities costs" for which the district may properly charge the charter school.

The court concluded that a district must exclude from the facilities costs it charges a charter school all costs of both operations and ongoing maintenance if the charter school pays those costs for its own premises. The court explained that, while the text of the regulations is ambiguous and, in part, self-contradictory, the regulatory history and the statutory scheme, as well as the common understanding of all parties prior to the trial court's unsolicited ruling, make clear that the state board did not intend such a result. In this case, Cal. Code Regs., tit. 5, section 11969.7 requires a district to exclude plant maintenance and operations costs from its facilities costs in calculating the pro rata share of a charter school that pays for its own operations and maintenance. Furthermore, section 11969.7 requires a district to exclude from facilities costs any contributions to its ongoing and major maintenance (OMM) account that are ultimately disbursed to pay costs of a type paid by the charter school. Accordingly, the court remanded for further proceedings.

== Athletics ==
Clayton Valley's teams are the Eagles, known as the Ugly Eagles.

== Notable alumni ==
- Blake Anderson, actor, producer, and screenwriter; co-star and co-creator of the show Workaholics
- Michael Busbee, (June 18, 1976 – September 29, 2019), known professionally as “busbee”, was an American songwriter, record producer, publisher, record label executive, and multi-instrumentalist. He graduated from Clayton Valley High School in 1994.
- Rob Cavestany and Mark Osegueda, cousins and Grammy-nominated musicians from the band Death Angel.
- Erin Dobratz, synchronized swimmer, Olympic medallist
- Kara Kohler, rower, Olympic medallist
- Clyde Mashore (1945–2016), professional baseball player
- Damon Mashore, former professional baseball player
- Justin Mashore, Major League Baseball coach
- Chris Mazza, Major League Baseball pitcher
- Kahlil McKenzie, NFL player for the Cincinnati Bengals
- Brandon Mull, author of fantasy series Fablehaven
- Kyle Newacheck, television writer, director, producer and actor; co-star, co-creator, director of the show Workaholics
- Martin Nievera, Filipino-American singer and television host
- Chris Reifert, former Death drummer, and founder/drummer/singer of pioneering gore death metal band Autopsy.
- Scott Sanderson, former professional football player
- Bob Thomason, former college basketball coach
- Sam Williams, former professional football player
- Jordan Woolery, professional softball player with the Utah Talons in the AUSL.
- Brian Doolittle, professional actor who participated in the Broadway tour of the Music Man in the 2026-2027 season
