= Sam Williams (linebacker) =

American football player (born 1980)

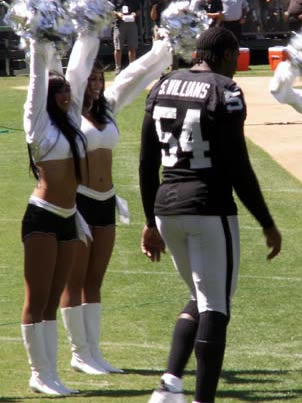
- Williams with the Oakland Raiders

No. 54
- Position: Linebacker

Personal information
- Born: July 28, 1980 (age 46); Concord, California, U.S.
- Listed height: 6 ft 5 in (1.96 m)
- Listed weight: 260 lb (118 kg)

Career information
- High school: Clayton Valley (Concord)
- College: Fresno State
- NFL draft: 2003: 3rd round, 83rd overall pick

Career history
- Oakland Raiders (2003–2010)

Career NFL statistics
- Total tackles: 129
- Sacks: 1
- Forced fumbles: 1
- Fumble recoveries: 2
- Interceptions: 1
- Defensive touchdowns: 1
- Stats at Pro Football Reference

Samuel Jerry Williams (born July 28, 1980) is an American former professional football player who was a linebacker for the Oakland Raiders of the National Football League (NFL). He was selected by the Raiders in the third round of the 2003 NFL draft. He played college football for the Fresno State Bulldogs.

== Early life ==
Williams attended Clayton Valley High School in Concord, California. He accumulated 138 tackles (79 of which were solo), five interceptions (two of which were returned for touchdowns), 10 pass breakups, and two blocked extra points his senior year, earning second-team all-state honors.

== College career ==
Williams played college football for the Fresno State Bulldogs from 1998 to 2002. He was redshirted in 2002.

== Professional career ==
Williams was selected by the Oakland Raiders in the third round, with the 83rd overall pick, of the 2003 NFL draft. He officially signed with the team on July 25, 2003. He played in one game in 2003 but recorded no statistics. Williams was placed on injured reserve on November 19, 2003.

He played in nine games, starting four, for the Raiders in 2004, totaling 22 solo tackles, five assisted tackle and three pass breakups. He was placed on injured reserve for the second time on August 29, 2005. Williams appeared in 15 games, starting 12, during the 2006 season, recording 38 solo tackles, six assisted tackles, one sack, one pass breakup, and one fumble recovery that was returned 30 yards for a touchdown. He played in 11 games, starting four, in 2007, accumulating 11 solo tackles, five assisted tackles, one forced fumble and one pass breakup. He appeared in 16 games, starting two, for the Raiders during the 2008 season, totaling nine solo tackles, three assisted tackles, one fumble recovery, one interception and one pass breakup.

Williams became a free agent after the 2008 season, and re-signed with the Raiders on April 1, 2009. He played in 16 games, starting two, in 2009, recording 16 solo tackles and three assisted tackles. He also returned two kicks for 11 yards, one punt for no yards, and fumbled once that season. Williams re-signed with the Raiders on April 12, 2010. He appeared in 16 games, no starts, in 2010, totaling eight solo tackles and three assisted tackles.

Williams was waived by the Raiders in the final round of roster cuts on September 3, 2011. Overall, he played in 84 games, starting 24, during his NFL career, recording 104 solo tackles, 25 assisted tackles, one sack, one forced fumble, two fumble recoveries, one interception, six pass breakups and one touchdown.
