= KOIT =

Radio station in San Francisco, California

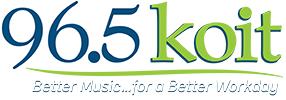
- San Francisco, California; United States
- Broadcast area: San Francisco Bay Area
- Frequency: 96.5 MHz (HD Radio)
- Branding: 96.5 KOIT

Programming
- Language: English
- Format: Adult contemporary
- Subchannels: HD2: AAA "Highway 1"; HD3: KBAY simulcast

Ownership
- Owner: Connoisseur Media
- Sister stations: KBLX-FM; KMVQ-FM; KUFX; KBAY; KEZR

History
- First air date: July 1, 1947
- Former call signs: KRON-FM (1947–1975); KOIT (1975–1983); KOIT-FM (1983–2010)
- Call sign meaning: The Coit Tower, a San Francisco landmark

Technical information
- Licensing authority: FCC
- Facility ID: 6380
- Class: B
- ERP: 24,000 watts
- HAAT: 480 meters (1,570 ft)
- Transmitter coordinates: 37.7552°N 122.4527°W
- Repeater: See § Booster

Links
- Public license information: Public file; LMS
- Webcast: Listen live Listen live (via Audacy); Listen live (HD2); Listen live (via Audacy) (HD2)
- Website: www.koit.com highway1radio.com (HD2)

KOIT (96.5 FM) is a commercial adult contemporary radio station licensed in San Francisco, California. The station has studios along Junipero Serra Boulevard in Daly City, and transmits from Sutro Tower in San Francisco, with a power output of 24,000 watts effective radiated power. The signal can be received throughout the Bay Area with relative ease. There is also a booster station in Martinez, California called KOIT-FM3 that improves the coverage in the Diablo Valley area.

KOIT is owned by Connoisseur Media following a May 2026 purchase from Bonneville International.

KOIT broadcasts in HD.

== History ==
The station signed on the air July 1, 1947, under the callsign KRON-FM. It was owned by the deYoung family, and was co-owned with KRON-TV and the San Francisco Chronicle newspaper. The station had a limited broadcast schedule (airing only during the evening hours). The station shut down on December 31, 1954; when it returned to the air as non-commercial station in 1957, KRON-FM began carrying an evening-only program schedule devoted to classical music. During the 1960s, KRON-FM devoted a full hour (7:00 to 8:00 p.m.) to a complete Broadway show album. Since the station had no commercials, no underwriters, and no on-air fund drives, the Chronicle operated the station as a public service. Staff announcers delivered short newscasts on the station's evening broadcasts. In December 1970, KRON-FM began simulcasting a Spanish-language newscast from KRON-TV by Terry Lowry.

In 1975, the deYoung's Chronicle Publishing Company, which was the then-parent of KRON-TV and the Chronicle, sold KRON-FM to Bonneville International, who changed the station's callsign to KOIT. On December 13, 1983, Bonneville purchased KYA (1260 AM) from KING Broadcasting, changing the call letters to KOIT with 96.5 going to KOIT-FM per FCC convention. The KYA call letters remained in service at KYA-FM (93.3, now KRZZ) which coincidentally had been the original home of the KOIT call letters, utilizing them from 1965 to 1972. During that time, as most beautiful stations shifted to playlists consisting of mostly vocals, KOIT was playing a lot of instrumental music, muchthe "elevator music" that was being played at KBAY (then at 100.3 FM) in San Jose. The majority of the station's playlist consisted of instrumentals, but also contained some vocals.

On June 3, 1985, KOIT changed their music format to soft adult contemporary by dropping all instrumentals, and started playing music from the 1950s, 1960's, 1970s and 1980s. KOIT called their music "Light Rock". For the first 8 years of the adult contemporary format, the station was heavy on oldies. In 1995, KOIT updated their playlist by dropping the 1950s and 1960s songs, and added more recent and current music. As recently as 2009, KOIT was playing approximately one song from every decade in order in 3 song-sets. In 2009, KOIT started playing more recent hits from the late 2000s and early 2010s. Since 2003, KOIT has switched to Christmas Music every year, generally the Friday before Thanksgiving at 12:00 PM, and brands itself as "The Bay Area's Official Christmas Music Station."

On January 18, 2007, Bonneville announced a station swap with Entercom, with KOIT and Bonneville's other San Francisco area FM radio holdings going to Entercom in return for three of Entercom's stations in Seattle, Washington and Entercom's entire radio cluster in Cincinnati, Ohio. This trade marked Entercom's re-entry into the country's fourth largest radio market. Entercom officially took over KOIT-FM via a local marketing agreement on February 26, 2007, and Entercom and Bonneville officially closed on the deal on March 14, 2008, with KOIT and the other San Francisco FM stations formerly owned by Bonneville becoming owned by Entercom outright. KOIT's AM sister station was concurrently sold to Immaculate Heart Radio, and became KSFB in December 2007; however, KOIT-FM did not drop the "-FM" suffix until September 2010.

On February 2, 2017, CBS Radio announced that it would merge with Entercom. To comply with FCC ownership limits, it was announced that KOIT, along with sister stations KBLX and KUFX, CBS-owned KMVQ, and a cluster in Sacramento, would be divested. Under a local marketing agreement with the Entercom Divestiture Trust, Bonneville once again assumed operations of the station following the completion of the merger on November 17. On August 3, 2018, Bonneville announced that it would acquire all of the divested Entercom stations it had been operating for $141 million; the sale was completed on September 21, 2018.

In 2020, Bonneville's San Francisco stations moved their studios from the SoMa district in San Francisco into a newly built studio along Junipero Serra Boulevard in Daly City.

On October 7, 2025, Connoisseur Media announced its intent to acquire Bonneville's San Francisco/San Jose cluster for $10 million. The sale closed on May 15, 2026.

== Booster ==
KOIT is rebroadcast on the following FM booster:

Call sign	Frequency	City of license	FID	ERP (W)	HAAT	Class	FCC info
KOIT-FM3	96.5 FM	Martinez, California	6374	3,300 (Vert.)	305 m (1,001 ft)	D	LMS

== HD Radio ==
On December 28, 2018, KOIT's HD2 subchannel changed their format from 1970s' hits (which moved to KUFX's HD2 subchannel) to adult album alternative, branded as "96.5 HD2". In early September 2020, the format was changed to rock, branded as "Highway 1".

On May 10, 2024, KOIT's HD3 sub channel switched from year-round Christmas music to bilingual; soft adult contemporary, branded as "Bay Area Magic".
