= KEXC =

Public radio station in Alameda, California

Simulcast of KEXP-FM, Seattle
- Alameda, California; United States
- Broadcast area: San Francisco Bay Area
- Frequency: 92.7 MHz (HD Radio)
- Branding: KEXP Bay Area

Programming
- Format: Eclectic, indie music
- Affiliations: NPR (music licensing)

Ownership
- Owner: Friends of KEXP

History
- First air date: August 1, 1959
- Former call signs: KJAZ (1959–1994); KJAZ-FM (1994–1995); KZSF (1995–1998); KZSF-FM (1998–1999); KXJO (1999–2002); KPTI (2002–2004); KBTB (May–October 2004); KNGY (2004–2009); KREV (2009–2024)
- Call sign meaning: Derived from KEXP

Technical information
- Licensing authority: FCC
- Facility ID: 36029
- Class: A
- ERP: 6,000 watts
- HAAT: 289 meters (948 ft)
- Transmitter coordinates: 37°45′19.0″N 122°27′10.0″W

Links
- Public license information: Public file; LMS
- Webcast: Listen live
- Website: kexp.org/bayarea

KEXC (92.7 FM) is a non-commercial radio station serving the San Francisco Bay Area, licensed to Alameda, California, United States. It is owned by the non-profit entity Friends of KEXP, an affiliate of the University of Washington, and broadcasts an AAA format specializing in indie music programmed by its disc jockeys as "KEXP Bay Area", a near-total simulcast of Seattle's KEXP-FM. The station's transmitter is located on Sutro Tower.

The station began broadcasting as KJAZ on August 1, 1959. It was founded by Pat Henry as an all-jazz station and broadcast from studios first in Berkeley and later in Alameda. The small, independent outlet was the only all-jazz station in the Bay Area. A challenge to its broadcast license, begun in 1974, led to a designation for hearing in 1978. To avoid the hearing, Henry attempted a distress sale to the San Francisco–based Mabuhay Corporation; the deal fell through, and it was later revealed that Mabuhay was a front for pro-Ferdinand Marcos interests in the United States. In 1981, the station was sold to Oakland mayor Lionel Wilson and Alameda real estate developer Ron Cowan, who became sole owner in 1983. The station briefly prospered and became profitable in the late 1980s, but as non-commercial competition in the form of KCSM grew in popularity and the economy worsened, Cowan became unable to continue investing in the station.

Despite an effort by listeners that raised more than $1 million in pursuit of keeping KJAZ a jazz station, Cowan sold it to Z-Spanish Radio Network. After 35 years of jazz, the station switched to Z-Spanish's satellite-programmed "La Z" Spanish-language hit radio format and was renamed to KZSF on August 1, 1994. This continued for four years until Z-Spanish sold the station to Jacor (soon purchased itself by Clear Channel Communications), which renamed the station KXJO and used both it and KFJO in Walnut Creek to simulcast San Jose rock station KSJO as the "92-Rock Network". Radio industry consolidation led to two sales of the station in 2000 and the purchase of KXJO by Spanish Broadcasting System (SBS). In 2002 SBS relaunched the station as dance music–focused KPTI "92.7 The Party", its only English-language radio station in the continental U.S. The station was quickly divested in 2004 to Three Point Media, which used a briefly popular and controversial hip-hop format known as KBTB "Power 92.7" to boost ratings and revenue before selling the station to Flying Bear Media. Under Flying Bear, the station became KNGY "Energy 92.7", a dance music station catering to the Bay Area's gay community.

After Flying Bear Media was faced with financial difficulties, its lender, Wells Fargo, sold the station to Ed Stolz in 2009. The Energy format was discontinued and replaced by mainstream contemporary hits as KREV, branded "92.7 Rev FM". A copyright royalty lawsuit that Stolz lost in 2018 spiraled into court-appointed receivership in 2020; for nine months, the receiver contracted with Christian broadcaster VCY America to provide programming for KREV and other Stolz-owned stations and arranged a sale to VCY America. This was scrapped in early 2022 after a bankruptcy court ordered possession and control of the station returned to Stolz; the station was off the air for much of 2022 before returning with dance and, later, hip-hop music. Ultimately, Stolz was unable to formulate a reorganization plan, and a bankruptcy auction of his stations was set. Friends of KEXP, the owner of Seattle station KEXP-FM, won the auction for KREV and launched a near-complete simulcast of its programming in the Bay Area as KEXC on March 19, 2024.

== KJAZ: Jazz music ==
=== Pat Henry ownership ===
The Federal Communications Commission (FCC) granted a construction permit to Patrick Henry and Dave Larsen on December 10, 1958, for a new radio station to be built on 92.7 MHz in Alameda. Henry was a jazz DJ on Oakland radio station KROW and a recognized leader in the Bay Area jazz community. Larsen, a Minnesota native, was the program manager of KNOB, a jazz radio station in Los Angeles.

Broadcasting from studios and a transmitter site on Telegraph Avenue in Berkeley as well as secondary studios in Alameda's South Shore Shopping Center, KJAZ debuted on August 1, 1959. (Note: Station promotions note August 1, but newspaper reports from that period vary, including reports stating August 2 and 3.) The first song played was a Miles Davis recording of an arrangement by Gil Evans. (Note: A 1984 article in the San Francisco Examiner says the first song KJAZ played came from Davis's Sketches of Spain album. This cannot be the case, as it was released in July 1960.) The station initially broadcast for 15 hours a day, from 9 a.m. to midnight. Announcers heard on the station at launch included S. I. Hayakawa, a semanticist and jazz fan. Larsen sold his interest in KJAZ to Henry in 1960 and joined the staff of San Francisco station KBAY-FM, helping to found a second San Francisco-area jazz outlet, the short-lived KHIP-FM, later that year. The station focused on newer jazz recordings, in part because Henry felt the quality of older recordings was ill-suited for the "high-fidelity" FM band.

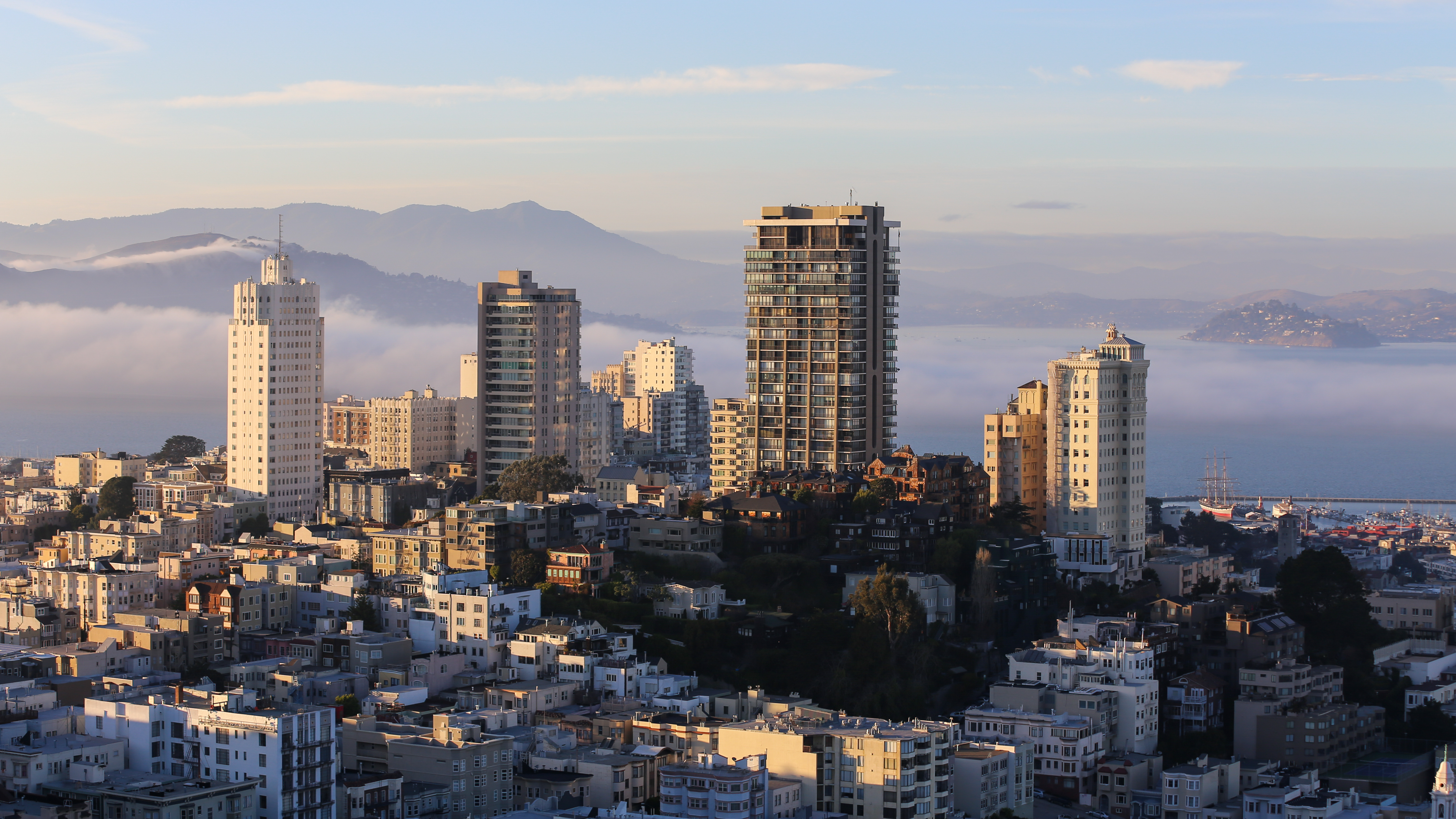
Russian Hill in San Francisco. Note the FM antenna on the tower at left.

In November 1962, KJAZ moved its transmitter to the Russian Hill neighborhood of San Francisco, its antenna on top of the tallest apartment building on the hill (21 or 28 stories high). The new facility increased the station's coverage in most areas, though it was lost in some fringe areas such as Monterey. The station was turning a profit by 1965, when it relocated its studios to 1509 1/2 Webster Street in Alameda and began stereo broadcasting. In the Alameda studios, the station would sometimes have to reduce its volume in order to not disturb patients of a nearby dentist's office. By 1972, other stations offered specialty jazz programming, but KJAZ was the Bay Area's only full-time jazz outlet. With its own telephone lines connecting its Alameda studios to San Francisco, it aired live such events as the last performance of the Modern Jazz Quartet and concerts featuring such names as Stanley Turrentine, Morgana King, Horace Silver, and Milt Jackson. As the years progressed, Henry became more vocal about expressing his music taste through the station. He was known to call from his home when the station played a song he felt did not belong.

=== License challenge ===
In 1974, the Committee for Open Media (COM)—a group created by a philosophy professor at San Jose State University—filed petitions against the broadcast license renewals of KJAZ and seven other California broadcast stations. While COM believed that KJAZ was not adequately serving community needs, some jazz fans believed that the station's devotion to a music form otherwise scarcely heard on the Bay Area dial countered its lack of public affairs content. In the Berkeley Daily Gazette, for instance, Gordon Laddue highlighted the station's unique programming and noted its full-day tribute to Duke Ellington upon his death earlier that year. At the same time that the COM petition was pending, Henry was trying to counter an increasing reputation by the station for playing "conservative" jazz; he noted that most of the recordings KJAZ aired were from 1968 or later and ascribed the reputation to its extensive specialty programming.

The FCC awarded KJAZ a renewal of its license in 1976, but COM petitioned for FCC reconsideration and a reversal in federal appeals court. The FCC then asked for the case to be remanded to it in order to resolve factual conflicts that it believed required a hearing. COM, seeking to foreclose on that possibility, proposed the transfer of KJAZ to a non-profit corporation that would be Black-controlled; this became a moot point when the proceeding was remanded by the court, setting in motion the designation of a hearing. Believing that Henry wanted to sell after the matter was settled, a group known as the San Francisco Bay Area Jazz Foundation formed; notable members included Clint Eastwood and Orrin Keepnews. In early 1978, the FCC held off acting on a staff recommendation that the license be designated for hearing after receiving reports that COM had offered $1 million to buy the station, which would have been seen as an abuse of commission processes; when it vacated its earlier renewal in October 1978, this was designated as an issue in the hearing process. The KJAZ hearing was particularly unusual because of the station's reputation and the fact that, by 1978, Henry was seen to have improved the station and particularly its public affairs programming in response to criticism; George Ross of the Oakland Tribune accused the stakeholders of "loving KJAZ and all that jazz ... loving it perhaps to death".

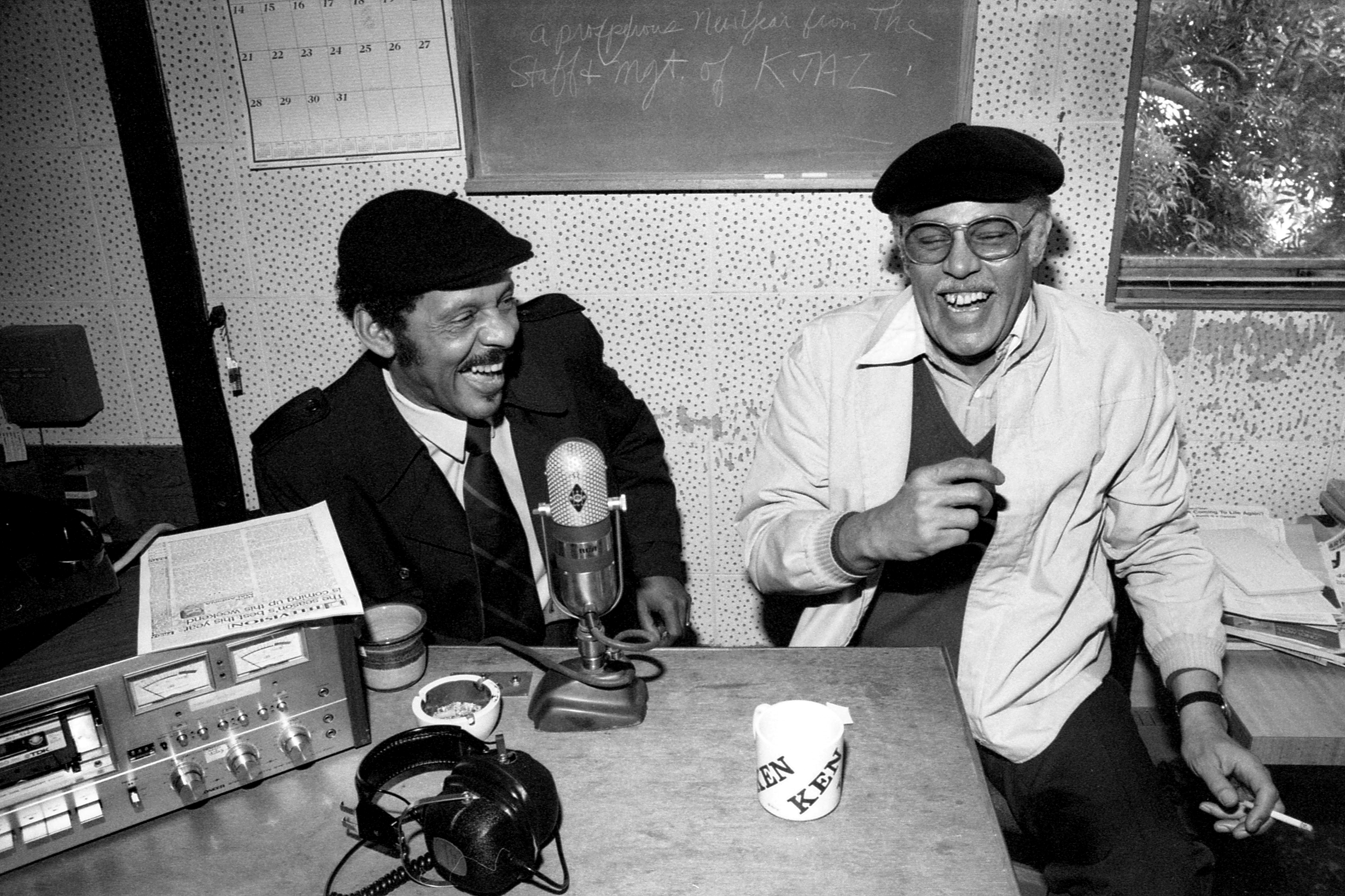
Jazz musicians Ernie Andrews (left) and Dexter Gordon in the KJAZ studio in 1980

In early 1979, Henry reached a deal to sell KJAZ in a distress sale to the Mabuhay Corporation for $1.675 million—substantially below market value, as required under the distress sale provisions, which provided for transactions to minority-controlled groups to end hearing matters before the FCC. Mabuhay's controlling owner was San Francisco doctor Leonilo Malabed, a Filipino American who also had bank and newspaper interests; the transaction would have made KJAZ the first Filipino American–owned station in the continental U.S. Mabuhay pledged to keep the jazz format. While the Mabuhay deal was pending, workers who had previously attempted to unionize KJAZ went on strike in August after Henry fired two employees, with the workers citing "poverty-level wages and stone-age benefits". Henry and family members began operating the station in lieu of the striking workers. COM also opposed the Mabuhay transfer at below market value, with Malabed claiming he was not the "right minority" in its eyes.

Largely unheralded at the time, Mabuhay and Malabed had extensive ties to Ferdinand Marcos, a dictator who ruled the Philippines. COM objected to the sale, relying on reporting by Alex Esclamado, an opponent of Marcos and the publisher of the anti-Marcos newspaper The Philippine News. Reporting by Esclamado indicated that Mabuhay was a front group for pro-Marcos interests. He cited Mabuhay's connections to the Philippine Bank of California, which had been funded by the Marcos government, as well as Malabed's use of consulate license plates and publication of a pro-Marcos newspaper. The deal fell apart in October 1979, according to Malabed, because it had been advised that the sellers possibly lacked clear title to the business; Henry's attorney, Roger Metzler, noted that the deal had hit a deadline without a final FCC ruling. When Marcos was deposed in February 1986, he fled to the United States, where officials seized documents that implicated the use of Mabuhay as a funnel for donations to pro-Marcos politicians in the U.S. Mabuhay also provided funding for attempts coordinated by the Philippine government to crush dissident, including the 1981 murders of Seattle cannery workers Silme Domingo and Gene Viernes, who were leading an anti-Marcos effort with their union.

=== Ron Cowan ownership ===
In December 1979, Ron Cowan, a real estate developer with projects in Alameda and elsewhere, and Lionel Wilson, the mayor of Oakland, formed KJAZ Inc. to buy the station from Henry. Wilson, who was Black, owned 50 percent of the firm to satisfy the distress sale requirement of a minority-controlled buyer. His ownership of exactly 50 percent caused a delay to the sale after the commission ruled that a majority minority ownership was 50.1 percent or greater, leading the FCC's broadcast bureau to oppose the transaction. During this time, Henry and COM reached a settlement of the original 1974 license challenge, but Pat Henry noted that the stress associated with the station's recently turbulent history left him committed to sell.

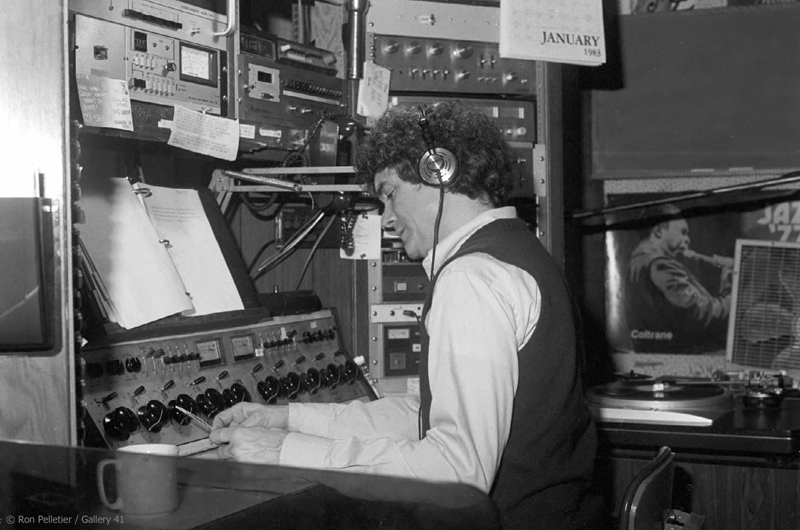
Jazz musician Bud Spangler in the KJAZ studio in Alameda in 1983

Cowan professionalized the formerly mom-and-pop operation, cited by Billboard magazine as "one of the most respected radio stations in the country", with full-time sales representatives to replace the heavy use of barter agreements with advertisers under Henry, as well as new back-office procedures and employee benefits. The music mix was changed to reflect less of Henry's personal taste and give the disc jockeys more freedom on the air. However, the station required more financial subsidy than its buyers had previously estimated. A heavy slate of outside promotion, which Henry had shunned, included broadcast advertising and the sponsorship of a San Francisco International KJAZ Festival in 1981.

After 18 months, Cowan sought to sell the station to focus on Harbor Bay Isle, a major master-planned development of his on Bay Farm Island in Alameda, disappointing Wilson; KJAZ never changed hands, and Cowan instead bought Wilson's share in the station. In late 1983, with the station continuing to lose money, Cowan made more major changes, including making the music mix more contemporary and dismissing 22-year station veteran Dick Conte; many believed Conte was dismissed for leading another attempt at unionizing KJAZ. The new format was designed to be more consistent throughout the day; it increased listenership and advertising revenue and cultivated a select, high-income audience.

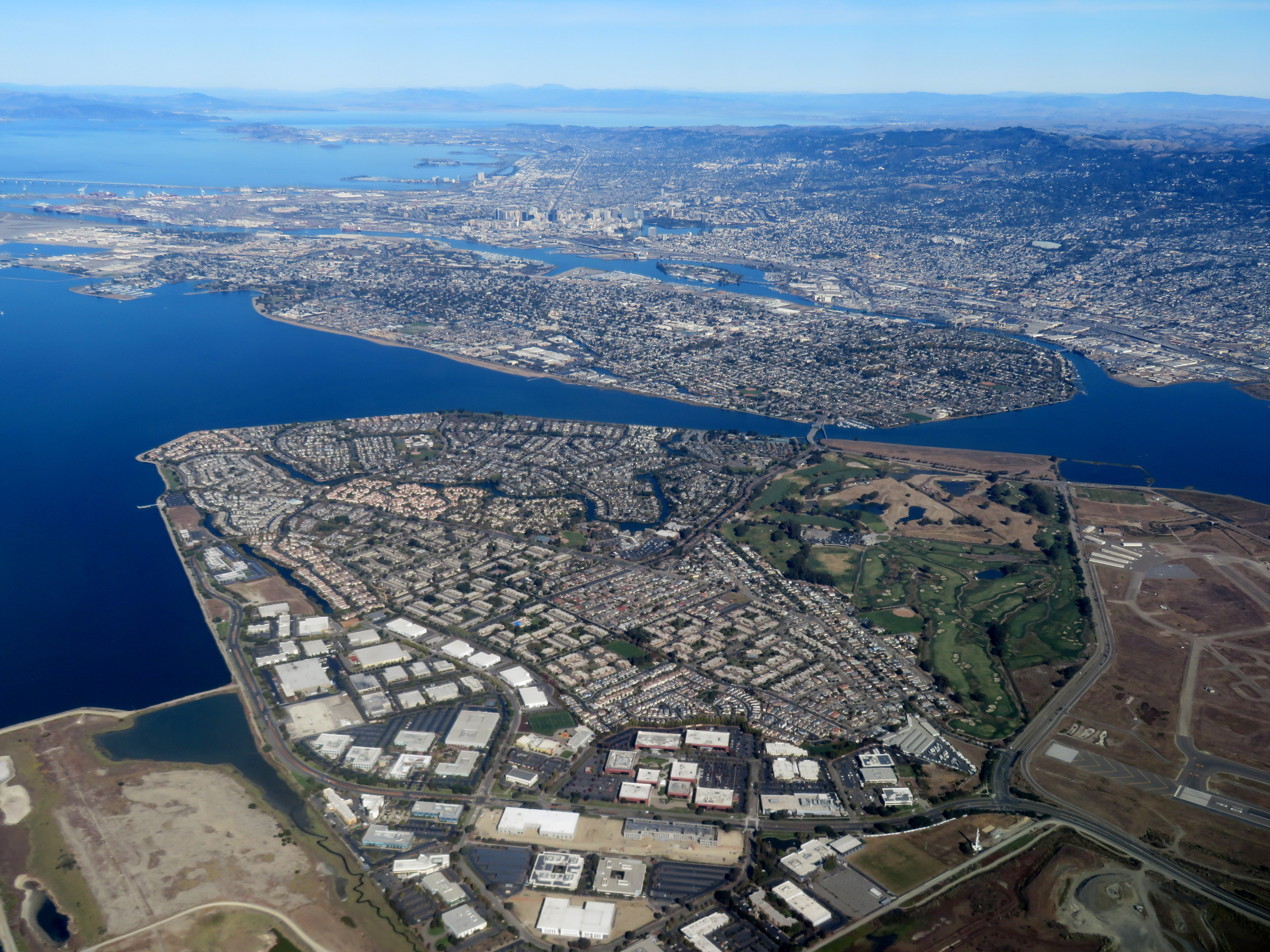
An aerial view of Bay Farm Island; KJAZ's studios were in one of the buildings at the bottom of the image.

In 1987, KJAZ moved from its longtime studios in Alameda to a facility in Cowan's Harbor Bay Isle development. The facility featured panoramic views of the area as well as a grand piano for live performances. In May 1988, the station debuted Jazz Over the Pacific, a nightly hour-long show originating from KJAZ and broadcast via satellite to Japan's FM Tokyo; it was the first regularly scheduled live radio show broadcast from the U.S. to Japan. Cowan had been cultivating KJAZ contacts in the country since 1980, when he was part of a California trade delegation there.

Despite the station's prosperity in the late 1980s, KJAZ's financial performance worsened in the early 1990s. In part, this was because of the increasing presence of jazz on other local stations, particularly KCSM, a noncommercial station owned by the College of San Mateo, which began broadcasting jazz around the clock six days a week and had a stronger signal; Pat Henry was one of its disc jockeys. At one point, KJAZ's general manager suggested the college change music formats to avoid damaging his station.

In 1992, Cowan denied rumors that the station was bankrupt, though he admitted that revenues were down, in line with the broadcast industry. The next year, Cowan took out a bank loan to finance a project to turn KJAZ into a satellite-distributed, national service, much as WFMT in Chicago had done with classical music. He called reports of financial difficulties "ridiculous" and noted that he was pressing forward with KJAZ in spite of calls from prospective buyers, eager to add a station in the market after recent relaxation of ownership rules. The satellite service debuted on June 30, 1993, as the National Jazz Radio Network, a joint venture with Oklahoma-based United Video; cable systems in such places as Orlando, Florida; Richmond, Virginia; and Columbus, Ohio, began offering KJAZ's national signal to their subscribers, while its programming was also offered to other radio stations.

As with KJAZ, the early 1990s were a fraught time for Cowan. He spent years wooing the University of California, San Francisco (UCSF) to build a biotechnology park in Harbor Bay Isle and was close with Willie Brown, then in the California State Assembly. University of California president Jack Peltason ordered an investigation into whether Cowan's friendship with regent Ronald Brady had influenced UCSF's decision to lease space in Harbor Bay Isle. UC officials were found to have attended lavish parties thrown by Cowan, in part to woo university projects, while ignoring rules against accepting gifts.

=== Sale and closure ===
As early as August 1993, reports had Cowan selling KJAZ itself to a foreign-language broadcaster and buying another station as the base for his jazz programming. In February 1994, Cowan officially put the station—America's lone 24-hour commercial jazz outlet—on the market, unable to afford putting more money into the venture. The national satellite service aired on just seven cable systems and two radio stations.

Cowan asked $7 million for the station, even though one media broker, Elliot Evers, told the San Francisco Chronicle that a fair value for the frequency would be $3 million. He noted that the station's central coverage area would likely appeal to broadcasters programming in languages other than English, stating, "My guess is KJAZ will go Spanish or Asian." Listeners began organizing in an effort to save KJAZ, raising $250,000 by early May. That month, Cowan agreed to sell the station for $6 million to Z-Spanish Radio Network, which already owned stations in Fresno, Sacramento, and Walnut Creek. Meanwhile, the station continued selling memberships in hopes of building up enough money to remain on the air as a jazz outlet, reaching $700,000 by early June and $1 million by the middle of the month—far below the $3 million necessary to prevent the sale to Z-Spanish from going forward. Cowan's financial holdings continued to unravel; his debts exceeded assets by over $10 million, he was found to be in default on more than $6 million in loans, and furniture was seized from his mansion to pay for spousal support payments.

The fundraising drive to save KJAZ fell short, and on June 30, Cowan announced that the station would be taken over by Z-Spanish Radio Network and change formats on August 1, 1994. KJAZ made its final FM broadcast on July 31, 1994, with the final song being "Springsville" by Miles Davis. Cowan restored the KJAZ satellite service in November, but owing to insufficient financial support, it closed in August 1995. The KJAZ music collection was donated to KCSM in late 1998; the 20,000 vinyl records and 10,000 CDs included rare LPs from Pat Henry's private collection.

== Carousel of formats and owners ==
Z-Spanish began programming KJAZ on August 1, 1994, after the sign-off. The station changed its call sign to KZSF and began airing the company's "La Z" format of contemporary hits and dance tracks, which originated from its Sacramento-area station, KZSA. Company president Amador Bustos hailed the purchase of the station as its most important to date.

In 1997, Radio One agreed to acquire KZSF and Z-Spanish's KZWC in Walnut Creek for $22 million; these were to be Radio One's first radio properties in the West. The company intended to flip KZSF to an urban format, but not KZWC. In selling, Bustos told Mediaweek, "The price was right ... and there's too much competition on the FM band right now. The market is more appropriate for AM [Spanish radio], and it made all the sense in the world to switch to AM." The KZSF call letters remained with the company for use on AM; the company acquired San Jose AM station KKSJ and renamed it to KZSF. However, Radio One never completed the purchase; instead, Jacor Communications agreed to buy KZWC for $4.5 million and KZSF for $16.5 million. It paired them with its existing KSJO, a rock music station in San Jose, creating the "92-Rock Network"; the station retained the KZSF-FM call sign until February 1999, when it changed to KXJO (matching KSJO as well as KFJO, the renamed KZWC).

Rapid consolidation in the radio industry led to more changes of ownership. Jacor was purchased by Clear Channel Communications in a deal announced in October 1998 and completed in May 1999. Clear Channel then merged with AMFM, Inc., in 2000; the combination had too many San Francisco–area radio stations, and KXJO was earmarked for divestiture to Rodriguez Communications in March 2000. Two months later, KXJO and five other stations in California and Texas were sold to Spanish Broadcasting System (SBS) in a transaction totaling more than $160 million. The Walnut Creek station, then known as KFJO, was divested separately to Chase Radio Properties.

KXJO continued simulcasting KSJO under a lease agreement between SBS and Clear Channel until May 11, 2002, when it adopted a dance music format known as "The Party" and changed its call sign to KPTI. It became the only English-language radio station owned by SBS in the continental U.S.; its other English-language outlets were two stations in Puerto Rico. SBS's relaunch of the station came at a time when Clear Channel was a part-owner of Hispanic Broadcasting Corporation (HBC). In July 2002, SBS sued Clear Channel and HBC, alleging that Clear Channel had used its status to force HBC away from a merger negotiation with SBS and to instead merge with Univision. Its complaint also alleged that Clear Channel representatives defaced KPTI's Oakland studios on May 16, spray-painting explicit graffiti. The messages, which included phrases such as "Radio Is War", "Suck a Dick", and "Fuck the Party!"—were painted in pink and yellow, the colors of rival KYLD "Wild 94.9".

Citing its status as a non-strategic asset geographically and in format within SBS, the company sold the station in a deal announced in October 2003 to Three Point Media—owned by Bruce Buzil and Chris Devine—for $30 million. Buzil and Devine were active radio entrepreneurs. Three Point, which ran the station under a local marketing agreement while the SBS deal worked its way through the FCC, relaunched the station with an urban format as KBTB "Power 92.7, The Beat of the Bay". The new format debuted with 48 straight hours of songs by Tupac Shakur, a rapper who started in Marin County. The station put an intense focus on the East Bay, playing local artists and proclaiming itself "for Oakland, by Oakland". Clear Channel—which owned KYLD and KMEL, the leading contemporary and urban radio stations in the market—retaliated. Employees of KBTB claimed that station events and promotional efforts were sabotaged by a Clear Channel "street team" which went as far as following some KBTB employees home.

== KNGY: Energy 92.7 ==
Three Point had a reputation for quickly flipping stations, having already done so with stations elsewhere in California and Arizona. Some people on online radio boards believed that "Power" was a sort of stunt to raise ratings while the station made a planned tower move to Sutro Tower and the sale was approved. Shortly after Three Point became the licensee in September 2004, it agreed to sell KBTB to Flying Bear Media, a company run by former Infinity Broadcasting sales manager Joe Bayliss and backed by Alta Communications and Tailwind Capital, and fired the entire airstaff. Flying Bear took control on September 22; after a ten-day stunt designed to put distance between it and the hip-hop format, whose loss upset some listeners, the station relaunched as dance music–formatted "Energy 92.7" on October 2. The station continued to be based in Oakland until mid-2005, when it opened studios in the Mission Bay neighborhood of San Francisco and moved to Sutro Tower.

We are not going to show up to Pride once a year and then disappear. If we are going to be part of this community we have to be there 365 days a year, seven days a week.

— Don Bayliss, owner of KNGY

Under Bayliss, KNGY quickly built a reputation as a station that appealed openly to the Bay Area's large and highly influential gay community, with a number of on-air DJs and a sportscaster who were openly gay. Special broadcasts included a broadcast with San Francisco mayor Gavin Newsom for National Coming Out Day. The station also sponsored a number of events in the LGBT community. In 2007, the station sponsored its first Pride event; that same year, two HIV-positive DJs urged a listener boycott after one was dismissed, claiming another employee had made derogatory comments toward him for being HIV-positive. Programs on the station included Fernando and Greg in the Morning and a program hosted by former KGO talk show host Karel.

== KREV: Ed Stolz ownership ==
Flying Bear encountered financial difficulty in the late 2000s and began falling behind on a $6 million loan held by a subsidiary of Wells Fargo. Unable to renegotiate new terms, Wells Fargo sold the station to Golden State Broadcasting, a company controlled by Ed Stolz, for $6.5 million. The acquisition marked a return to Northern California radio for Stolz, who had previously owned KWOD in Sacramento. The sale price represented less than a quarter of the station's $33.7 million valuation by Flying Bear in 2004 (equivalent to $38.3 million in 2009).

Stolz dismissed the 35-person airstaff of KNGY and relaunched the station as KREV "92.7 Rev FM", a mainstream contemporary hit radio station, on September 10, 2009. The new programming was initially delivered from Stolz's facilities in Palm Springs and was similar to the format he had installed at KFRH in Las Vegas.

=== ASCAP lawsuit and receivership ===
From April 2016 to June 2018, on behalf of WB Music and other music companies, the American Society of Composers, Authors and Publishers (ASCAP) successfully sued Stolz-owned Royce International Broadcasting Corporation and its subsidiaries, including KREV, for copyright infringement. The stations did not hold licenses to use music registered with ASCAP but played works covered by the performing rights organization between 2009 and 2012. The result was a $330,000 judgment, increased to over $1.3 million with attorney fees and sanctions.

KREV was transferred into a court-ordered receivership controlled by broker Larry Patrick on July 6, 2020, along with KFRH and KRCK-FM in the Palm Springs market. Stolz continued his refusal to pay the judgment and was found in contempt of court by judge Jesus Bernal in September. Patrick marketed the stations and reached a $6 million deal in December 2020 with VCY America, operator of a national network of Christian talk and preaching stations. Bernal denied a petition from Stolz to end the receivership in March 2021, and VCY America began a local marketing agreement to program KREV, KFRH, and KRCK-FM, paying $5,000 a month for operational control of the three outlets.

Stolz continued to challenge the receivership, arguing that in a Chapter 11 bankruptcy reorganization case, the debtholder should have control of the assets. The United States Trustee in the case concurred with Stolz, while Patrick and a law firm that was a creditor of Stolz argued in favor of the receivership and a conversion to Chapter 7 liquidation. Federal bankruptcy judge August B. Landis ordered Patrick to turn control of KREV and Stolz's two other FM stations back to Stolz's companies in February 2022. VCY America ceased airing its programming. KREV was the last of the three outlets to return to air, resuming operations on October 28 with a dance format under the name "Pirate Radio 92.7".

Stolz's liabilities ultimately became too much to save control. After Stolz failed to propose a reorganization plan, acting on a request filed by the U.S. Trustee from creditors including Patrick, VCY America, and the Bellaire Tower Homeowners Association, the bankruptcy court ordered the appointment of a trustee to manage the Royce International stations in March 2023. The trustee, Michael Carmel, arranged for AutopilotFM, a company controlled by Kurt Nilson, to provide programming for the Stolz stations; AutopilotFM was related to Don Davis, a New Mexico radio station owner who was already providing KREV with its dance music. After rebranding as "Revolution 92.7" in June, KREV was the first station to receive new programming under AutopilotFM, relaunching as hip-hop "92.7 The Hustle" on August 18.

== Sale to KEXP ==
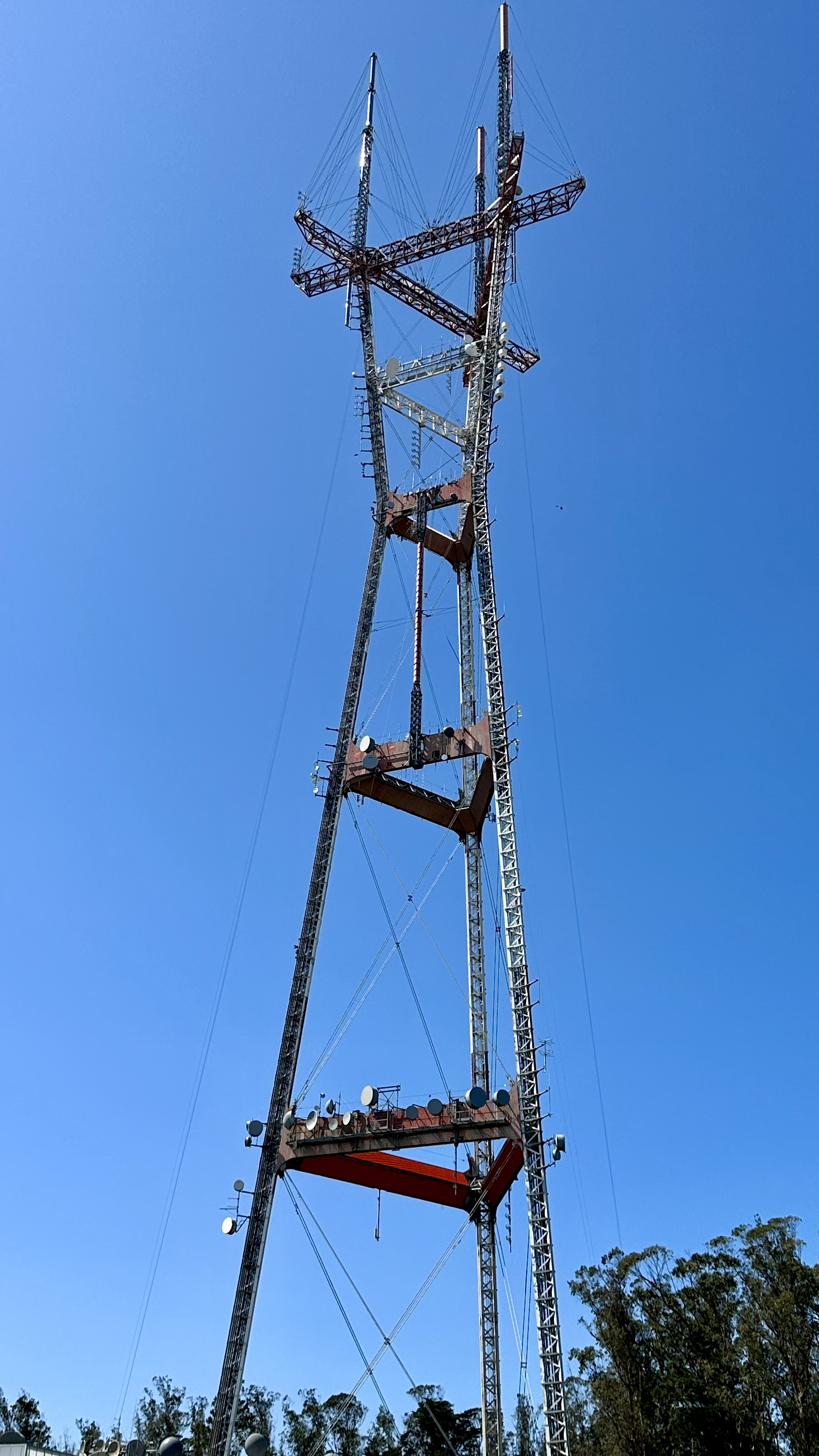
Sutro Tower

During the same week that KREV began broadcasting "The Hustle", the bankruptcy court approved Carmel's plan to conduct an auction of the Stolz stations, with VCY America offering a $4.5 million stalking horse bid for all of them. The bankruptcy auction was held on October 23, 2023; KREV was won by Friends of KEXP, the owner of Seattle non-commercial station KEXP-FM, with a bid of $3.75 million. The CEO of KEXP, Ethan Raup, cited a large streaming audience in the Bay Area and the opportunity to introduce a "low-barrier" listening method there. KEXP announced plans to mirror its Seattle programming on KREV with some content catered towards the Bay Area, such as a region-specific program similar to KEXP's Pacific Northwest music program Audioasis. The transaction was financed through an investment fund set up after a $10 million bequest from an anonymous listener. With the station's existing tower site owner unwilling to continue providing space, Carmel filed to move the station back to Mount Sutro, where it began broadcasting, initially with reduced power, on December 29, 2023. Friends of KEXP reserved the call sign KEXC for the station effective March 19, 2024.

The sale to Friends of KEXP closed in February 2024. Days before the switch, KREV dropped "The Hustle" and began stunting, airing a two-hour sound collage of solfeggio frequencies, shortwave radio static, ambient music and classic Bay Area radio jingles, among other soundbites and song excerpts, for a 72-hour period; this was replaced on March 18 with a mix of music from Bay Area artists.

KEXP programming launched on the station on March 19, 2024, initially consisting of a near-total simulcast with inserts for Bay Area events guides, with the local music show planned to launch in August. On August 6, the show was announced as Vinelands, hosted by Kelley Stoltz and Gabriel Lopez from the studios of KQED-FM as part of a partnership between the two public media broadcasters to house KEXP's San Francisco staff and studio broadcasts in KQED's facility.
