= Clyde Mashore =

American baseball player (1945–2016)

- Outfielder
- Born: May 29, 1945; Concord, California, U.S.
- Died: January 24, 2016 (aged 70); Brentwood, California, U.S.
- Batted: Right Threw: Right

MLB debut
- July 11, 1969, for the Cincinnati Reds

Last MLB appearance
- September 30, 1973, for the Montreal Expos

MLB statistics
- Batting average: .208
- Home runs: 8
- Runs batted in: 47

Teams
- Cincinnati Reds (1969); Montreal Expos (1970–1973)

Clyde Wayne Mashore (May 29, 1945 – January 24, 2016) was an American Major League Baseball outfielder who played in 241 games over five seasons for the Cincinnati Reds and Montreal Expos of the National League. He batted and threw right-handed.

Mashore played football, basketball, track and baseball at Clayton Valley High School in Concord, California, graduating in 1964. He was signed by the Reds prior to the 1964 season as an amateur free agent. He was then drafted by the New York Mets in the 1967 Rule 5 draft, but was returned to the Reds the following spring. He made his major league debut over a year later on July 11, 1969 at age 24. In his first major league at bat (and only one of the season) against the Houston Astros at the Astrodome, he pinch-hit for pitcher Camilo Pascual against pitcher Don Wilson and flied out to right field in a 13-2 Reds loss.

He was dealt from the Reds to the Expos for Ty Cline before the trade deadline on June 15, 1970. His first career hit, RBI and run scored all came on one swing of the bat on September 14, 1970 against the New York Mets at Montreal's Jarry Park. Starting at centerfield and batting seventh, he slugged a two-run homer off Ray Sadecki in the second inning.

In four seasons with Montreal, he played in 239 games, including a personal-best 93 in 1972.

He ended his major league career with eight home runs and 47 runs batted in with 87 hits and a .208 batting average.

Mashore's son Damon Mashore played three major league seasons for the Oakland Athletics and Anaheim Angels. He hit the same number of career home runs as his father (eight), with 41 runs batted in, 120 hits and a .249 batting average. He is currently a minor league coach in the Los Angeles Dodgers minor league organization. Another son, Justin Mashore, played 11 years in the minor leagues, reaching Triple A ball in 1995. Justin is currently an assistant hitting coach for the Texas Rangers.

Clyde Mashore was inducted as a member of the inaugural class of the Clayton Valley High School Hall of Fame in 2008. He lived in Brentwood, California until his death.
