= KMVQ-FM =

Radio station in San Francisco

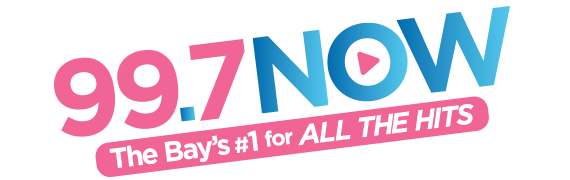
- San Francisco, California; United States
- Broadcast area: San Francisco Bay Area
- Frequency: 99.7 MHz (HD Radio)
- Branding: 99-7 Now

Programming
- Language: English
- Format: Contemporary hit radio
- Subchannels: HD2: Electronic dance music; HD3: Classic rock "K-Fox"

Ownership
- Owner: Connoisseur Media; (Connoisseur Media Licenses, LLC)
- Sister stations: KBLX-FM; KEZR; KOIT; KUFX

History
- First air date: October 12, 1949
- Former call signs: KNBC-FM (1949–1962); KNBR-FM (1962–1975); KNAI-FM (1975–1978); KYUU (1978–1988); KXXX-FM (1988–1991); KFRC-FM (1991–2007)
- Call sign meaning: Movin' Q (previous branding)

Technical information
- Licensing authority: FCC
- Facility ID: 1084
- Class: B
- ERP: 40,000 watts
- HAAT: 396 meters (1,299 ft)
- Transmitter coordinates: 37.687°N 122.436°W
- Repeater: See § FM booster

Links
- Public license information: Public file; LMS
- Webcast: Listen live; Listen live (HD2); Listen live (HD3)
- Website: www.997now.com

KMVQ-FM (99.7 FM) is a commercial radio station licensed to San Francisco, California. It is owned by Connoisseur Media and broadcasts a contemporary hit radio format branded "99-7 Now". KMVQ-FM's studios are located in Daly City.

KMVQ-FM's transmitter is sited along Radio Road on San Bruno Mountain in Brisbane. KMVQ broadcasts using HD Radio technology.

== History ==
=== KNBC-FM, KNBR-FM and KNAI-FM ===
The 99.7 FM frequency was originally owned by NBC as the sister station to KNBR (680 AM). KNBC-FM signed on the air on October 12, 1949. At various times, it aired a middle of the road format as KNBR-FM. It was briefly an all-news station as KNAI-FM, a network affiliate of the short-lived NBC News and Information Service (NIS).

=== KYUU ===
In 1978, NBC decided to take advantage of improving ratings for FM radio, so programmers were hired to create a new format. They came up with a sound similar to top 40 but targeting a market they felt was underserved, adults in the 25-34 age range. Years later, this approach would be labeled as "hot adult contemporary". The station became KYUU.

Over time, the station migrated to more of a mainstream top 40 format as "The Hit Music Station". By 1986, with KITS and KFRC falling out of the top 40 competition and KMEL dominating as the Bay Area's primary top 40 station despite having an urban focus, 99.7 migrated back to its hot AC direction. During much of this time, KYUU's morning host was Don Bleu. Other personalities that worked for KYUU throughout the 1980s include Jeff McNeil (nicknamed "Stinkin' Weasel") and Rick Shaw (not to be confused with Miami's Rick Shaw). Ric Lippincott served as KYUU's program director until he moved to Chicago in January 1987, with Joe Alfenito taking over his role as program director afterward.

=== CHR and X-100 ===
On February 19, 1988, NBC decided to sell all of its owned-and-operated radio stations and concentrate on television, with KYUU being among the last to be sold when Emmis Communications acquired the radio station on September 23 of that same year. While KYUU was in the middle of its ownership transition, KYUU dropped its hot AC format and flipped back to mainstream CHR on April 27, 1988. General manager Terry DeVoto described the move as "music intensive", and radio personalities from KYUU, KOIT, and KIOI wanted a good CHR station in the Bay Area that didn't focus on KMEL's rhythmic lean. Despite many CHR titles being heard on then-AC leaders KYUU and KIOI, KYUU's move to CHR came almost three months after mainstream CHR radio returned to the Bay Area following the launch of the short-lived KHIT in February. (KHIT, itself, would flip three months later.)

Emmis made many changes to all of its former NBC radio stations, and because of major competition in the market, Emmis decided to relaunch the station. On October 5, 1988, at 5:30 pm, KYUU rebranded as "X-100", and changed its call letters to KXXX. Alongside the new branding and call sign, "X-100" remained as the Bay Area's mainstream CHR station to avoid competition against KMEL's rhythmic focus. General manager Jim Smith, formerly of KWSS in San Jose, promised "X-100" would have "more hits and less dancing".

Some notable personalities that worked at "X-100" include George McFly, Chuck Geiger, Super Snake, Rex McNeil and morning hosts Bill Kelly and Al Kline. "X-100" fared poorly, unable to compete with KMEL in the ratings. This led Emmis to sell the station to real estate developer Peter Bedford under his "Coast Broadcasting" division.

=== KFRC-FM ===
KXXX dropped its CHR format and flipped to oldies as KFRC-FM on March 18, 1991. The following month, Bedford bought 610 AM from RKO General, completing the sell-off of RKO's radio division.

In January 1993, Alliance Broadcasting, a company run by former KYUU general manager John Hayes, bought KFRC. On August 12, 1993, KFRC-FM began simulcasting on 610 AM.

This was not KFRC's first attempt at FM broadcasting. For many years, KFRC owned an FM counterpart at 106.1 FM, which carried a variety of formats. In 1977, KFRC's owners sold off the money-losing FM station at 106.1 (which soon became successful AOR station KMEL). Over the next few years, as the FM band eclipsed AM in popularity, it became clear that the owners had made a mistake. This was finally remedied in 1991 under different ownership with the purchase of KXXX.

As KFRC-FM, 99.7 FM simulcast the oldies format of its well-known sister AM station. The oldies format proved successful in the Bay Area market, reaching number one with the 25-54-year-old demographic. In September 1995, Alliance was bought out by Infinity Broadcasting.

In 2005, Infinity Broadcasting (later becoming CBS Radio) traded 610 AM to Christian radio broadcaster Family Stations, the owners of KEAR, for their station at 106.9 FM. On April 29, 2005, Family Stations began simulcasting the signal of their FM station on 610 AM, and the oldies format and KFRC call letters remained at 99.7 FM.

On September 5, 2005, KFRC relaunched its oldies format, this time focusing on 1970s and 1980s music with a low-key approach. The station billed itself as "the Bay Area's Classic Hits".

=== MOViN' 99-7 ===
On September 22, 2006, KFRC switched to a rhythmic adult contemporary format, relaunching this time as "The New Movin' 99.7", though the KFRC-FM call letters remained.

On May 17, 2007, CBS Radio decided to bring back the old KFRC by dropping the "Free FM" talk radio format on 106.9 FM and revived the old classic hits format. In addition, the KFRC call sign would move to 106.9 FM. As a result, 99.7 FM received the new call sign KMVQ.

=== Transition to CHR ===
During the late summer and early fall of 2008, KMVQ evolved to a rhythmic-leaning top 40 format with occasional classic rhythmic songs carried over from the previous format. It became the first mainstream top 40 station for San Francisco in six years since KZQZ flipped to country in 2002. As a result, KMVQ became musically similar to CBS Radio's other newly launched Top 40 stations in Houston, Los Angeles, New York City and Detroit. To fill the void, Clear Channel's KISQ shifted from urban AC to rhythmic AC.

In early 2009, KMVQ added many former DJ's from KYLD, including St. John and Strawberry, to its weekday lineup. Later that year, on November 12, KMVQ added "Fernando and Greg in the Morning" as the station's new morning show, replacing "Baltazar and Maria". The pair are the first openly gay duo to host a morning broadcast on American commercial radio. Before moving to KMVQ, the show was initially established on KNGY.

=== 99-7 NOW ===
In mid-2010, KMVQ changed its logo to match the CBS-owned "AMP Radio" stations in Los Angeles (KAMP-FM) and Detroit (WDZH). The station began using the slogan "All The Hits!" On December 31, 2010, the station re-branded as "99-7 Now" to match the CBS owned WNOW-FM (92-3 Now) in New York City.

On February 2, 2017, CBS Radio announced that it would merge with Entercom. To comply with FCC ownership limits, it was announced that KMVQ, Entercom's KBLX, KOIT, and KUFX, and a cluster in Sacramento, would be divested. Under a local marketing agreement (LMA), Bonneville assumed operations of the stations following the completion of the merger on November 17.

On August 3, 2018, Bonneville announced that it would acquire all of the divested Entercom stations it had been operating for $141 million. The sale was completed on September 21, 2018.

In 2020, KMVQ, along with the other Bay Area Bonneville stations, moved their studios from the SoMa district in San Francisco to a newly built studio along Junipero Serra Boulevard in Daly City.

On October 7, 2025, Connoisseur Media announced it would acquire Bonneville's San Francisco/San Jose cluster for $10 million. The sale closed on May 15, 2026.

== FM booster ==
KMVQ is rebroadcast on the following FM booster:

Call sign	Frequency	City of license	FID	ERP (W)	HAAT	Class	FCC info
KMVQ-FM3	99.7 FM	Walnut Creek, California	1090	185 (Vert.)	927 m (3,041 ft)	D	LMS

== HD Radio ==
KMVQ-FM HD1 airs the same programming as the analog frequency. KMVQ-FM HD2 features a dance format, billed as "Pulse Radio". The move came about after KNGY dropped its dance format for Top 40/CHR in September 2009. The station became a full-time reporter on Billboard's Dance/Mix Show Airplay reporting panel in May 2019.
