= Damon Mashore =

Puerto Rican baseball player (born 1969)

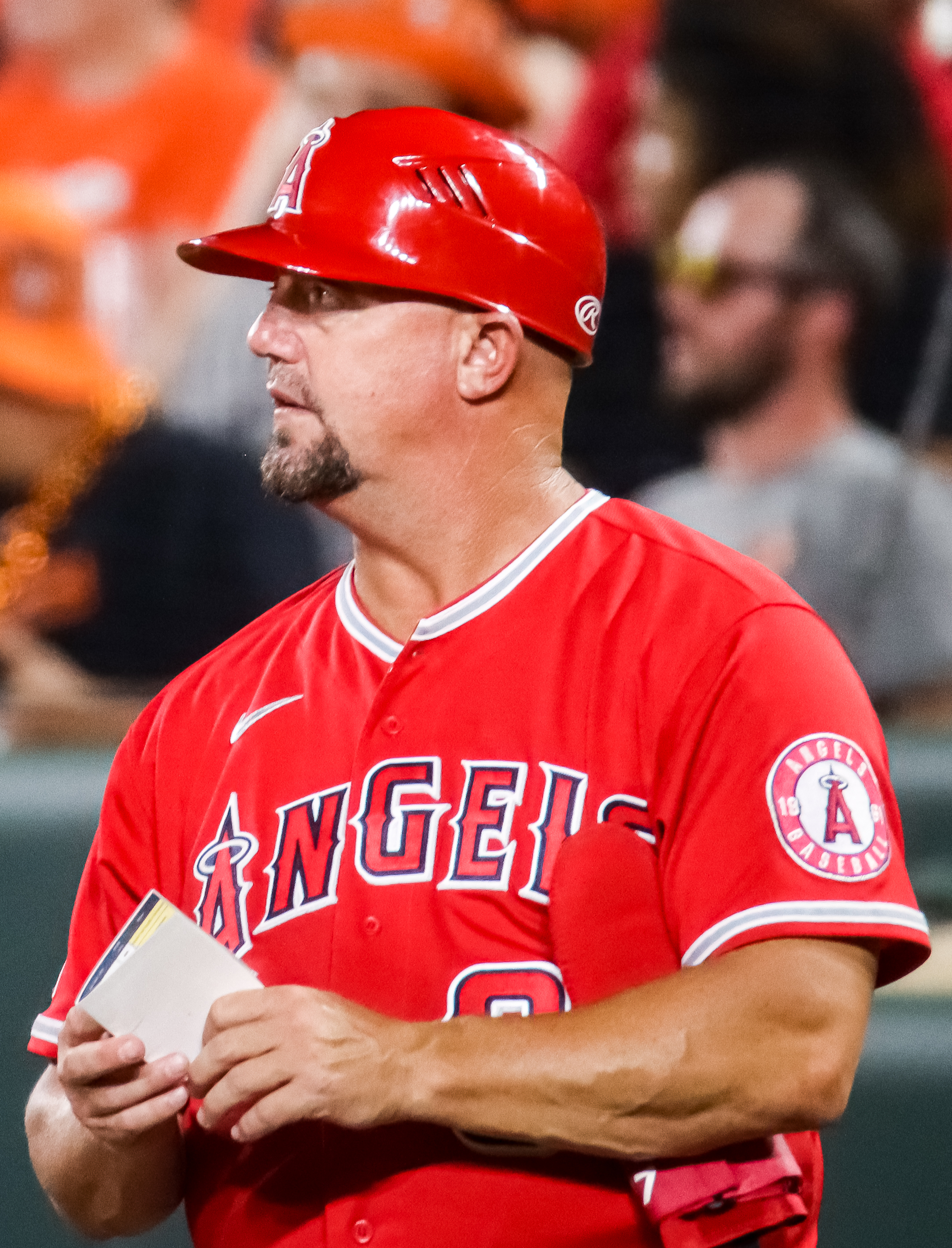
- Mashore with the Los Angeles Angels in 2022
- Outfielder / Coach
- Born: October 31, 1969 (age 56); Ponce, Puerto Rico
- Batted: Right Threw: Right

MLB debut
- June 5, 1996, for the Oakland Athletics

Last MLB appearance
- July 11, 1998, for the Anaheim Angels

MLB statistics
- Batting average: .249
- Home runs: 8
- Runs batted in: 41
- Stats at Baseball Reference

Teams
- Oakland Athletics (1996–1997); Anaheim Angels (1998); As coach: Los Angeles Angels (2022–2023)
Medals
Men's baseball
Representing United States
Goodwill Games
Bronze medal – third place	1990 Seattle	Team

Damon Wayne Mashore (born October 31, 1969) is a Puerto Rican former professional baseball outfielder who played three seasons for the Oakland Athletics and Anaheim Angels of Major League Baseball (MLB). He was later the first base coach for the Los Angeles Angels.

== Career ==
Mashore was born in Puerto Rico in 1969 where his mother was visiting his father, Clyde, while he was playing in the Liga de Béisbol Profesional de Puerto Rico. He turned down scholarship offers to play both college football and college baseball for the Miami Hurricanes.

He played collegiately for the University of Arizona from 1989 to 1991 where he earned Second Team All-America honors from Baseball America in 1991 and third-team laurels the same season from Collegiate Baseball Newspaper.

His father played in the majors from 1969 to 1973, mostly for the Montreal Expos. His brother Justin Mashore is a former assistant hitting coach for the Texas Rangers.

Clyde and Damon Mashore each finished their career with 8 home runs. At the time, this was a record for the most career home runs by a father and son who hit exactly the same number. The record was broken in 2016 by Cecil Fielder and Prince Fielder, who each hit 319 home runs.

== See also ==
- List of Major League Baseball players from Puerto Rico
