= KBAY =

Radio station in San Jose, California

- San Jose, California; United States
- Broadcast area: San Francisco Bay Area
- Frequency: 98.5 MHz (HD Radio)
- Branding: Bay Country 98.5

Programming
- Language: English
- Format: Country
- Subchannels: HD2: Classic rock "98.5 KFOX"

Ownership
- Owner: Connoisseur Media
- Sister stations: KBLX-FM; KMVQ-FM; KOIT; KEZR

History
- First air date: July 1, 1959 (as KRPM)
- Former call signs: KRPM (1959–1971); KOME (1971–1998); KUFX (1998–2026)
- Call sign meaning: Bay Area

Technical information
- Licensing authority: FCC
- Facility ID: 65415
- Class: B
- ERP: 10,000 watts
- HAAT: 268 meters (879 ft)
- Transmitter coordinates: 37.205°N 121.950°W
- Repeaters: 92.1 KKDV (Walnut Creek); 96.5 KOIT-HD3 (San Francisco); See § Boosters

Links
- Public license information: Public file; LMS
- Webcast: Listen live; HD2: Listen live
- Website: www.kbaycountry.com; HD2: www.kfox.com

KBAY (98.5 FM) is a country music radio station licensed to San Jose, California. Its studios are located along Junipero Serra Boulevard in Daly City, and the transmitter is located on Blackberry Hill above Los Gatos.

KBAY is owned by Connoisseur Media after being purchased from Bonneville International in May 2026. Its sister station in San Jose is KEZR.

== History ==
KUFX was originally located at 94.5 FM, then 104.9 FM, and moved to 98.5 FM on June 19, 1998. Before this, the 98.5 frequency was the longtime home to KOME, which is best remembered as a major Bay Area AOR station throughout the 1970s and into the 1990s. Several of the KUFX staff were employed by KOME. KUFX refers to itself as "98.5 KFOX".

KUFX is the official radio station for the San Jose Sharks of the National Hockey League. In a 2006 column, a writer for the San Jose Mercury News noted that he could only listen to a broadcast of a Stanley Cup playoff game on KUFX since his cable company did not carry OLN (later Versus, now NBC Sports Network), which had exclusive television rights to the game. That situation, he noted, provided an ironic twist to him living in the technology-rich Silicon Valley.

The morning show was hosted by Greg Kihn, a musician who had a few Top 40 hit songs in the 1980s, until September 14, 2012.

KFOX also holds a Last Band Standing competition every year, between bands that play classic rock cover songs. The three categories of competition include Cover Bands, Tribute Bands, and Under 18 Bands. The past overall winners are Aja Vu in 2004 (A Steely Dan tribute band and two-time winner of its category), The Strobe in 2005 (An Under 18 band from Leigh High School who specializes with Peter Frampton songs), and last years winner, Sage (a cover band).

In June 1997, KUFX, KBAY, and KBRG were involved in a three-way frequency swap, which saw KUFX moving from 94.5 to 104.9, and later to 98.5 FM. KBAY moved to 94.5, and KBRG got the coveted 100.3 signal and studios. 104.9 eventually became KCNL.

Owner Clear Channel Communications placed the station's assets, along with those of KSJO and KCNL, into an entity called the Aloha Station Trust on August 4, 2008 to seek a buyer for the station. This was due to Clear Channel being above the Federal Communications Commission (FCC) ownership limits. These limits were imposed when Clear Channel was officially taken private by Bain Capital and Thomas H. Lee Partners on July 30, 2008.

On January 11, 2011, Entercom Communications agreed to purchase KUFX, and on January 18, Entercom announced an agreement for the call sign and intellectual property of the company's KDFC-FM in San Francisco and their classical music programming (but not the frequency) to be acquired by the University of Southern California's Classical Public Radio Network. That move allowed them to simulcast KUFX's programming on the 102.1 MHz frequency, as KUFX's main signal on 98.5 only provides grade B coverage of San Francisco. This simulcast switched to 102.1-HD2 on August 1, 2014, when KUZX flipped to rhythmic AC as KRBQ.

On February 2, 2017, CBS Radio announced that it would merge with Entercom. To comply with FCC ownership limits, it was announced that KUFX, along with sister stations KBLX and KOIT, CBS-owned KMVQ, and a cluster in Sacramento, would be divested. Under a local marketing agreement, Bonneville assumed operations of the stations following the completion of the merger on November 17. On August 3, 2018, Bonneville announced that it would acquire all of the divested Entercom stations it had been operating for $141 million; the sale was completed on September 21, 2018.

In 2020, KUFX, along with the other Bonneville stations, moved their studios from the SoMa district in San Francisco into a newly-built studio along Junipero Serra Boulevard in Daly City.

In fall 2025, Bonneville announced plans to sell KUFX and its sister stations in San Francisco to Connoisseur Media for $10 million. This required the FCC to waive local ownership rules, as Connoisseur would control nine FM stations in the Bay Area (the rule is no more than five). The sale closed on May 15, 2026 and the FCC approved the waiver earlier that year. On July 8, 2026 Connoisseur chose to reduce the number of licenses held by selling sister station KBAY to K-Love, Inc.. Following this, Connoisseur further announced on July 16 the country music programming of KBAY would be moved to 98.5 (by coincidence, 94.5 FM had been the original home of the KUFX format and callsign from 1991 to 1997), with the official relaunch set to occur on July 22 at noon. Though the "K-Fox" format would continue through the station's online app, webstream, and would move to KUFX's HD2 subchannel (as well as a joint simulcast on KMVQ-HD3, both of which would replace the "Magic Bay Area" bilingual AC format on those subchannels), it would effectively end the "Fox" format over the air in the Bay Area after 35 years (including the run on the previous frequencies mentioned), and end rock music programming altogether on 98.5 FM after 55 years.

== Boosters ==
KBAY is rebroadcast on the following FM Boosters:

Call sign	Frequency	City of license	FID	ERP (W)	HAAT	Class	FCC info
KBAY-FM2	98.5 FM	Morgan Hill, California	65413	40 (Vert.)	−52 m (−171 ft)	D	LMS
KBAY-FM3	98.5 FM	Pleasanton, California	136624	150 (Horiz.)	302 m (991 ft)	D	LMS

== HD Radio ==
On December 28, 2018, KUFX launched a 1970s hits format on its HD2 subchannel. In early September 2020, the subchannel flipped to a rock format, branded as "Highway 1".

On May 10, 2024 KUFX-HD2 changed its format from rock to bilingual soft adult contemporary, branded as "Bay Area Magic".

== See also ==
- KOME (former occupant of the 98.5 MHz frequency)
- KRBQ (former simulcast)
