= KBLX-FM =

Radio station in Berkeley, California

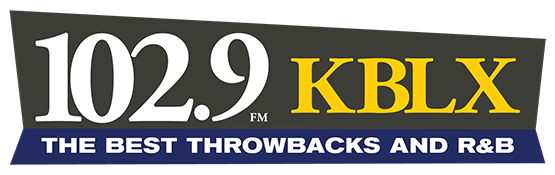
- Berkeley, California; United States
- Broadcast area: San Francisco Bay Area
- Frequency: 102.9 MHz (HD Radio)
- Branding: 102.9 KBLX

Programming
- Format: Urban adult contemporary
- Subchannels: HD2: Classic soul "Old School 102.9 HD2"; HD3: Urban gospel "Praise Bay Area"

Ownership
- Owner: Connoisseur Media
- Sister stations: KMVQ-FM; KOIT; KUFX; KBAY; KEZR

History
- First air date: April 29, 1949
- Former call signs: KRE-FM (1949–1962); KPAT-FM (1962–1973); KRE-FM (1973–1979); KBLX (1979–1986)
- Call sign meaning: "Blax", at one time co-owned with WBLS in New York City

Technical information
- Licensing authority: FCC
- Facility ID: 28670
- Class: B
- ERP: 7,200 watts
- HAAT: 387 meters (1,270 ft)
- Transmitter coordinates: 37°41′21″N 122°26′8″W
- Repeater: See § Booster

Links
- Public license information: Public file; LMS
- Webcast: Listen live Listen live (via Audacy); Listen live (HD2); Listen live (HD3)
- Website: www.kblx.com

KBLX-FM (102.9 MHz) is a commercial radio station licensed to Berkeley, California, and serving the San Francisco Bay Area. It is owned by Connoisseur Media. The radio studios and offices are along Junipero Serra Boulevard in Daly City. The transmitter is atop the San Bruno Mountains.

Until its sale in April 2012, KBLX was owned for more than 30 years by the now-defunct, black-owned Inner City Broadcasting Corporation, and used the slogan "The Quiet Storm."

== History ==
=== KRE-FM and KPAT-FM ===
On April 29, 1949, the station signed on as KRE-FM. It mostly simulcast the programming of co-owned KRE (1400 AM). In 1962, the station changed its call letters to KPAT-FM. In 1973, it changed its call letters back to KRE-FM. Donnell Lewis, a blues musician, approached KRE to do one night a week of blues programming.

The idea caught on. KRE-FM, which had previously played religious programs and Top 40 music, became one of the first commercial full-time "fusion" stations playing blues, R&B, Latin pop, reggae, jazz and world music. It supported local artists who frequently stopped by to visit with the deejays on the air to talk about new recordings and gigs.

The station frequently produced live broadcasts out in the community, including at the Oakland Community School when Huey Newton came home from Cuba. The station was the first to break records by Pete and Sheila Escovedo, Bill Summers, Sylvester, and other Bay Area artists. When Inner City Broadcasting purchased the station, it eliminated the unique format and changed it to more mainstream urban sound with less interaction with local artists and the community.

=== KBLX "Soft and Warm, The Quiet Storm" ===
In 1979, the station was sold to the New York–based Inner City Broadcasting Corporation, headed by Percy Sutton (which also owned WBLS), and was relaunched as KBLX (the call letters KBLS, which would otherwise honor its sister-station relationship with WBLS, were unavailable, assigned to another station in Kansas). While WBLS played a variety of urban music, KBLX focused more on and urban adult contemporary format, calling itself The Quiet Storm. KBLX marketed the station as an adult contemporary format, rather than urban, in order to attract a wider audience.

Throughout the 1980s, the station played an eclectic mix of R&B, smooth jazz and soft pop, reflecting the diverse music culture of the Bay Area. KBLX was the inspiration for the creation and launch of various adult contemporary radio formats across the country, from smooth jazz to soft rock to urban AC. (The urban AC terminology did not exist until 1988). Even then, for some time the station played mostly smooth R&B, rarely playing any uptempo R&B, current or old school. This was done to establish the station's own identity apart from competition from now-defunct Urban stations KSOL and KDIA, or its current competitor 106.1 KMEL. The station's musical selection was also forged by competition with smooth-jazz rival 103.7 KKSF.

Even when KBLX quietly modified its format to urban AC in the 1990s, the station continued to play jazz music in rotation—and this practice of mixing R&B and jazz songs on radio playlists has occurred on few urban AC radio stations in some markets. However, KBLX played more R&B songs than jazz; the result was a gradual phasing out of jazz from its playlist in recent years. From then on, KBLX has evolved into a true urban AC station today, playing current and old school R&B, as well as uptempo R&B songs to match its competitors. Despite the changes, it still advertises itself as a "Smooth R&B" station, reflecting its "Quiet Storm" heritage handle —- although the station did re-integrate jazz vocals into its overall sound after KKSF switched from smooth jazz to classic rock in June 2009. The station has hosted the annual Stone Soul Picnic, which was first held at the Dunsmuir Hellman Historic Estate in Oakland in 1998. It outgrew the location and since 2004, was held at Pioneer Amphitheatre in Hayward before relocating the venue at Sleep Train Pavilion in Concord.

For many years, KBLX and its AM sister station, KRE, were the Bay Area's only African-American-owned and operated commercial radio stations. From its inception in 1979, KBLX simulcast on KRE (later KBLX) until 1994, when the AM station was re-launched as KVTO, with a World Ethnic format, primarily serving the San Francisco Bay Area's Asian community. KVTO is now an affiliate of the Sing Tao Chinese Radio network and broadcasts in Chinese.

=== KBLX-FM "R&B 102.9" ===
Logo used until 2018

On August 22, 2011, ICBC's creditors petitioned the United States Bankruptcy Court to force the firm to declare Chapter 11 bankruptcy on grounds that the company's executives failed to accept a buyout offer. The filing resulted in majority control of ICBC being taken over by Ron Burkle's Yucaipa Companies, and basketball legend Earvin "Magic" Johnson's Magic Johnson Enterprises as YMF Media. Only KBLX was intended to be sold to a different owner, leaving KVTO and KVVN to defect to YMF Media.

Entercom Communications announced the purchase of the station on April 1, 2012, for $25 million cash. The company announced its intention of keeping KBLX's format. Entercom officially took control of the station on May 1, 2012, and fired the entire on-air staff of KBLX (except traffic reporter Joe McConnell). The firings included morning personality and program director Kevin Brown after 22 years, and the original general manager of the station. It ended "The Quiet Storm" format on KBLX after 33 years and transitioned the station to "R&B 102.9, The New KBLX", and added The Steve Harvey Morning Show. These corporate decisions were met with controversy and anger from longtime listeners of KBLX who felt that the heritage of the station built upon "The Quiet Storm" was destroyed when the station turned into a more mainstream R&B station. The station's license was assigned to Entercom effective June 28, 2012.

On October 12, 2015, KBLX replaced Steve Harvey with a new local morning show hosted by Oakland-born Mark Curry, who starred on the ABC sitcom Hangin' with Mr. Cooper, and was a frequent host of the syndicated music competition series Showtime At The Apollo. On KBLX, Curry is teamed with weekender/music director Kimmie Taylor and former afternoon host Victor "Big Daddy" Zaragoza.

On February 2, 2017, CBS Radio announced that it would merge with Entercom. To comply with FCC ownership limits, it was announced that KBLX, along with sister stations KOIT and KUFX, CBS-owned KMVQ, and a cluster in Sacramento, would be divested. Bonneville International assumed operations of the stations on behalf of a holding trust following the closure of the merger on November 17. On August 3, 2018, Bonneville announced that it would acquire the stations outright for $141 million; the sale was completed on September 21, 2018.

In 2020, KBLX, along with the other Bonneville stations, moved their studios from the SoMa district in San Francisco into a newly-built studio along Junipero Serra Boulevard in Daly City.

On January 11, 2023, the station's HD3 subchannel added a gospel format, branded as "Praise Bay Area".

In Fall 2025, Bonneville announced plans to sell KBLX and its Bay Area sister stations to Connoisseur Media for $10 million. The sale closed on May 15, 2026.

== Booster ==
KBLX is rebroadcast on the following FM booster:

Call sign	Frequency	City of license	FID	ERP (W)	HAAT	Class	FCC info
KBLX-FM2	102.9 FM	Pleasanton, California	88317	185 (Vert.)	927 m (3,041 ft)	D	LMS
