= Diablo Valley =

Diablo Valley Spanish: Valle del Diablo
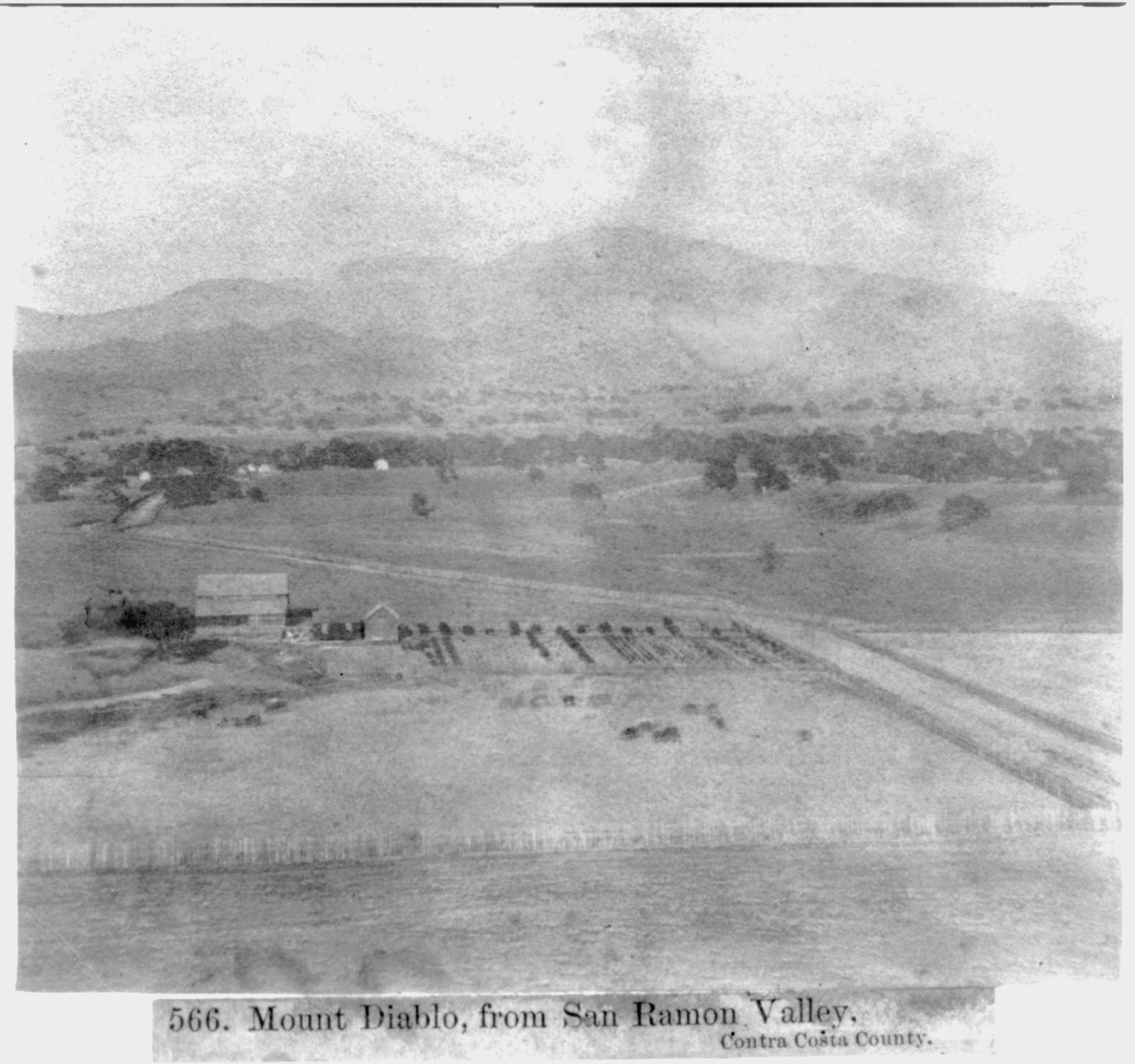
- A view of Mount Diablo from the San Ramon Valley
- Interactive map of Diablo Valley
- Coordinates: 37.9419°N 122.0598°W

The Diablo Valley refers to a valley in the East Bay of the San Francisco Bay Area, to the west/northwest of Mount Diablo. The valley contains the cities of Clayton, Concord, Martinez, Pleasant Hill (home to Diablo Valley College), most of Walnut Creek (The southern end is a part of the San Ramon Valley) and the CDP of Pacheco. The Diablo Valley has a diverse population both ethnically, and socio-economically. West of the Diablo Valley lies the Briones Regional Park and the Lamorinda area.
