= KEZR =

Radio station in San Jose, California

- San Jose, California; United States
- Broadcast area: Santa Clara Valley; Salinas–Monterey
- Frequency: 106.5 MHz
- Branding: Mix 106.5

Programming
- Format: Hot adult contemporary
- Affiliations: Premiere Networks

Ownership
- Owner: Connoisseur Media; (Alpha Media Licensee LLC)
- Sister stations: KBAY | KUFX | KOIT | KMVQ | KBLX

History
- First air date: July 3, 1967 (as KPLX)
- Former call signs: KPLX (1967–1972); KPSJ (1972–1973)
- Call sign meaning: "EZ Rock"

Technical information
- Licensing authority: FCC
- Facility ID: 1176
- Class: B
- ERP: 42,000 watts directional
- HAAT: 163 meters (535 ft)
- Transmitter coordinates: 37°12′31.8″N 121°46′30.8″W

Links
- Public license information: Public file; LMS
- Webcast: Listen live
- Website: www.mix1065sanjose.com

KEZR (106.5 FM, "Mix 106.5") is a radio station licensed to San Jose, California, and serving the southern San Francisco Bay Area. KEZR airs an Hot adult contemporary format and is owned by Connoisseur Media through the licensee Alpha Media Licensee LLC. Co-owned with KBAY, its studios are located in South San Jose just off US 101 on Hellyer Ave, and the transmitter is based from a site in Santa Teresa County Park.

== History ==
KEZR debuted in 1967 as KPLX under the ownership of Bay Area broadcaster Les Malloy, operating from studios in the Hotel Sainte Claire in downtown San Jose. In December 1971, Malloy sold the station to PSA Broadcasting, a subsidiary of San Diego-based Pacific Southwest Airlines, for $330,000. In mid-1973, the station’s call letters were changed from KPSJ to KEZR; it has programmed minor variations of adult contemporary music since then.

KEZR has held many mixers and events with several famous artists including Sara Bareilles, Jason Mraz, and Augustana.

Before it was purchased by NextMedia Group, the station was briefly owned by CBS Radio, who moved the station from San Jose to San Francisco. Prior to that, it was owned for a long period by the Levitt family. During this period, particularly the 1990s, KEZR was a dominant force in Bay Area radio, regularly topping the Arbitron ratings.

NextMedia sold their 33 radio stations to Digity, LLC for a purchase price of $85 million; the transaction was consummated on February 10, 2014. Alpha Media then acquired Digity for $264 million in February 2016. Alpha Media merged with Connoisseur Media on September 4, 2025. In May 2026, Connoisseur purchased four Bay Area stations from Bonneville International, making them sister stations to KEZR.
