= List of radio stations in the San Francisco Bay Area =

The San Francisco Bay Area is currently the fourth-largest radio market in the United States. While most stations originate in San Francisco, this list includes stations from San Jose, which ranks as the 37th largest radio market but is also considered an embedded market within the Bay Area.

Currently, radio stations that primarily serve the San Francisco Bay Area include:

== Broadcast radio ==
=== AM stations ===
- 610 KEAR San Francisco (Family Radio)
- 680 KNBR San Francisco (Sports)^{1}
- 740 KCBS San Francisco (All-news)
- 810 KSFO San Francisco (Conservative talk)^{1}
- 860 KTRB San Francisco (Conservative talk)
- 910 KKSF Oakland (Black Information Network)
- 960 KNEW Oakland (Sports and conservative talk)
- 1010 KIQI San Francisco (Spanish talk/brokered)
- 1050 KTCT San Mateo (Sports)
- 1100 KFAX San Francisco (Christian)
- 1170 KLOK San Jose (Punjabi)
- 1190 KDYA Vallejo (Gospel)^{2}
- 1220 KDOW Palo Alto (Business news)
- 1260 KSFB San Francisco (Relevant Radio)
- 1310 KMKY Oakland (Hindi/Punjabi/South Asian)
- 1370 KZSF San Jose (Regional Mexican)
- 1400 KVTO Berkeley (Sing Tao Chinese Radio)
- 1430 KVVN Santa Clara (Vietnamese)
- 1450 KEST San Francisco (Multilingual/New Age talk)
- 1500 KSJX San Jose (Vietnamese)
- 1510 KSFN Piedmont (Regional Mexican)
- 1550 KZDG San Francisco (Radio Zindagi)
- 1590 KLIV San Jose (Vietnamese)
- 1640 KDIA Vallejo (Christian)

^{1} clear-channel station
^{2} daytime-only station

=== FM stations ===
Asterisk (*) indicates a non-commercial (public radio/campus/educational) broadcast.

- 87.7 KBKF-LD San Jose (Air1)
- 88.1 KECG El Cerrito (Campus/variety)*
- 88.1 KSRH San Rafael (Campus/variety)*
- 88.5 KQED-FM San Francisco (NPR/talk)*
- 88.9 K-LOVE
- 89.1 KCEA Atherton (Campus/adult standards)*
- 89.3 KMVS Moss Beach (K-Love)*
- 89.3 KPFB Berkeley (Pacifica Radio)*
- 89.3 KOHL Fremont (College/CHR)*
- 89.3 KMTG San Jose (Campus/variety)*
- 89.5 KPOO San Francisco (Community/variety)*
- 89.7 KFJC Los Altos (College/variety)*
- 89.9 KCRH Hayward (College/variety)*
- 90.1 KZSU Stanford (College/variety)*
- 90.3 KDFC San Francisco (Classical)*
- 90.5 KSJS San Jose (College/variety)*
- 90.5 KVHS Concord (College/variety)*
- 90.5 KWMR Point Reyes Station (Community)*
- 90.7 KALX Berkeley (College/variety)*
- 91.1 KCSM San Mateo (College/jazz)*
- 91.5 KKUP Cupertino (Community/variety)*
- 91.7 KALW San Francisco (NPR/talk/variety)*
- 92.1 KKDV Walnut Creek (Country, KBAY relay)
- 92.3 KSJO San Jose (Bollywood music)
- 92.7 KEXC San Francisco (Variety)*
- 93.3 KRZZ San Francisco (Regional Mexican)
- 93.7 KXZM Felton (Regional Mexican)
- 94.1 KPFA Berkeley (Pacifica Radio)*
- 94.5 KBAY Gilroy (Country)
- 94.9 KYLD San Francisco (Contemporary hit radio)
- 95.3 KJLV San Jose (K-Love)
- 95.7 KGMZ-FM San Francisco (Sports)
- 96.1 KSQQ Morgan Hill (Sing Tao Chinese Radio)
- 96.5 KOIT San Francisco (Adult contemporary)
- 97.3 KLLC San Francisco (Hot AC)
- 97.7 KWAI Los Altos (Air1)*
- 98.1 KISQ San Francisco (Soft AC)
- 98.5 KUFX San Jose (Country, KBAY relay)
- 98.9 KSOL San Francisco (Regional Mexican)
- 99.1 KSQL Santa Cruz (Regional Mexican)
- 99.7 KMVQ-FM San Francisco (Contemporary hit radio)
- 100.3 KBRG San Jose (Spanish AC)
- 100.7 KVVZ San Rafael (Reggaeton)
- 101.3 KIOI San Francisco (Hot AC)
- 101.7 KKIQ Livermore (Adult contemporary)
- 102.1 KRBQ San Francisco (Classic hip hop)
- 102.5 KSFP-LP San Francisco (Public Radio/Talk)*
- 102.9 KBLX-FM Berkeley (Urban AC)
- 103.3 KSCU Santa Clara (College/variety)*
- 103.7 KOSF San Francisco (Classic hits)
- 104.5 KNBR-FM San Francisco (Sports) (HD simulcast of KNBR-AM)
- 104.9 KXSC Sunnyvale (Classical)* (simulcast of KDFC)
- 105.3 KITS San Francisco (Alternative rock)
- 105.7 KVVF Santa Clara (Reggaeton)
- 106.1 KMEL San Francisco (Urban contemporary)
- 106.5 KEZR San Jose (Hot AC)
- 106.9 KFRC-FM San Francisco (All-news)
- 107.3 KLVS Livermore (K-Love)*
- 107.7 KSAN San Mateo (Classic rock)

=== Defunct ===
- KABN/Concord (1961–2004)
- KDN/San Francisco (1921–23)
- KGB/San Francisco (1921–22)
- KGEI/Redwood Shores (1939–94)
- KSFH/Mountain View (1976-2021)
- KYY/San Francisco (1921–23)
- KZM/Oakland (1921–31)
- KZY/Oakland (1921–23)
