= KJLV =

KJLV may refer to:

- KJLV (FM), a radio station (95.3 FM) licensed to serve Los Gatos, California, United States
- KWAI (FM), a radio station (97.7 FM) licensed to serve Los Altos, California, which held the call sign KJLV from 2019 to 2023
- KLFJ (FM), a radio station (105.3 FM) licensed to Hoxie, Arkansas, United States, which held the call sign KJLV from 2001 to 2019
- KMKL (FM), a radio station (90.3 FM) licensed to serve North Branch, Minnesota, United States, which held the call sign KJLV in 2001
