= KMPH =

KMPH may refer to:

- KMPH-TV, a television station (channel 28, virtual 26) licensed to serve Visalia, California, United States
- KMPH-CA, a defunct KMPH-TV translator station (channel 17) formerly licensed to serve Merced-Mariposa, California
- KMPH (AM), a radio station (840 AM) licensed to serve Modesto, California
- Kilometres per hour
