= KSTN =

KSTN may refer to:

- KSTN (AM), a radio station (1420 AM) licensed to Stockton, California, United States
- KNVE (FM), a radio station (91.3 FM) licensed to Redding, California, which held the call sign KSTN-FM from 2010 to 2015
