= KAZA (AM) =

- Gilroy, California; United States
- Broadcast area: Santa Clara Valley
- Frequency: 1290 kHz
- Branding: Viên Thao

Programming
- Language: Vietnamese
- Format: Music and talk

Ownership
- Owner: Tron Dinh Do; (Intelli, LLC)

History
- First air date: August 31, 1957
- Former call signs: KPER (1957–1967)

Technical information
- Licensing authority: FCC
- Facility ID: 54572
- Class: D
- Power: 1,500 watts (day); 19 watts (night)
- Transmitter coordinates: 36°57′48.8″N 121°29′25.8″W

Links
- Public license information: Public file; LMS
- Website: vienthao.com

KAZA (1290 AM) is a commercial radio station licensed to Gilroy, California, United States, and serving the Santa Clara Valley. It airs a format of Vietnamese language music and talk, and is branded Viên Thao Radio. The station is owned by Tron Dinh Do, through licensee Intelli, LLC.

== History ==
KPER was founded by Don Bernard and Chuck Jobbins, co-owners of the Bernard & Jobbins Broadcasting Company. After being granted a construction permit by the Federal Communications Commission (FCC) on January 23 that year, the station first broadcast on August 31, 1957, with call sign KPER and five watts of power. The FCC officially granted KPER its broadcast license on November 21, 1957, and KPER increased its transmitting power to 500 watts and was licensed as a daytime-only station. A member of the Keystone Broadcasting System, KPER also broadcast programming in Spanish and Portuguese. KPER increased its power to 1,000 watts on January 21, 1959. On May 2, 1963, KPER increased its power to 5,000 watts.

On October 3, 1966, Bernard & Jobbins sold KPER to South Valley Broadcasters for $325,000. KPER became KAZA on July 15, 1967. By 1968, KAZA began broadcasting 85 hours of Spanish programming weekly, in contrast to seven hours of Portuguese.

South Valley Broadcasters sold KAZA to Radio Fiesta on March 29, 1973, for $522,500.

KAZA began carrying Spanish language broadcasts of Oakland Raiders games in 2002, the most recent season the Raiders made the Super Bowl. The broadcasts continued for the 2003 season, before they moved to KZSF in 2004.

In November 2010, Tron Dinh Do's Intelli LLC began operating KAZA on a local marketing agreement with Radio Fiesta and began broadcasting the Vietnamese language Viên Thao Radio network. Radio Fiesta ultimately sold KAZA to Intelli for $1,000,000 in October 2014.

== See also ==
- KZSJ
- KVVN
