= WGRU =

WGRU may refer to:

- WGRU-LP, a low-power radio station (99.1 FM) licensed to serve Riverdale, Georgia, United States
- WPGS, a radio station (840 AM) licensed to serve Mims, Florida, United States, which held the call sign WGRU from 2009 to 2011
