= KLIV =

- San Jose, California; United States
- Broadcast area: Santa Clara Valley
- Frequency: 1590 kHz
- Branding: 星島中文電台 (Sing Tao Chinese Radio)

Programming
- Language: Mandarin Chinese

Ownership
- Owner: Phuong Pham; (Pham Radio Communication LLC)
- Sister stations: KVTO, KVVN

History
- First air date: September 19, 1946; 79 years ago (as KSJO)
- Former call signs: KSJO (1946–1960)

Technical information
- Licensing authority: FCC
- Facility ID: 19531
- Class: B
- Power: 6,200 watts day 5,000 watts night
- Transmitter coordinates: 37°19′46.8″N 121°52′1.8″W

Links
- Public license information: Public file; LMS
- Website: www.chineseradio.com

KLIV (1590 AM) is a broadcast radio station in the United States. Licensed to San Jose, California, KLIV serves San Jose and the Santa Clara Valley with a talk and entertainment format in Mandarin Chinese. Owned by Phuong Pham, it is one of the last independently owned stations in the Bay Area.

KLIV began broadcasting in 1946 as KSJO before becoming KLIV in 1960. The station had a top-40 format in the 1960s and changed to big band in 1981. From 1991 to 2016, KLIV had a news format before changing to classic country. In 2019, KLIV was shut down after the transmitter site was sold. The station resumed broadcasting in 2020 and was sold to Pham Radio Communication, ending over 50 years of ownership by Empire Broadcasting.

KLIV had been the flagship station for San Jose State University sports from 1946 to 1952, then 1991 until the station's closure in 2019, in addition to broadcasting Santa Clara University men's basketball games during the 2010s. KLIV was the flagship station for the San Jose Clash (later Earthquakes) from 1996 to 2016.

== History ==
=== Early years (1946–1991) ===
The first sign-on for KLIV was on September 19, 1946, with call sign KSJO. Originally, KSJO was a daytime-only station with 1,000 watts of power; broadcasting hours were 6:45 a.m. to 6:15 p.m., with initial operating costs at $125,000. Its facilities were at Story Road and Lucretia Avenue in central San Jose, with a KSJO FM station. Both stations were owned by the Santa Clara Broadcasting Company. called KSJO KSJO-AM began nighttime broadcast at 500 watts in 1947. The station promoted its call sign as a backronym for "San Jose's Own". Among its earliest programs were local news, United Press news, music, and San Jose State College football. KSJO continued broadcasting San Jose State football until 1952, after which the game broadcasts transferred to KEEN.

In June 1960, the original owners of KSJO sold the station to Cal-Radio Inc., which renamed the station KLIV and boosted its signal to 5,000 watts in 1961. KLIV began its Top 40 format in 1962, three years before KFRC in San Francisco.

KLIV personality Brian Lord discovered the single "Psychotic Reaction" by local psychedelic rock band the Count Five, a song that later made the Rock and Roll Hall of Fame.

On July 1, 1967, KLIV was bought for around $974,000 by Empire Broadcasting, led by former Rochester, New York radio executives Robert S. Kieve and James Trayhern and a group of Rochester investors.

KLIV's primary genre shifted with emerging musical trends in the 1970s. KLIV changed its musical genre to hard rock in 1970 before changing to adult contemporary in 1972. In March 1979, KLIV became the first San Jose station that specialized in disco. As disco became less popular later in the year, KLIV changed to an album-oriented rock format dubbed "Rock 16" on October 25, 1979.

On May 7, 1981, KLIV switched to the syndicated "Music of Your Life" format that played big band and pop standards from the 1950s and earlier.

=== News era (1991–2016) ===
KLIV's final logo as a news station; variants of this logo have been used since the early 2000s.

KLIV converted to an all-news format in April 1991. In its new format, KLIV simulcast CNN Headline News (now HLN) and the 5 p.m. newscast from San Jose television station KNTV, in addition to local news and traffic reports each hour. Also beginning in 1991, KLIV was the flagship station for San Jose State University football and men's basketball. By 1995, KLIV began simulcasting the 6 a.m. and 6 p.m. KNTV newscasts as well. In contrast to San Francisco's KCBS, traffic reports on KLIV focused on the South Bay. Then in 1996, KLIV began broadcasting games of the San Jose Clash (later Earthquakes) of the newly formed Major League Soccer. KLIV's sports coverage also added select San Jose Lasers basketball games in 1998.

However, KLIV struggled in the ratings. In the fall 1997 ratings period, KLIV was the lowest-rated English-language station in San Jose, overshadowed by KGO and KSFO, competing San Francisco-based stations that carried talk shows in addition to news coverage. Kieve acknowledged in 2016 that as KLIV never made a profit as a news station and was subsidized by co-owned FM country station KRTY.

By the late 1990s, as the Telecommunications Act of 1996 paved the way for the increased consolidation of radio station ownership, KLIV and the Empire Broadcasting family of stations were among the final locally owned stations in the Bay Area.

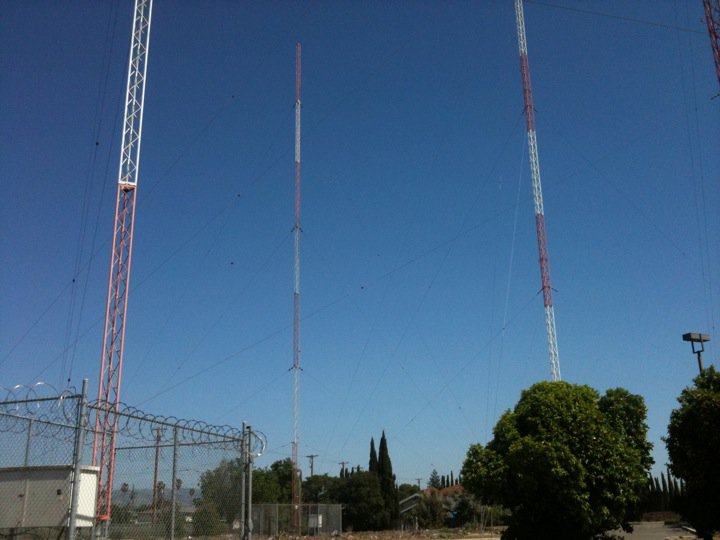
KLIV MW Antenna Array in 2011

KLIV lost the rights to San Jose State sports in 2005 to Palo Alto's KNTS. In 2006, KLIV resumed broadcasting San Jose State football games. Men's basketball games returned in December 2008.

As CNN Headline News shifted its evening programming away from general news reporting to personality-driven talk shows, KLIV introduced its own local lineup of evening programming in February 2007, including a monthly call-in show with the mayor of San Jose, a talk show hosted by the CEO of the Silicon Valley Leadership Group called The CEO Show, and speeches from the San Jose Rotary Club and the Commonwealth Club of California. Beginning on April 2, 2007, KLIV reduced the CNN Headline News simulcast to overnights and weekends. Between 6 a.m. and 11 p.m., KLIV began hours with news briefs from CNN Radio featured more locally produced news and content each hour.

In 2009, KLIV began broadcasting a weekly talk show with the San Jose State football head coach during football seasons.

In 2011, KLIV added nationally syndicated programs on weekends, such as The Clark Howard Show, Popular Science Radio, and Into Tomorrow.

Effective April 1, 2012, KLIV became an affiliate of NBC News Radio, after CNN Radio shut down. KLIV became an affiliate of the Santa Clara Broncos radio network in the 2012–13 season.

As a tribute to its top-40 format from the 1960s, KLIV launched an Overnight Oldies program in February 2015 playing hits from the 1950s through 1970s, beginning at midnight until 5 a.m. on weekday mornings, and 6 a.m. weekends.

=== Switch to Classic country (2016–2019) ===
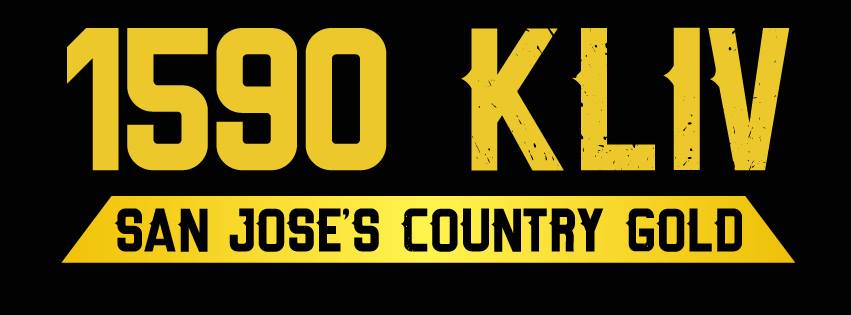
KLIV's logo during the classic country format

On April 11, 2016, the station announced it would abandon its all-news format and switch to a classic country format, dubbed "Country Gold". In an on-air commentary discussing the change, company president Bob Kieve blamed declining advertising revenue (primarily due an older-skewing listener base) and the increasing costs of running a news station. He bought out most of his news staff. The switch to the classic country format happened at 10 p.m. on June 10, 2016. The music played was usually from the years 1988 to 2002. KLIV continued to carry South Bay traffic and weather reports after the format change. Initially, KLIV simulcast the morning show of sister FM station KRTY, which plays newer country music, before launching its own morning show in May 2017.

In addition to San Jose State basketball, KLIV broadcast 26 of 33 games of the 2016–17 Santa Clara Broncos men's basketball team.

In March 2017, KLIV lost the rights to San Jose Earthquakes games to KTCT, a Cumulus Media-owned station in San Francisco. The Bay Area Radio Museum honored KLIV with its Legendary Station Award in the same month. Later in 2017, KLIV began broadcasting CIF Central Coast Section high school football and basketball games.

=== Shutdown and sale (2019–present) ===
KLIV went silent on January 28, 2019 following the sale of the station's studio and transmitter site on Story Road in San Jose's Little Saigon neighborhood, as well as additional financial losses and low ratings with the "Country Gold" classic country format. At 11:59pm that night, after a final sign off, KLIV's transmitter was shut off for the final time. Kieve indicated an intention for Empire Broadcasting to eventually donate the license to the city of San Jose, with the intent of using the station to broadcast city council meetings, committee meetings and other civic events.

On April 3, 2019, the FCC granted KLIV a Special Temporary Authority (STA). After Empire filed an extension request "for continuing financial reasons," the FCC extended the STA in September 2019. After being granted a six-month Special Temporary Authority on January 21, 2020, KLIV resumed broadcasting from a temporary 500-watt antenna, two days in advance of a one-year period the FCC allows stations to be silent before losing their licenses. The Mercury News reported that the revived KLIV played a commercial-free mix of "oldies and country classics."

Empire sold KLIV to Pham Radio Communications for $100,000 in March 2020. Pham owns Asian ethnic stations in the Bay Area, Vietnamese KVVN in Santa Clara and Chinese KVTO in Berkeley. Due to financial reasons, KLIV again went silent on July 15, 2020, with the broadcast license set to expire automatically if the station does not resume operations within a year. The sale was consummated on September 21, 2020. KLIV resumed broadcasting on July 11, 2021 with a Vietnamese format. KLIV began broadcasting Sing Tao Chinese Radio programming in 2025.
