= Rose Aguilar =

American journalist

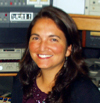
- Education: Saint Mary's College of California
- Occupation: Journalist

Rose Aguilar is a progressive journalist and radio host from San Francisco, California.

== Career ==
=== Radio ===
Since 2006, Aguilar has hosted Your Call, a daily public affairs radio show on NPR-affiliate KALW FM 91.7. Prior to becoming the show's host, Aguilar was a producer and guest host for the show. Aguilar formerly hosted the Activist Beat with Rose Aguilar, "a weekly roundup of progressive activism that the mainstream media ignores, undercovers, or misrepresents." Before joining KALW, Aguilar spent eight years as a reporter with CNET Radio, where she reported on technology's impact on society.

=== Author ===
Aguilar is the author of Red Highways: A Liberal's Journey into the Heartland, which documented a six-month road trip she took to the so-called "red states" to interview people about issues and voting tendencies. She is a contributor to the book Red State Rebels: Tales of Grassroots Resistance in the Heartland. Aguilar writes a weekly commentary for KPFK. She also writes for AlterNet and Truthout, and offers political analysis for the BBC.

=== Community involvement ===
Aguilar sits on the board of the Women's Intercultural Network (WIN), a non-profit organization working to connect girls and women across borders. She speaks about the media, women's issues, and progressive politics on panels and at conferences. Aguilar is a member of the Native American Journalists Association, San Francisco Women on the Web and Journalism and Women Symposium.

== Personal life ==
Aguilar is a vegan.
