= Your Call =

- Genre: Talk radio
- Running time: ca. 52 min.
- Country of origin: United States
- Language: English
- Home station: KALW
- Syndicates: KALW
- Hosted by: Rose Aguilar; Sandip Roy
- Produced by: Malihe Razazan; Ali Budner
- Executive producer: Matt Martin
- Recording studio: San Francisco, California
- Original release: 2001 – present
- Audio format: Stereophonic
- Podcast: Podcast

Your Call is a call-in radio talk show program produced by KALW hosted by Rose Aguilar in San Francisco, California. Your Call features in-depth dialogue and debate on politics, culture, poverty, and the environment. The format of Your Call varies from show to show, but generally involves an in-person interview with one or more subjects, including nationally prominent authors, scholars and grassroots activists. The program airs from 10-11am Pacific Time on weekday mornings.

The show launched the week of September 11, 2001 with Laura Flanders hosting from New York. When Laura started with Air America in 2004, Farai Chideya split hosting duties, before taking over full-time. After Farai left for News & Notes on NPR, Rebecca Roberts, daughter of NPR correspondent Cokie Roberts, hosted along with former CBC host Mary Ambrose. Rose Aguilar and Sandip Roy took over hosting duties after Rebecca was hired by WETA in Washington, D.C. Sandip is no longer with the program, and Rose continues as the main host, with others such as Holly Kiernan coming in on Wednesdays and other days.
