= KDOW =

American radio station in Palo Alto, California

- Palo Alto, California; United States
- Broadcast area: San Francisco Bay Area
- Frequency: 1220 kHz
- Branding: Wall Street Business Network

Programming
- Format: Financial news/talk
- Network: Bloomberg Radio; Salem Radio Network

Ownership
- Owner: Salem Media Group; (SCA-Palo Alto, LLC)
- Sister stations: KDIA, KDYA, KFAX, KTRB

History
- First air date: October 4, 1949; 76 years ago (as KIBE)
- Former call signs: KIBE (1949–1984); KDFC (1984–1997); KBPA (1997–1999); KBZS (1999–2001); KSFB (2001–2004); KNTS (2004–2008)
- Call sign meaning: Reference to the Dow Jones Industrial Average index; station is of no relation to Dow Jones itself

Technical information
- Licensing authority: FCC
- Facility ID: 65485
- Class: D
- Power: 5,000 watts day; 145 watts night
- Transmitter coordinates: 37°29′3.8″N 122°8′7.9″W
- Translator: 95.3 K237GZ (San Francisco)

Links
- Public license information: Public file; LMS
- Webcast: Listen Live
- Website: www.kdow.biz

KDOW (1220 AM) is a commercial radio station broadcasting a financial news/talk format. Licensed to Palo Alto, California, United States, the station serves the greater San Francisco Bay Area. The station is owned by the Salem Media Group (SCA-Palo Alto, LLC).

The station was founded in 1949 with call sign KIBE. Purchased by Sundial Broadcasting in 1953, KIBE began simulcasting the classical music programming of co-owned FM station KDFC-FM; KIBE eventually picked up the KDFC call sign in 1984. The KDFC AM station was sold in 1997 and changed to KBPA. Since then, the station has had a variety of talk formats and call signs. In 1999, KBPA became KBZS and changed to a business talk format for the first time. As KSFB, the station had a Christian talk format from 2001 to 2004. The station then changed to a general news/talk format in 2004 with call sign KNTS. By 2008, KNTS became KDOW and returned to its previous business format.

Outside of a local morning talk show, much of KDOW's programming is nationally syndicated, such as Investor's Edge with Gary Kaltbaum, or brokered programming paid by local businesses. KDOW has broadcast some local college sports, specifically San Jose State Spartans football and Santa Clara Broncos men's basketball.

== History ==
=== As KIBE and KDFC (1949–1997) ===
The station was first licensed on October 4, 1949, as KIBE, owned and operated by Donald K. Deming and Millard Kibbe, founders of the D&K Broadcasting Company. KIBE signed on as a daytime only station operating with 250 watts. Among its early programming was Stanford Roundtable, a talk show featuring students from nearby Stanford University. In September 1950, Deming and Kibbe sold KIBE to J.B. Rhodes, then owner of Associated Grocers, for $45,000. KIBE increased its power to 1 kW in 1952.

In April 1953, Rhodes sold KIBE to Sundial Broadcasting Corporation for $60,000. KIBE began simulcasting Sundial's classical music FM station KDFC in October 1953. KIBE increased its power again in 1965, from 1 kW to 5 kW.

On March 1, 1984, the call signs changed to KDFC. By 1987, KDFC AM began broadcasting at night, with 145 watts of power.

On October 13, 1995, KDFC became an affiliate of Seattle-based KidStar network

=== As KBPA (1997–1999) ===
In the summer of 1997, PAR Holdings bought three stations, including KDFC AM. On August 29, 1997, the station became KBPA and changed its format to a talk radio format with the syndicated Personal Achievement Radio network, which specialized in self-help and inspirational programming. Beginning 1997, KBPA broadcast local women's basketball from Stanford University and the professional team San Jose Lasers. Then in 1998, KBPA added Sports Byline USA to its lineup.

=== As KBZS (1999–2001) ===
On February 15, 1999, the station became KBZS and changed its format to business news and financial advice; its previous personal achievement talk shows moved to evenings. Its studios were in San Francisco at the corner of Sansome Street and The Embarcadero. Morning and afternoon drive hours had local shows, including the two-hour Stock Talk with Rob Black at 5 p.m.; nationally syndicated programs included Ray Lucia's On the Money and The Wade Cook Show.

During the 1999–2000 season, KBZS broadcast San Jose State University men's basketball games. KBZS began broadcasting the Metropolitan Opera in December 1999 after KDFC dropped the show for not being able to carry it on tape delay.

=== As KSFB (2001–2004) ===
In 2001, Salem Communications purchased KBZS for $9 million. KBZS became KSFB on July 24, 2001 and changed from business talk to Christian talk. The previous business talk format moved to KDIA 1640.

Beginning in 2003, KSFB broadcast select San Jose Giants minor league baseball and Santa Clara University men's basketball.

In March 2004, KSFB renewed with the San Jose Giants and changed its nighttime format to sports, beginning with a local sports talk show hosted by Carolyn Burns and the Sporting News Radio network during overnights.

=== As KNTS (2004–2008) ===
On July 1, 2004, the station became KNTS and changed to a news/talk format four days later with much of its weekday schedule consisting of the Salem Radio Network lineup, including The Dennis Prager Show and The Michael Medved Show. With a contract renewal, KNTS was the radio home of San Jose Giants baseball for the third straight year. The Giants won the 2005 California League title.

KNTS made some more sports programming changes later in 2005. In August, KNTS became the flagship station for San Jose State football and basketball; the football games returned to San Jose's KLIV in 2006, but KNTS continued carrying basketball games until the 2007–08 season. By the fall, KNTS dropped Carolyn Burns's sports show.

In November 2005, the FCC granted KNTS a construction permit to increase its power to 50 kW day and night and use a transmitter in Hayward. KNTS became the San Jose affiliate of the Oakland Athletics in February 2006. The A's dropped KNTS after the 2006 season for FM station KIFR.

=== As KDOW (2008–present) ===
On July 1, 2008, 1220 AM picked up its present call letters KDOW, resuming its previous business news and financial advice format. At the request of KDOW's license holder Salem Communications, the FCC cancelled the 2005 construction permit in November 2008, restoring KDOW's operating power to 5 kW day and 145 W night.

In July 2009, the city of Hayward rejected a plan to build four 200-foot radio towers for KDOW near the Hayward Regional Shoreline park. The towers would have allowed KDOW to have a stronger signal for a $5 million one-time fee in addition to an annual $60,000 lease.

Rob Black, who previously hosted Stock Talk on KBZS, returned to the station on October 12, 2010 with a morning drive financial talk show, Rob Black and Your Money. Black previously hosted a show on KNEW.

Beginning in 2013, KDOW began carrying fewer Santa Clara games as KLIV picked up more Santa Clara games. KDOW broadcast only one Santa Clara game in the 2016–17 season. Beginning in 2017, KDOW broadcast the majority of Santa Clara basketball games, with sister station KTRB occasionally carrying others.

On May 15, 2015, KDOW announced that it took over the radio broadcast rights to the San Jose SaberCats of the Arena Football League.

On September 11, 2015, San Jose Sharks minor league affiliate San Jose Barracuda signed a radio deal with KDOW to broadcast their games.

For the first time since 2005, KDOW resumed broadcasting San Jose State football games in 2020. But in 2021, KDOW broadcast only one San Jose State football game, while the rest were on KTRB.

== Programming ==
=== Business talk ===
The station features a variety of news, business, and financial talk shows, including nationally syndicated shows America in the Morning, Investor's Edge with Gary Kaltbaum, and Market Wrap with Moe Ansari. KDOW also has some locally produced shows, including Rob Black and Your Money in morning drive and some brokered time shows hosted by local financial advisors or business consultants.

=== Sports ===
Having broadcast San Jose State University football and basketball games in various stints since 1999, KDOW resumed broadcasting San Jose State football in 2020.

KDOW has broadcast Santa Clara University men's basketball games since 2003.

== Technical information ==
KDOW is owned by Salem Media Group as part of a five-station cluster of in the San Francisco Bay Area with KDIA, KDYA, KFAX, and KTRB. The stations' studios and offices are in Fremont, and its transmitter is in East Palo Alto west of the Dumbarton Bridge. KDOW broadcasts at 5,000 watts during the day and 145 watts at night. KDOW has a 40-watt translator station in San Francisco, K237GZ (95.3 FM), which was licensed on March 17, 2020.
