= 840 AM =

AM radio frequency

The following radio stations broadcast on AM frequency 840 kHz: WHAS in Louisville is the dominant Class A station on 840 AM, which is a United States clear channel frequency.

== In Argentina ==
- General Belgrano in Buenos Aires
- LT12 Gral Madariaga in Paso de los Libres, Corrientes
- LU2 in Bahia Blanca, Buenos Aires
- LV9 in Salta

== In Canada ==
Call sign	City of license	Daytime power (kW)	Nighttime power (kW)	Transmitter coordinates
CFCW	Camrose, Alberta	50	40	52.961111°N 112.96°W
CKBX	100 Mile House, British Columbia	1	0.5	51.6697°N 121.291°W

== In Mexico ==
- XETEY-AM in Tepic, Nayarit
- XEXXX-AM in Tamazula de Gordiano, Jalisco

== In the United States ==
Stations in bold are clear-channel stations.

Call sign	City of license	Facility ID	Class	Daytime power (kW)	Nighttime power (kW)	Unlimited power (kW)	Transmitter coordinates
KDNF	Belen, New Mexico	25528	D	1.8	0.03		35.008611°N 106.714444°W
KKNX	Eugene, Oregon	5390	D	1	0.17		44.081667°N 123.109444°W
KMAX	Colfax, Washington	13569	B	10	0.28		46.913889°N 117.324444°W
KMPH	Modesto, California	137401	B	5	5		37.709444°N 120.726111°W
KPEN	Kenai, Alaska	160571	B	5	1.9		60.303960°N 151.161200°W
KSWB	Seaside, Oregon	43580	B	1	0.5		45.981944°N 123.917222°W
KTIC	West Point, Nebraska	33880	D	5			41.784167°N 96.679444°W
KVJY	Pharr, Texas	64629	B	5	1		26.316667°N 98.104444°W
KWDF	Ball, Louisiana	3641	D	8			31.377778°N 92.474167°W
KXNT	North Las Vegas, Nevada	33068	B	50	25		36.398056°N 114.915833°W
WBHY	Mobile, Alabama	24453	D	10			30.763889°N 88.11°W
WCEO	Columbia, South Carolina	54466	D	50			34.211667°N 80.834722°W
**WHAS**	Louisville, Kentucky	11934	A			50	38.261111°N 85.428611°W
WHGH	Thomasville, Georgia	25773	D	10			30.798333°N 83.939444°W
WKDI	Denton, Maryland	4131	D	1			38.898056°N 75.852778°W
WKTR	Earlysville, Virginia	73191	D	8.2			38.265833°N 78.414722°W
WPCO	Stroudsburg, Pennsylvania	47423	D	0.25			40.973889°N 75.195278°W
WPGS	Mims, Florida	73876	D	1			28.738889°N 80.883889°W
WRYM	New Britain, Connecticut	26314	D	1	0.125		41.686111°N 72.729722°W
WXEW	Yabucoa, Puerto Rico	74206	B	5	1		18.049444°N 65.868611°W
