= Farai Chideya =

American journalist (born 1969)

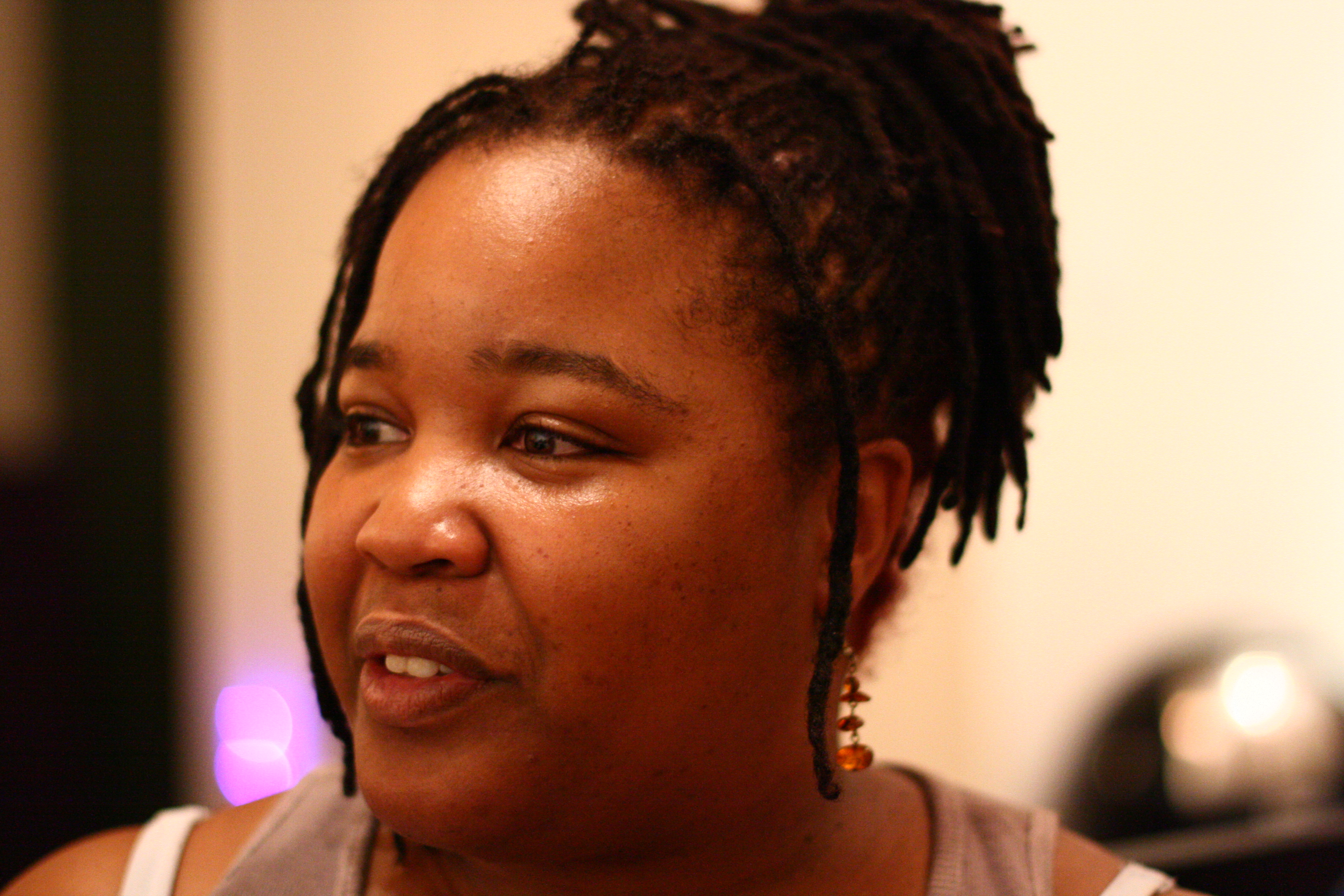
- Born: July 27, 1969 (age 57); Baltimore, Maryland, U.S.
- Education: Harvard University (BA)
- Occupations: Writer, journalist, radio personality, author

Farai Chideya (/fəˈraɪ tʃɪˈdeɪ.ə/; born July 27, 1969, in Baltimore, Maryland, United States) is an American novelist, multimedia journalist, and radio host. She produced and hosted Pop and Politics with Farai Chideya, a series of radio specials on politics for 15 years. She is the creator and host of the podcast Our Body Politic, which launched in September 2020.

Additionally, since 2012 Chideya has held the position of distinguished writer in residence at the Arthur L. Carter Journalism Institute of New York University, where she teaches courses in radio production and media economics.

== Early life ==
Chideya was born on July 27, 1969, in Baltimore, Maryland. Her mother is from Baltimore, and her father is from Zimbabwe.

Chideya holds a Bachelor of Arts degree in English literature from Harvard College. She graduated from Harvard in 1990, magna cum laude.

== Career ==
Chideya was a member of the improv comedy troupe The Immediate Gratification Players. In 2000, she was distinguished as the most honored alumna from Harvard. Her academic life includes being a professional in residence at the Graduate School of Journalism at the University of California at Berkeley and a visiting professor at the Annenberg School of Communication at the University of Southern California, in addition to her current position as distinguished writer in residence at the Arthur L. Carter Journalism Institute at New York University.

Chideya is also the founder and president of one of the earliest pop culture blogs in the US, PopandPolitics.com. During the 15 years of its existence, PopandPolitics.com was a training ground for young arts and culture journalists. In addition to her radio, video and online journalism, Chideya appears as a political analyst on CNN, MSNBC, CNBC, ABC News, Fox News, BET and HBO. She began working as a senior writer for the website FiveThirtyEight in 2015, covering issues including the 2016 presidential election.

In May 2009, Atria Books published Chideya's first novel, Kiss the Sky, which details the life of a black female rock musician making a career comeback in New York. The book takes place just months before 9/11 and is rooted in the ethos of the Black rock movement and the New York club scene. Chideya is also part of The Finish Party writing group, and is the author of three non-fiction books about race and politics: Don't Believe the Hype, The Color of Our Future and Trust: Reaching the 100 Million Missing Voters.

Prior to 2009, Chideya was the host of the National Public Radio radio program News & Notes. Before that, she hosted Your Call, a daily radio call-in show on San Francisco, California's KALW public radio. She got her start in journalism working for Newsweek magazine, MTV News, the Oxygen network and the non-profit community news website, The Beehive. She has subsequently written pieces for The New York Times, the Los Angeles Times Syndicate, the Chicago Tribune Syndicate, The American Prospect, the San Francisco Chronicle, Time, O, The Oprah Magazine, Vibe, Spin and Glamour.

From 2014 to 2015, Chideya produced and hosted One with Farai, a podcast for Public Radio International (PRI), in which she interviewed distinguished individuals with a range of stories and opinions, including Melissa Harris-Perry, Urvashi Vaid, and Alec Ross.

Chideya is the recipient of a Foreign Press Center fellowship that took her to Japan in 2002, a Knight Foundation fellowship based at Stanford University in 2001 and a Freedom Forum Media Studies Center fellowship in 1996.

She has won various awards for her work: a special award from the Lesbian and Gay Journalists Association for AIDS reporting in 2008; an Enterprise reporting award from the National Association of Black Journalists for a piece on Skid Row in 2007; a North Star Award for covering communities of color in 2006; a distinguished honoree award from the Black Entertainment and Telecommunications Association in 2004; a MOBE IT Innovator Award and an Alternet New Media Hero award for PopandPolitics.com in 2001; New York Public Library's Best Books for Teens for The Color of Our Future in 2000; a WIN Young Women of Achievement Award in 1996; a GLAAD Award from Spin in 1995; and a National Education Reporting Award and an EdPress award for education reporting done for Newsweek in 1994.

Her speeches on civic engagement, electoral politics, digital media, hip-hop, race and politics have given her a chance to deliver her message around the world—from India to South Africa to Alaska. Some of her talks have occurred at Syracuse University, the University of Southern California, the California African-American Museum in Los Angeles, M.I.T., the University of Wisconsin at Milwaukee, the University of Chicago, Stanford University, the University of California at Berkeley, Louisiana State University, De Anza Community College, the University of Alaska at Fairbanks, Wellesley College, Chicago State University, Harvard University and Smith College .

Chideya served as a judge for the 2023 American Mosaic Journalism Prize.

== Bibliography ==
- Don't Believe the Hype: Fighting Cultural Misinformation About African Americans (1995)
- The Color of Our Future (1999)
- Trust: Reaching the 100 Million Missing Voters (2004)
- Kiss the Sky (2009)
- Innovating Women: The Changing Face of Technology (2014)
- The Episodic Career: How to Thrive at Work in the Age of Disruption (2016)
