= KZM =

Radio station in California (1921–1931)

KZM was an early radio broadcasting station, initially licensed to Preston D. Allen in Oakland, California. It was issued its first license in December 1921, moved to nearby Hayward in 1928, and was deleted in mid-1931.

== History ==
=== 6XAJ ===
Although KZM was first licensed as a broadcasting station in December 1921, this was actually a relicensing and continuation of operations begun under an experimental license, 6XAJ, (Note: The "6" in 6XAJ's call sign designated that the station was located in the sixth Radio Inspection district, while the leading "X" indicated that it was operating under an Experimental license.) issued to the Preston D. Allen a few months earlier. Allen, described at the time as a "'thoroughbred' radio man in every respects", had extensive radio experience as an amateur operator as well as a radio technician during World War I. He installed 6XAJ atop the Hotel Oakland as an adjunct to his Western Radio Institute, which occupied two rooms on the hotel's seventh floor. Beginning in September 1921 the station transmitted on 325 meters (923 kHz), and its schedule included "Press matter" supplied by the Oakland Tribune, broadcast daily from 7:15-7:30 p.m., plus concerts on Tuesday and Friday evenings from 8:00-9:00 p.m.

=== KZM ===
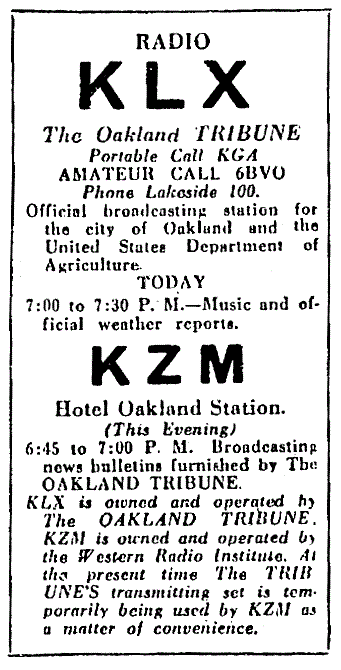
While in Oakland, KZM maintained a close relationship with the Oakland Tribune, including a period in mid-1922 to 1923 when it and the newspaper's KLX shared facilities at the Hotel Oakland.

Beginning in late 1912, radio communication in the United States was regulated by the Department of Commerce. Initially there were no formal standards for which stations could make broadcasts intended for the general public, and after World War I stations under a variety of license classes, most commonly Amateur and Experimental, began making regularly scheduled programs on a limited basis. In order to provide common standards for the service, the Commerce Department issued a regulation effective December 1, 1921, that stated that broadcasting stations would now have to hold a Limited Commercial license that authorized operation on two designated broadcasting wavelengths: 360 meters (833 kHz) for "entertainment", and 485 meters (619 kHz) for "market and weather reports".

On December 9, 1921, a broadcasting station license with the randomly assigned call letters KZM was issued to Preston D. Allen, for operation on 360 meters. KZM and the Atlantic-Pacific Radio Supplies Company station, KZY, authorized the same day, were the first two broadcasting stations licensed to Oakland, California, under the new regulations.

In the summer of 1922, Allen convinced the Tribune that it should get its own radio station license, which was issued on May 3, 1922, with the call letters KLX. For its first year-and-a-half of operation KLX shared the studios and transmitter at the Hotel Oakland with KZM, and engineer Roswell Smith remembered that "they used to shut down the transmitter as KZM, and take to the air a half hour later as KLX". As part of the cooperative effort, the Herald arranged to upgrade the station's 5-watt transmitter by installing two more powerful transmitters which were named for characters in the Toonerville Folks comic strip: 50-watt "Little Jimmie", and 250-watt "Powerful Katrinka".

Initially the 360 meter wavelength was the only "entertainment" frequency available, so stations within various regions had to create timesharing agreements to assign individual operating slots. An August 1922 schedule reported the hours for KZM as 7:15-7:30 p.m. daily, plus 7:30-8:15 p.m. Tuesday and 8:15-9:00 p.m. Friday. By November 1, 1922, there were twelve "San Francisco Bay District" stations sharing time on 360 meters, with KZM, having ceded its original hours to KLX, reduced to just 15 minutes daily, from 6:45-7:00 pm. In the following years KZM was shifted to a number of operating frequencies.

==== Move to Hayward ====
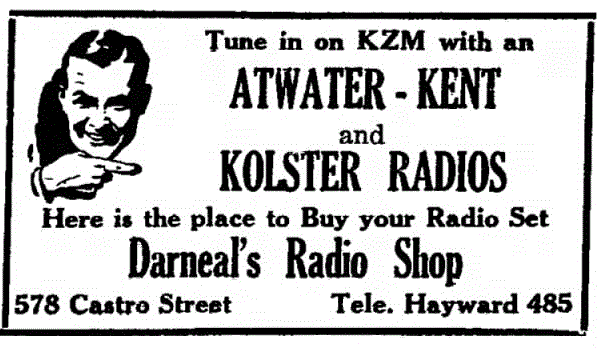
In April 1928 KZM moved from Oakland to Hayward, California.

In late 1923 KLX relocated to new studios located at the newspaper's headquarters. KZM continued to operate from the Hotel Oakland with a limited schedule of short daily news reports until April 1928, when Allen decided to concentrate fully on his job as KLX station manager, and sold the station's equipment to the Oakland School Department, and its license to Leon P. Tenney, a Hayward businessman. Tenney moved KZM to studios in the Palmtag Building at Castro and "B" Streets in Hayward. On April 1, 1928, KZM was assigned to 1300 kHz, sharing the frequency with KRE in Berkeley.

Tenney operated KZM under the corporate name "The Golden West Broadcasting Station". The station was rated at 100 watts, with its timeshare schedule with KRE limiting its regular schedule to four hours per day, divided between 9:15-10:15 a.m., 5:00-6:00 p.m. and 8:00-10:00 p.m. In addition, a six hour long "all night frolic" commenced at 10 p.m. on Saturday nights.

On November 11, 1928, under a sweeping reorganization implemented by the Federal Radio Commission's (FRC) General Order 40, KZM was reassigned to a low-powered "local" frequency, 1370 kHz. Initially it was planned to give it a new timesharing partner, KJBS in San Francisco, however this was changed to instead continue timesharing with KRE on the new frequency.

The FRC was formed with the mandate that it should determine which stations were operating in the "public convenience, interest or necessity". On January 29, 1931, the agency announced that hearings would be held to determine the fate of nine stations, including KZM. This review concluded that KZM should be deleted, on the grounds that the station was found deficient "for technical reasons", and KZM was formally deleted on June 23, 1931.

== See also ==
- List of initial AM-band station grants in the United States
