= Crosscurrents =

Crosscurrents may refer to:

- CrossCurrents, a journal published by the University of North Carolina Press
- Crosscurrents (radio program), a newsmagazine from KALW-FM Public Radio in San Francisco
- Crosscurrents (Bill Evans album), 1977
- Crosscurrents (Lennie Tristano album), 1949 [1972]
- Cross Currents (Richard Souther album), 1989
- Cross Currents (1916 film), a 1916 American silent film
- Cross Currents (1935 film), a 1935 British comedy film
- Cross Currents (Eliane Elias album), 1987

== See also ==
- Crosscurrent (disambiguation)
