= KMPH (AM) =

- Modesto, California; United States
- Broadcast area: Modesto; Manteca; Merced
- Frequency: 840 kHz
- Branding: Relevant Radio

Programming
- Format: Catholic talk and teaching
- Network: Relevant Radio

Ownership
- Owner: Relevant Radio, Inc.

History
- First air date: July 10, 2006; 20 years ago
- Call sign meaning: From former station owners Mike, Pete and Harry Pappas; also used on Fresno sister television station KMPH-TV

Technical information
- Licensing authority: FCC
- Facility ID: 137401
- Class: B
- Power: 5,000 watts
- Transmitter coordinates: 37°42′33.75″N 120°43′37.74″W
- Translator: 97.9 K250BR (Modesto)

Links
- Public license information: Public file; LMS
- Webcast: Listen live
- Website: relevantradio.com

KMPH (840 AM) is a radio station licensed to Modesto, California. It airs a Catholic talk and teaching format and is owned by Relevant Radio, Inc. All programming is provided by the Wisconsin-based Relevant Radio network.

KMPH is a Class B AM station. Its power is 5,000 watts and covers a section of Central California. AM 840 is a clear channel frequency. To protect other stations from interference, KMPH uses a directional antenna with a five-tower array. The towers and transmitter are off Claribel Road in Paulsell, California, about 15 miles (24 km) east of Modesto. Programming is also heard over 250-watt FM translator K250BR on 97.9 MHz.

== History ==
KMPH signed on in July 2006 with an adult standards and middle or the road (MOR) format, along with some talk programming. The station, owned by Pappas Radio of Modesto (a subsidiary of Pappas Telecasting), effectively replaced KTRB (860 AM); KTRB had operated from Modesto since 1933, but had just signed off the previous month in preparation for a move to the San Francisco Bay Area. KMPH switched to an all-talk format on March 10, 2008.

KMPH was on the air for four years but ran into money problems. Pappas shut the station down on August 31, 2010. It later returned to air with brokered programming provided by Paulino Bernal Evangelism of Texas. KMPH returned to a talk format in May 2013 as a simulcast with KOMY (1340 AM) in La Selva Beach, California.

On July 1, 2013, KMPH switched to a 1950s and 1960s "Graffiti Gold" oldies format. It promoted itself as "Modesto's Power House" and drew on Modesto's connection to hometown hero George Lucas's classic 1973 motion picture American Graffiti. The oldies format lasted a year.

On July 30, 2014, Immaculate Heart Radio (IHR)'s Catholic programming began airing on KMPH under a local marketing agreement ahead of a $50,000 purchase from Pappas Radio. IHR's purchase of the station was consummated on October 30, 2014. KMPH flipped to the Relevant Radio network programming when IHR Educational Broadcasting and Starboard Media Foundation consummated their merger on June 30, 2017.

== Translator ==
Call sign	Frequency	City of license	FID	ERP (W)	Class	Transmitter coordinates	FCC info
K250BR	97.9 FM	Modesto, California	143851	250	D	37°38′59.7″N 121°1′27.8″W	LMS
