= KYY =

Radio station in San Francisco, California (1921–1923)

KYY was a short-lived broadcasting station in San Francisco, California, licensed to The Radio Telephone Shop. It was issued its first license in December 1921, and deleted just over a year later.

== History ==
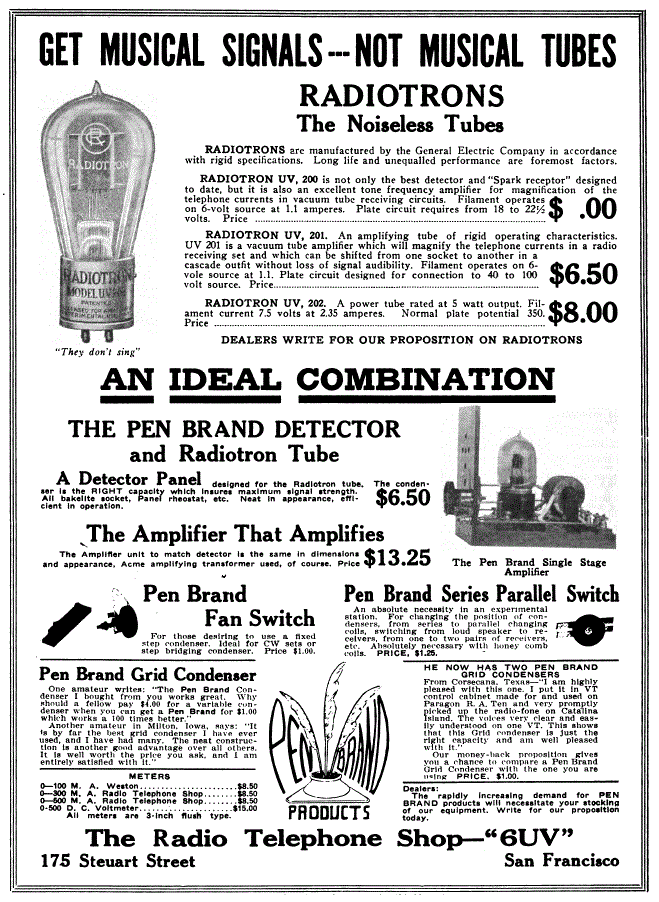
KYY was the successor to The Radio Telephone Company's earlier stations, starting with 6UV in 1920.

=== 6UV/6XAE ===
In early 1920 A. F. Pendleton, owner of The Radio Telephone Shop, held a standard amateur station license, 6UV, (Note: The "6" in 6UV's call sign specified that the station was located in the Sixth Radio Inspection district, while the fact that "U" fell in the range A—W indicated that the station held a standard Amateur license.) which was used to broadcast concerts beginning around March or April 1920. This may have been the first station after World War I to make entertainment broadcasts in the San Francisco Bay Area. (Note: An article in the October 1921 issue of Pacific Radio News stated that "Mr. Pendleton is one of the radio telephone pioneers of the West. His first telephone made its debut on the air about a year and a half ago." The Atlantic-Pacific Radio Supplies Company's 6XC also debuted in early 1920. Charles Herrold made an extensive series of broadcasts beginning in 1912, but had to shut down during World War One, and did not return to the airwaves until 1921.)

The April 1921 issue of Pacific Radio News reported that "The radio telephone station at 175 Steuart St., San Francisco, operated by Mr. A. F. Pendleton of the Radio Telephone Shop, transmits press by voice and CW on Tuesday and Friday evenings from 8 P. M. to 9 P. M. Several musical numbers are also provided on both nights. Signals from Mr. Pendleton's station (6UV) have recently been heard with good audibility in Portland, Oregon". Later that year The Radio Telephone Shop was issued a license for an experimental station, 6XAE. (Note: The "X" in 6XAE's call sign indicated that the station was operating under an Experimental license.) A contemporary review noted that 6XAE was continuing the 8:00-9:00 p.m. Tuesday and Friday programs, transmitted on a wavelength of 425 meters (706 kHz).

=== KYY ===
Beginning in late 1912, radio communication in the United States was regulated by the Department of Commerce. Initially there were no formal standards for which stations could make broadcasts intended for the general public, and after World War I stations under a variety of license classes, most commonly Amateur and Experimental, began making regularly scheduled programs on a limited basis. In order to provide common standards for the service, the Commerce Department issued a regulation effective December 1, 1921, that stated that broadcasting stations would now have to hold a Limited Commercial license that authorized operation on two designated broadcasting wavelengths: 360 meters (833 kHz) for "entertainment", and 485 meters (619 kHz) for "market and weather reports". On December 20, 1921 a broadcasting station license with the randomly assigned call letters KYY was issued to The Radio Telephone Shop, for operation on 360 meters.

In contrast to The Radio Telephone Shop's early prominence in broadcasting, KYY had a minimal history. Initially the 360 meter wavelength was the only "entertainment" frequency available, so stations within various regions had to create timesharing agreements to assign individual operating slots. However, an August 1922 schedule reported no hours at all for KYY. In addition, although there were twelve "San Francisco Bay District" stations sharing time on 360 meters by November 1, 1922, the station was not included in the regional assignments that took effect on that date. KYY was formally deleted on January 24, 1923.

== See also ==
- List of initial AM-band station grants in the United States
