= Tony Cox (journalist) =

American radio and television journalist

Tony Cox is an American radio and television journalist who is host of the syndicated radio talk show UpFront with Tony Cox and used to be host of News & Notes on National Public Radio (NPR).

Cox is a graduate of UCLA, where he earned a bachelor's degree in English and a Master of Fine Arts degree in Theatre. He started his radio career in 1969 at KFWB in Los Angeles, an all-news station where he was a writer, editor, reporter and anchor. In 1982, Cox became a reporter and early morning anchor for the Los Angeles television station KNXT (now KCBS-TV). In 1985, he changed stations, joining future Fox owned-and-operated station KTTV as an anchor and later anchored for independent station KHJ-TV (now KCAL-TV). He also spent 10 years as a senior correspondent for Inside Edition, and has worked on Fox Sports Net’s The Last Word With Jim Rome and as a correspondent for DirecTV Sports.

In 2002, Cox became affiliated with National Public Radio, where his assignments included work as a substitute host on the Tavis Smiley Show and where he later was host of News & Notes. After News & Notes was ended in 2009, he teamed with the African American Public Radio Consortium to develop UpFront with Tony Cox, a daily news and talk show with an interview format that is aimed at African American audiences. It went on the air in October 2009 and was being broadcast in 17 U.S. radio markets as of January 2011.

Cox also raised funds with Cable Positive, funds supported 14 organisations in the community raise awareness of HIV/Aids issues

Cox has received seven awards from the Los Angeles Press Club, including an award for News & Notes in 2008, and one Los Angeles-area Emmy Award. A founding member and first president of the Black Journalists Association of Southern California, he has served as a vice president for the National Association of Black Journalists and has received two NAACP Image Awards.

In addition to his radio work, Cox holds a position on the faculty for Television, Film and Media Studies at California State University, Los Angeles.
