= KVVN =

- Santa Clara, California; United States
- Broadcast area: Santa Clara Valley
- Frequency: 1430 kHz
- Branding: KVVN AM 1430

Programming
- Language: Vietnamese

Ownership
- Owner: Phuong Pham; (Pham Radio Communication LLC)
- Sister stations: KVTO, KLIV

History
- First air date: December 15, 1963
- Former call signs: KGBA (1963–1965); KGNU (1965–1969); KEGL (1969–1976); KNTA (1976–1997)

Technical information
- Licensing authority: FCC
- Facility ID: 28438
- Class: B
- Power: 1,000 watts (day); 2,500 watts (night)
- Transmitter coordinates: 37°19′46.8″N 121°52′1.8″W
- Repeater: 1590 KLIV (San Jose)

Links
- Public license information: Public file; LMS
- Webcast: Listen live
- Website: kvvn.net

KVVN (1430 AM) is a radio station in the United States. Licensed to Santa Clara, California, United States, it serves the San Francisco Bay Area with a Vietnamese language format. The station is currently owned by Phuong Pham through licensee Pham Radio Communication LLC, owners of KVTO. According to Pham, it is the third oldest Vietnamese radio station in the United States.

== History ==
Founded by George B. Bailey and Greater Bay Area Broadcasters, the station obtained its first construction permit on March 8, 1963, and signed on as KGBA on December 15, 1963. KGBA featured programming from the Mutual Broadcasting System and weekly programs in German and Italian.

Following a $182,000 sale of the station to Royal Bear Broadcasters in the previous month, KGBA became KGNU on October 1, 1965. KGNU changed its network affiliation from Mutual to ABC in 1969.

Royal Bear Broadcasters sold KGNU and Stockton station KWG to Barnes Enterprises for $900,000 in June 1969, and KGNU's call sign changed to KEGL on July 1, 1969. KEGL had a full country and western music format until April 1971, when Barnes changed the station schedule to have religious music in mornings and Spanish programming in evenings. In March 1972, Barnes sold KEGL to Cascade Broadcasting for $316,000.

KEGL became KNTA on July 1, 1976. By 1980, KNTA broadcast exclusively in Spanish. In 1986, KNTA began broadcasting Oakland A's games in Spanish.

In February 1997, the Inner City Broadcasting Corporation purchased KNTA from Imperio Enterprises (formerly Cascade Broadcasting) for $2.2 million. After changing from Spanish to an Asian ethnic format, KNTA became KVVN on October 17, 1997.

After Inner City Broadcasting filed for bankruptcy, it sold KVVF and Berkeley station KVTO to YMF Media, a company backed by Magic Johnson and other investors in 2012. YMF Media sold both stations to Pham Radio Communications in 2013.

== Programming ==
The station carries TNT Radio (Vietnamese: Radio Tiếng Nước Tôi) broadcasting all day. TNT began broadcasting a few hours per day on KVVN in November 1999. In May 2000, it partnered with Vietnamese-language stations in San Diego and Sacramento to form a network that later grew to include stations across the United States and Australia. In April 2003, TNT began broadcasting 24 hours a day.

== See also ==
- KAZA (AM)
- KZSJ
