= KWDF =

Coordinates: 31°22′40″N 92°28′27″W

- KWDF 99.7 Logo
- Ball, Louisiana; United States
- Broadcast area: Alexandria, Louisiana
- Frequency: 840 kHz

Programming
- Format: Christian radio

Ownership
- Owner: Wilkins Radio Network, Inc.; (Capital City Radio Corporation)

History
- First air date: 1986

Technical information
- Licensing authority: FCC
- Facility ID: 3641
- Class: D
- Power: 8,000 watts day
- Translator: See below

Links
- Public license information: Public file; LMS
- Webcast: KWDF 840 Listen Live; KWDF 99.7 Listen Live
- Website: KWDF 840 Online; KWDF 99.7 Online

KWDF (840 AM) is a daytime only radio station broadcasting a Christian format. Licensed to Ball, Louisiana, United States, and serving the Alexandria, Louisiana area, the station is owned by Capital City Radio Corporation.

840 AM is a United States clear-channel frequency, on which WHAS in Louisville, Kentucky is the dominant Class A station.

== FM translator ==
The KWDF signal is also relayed to an FM translator which provides nighttime coverage, although the coverage area of the translator is much smaller than KWDF.

Broadcast translator for KWDF
Call sign	Frequency	City of license	FID	ERP (W)	Class	FCC info
K259CX	99.7 FM	Ball, Louisiana	156126	250	D	LMS
