= Crosscurrent =

Crosscurrent may refer to:

- Crosscurrent (Jake Shimabukuro album), 2003
- Crosscurrent (Chase Baird album), 2010
- Crosscurrent (film), a 2016 Chinese drama film

== See also ==
- Crosscurrents (disambiguation)
