= Sound of Hope =

Chinese-language radio network

Sound Of Hope
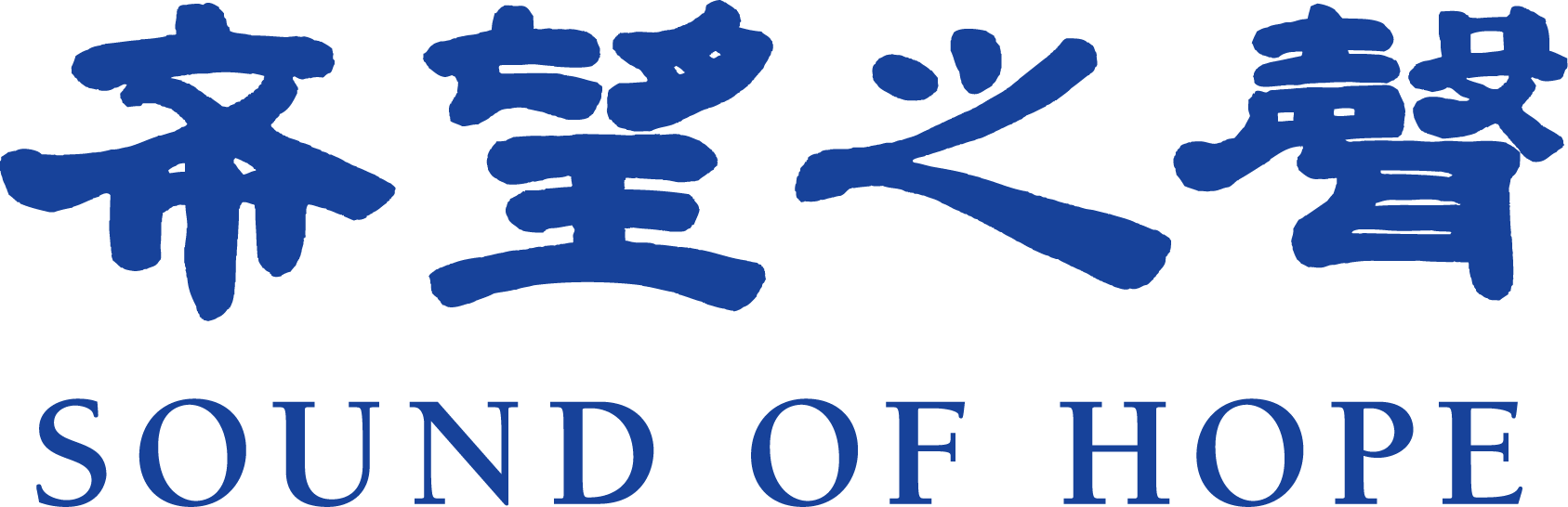
- Country: United States
- Broadcast area: San Francisco Bay Area; Chicago MSA
- Headquarters: San Francisco, California, U.S. Middletown, New York, U.S.

Programming
- Language(s): Cantonese; Mandarin

Ownership
- Owner: Sound Of Hope Radio Network Inc.
- Parent: Falun Gong

History
- Founded: 2001 by Allen Yong Zeng; Sean Lin

Coverage
- Stations: KSQQ-FM 96.1; KQEB-LP 96.9; KVTO-AM 1400; WQEG-LP 98.3

Links
- Website: www.soundofhope.org
Sound of Hope
- Type: Nonprofit
- Tax ID no.: 72-1562499
- Legal status: 501(c)(3) nonprofit organization

Sound of Hope
- Traditional Chinese: 希望之聲
- Simplified Chinese: 希望之声
Transcriptions
Standard Mandarin
- Hanyu Pinyin: Xīwàng Zhīshēng
- Wade–Giles: Hsi-wang Chi-sheng
Yue: Cantonese
- Jyutping: Hei1mong6 Zi1seng1

Sound of Hope (SOH) is an American nonprofit, international Chinese-language radio network. Along with New Tang Dynasty Television and The Epoch Times, it is part of a network of media organizations established by practitioners of the Falun Gong new religious movement. SOH serves the Chinese diaspora in US, Europe, Australia, Japan and South Korea via AM/FM radio and Chinese people in China via shortwave radio.

== Stations and programs ==
SOH was founded in Mountain View, California by Falun Gong follower and former software engineer Allen Zeng in 2001. and was incorporated as a nonprofit organization on May 6, 2003. Zeng founded SOH due to concerns from outsiders producing "distorted stories about the [Falun Gong] movement".

SOH Network radio programs are primarily in Chinese (Mandarin and Cantonese). The US radio also provides network programming to 14 affiliated Chinese-language FM radios. SOH is headquartered in San Francisco, California, and has two main operations. One serves Chinese Americans in the U.S. via AM/FM and the other serves China via shortwave radio.

The US radio started from KSQQ FM 96.1, KVTO AM 1400 during afternoon and evening hours and has grown to be the largest Chinese radio in the region, adding KQEA-LP/KQEB-LP (96.9 FM, two time-shared licenses) as affiliated stations. It provides news and lifestyle talkshows relating to local expatriate Chinese, and covers issues such as elections, local policy debates, California droughts, Cupertino city redevelopment, and the COVID-19 pandemic.

The China radio broadcasts to mainland China through more than 100 shortwave stations. Programs of SOH can also be listened to via online streaming and mobile apps.

SOH also produces YouTube video programs. The YouTube channel “Jiangfeng Time” had more than half a million subscribers as of 2020. SOH teamed with Epoch Times editor John Nania to start the right-wing news website America Daily at americadaily.com.

== Relationship to Falun Gong ==
The Sound of Hope radio network was co-founded by Sean Lin and Allen Zeng. The network united local radio stations that had been founded by Falun Gong practitioners. It is one of a number of media outlets, such as The Epoch Times and NTDTV, started by Falun Gong practitioners who emigrated to the West.

Most of its initial staff were Falun Gong adherents who volunteered their time and services. It was the last of the three media to be established, beginning operations in June 2003, supported by a network of volunteers that continue to maintain the station's programming. In 2005, the San Francisco Chronicle reported that the boards, including Allen Zeng and its reporting staffs of 20, were composed of Falun Gong practitioners.
