= KTRB =

Talk radio station in San Francisco

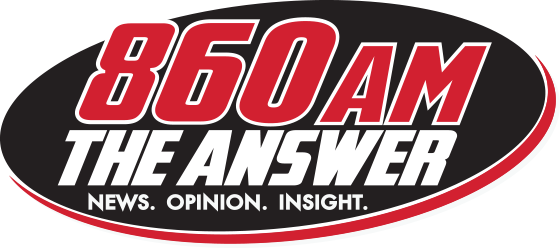
- San Francisco, California; United States
- Broadcast area: San Francisco Bay Area
- Frequency: 860 kHz
- Branding: 860 AM The Answer

Programming
- Format: Conservative talk
- Network: Townhall News
- Affiliations: Salem Radio Network, San Jose State Spartans

Ownership
- Owner: Salem Media Group; (New Inspiration Broadcasting Company, Inc.)
- Sister stations: KDIA, KDOW, KDYA, KFAX

History
- First air date: June 18, 1933 (Note: The station was located in Modesto, California, until February 1, 2007, when it began broadcasting to San Francisco.)
- Call sign meaning: Founding owners T. R. McTammany and Bill Bates

Technical information
- Licensing authority: FCC
- Facility ID: 66246
- Class: B
- Power: 50,000 watts
- Transmitter coordinates: 37°37′57″N 122°7′47″W (day); 37°35′34″N 121°46′27″W (night)

Links
- Public license information: Public file; LMS
- Webcast: Listen Live
- Website: 860amtheanswer.com

KTRB (860 AM) is a commercial radio station in San Francisco, California. The station has a talk radio format, airing programming from the Salem Radio Network, using the slogan "860 AM The Answer." KTRB is owned by Salem Media Group, through licensee New Inspiration Broadcasting Company, Inc.; Salem uses "The Answer" as a brand for most of its talk stations.

The station features nationally syndicated programming, including Salem hosts Hugh Hewitt, Mike Gallagher, Dennis Prager, and Sebastian Gorka.

== History ==
KTRB signed on the air on June 18, 1933, licensed to Modesto, California. Its owner, Pappas Telecasting, obtained permission from the Federal Communications Commission (FCC) to move the station to the larger, more lucrative San Francisco media market. To replace the loss of the station in Modesto, Pappas Telecasting established KMPH on 840 AM in Modesto. In order to serve the Bay Area with a usable signal, but protect other stations on the frequency, a new transmitter site was constructed in Sunol, California which pointed its signal west over the Bay Area. This site is situated directly south of Livermore. During transmission testing in the Bay Area, KTRB began airing a classic rock music format on February 1, 2007.

=== As a hot talk station ===
The San Francisco Chronicle reported that KTRB would debut a hot talk format on March 15, 2007, featuring syndicated personalities Mancow Muller and John London, who once aired on San Francisco stations, as well as other syndicated hosts such as Glenn Beck. A similar article appeared a few days later in the San Jose Mercury News. On January 25, 2010, the station announced that conservative talker Michael Savage would take over the afternoon slot, four months after being let go by KNEW (910 AM). That April, a replay of Savage's show also began airing in morning drive time, owing to his live show being frequently preempted due to live coverage of Athletics games.

=== As a sports talk station ===
In the fall of 2008, KTRB switched to a sports radio format. It became the flagship station of Stanford University football and men's basketball. It also became the flagship of the Oakland Athletics baseball team.

=== Receivership by Comerica Bank ===
KMPH was shut down on August 31, 2010 due to lack of revenue. On September 10, 2010, KTRB was taken over by Comerica Bank through the receivership of Susan L. Uecker. The station dismissed its entire staff except for the chief engineer and ceased to carry Michael Savage, but continued its sports format using syndicated shows. Athletics baseball broadcasts, including pregame and postgame shows, were taken over by the team itself. After the Athletics' attempt to purchase the station collapsed, the broadcasts were moved to KBWF 95.7 FM, (now KGMZ-FM) for the 2011 season with the Bay Bridge Series exhibition games airing on KFRC (1550 AM, now KZDG).

With no capital available to repair the failed former directional day/night transmitter site, a new transmitter site was needed. Comerica Bank petitioned several times for FCC permission to operate the station non-directionally during all hours, with 50,000 watts days, and with 12,500 watts nights, subject to objections from co-channel stations. Under the terms of the special temporary authority or "STA", KTRB is required to reduce night power further, in order to mitigate interference.

There are few stations in the San Francisco area whose existing towers have the requisite geometry for operation on 860 kHz at the licensed 50,000–watt level. However, non-directional operation at KFAX's site with 50,000 watts days was successfully implemented, and it has been granted an FCC construction permit for 5,000 watts nights using all four of KFAX's towers.

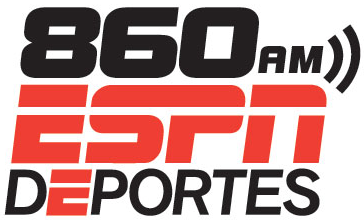
KTRB's logo as an ESPN Deportes Radio affiliate

On Friday, June 24, 2011, Deportes Media began operating KTRB under a local marketing agreement (LMA). The station's format changed to Spanish-language sports using the ESPN Deportes Radio Network.

Beginning in 2014, KTRB became the San Francisco affiliate for the San Jose State Spartans football radio network.

=== Switch to Salem Radio Network ===
On the Fourth of July weekend, 2016, the station switched to a conservative talk radio format airing nationally syndicated programs from the Salem Radio Network. The station began operations under the Salem Media Group using an LMA. The sports format, including ESPN Deportes and San Jose State football, moved to KKSF. The station is presently operating with 50,000 watts non-directionally days and 5,000 watts non-directionally nights, both from Salem's KFAX transmitter site.

The acquisition of KTRB by the managing partners of Salem, DBA East Bay Broadcasting, LLC for $5,125,000, from the receiver of KTRB, was granted on November 30, 2016.

The FCC construction permit which would turn KTRB from a 50,000–watt four–tower DA-1 installation into a 50,000–watt/5,000–watt DA-2 installation, with one KFAX tower days and all four KFAX towers nights has been granted.

In theory, this should be sufficient for service to the city of license, but the night pattern necessarily protects Portland (Class B, as is KTRB), Tijuana (also Class B) and Toronto (Class A), and, consequently, night service along radials towards those three cities, which includes the largest North Bay and South Bay cities, and some East Bay cities, will be significantly to dramatically reduced.

Effective September 11, 2018, East Bay Broadcasting assigned KTRB's license to Salem Media's New Inspiration Broadcasting Company, Inc., at the same $5.125 million price originally paid by East Bay.

In January 2019, the Oakland Athletics announced KTRB as their flagship station for the 2019 season. After one season, the team elected to not renew with KTRB instead to move game broadcasts to its own "A’s Cast" Internet radio station on TuneIn for the 2020 season. Also in 2020, KTRB resumed broadcasting San Jose State football, splitting the broadcast rights with sister station KDOW. On December 19, 2020, KTRB broadcast San Jose State's 34–20 2020 Mountain West Conference Football Championship Game victory over Boise State. In 2021, KTRB broadcast all but one San Jose State football game.
