= News & Notes =

Radio program

News & Notes was a National Public Radio (NPR) program focusing on issues affecting African Americans and African diaspora communities. The listenership was multiracial and international. The program aired for one hour each weekday and was hosted by Ed Gordon from 2005 to 2006, by Farai Chideya until January 16, 2009, and then by Tony Cox until its final broadcast on March 20, 2009. Chideya is known for her television commentary and books on race. While at News and Notes, she and the teams she worked with won awards from the National Association of Black Journalists and the National Lesbian and Gay Journalists Association, among others.

Highlights of the show included the News & Notes Roundtable, where notable black journalists, bloggers, business leaders, politicians, activists and personalities debated the issues of the day. The program was produced at the NPR West studios in Culver City, California.

The show was awarded a $3 million grant from the Ford Foundation in 2006.

On December 10, 2008, NPR announced that the show would be canceled due to budget constraints. It signed off on March 20, 2009.
