= KDYA =

Radio station in Vallejo, California

Coordinates: 38°08′2.7″N 122°25′35.9″W

- Vallejo, California; United States
- Broadcast area: San Francisco Bay Area; Sacramento metropolitan area
- Frequency: 1190 kHz
- Branding: Gospel 1190 The Light

Programming
- Format: Urban gospel

Ownership
- Owner: Salem Media Group; (New Inspiration Broadcasting Company, Inc.)
- Sister stations: KDIA, KDOW, KFAX, KTRB

History
- First air date: August 1, 1947
- Former call signs: KGYW (1947–1958); KNBA (1958–1993); KXBT (1993–1998)
- Call sign meaning: Variation of KDIA

Technical information
- Licensing authority: FCC
- Facility ID: 54263
- Class: D
- Power: 3,000 watts day

Links
- Public license information: Public file; LMS
- Webcast: Listen Live
- Website: Gospel1190.com

KDYA (1190 kHz), "Gospel 1190 The Light", is a commercial AM radio station owned by Salem Media Group and licensed to Vallejo, California, serving the San Francisco Bay Area. It broadcasts an urban gospel radio format, and is Northern California's only full-time urban gospel station reaching San Francisco, Sacramento, Santa Rosa and Stockton.

The studios and offices are in suburban Fremont. KDYA is a daytimer, transmitting 3,000 watts, using a directional antenna. As 1190 AM is a clear channel frequency reserved for Class A KEX in Portland, Oregon, and XEWK-AM in Guadalajara, KDYA must sign off at sunset to avoid interference with these stations. The transmitter site is on Noble Road in Vallejo, on San Pablo Bay.

== History ==
The station originally signed on in 1947, as KGYW.

Later, as KNBA -- "Kovers North Bay Area" — the station presented a "middle of the road" (MOR) format. With studios and transmitter on Sonoma Boulevard in Vallejo, the station was long owned by Louis J. Ripa until his death February 20, 1992. The KNBA call sign was in use from August 22, 1958, until December 27, 1993, when the call letters changed to KXBT.

=== Expanded Band assignment ===
In 1979, a World Administrative Radio Conference (WARC-79) adopted "Radio Regulation No. 480", which stated that "In Region 2, the use of the band 1605-1705 kHz by stations of the broadcasting service shall be subject to a plan to be established by a regional administrative radio conference..." As a consequence, on June 8, 1988, an ITU-sponsored conference held at Rio de Janeiro, Brazil adopted provisions, effective July 1, 1990, to extend the upper end of the Region 2 AM broadcast band, by adding ten frequencies which spanned from 1610 kHz to 1700 kHz.

While the Federal Communications Commission (FCC) was still making U.S. preparations to populate the additional frequencies, known as the "Expanded Band", John R. Quinn, president of station WJDM in Elizabeth City, New Jersey, arranged to have a provision added to the Communications Act of 1934 in late 1991, mandating: "It shall be the policy of the Federal Communications Commission, in any case in which the licensee of an existing AM daytime-only station located in a community with a population of more than 100,000 persons that lacks a local full-time aural station licensed to that community and that is located within a Class I station primary service area notifies the Commission that such licensee seeks to provide full-time service".

Although this addition was designed to aid WJDM's efforts to receive a fulltime authorization, KXBT also qualified to take advantage of this provision, as it was limited to daytime-only operation, and required to sign-off at night, because it was located within protected nighttime coverage area of a Class I "clear channel" station, KEX in Portland, Oregon, and there were no unused fulltime assignments available on the AM and FM bands in the congested Bay region. Thus, on March 19, 1996, KXBT was authorized to also broadcast, on 1640 kHz, as the second U.S. station, following WJDM, authorized to operate on an expanded band frequency.

On March 22, 1996, the FCC issued an updated list of expanded band allotments, which now assigned KXBT to 1630 kHz, so transmissions were switched to that frequency. On March 17, 1997, the FCC released a revised roster of eighty-eight expanded band assignments, with KXBT designated to move back to 1640 kHz. The expanded band operation, also in Vallejo, was now treated as being a separate station with its own unique call sign, and a construction permit for it was assigned the call letters KDIA on April 17, 1998.

=== Later history ===
The FCC's initial policy was that both the original station and its expanded band counterpart could operate simultaneously for up to five years, after which owners would have to turn in one of the two licenses, depending on whether they preferred the new assignment or elected to remain on the original frequency. However, this deadline has been extended multiple times, and both stations have remained authorized, with the station on 1640 kHz adopting a Christian talk and teaching format. One restriction is that the FCC has generally required paired original and expanded band stations to remain under common ownership.

KXBT's call sign was changed to KDYA on June 1, 1998. The station carried Spanish language broadcasts of Oakland Athletics baseball in the daytime, while KDIA would broadcast night games from 2009 to the middle of the 2010 season.

Effective June 1, 2021, Baybridge Communications sold KDYA and sister station KDIA to Salem Media Group for $600,000.
