= KVJY =

Radio station in Pharr, Texas

Coordinates: 26°19′00″N 98°06′16″W

- Pharr, Texas; United States
- Broadcast area: Rio Grande Valley
- Frequency: 840 kHz
- Branding: Radio Aleluya 840 AM

Programming
- Format: Spanish Christian

Ownership
- Owner: Daij Media, LLC

Technical information
- Licensing authority: FCC
- Facility ID: 64629
- Class: B
- Power: 5,000 watts day 1,000 watts night
- Translators: K243BO (96.5 MHz, Roma)

Links
- Public license information: Public file; LMS
- Website: www.radioaleluya.org

KVJY (840 AM) is a radio station licensed to Pharr, Texas. The station airs a Spanish Christian format.

In May 2017, Bi-Media, composed of members of the Bichara family which also owns radio holdings in Mexico, sold KVJY to Daij Media. Daij is owned by the Villarreal family and primarily operates Radio Aleluya religious stations. The sale, at a price of $910,000, was consummated on July 18, 2017.
