= Crosscurrents (radio program) =

- Genre: Radio news magazine Podcast
- Running time: 30 min
- Country of origin: United States
- Language: English
- Home station: KALW
- Hosted by: Hana Baba
- Recording studio: San Francisco, California
- Original release: 4 August 2008 – present
- Audio format: Stereophonic
- Website: http://kalw.org/programs/crosscurrents

Crosscurrents is a half-hour evening news magazine from KALW Public Radio in San Francisco. The show launched on August 4, 2008 and is hosted by Hana Baba. The show's tagline is "Context, culture and connection from around the Bay Area."

Crosscurrents airs Monday through Thursday from 5 to 5:30 p.m. on 91.7 FM in the San Francisco Bay Area and streams live. The show is also available as a podcast.

Members of the Crosscurrents team have been honored by the Society of Professional Journalists Northern California Chapter, San Francisco Peninsula Press Club, Public Radio News Directors Inc. and the Radio Television Digital News Association.

Crosscurrents is funded through a combination of grants and listener contributions to KALW.

== Show contents ==
Crosscurrents shows combine coverage of key local news stories with sound-rich features highlighting the arts and culture of the Bay Area.
