= KDIA =

- Vallejo, California; United States
- Broadcast area: San Francisco Bay Area
- Frequency: 1640 kHz
- Branding: 'AM 1640 The Word

Programming
- Format: Christian talk and teaching

Ownership
- Owner: Salem Media Group; (New Inspiration Broadcasting Company, Inc.)
- Sister stations: KDOW, KDYA, KFAX, KTRB

History
- First air date: March 19, 1996; 30 years ago
- Former call signs: KXBT (1996-1998)
- Former frequencies: 1630 kHz (1996-1997)
- Call sign meaning: named after the original KDIA, which was a sister station to WDIA

Technical information
- Licensing authority: FCC
- Facility ID: 87108
- Class: B
- Power: 10,000 watts
- Transmitter coordinates: 37°53′43.7″N 122°19′30.9″W (day); 38°8′2.7″N 122°25′35.9″W (night)

Links
- Public license information: Public file; LMS
- Webcast: Listen Live
- Website: kdia.com

KDIA (1640 kHz) is a commercial AM radio station licensed to Vallejo, California, and serving the San Francisco Bay Area. It is owned by the Salem Media Group and broadcasts a Christian talk and teaching radio format. Salem also owns KFAX, which airs a separate schedule of Christian programming. The radio studios and offices are on Liberty Street in Fremont.

KDIA transmits 10,000 watts. By day, it is non-directional, using one of the KKSF towers in Richmond on San Francisco Bay. At night, it is directional, using a four-tower array on Noble Road in Vallejo.

== History ==
KDIA originated as the expanded band "twin" of a station on 1190 kHz.

In 1979, a World Administrative Radio Conference (WARC-79) adopted "Radio Regulation No. 480", which stated that "In Region 2, the use of the band 1605-1705 kHz by stations of the broadcasting service shall be subject to a plan to be established by a regional administrative radio conference..." As a consequence, on June 8, 1988, an ITU-sponsored conference held at Rio de Janeiro, Brazil adopted provisions, effective July 1, 1990, to extend the upper end of the Region 2 AM broadcast band, by adding ten frequencies which spanned from 1610 kHz to 1700 kHz.

While the Federal Communications Commission (FCC) was still making U.S. preparations to populate the additional frequencies, known as the "Expanded Band", John R. Quinn, president of station WJDM in Elizabeth City, New Jersey, arranged to have a provision added to the Communications Act of 1934 in late 1991, mandating: "It shall be the policy of the Federal Communications Commission, in any case in which the licensee of an existing AM daytime-only station located in a community with a population of more than 100,000 persons that lacks a local full-time aural station licensed to that community and that is located within a Class I station primary service area notifies the Commission that such licensee seeks to provide full-time service".

Although this addition was designed to aid WJDM's efforts to receive a fulltime authorization, KXBT on 1190 in Vallejo also qualified to take advantage of this provision, as it was limited to daytime-only operation, and required to sign-off at night, because it was located within protected nighttime coverage area of a Class I "clear channel" station, KEX in Portland, Oregon, and there were no unused fulltime assignments available on the AM and FM bands in the congested Bay region. On March 19, 1996, it was authorized to also broadcast, on 1640 kHz, as the second U.S. station, following WJDM, authorized to operate on an expanded band frequency.

On March 22, 1996, the FCC issued an updated list of expanded band allotments, which now assigned KXBT to 1630 kHz, so transmissions were switched to that frequency. On March 17, 1997, the FCC released a final revised roster of eighty-eight expanded band assignments, with KXBT designated to move back to 1640 kHz. The expanded band operation was now treated as being a separate station with its own unique call sign, and a construction permit for it was assigned the call letters KDIA on April 17, 1998.

The FCC's initial policy was that both the original station and its expanded band counterpart could operate simultaneously for up to five years, after which owners would have to turn in one of the two licenses, depending on whether they preferred the new assignment or elected to remain on the original frequency. However, this deadline has been extended multiple times, and both stations have remained authorized. One restriction is that the FCC has generally required paired original and expanded band stations to remain under common ownership.

The station was put on the air by KUIC chief engineer Alan McCarthy. The original transmitter was a used Continental 316 Doherty layout converted by contract engineer Skipp May. The original antenna system was a diplex layout with KXBT. The antenna system was designed by Rich Green and installed by Ralph Jones (and Skipp May). The problematic 316 transmitter was upgraded to a BE sometime circa 1996. Alan McCarthy left "Quick Broadcasting" for a position at KFBK in Sacramento. McCarthy died from a heart attack.

KDIA has been a Christian talk station since 2002. It has since gone through two upgrades and now covers the San Francisco Bay Area, day and night. In 2009, it became the flagship station for Spanish language night time broadcasts of Oakland Athletics baseball until the middle of the 2010 season, while sibling station KDYA broadcast daytime games.

Effective June 1, 2021, Baybridge Communications sold KDIA and sister station KDYA to Salem Media Group for $600,000.

== History of the original KDIA ==
The KDIA call sign had an earlier history, as late as 1997, in the San Francisco Bay area. It was previously assigned to a station at 1310 AM, that began broadcasting in 1922 as KLS, and which in 1945 changed its call letters to KWBR and changed its format to focus on an African-American audience. In 1959, it was bought by the owners of Memphis radio station WDIA, and the call letters were changed to KDIA. During the 1960s through the 1980s, the station was the premier soul and funk station in the San Francisco Bay Area. The station helped launch the careers of such musicians as Sly and the Family Stone. Its tagline at that time was "KDIA, Lucky 13."

For four months in 1984-85 the station was owned by Adam Clayton Powell III, during which time it carried the call letters KFYI and broadcast an all-news format. In the early 1990s KDIA was co-owned by then mayor of Oakland, California, Elihu Harris with then California State Assembly Speaker Willie Brown. In 1992, Oakland journalist Chauncey Bailey returned to the Bay Area to work as public affairs director and newscaster on KDIA. Bailey later became the editor of the Oakland Post and was murdered on the streets of downtown Oakland.
