= WHGH =

- Thomasville, Georgia; United States
- Broadcast area: Tallahassee, Florida
- Frequency: 840 kHz
- Branding: Hot 840 Jams

Programming
- Format: Urban Contemporary

Ownership
- Owner: Moses L. Gross; (HGH Investments Corp.)

History
- First air date: 1980
- Former call signs: DWHGH (2012–2013)
- Call sign meaning: HGH Investments Corp.

Technical information
- Licensing authority: FCC
- Facility ID: 25773
- Class: D
- Power: 10,000 watts day
- Transmitter coordinates: 30°47′54.7″N 83°56′21.6″W

Links
- Public license information: Public file; LMS

WHGH (AM 840) is a radio station broadcasting an Urban Contemporary format., and licensed for Thomasville, Georgia, United States, in the Tallahassee, Florida area. The station is owned by Moses L. Gross, a black Thomas County Commissioner, through his HGH Investments Corporation.

The station's license was cancelled and its callsign deleted from the Federal Communications Commission's database on April 6, 2012, for failure to renew. The licensee submitted a petition for waiver and reinstatement, claiming that "the loss of WHGH was represents a severe blow to the people it serves" and "The Commission should not let a rigid adherence to its rules result in the loss of yet another minority-owned voice in our Nation's media landscape." The FCC granted a waiver in June 2013, restoring the callsign and accepting a late renewal application, and granting special temporary authority to resume operations pending renewal.
