= KSTN (AM) =

- Stockton, California; United States
- Frequency: 1420 kHz
- Branding: 105.9 The Bull

Programming
- Format: Country

Ownership
- Owner: Robert LaRue; (KSTN, LLC)

History
- First air date: November 27, 1949
- Call sign meaning: Stockton

Technical information
- Licensing authority: FCC
- Facility ID: 58838
- Class: B
- Power: 5,000 watts (day); 3,500 watts (night)
- Transmitter coordinates: 37°55′31.7″N 121°14′47.8″W
- Translators: 92.3 K222DE (Linden); 105.9 K290AG (Stockton)

Links
- Public license information: Public file; LMS
- Webcast: Listen Live
- Website: 1059thebull.com

KSTN (1420 AM, "105.9 The Bull") is a commercial radio station licensed to Stockton, California, United States. Owned by Robert LaRue, and licensed by KSTN, LLC, it airs a country music format. KSTN's studios and transmitter are sited off of Ralph Avenue in Stockton. Programming is also heard on low-power FM translator K290AG at 105.9 MHz.

== History ==
On November 27, 1949, at 6 AM, KSTN signed on the air. KSTN's first General Manager was Dave Greene and the original power was 1,000 watts. It was owned by Knox LaRue until his death on December 22, 2004. An FM station, originally 107.3 KSTN-FM (now KLVS) went on the air in 1962.

The LaRue Family planned to sell KSTN-AM-FM to Independence Media Holdings of Dallas, Texas, for $24,250,000 in 2008. Due to the bad economy, the deal fell through.

At its inception, KSTN's programming was Big Band/Swing, with some Country western Music in the afternoons with Dusty Duncan as the host. Other early KSTN on-air personalities included Bud Hobbs, Bill Elliott and Paula Stone.

The station switched to a Top 40 format in 1957. In 1962, station owner Knox LaRue contracted with noted Top 40 radio programmer Bill Drake to program KSTN. Upon leaving San Francisco's KYA in 1962, Bill Drake was hired to split time as program director of both KYNO in Fresno, and KSTN in Stockton, California.

KSTN owner Knox LaRue (December 18, 1922 – December 22, 2004) was a business partner with KYNO owner Gene Chenault in various ventures. They co-hired Drake upon the recommendation of Jane Swain, LaRue's general manager at KSTN, who had worked with Drake at WAKE in Atlanta. While the classic KMAK–KYNO battle of Fresno has been well documented, KSTN and LaRue are certainly owed their debt as well.

A pioneer of the Top 40 genre, LaRue built KSTN in 1949, and began playing the popular music of the day. As the rock era began, KSTN just stayed with it, providing a training ground for numerous talents. Among the audio exhibits on the ReelRadio.com site are the original deejay jingles from Drake's tenure at KSTN. These rare artifacts from his Stockton days are precursors to the Johnny Mann acapellas and Bill Drake-voiced jock intros and station IDs of the "Boss Radio" era. Other elements of the famed Drake format were also initiated and honed during his stint at KSTN in the early 1960s.

KSTN hired John Hampton for weekends on September 24, 1980, the airshift previously held by Jay Richard (aka Tom Richard). John was promoted to full-time in 1981 and was made program director in September 1981. In 1981, KSTN switched from Rhythmic Top 40 to Pop Top 40. In 1984, KSTN switched back to Rhythmic Top 40. In the late 1980s and the 1990s, while many other radio stations on the AM dial changed to news/talk formats, KSTN continued its music broadcasts. In 1995, John Hampton was moved to mornings.

In 1999, KSTN changed its format to a Variety Hits Oldies format it called "Power Oldies 1420." KSTN played may types of music including Doo Wop Oldies of the '50s, Top 40 of the '60s and '70s, '70s Disco, Classic rock of the '70s and '80s, punk, Alternative Music of the '80s and '90s and an occasional touch of Country. In 2005, KSTN fine-tuned its format to Classic Hits, which is a format more common for the FM dial; KSTN no longer branded itself as "Power Oldies 1420." KSTN also added local sports play-by-play to its schedule, including Oakland A's baseball, Stockton Ports baseball, Stockton Thunder ECHL hockey, and University of the Pacific Tigers athletics.

On February 13, 2006, KSTN replaced John Hampton's Morning Show with the syndicated "Mancow's Morning Madhouse" from Chicago via satellite. This marked the first time KSTN had placed a syndicated show in its daily lineup.

On February 19, 2010, after over 60 years on the air, KSTN went silent. The station played "Another One Bites the Dust" by Queen followed by the theme from WKRP in Cincinnati before signing off the air for the final time at 6:15 pm.

As of January 2012, the station is on the air again with a syndicated country format.

On February 13, 2013, KSTN changed their format to classic country.

After a weekend of stunting, on March 17, 2014, KSTN changed their format to country, branded as "105.9 The Bull" (the frequency in the branding is for FM translator K290AG 105.9 FM Stockton).
