= WPGS =

- Mims, Florida; United States
- Broadcast area: Space Coast
- Frequency: 840 kHz
- Branding: Local 840

Programming
- Format: Silent

Ownership
- Owner: WPGS, Inc.

History
- First air date: September 18, 1984 (as WNUY)
- Former call signs: WNUY (1984–1986); WPGS (1986–2009); WGRU (2009–2011)

Technical information
- Licensing authority: FCC
- Facility ID: 73876
- Class: D
- Power: 1,000 watts day
- Transmitter coordinates: 28°44′21″N 80°53′1.2″W

Links
- Public license information: Public file; LMS
- Webcast: Listen live
- Website: www.local840.com

WPGS (840 AM) was a commercial radio station licensed to Mims, Florida, serving the Space Coast including parts of Brevard County and Volusia County. The station is currently silent.

WPGS is licensed as a daytimer. During daylight hours, it transmitted with a power of 1,000 watts, non-directional. Because 840 AM is a United States clear-channel frequency, on which WHAS in Louisville, Kentucky, is the dominant Class A station, WPGS must sign off between sunset and sunrise to avoid interference with the nighttime skywave signal of WHAS.

== Programming ==
WPGS primarily advertises itself as a classic rock station with some talk radio programming including a local show hosted by "Pastor Marty" (who also hosts music-based airshifts as "Marty B") and reruns of Paul Harvey's The Rest of the Story. Nights and Sundays are devoted to specialty oldies and doo-wop programming.

== History ==
The station signed on the air on September 18, 1984, as WNUY. On May 1, 1986, the station changed its call sign to WPGS.

In 1998, the station served as a critical news center for residents during the fires which claimed many homes and lives nearby. Normally, a daytime-only station, WPGS stayed on throughout the danger with the owner at one point climbing the tower to see how close the fires were getting to the community.

In October 2009, WPGS dropped the Talkstar radio network to become part of the smooth jazz "Groove Network".

WPGS went silent on April 7, 2026 and its broadcast tower was dismantled. The station has continued to operate as an Internet radio station.
