= KJLV (FM) =

Coordinates: 37.205°N 121.950°W

- Los Gatos, California; United States
- Broadcast area: San Jose - Santa Clara Valley
- Frequency: 95.3 MHz (HD Radio)

Programming
- Format: Contemporary Christian music
- Subchannels: HD2: K-Love 90s HD3: K-Love 2000s

Ownership
- Owner: Educational Media Foundation
- Sister stations: KWAI, KLVS, KMVS

History
- First air date: 1966 (as KLGS)
- Former call signs: KLGS (1964–1969); KTAO (1969–1974); KRVE (1974–1985); KATD (1985–1989); KYAY (1989–1990); KRTY (1990–2022); KLRK (2022–2023)
- Call sign meaning: "K-Love"

Technical information
- Licensing authority: FCC
- Facility ID: 35569
- Class: A
- ERP: 870 watts
- HAAT: 262 meters (860 ft)

Links
- Public license information: Public file; LMS
- Webcast: Listen Live; Listen Live (HD2); Listen Live (HD3)
- Website: klove.com

KJLV (95.3 FM) is a radio station in Los Gatos, California, United States, serving the San Jose and Santa Clara Valley area. It is owned by the Educational Media Foundation (EMF) and part of its K-Love network. The primary transmitter is on Blackberry Hill Road in Los Gatos. KJLV also has two booster stations on 95.3 MHz: KJLV-FM1 serving Scotts Valley and KJLV-FM2 at New Almaden.

What is today KJLV began broadcasting in 1966 as KLGS. From 1990 to 2022, it aired a country music format under the KRTY call sign. Despite good ratings performance, it was sold as part of the dissolution of deceased owner Bob Kieve's estate to EMF. An internet station, KRTY.com, continues the country format.

== History ==
=== KLGS (1964–1969) ===
After obtaining a construction permit in 1964, KLGS went full-power on 95.3 MHz in September 1966, owned by the Western Stereo Company.

Tomentose Broadcasting bought KLGS in October 1968 for $133,500 and obtained the broadcast license in February 1969 for an additional $127,500.

=== KTAO (1969–1974) ===
KTAO was an FM station in Los Gatos, owned by former Random House editor, Bill Ryan, and Lorenzo Milam. From March 1969 to June 1974, 95.3 had a freeform format. Programming on KTAO included 48 hours of Indian music on Christmas Eve and Day of 1970 and Angela Davis announcing station identifications with calls to release the Soledad Brothers from prison.

=== KRVE (1974–1985) ===
Joseph Vieira and two partners bought KTAO in 1974 and changed the station to a Portuguese format with call sign KRVE.

=== KATD (1985–1989) ===
The 95.3 frequency took on the call sign KATD on September 9, 1985. It aired a Top 40 format and DJs broadcast from a studio on North Santa Cruz Avenue in Los Gatos where passers-by could make song requests by holding up signs to the window. The station immediately faced competition against KWSS.

=== KYAY and KRTY (1989–2022) ===
On November 28, 1989, KATD became KYAY and changed its format from rock to country. KYAY changed to the KRTY call sign on January 10, 1990, but retained the country format.

In October 1992, Bob Kieve's Empire Broadcasting purchased KRTY for more than $3 million from Randolph E. George. By the latter half of the decade, as the Telecommunications Act of 1996 led to the consolidation of radio station ownership around the United States and in the Bay Area, the Empire Broadcasting family of stations including KRTY were among the last locally owned stations in the Bay Area.

KRTY attracted a front page San Jose Mercury News story for banning the Dixie Chicks song "Goodbye Earl" due to violent lyrics and hosting an on-air, call-in program on March 13, 2000, about the song. The station's editorial decision also got attention in the Los Angeles Times and USA Today. KRTY later added the song to its playlist and donated to a domestic violence shelter for every play of the song.

Beginning in the 2016–17 season, KRTY became the South Bay affiliate for the Golden State Warriors radio network, after the team moved from the powerful signal of KNBR that covered the entire San Francisco Bay Area.

Bob Kieve died on May 25, 2020; longtime midday host Randy Jones died unexpectedly on December 1, 2021.

=== Sale to EMF ===
On March 23, 2022, Empire Broadcasting announced that it would sell KRTY to the Educational Media Foundation, operators of nationally syndicated Christian music networks Air1 and K-Love, for $3.138 million. The sale would result in the end of KRTY's country music format; Empire Broadcasting would retain the KRTY call sign. The future of the country music radio format in the Bay Area was uncertain until KBAY and KKDV flipped to country on April 5.

On June 3, it was announced that KRTY would leave the air on June 17, coincident with the consummation of the sale. However, the country format remained, complete with the still-retained airstaff, as an internet-only station. On June 22, 2022, the station changed call signs to KLRK in a swap with the K-Love transmitter at Great Bend, Kansas.

Due to a glitch in Nielsen Audio's reporting system, KRTY's Web stream was inadvertently included along with KLRK's ratings in the station's first ratings report in July 2022. When Nielsen corrected the error to only show KLRK's listenership, it indirectly revealed that KRTY's Web stream had retained half of the listening audience it had during its last days on FM, and that the Web stream had an audience four times higher than K-Love had drawn on KLRK.

The station changed its call sign to KJLV on August 8, 2023.
