= KFAX =

Coordinates: 37°37′56″N 122°07′49″W

- San Francisco, California; United States
- Broadcast area: San Francisco Bay Area
- Frequency: 1100 kHz
- Branding: AM 1100 K-F-A-X

Programming
- Format: Christian talk and teaching
- Affiliations: Salem Radio Network

Ownership
- Owner: Salem Media Group; (New Inspiration Broadcasting Company, Inc.)
- Sister stations: KDIA, KDOW, KDYA, KTRB

History
- First air date: January 3, 1925
- Former call signs: KFUQ (1925); KJBS (1925–1960)
- Call sign meaning: Adopted in 1960 when station had all-news format

Technical information
- Licensing authority: FCC
- Facility ID: 24510
- Class: B
- Power: 50,000 watts

Links
- Public license information: Public file; LMS
- Webcast: Listen Live
- Website: kfax.com

KFAX (1100 AM) is a commercial radio station licensed to San Francisco, California, and heard around the Bay Area. Since 1984, the station has been owned by Salem Media Group and programs a Christian radio teaching and talk format.

The studios and offices are in suburban Fremont and the transmitter is in nearby Hayward, near the San Mateo–Hayward Bridge. KFAX broadcasts with 50,000 watts, the highest power permitted for AM stations, but because 1100 AM is a clear-channel frequency reserved for Class A WTAM in Cleveland, KFAX must use a directional antenna to avoid interference, aiming most of its signal away from the east. The station is the most powerful Christian-formatted AM station west of the Mississippi.

== History ==
=== As KJBS ===
The station now assigned the KFAX call letters was first licensed in 1925 as KFUQ, and made its first broadcast on January 3, 1925. Its five-watt radio transmitter provided an advertising gimmick for Julius Brunton & Sons, operators of an automobile service station and local distributor of Willard Storage Batteries, which were popularly used in both experimental transmitters and receivers during radio's early days. Shortly after making its debut, KFUQ became KJBS.

The station's first address was 1380 Bush Street, a building which remains an auto-service facility today. In its early years, the station broadcast police dispatch calls, among its regular schedule, in the days before police departments could afford their own radio transmitters.

In 1927, KJBS's power was increased to 50 watts and, on March 1, 1928, to 100 watts. On April 5, 1929, the station's frequency was changed to 1070 kHz. On April 19, 1930, KJBS debuted its Owl program, signing on at midnight. In the mid-1930s, its power was increased to 500 watts.

In the 1940s, in order to increase its range of coverage, KJBS was assigned to 1100 kHz, sharing time with the dominant station in North America on 1100 kHz, which was in Cleveland. This required that KJBS go off the air at local sunset, but allowed it to come back on the air when Cleveland signed off at 1:00 a.m. in the East, 10:00 p.m. local time. By this time, KJBS had moved to 1470 Pine Street, a building incorporating a stand-alone vertical transmitting tower at the front entrance to the building.

In 1959, KJBS was granted a construction permit to increase its daytime power to 50,000 watts. This change in broadcasting power required the station to operate one of the most distinctive schedules in the history of broadcasting. It operated from a directional set of four towers in the suburban town of Hayward from 6:00 a.m until local sunset, then from the Pine Street 1,000 watt transmitter from 10:00 p.m. until 3:00 a.m. (when Cleveland's WTAM would come back on the air, at 6:00 a.m. Eastern time). During the summer, this meant that KFAX was off the air for only 1.5 hours (8:30 sunset until 10:00 p.m.).

=== As KFAX ===
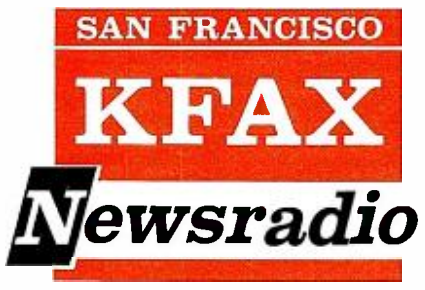
Logo as an all-news station

In 1960, KJBS was sold to Argonaut Broadcasting for $425,000. On May 16, 1960, its call sign was changed to KFAX, and it changed formats from music, news and sports to become the first all-news radio station in the US. This format drew listeners but was unprofitable and it was changed the following year. KFAX later adopted a religious format, with Christian music and religious talk.

In 1977, KFAX began operating with 50,000 watts full-time, using a directional array.

In 1984, KFAX was sold to Salem Media Group, an operator of both religious and secular talk stations. KFAX runs programs such as Dr. Charles Stanley, Jay Sekulow and "Life! Line" with Craig Roberts (the Bay Area's longest running conservative talk show).

== Trivia ==
In light of a radio often being the first electrical device in a home not connected to centrally generated electric power, both the Cleveland-based Willard Storage Battery Company and a local outlet for Willard Batteries founded and owned stations in the early 1920s, as with WTAM in Cleveland (9 months' ownership) and KJBS (apparently for several decades). In this case, however, these two stations with an early link began in 1941 sharing clear channel use of the 1100 kHz frequency.
