= Sing Tao Chinese Radio =

Chinese-language radio station in the San Francisco Bay Area

Sing Tao Chinese Radio 星島中文電台
- Type: Private
- Industry: Radio
- Founded: April 8, 1996
- Headquarters: South San Francisco, CA, USA
- Area served: San Francisco Bay Area
- Parent: Sing Tao News Corporation
- Website: chineseradio.com

Sing Tao Chinese Radio is the radio division of the Sing Tao News Corporation in the San Francisco Bay Area. It currently leases time from KVTO (1400 AM) and KSQQ (96.1 FM).

== History ==
Sing Tao Chinese Radio began broadcasting in Cantonese on KEST (1450 AM) on April 8, 1996, and on KVTO on June 2, 1997. As of 2016, KVTO carries Sing Tao's programs on weekdays from 7 am to 2 pm and from 4 pm to 7 pm, and 12 noon to 2pm Saturday and Sunday.

Mandarin broadcasts began on March 3, 1997. As of 2016, KSQQ carries Sing Tao's programs on weekdays from 7 am to 1 pm to the Mandarin-speaking population which is concentrated in the South Bay area.

Singtao Chinese Radio began to cease Cantonese broadcasts from KEST 1450 AM in July 2005 and it currently has only one Cantonese broadcasting station on KVTO 1400 AM.

== Location ==
Broadcast studios are located in the Sing Tao Daily newspaper building in South San Francisco.
