= Gary Kaltbaum =

- Occupations: Investment Advisor; Author; Radio Personality

Gary Kaltbaum is an American investment advisor and author based in Orlando, Florida and Scottsdale, Arizona. He has a syndicated radio show, Investor's Edge and is a frequent financial commentator on Fox News, particularly on Neil Cavuto's Your World with Neil Cavuto. He has written a book, The Investor's Edge, and is currently working on a new title, No Help From Wall Street.

== Investment Approach ==
A self-styled "student" of the market, one of Gary's central tenets is that the stock market acts independently of outside influence or opinion, and in particular will not be swayed by actions of government. He often refers to this as the market "speaking" and that successful traders will "listen to the market" when considering what positions to take in it. Gary is known for his forceful (and purposefully repetitious) manner, characterized by a heavy Northeastern accent. Gary is an outspoken opponent of the buy and hold school of investing, instead insisting that losses greater than 8% should never be tolerated. He strongly believes that market turns, both negative and positive, have definitive signs that can be identified and exploited. He frequently cites Stan Weinstein and William O'Neil as influential to his points of view.

Gary also pointedly denounces what he refers to as "financial charlatans," leading among them (but by no means alone) Jim Cramer, who he faults for being inappropriately bearish and wrongly calling the bottom of the market during much of 2007 and 2008. He is loath to give very specific advice himself but seems to adhere to a momentum strategy, not based on any kind of hard research on the scientific fundamentals of the companies involved.

== Radio Program ==
Gary's radio show Investor's Edge is featured in multiple markets including Orlando, Florida on WBZW, and Phoenix, Arizona on KFNN scattered with audio samples (a sample from Animal House, "zero point zero" is often used when the market underperforms on the day) that provide a humorous tone to the program. The show is not strictly limited to financial discourse. He frequently weighs in with his opinions on politics, especially with regard to how decisions made by politicians will affect the economy. Another favorite subject is sports. He is a fan of baseball, football and basketball, often talking about his favorite teams, the Mets, Giants and Knicks (while occasionally tipping his hat to his adopted hometown teams in Orlando, Florida, and in Phoenix, Arizona, as well as how he is currently performing in various fantasy leagues.
