= Brokered programming =

Model where a show's producer pays a broadcaster for air time

Brokered programming (also known as time-buy and in Philippine English as blocktime) is a form of broadcast content in which the show's producer pays a radio or television station for air time, rather than exchanging programming for pay or the opportunity to play spot commercials. A brokered program is typically not capable of garnering enough support from advertisements to pay for itself, and may be controversial, esoteric or an advertisement in itself.

== Overview ==
=== Common examples ===
Common examples are religious and political programs and talk-show-format programs similar to infomercials on television. Others are hobby programs or vanity programs paid for by the host and/or their supporters, and may be intended to promote the host's personality, for instance in preparation for a political campaign, or to promote a product, service or business that the host is closely associated with. A live vanity show may be carried on several stations by remote broadcast or simulcast, with the producer paying multiple stations an airtime fee. Financial advisors and planners often produce this kind of programming.

Brokered commercial programs promote products or services by scripting shows made to sound similar to talk radio or news programming, and may even include calls from actual listeners (or actors playing the part of listeners). The programs are a specific type of infomercial, as they focus on a topic related to the product and repeatedly steer listeners and "callers" to a particular website and/or toll-free telephone number in order to purchase the product being featured. Although presented in the style of live programs, these are typically pre-recorded and supplied to stations on tape, disc, or digital downloadable formats, such as MP3 files.

Such programming is most common on talk radio stations and used to fill non-prime time slots and to augment income from spot-advertisement sales during normal programs.

Most of these programs feature a disclaimer at either the beginning or the end of the program (or both), usually read by the program's host or (most often) by a separate announcer; some radio stations play a standard disclaimer before all such programs.

Certain mainstream sports and entertainment broadcasts may resort to buying brokered airtime to air on television if they cannot secure a deal that pays rights fees or a barter agreement. Examples include the last years of the Professional Bowlers Tour, Major League Baseball's short-lived The Baseball Network venture in the mid-1990s, professional football leagues such as the 2009–2012 United Football League and Alliance of American Football, and motorsports events produced and sponsored by Lucas Oil. In the case of professional football, brokered programming has typically not been feasible in the long term, as the sport requires rights fees to make it viable; leagues that have relied on brokering television time have collapsed in short order due to financial losses. Regional sports networks also pad their non-play-by-play schedule with brokered shows catering to niches like high school sports, poker, and all-terrain vehicles. Some packages of high school football and basketball games are brokered more with the specific purposes of college recruiting and future name, image, and likeness deals in mind rather than the actual team matchup, which is mainly prevalent with nationally-ranked high school athletic powers that do not play traditional local schedules against local opponents and highlight certain heavily-recruited players.

=== Radio ===
==== Talk radio ====
Although some syndicators of multi-topic, ad-supported talk shows may pay a fee to stations with very large Arbitron-verified listenership, the same syndicator will normally charge a fee to small stations and may charge nothing to stations with moderate listenership. Each arrangement depends on whether the station can deliver enough listeners to allow the syndicator to earn money from ad sales. Syndicated programs normally carry a number of their own advertisements that must be played during commercial breaks, but set aside time for local stations to play their own advertisements.

Stations also frequently employ one or more of their own hosts, but at some small stations these hosts may be unpaid volunteers motivated by the chance to promote an agenda, gain personal exposure or get work experience.

The use of brokered programming varies by station -- some stations, mainly news radio and sports radio stations, use brokered programming to fill holes in some dayparts, especially during the late-night hours and weekends. The format of brokered programs varies; many sports radio stations will use brokered programs from sports handicappers and prognosticators to fit their format, while news and talk radio stations will often rely on brokered programs that sell vitamin or nutritional supplements, financial planning products and services, and alternative medical products, fitting those stations' older audiences.

Sometimes, even programs dealing with gardening and home improvement (usually presented on weekend mornings on many talk radio stations) are broadcast under a brokered arrangement, as was the case with KRLD gardening expert Neil Sperry before his show was canceled outright in 2010.

Program time is often brokered to churches on Sunday mornings in a manner that parallels televangelism; there are also religious stations that rely primarily on brokered programs, and these stations often get the derisive title of "pay for pray," a play on the unethical practice of "pay for play" on music stations. There are also some AM radio stations that are dedicated to the brokered format, selling time for as little as 15 minutes or even selling the entire broadcasting day to a single entity, with the station holding the broadcast license and providing the facilities. That long-form type of brokered programming is especially popular among ethnic and religious broadcasters as well as with privately owned U.S.-based shortwave radio broadcasters.

==== Music radio programs ====
Brokered programs are not exclusive to talk radio; music radio programs can also be brokered. The brokered format, popular among specialty and niche music formats (e.g. polka music), usually involves the show itself lining up its own advertising and paying the station for its airtime. The idea reduces the risk for the station and assures the show remains on the air as long as the show's producers continue to pay the station's airtime fee.

=== Record companies ===
Record companies (through independent promoters) may also purchase brokered time on music stations to have the station play a new single as a "preview", which has the potential to be inserted onto a station's general playlist but has not received the traction to do so. These spots are often the length of the song with an introduction and disclaimer at the end of the song stating the artist, album title, and releasing label, and come under titles such as CD Preview. The segments must be carefully disclaimed by the record companies so as to not violate payola laws and the playing of the song, as it is paid for, cannot be applied to song popularity charts, as has happened in the early 2000s with some forms of this concept.

=== Brokered time through agencies ===
Oftentimes broadcasters will seek the help of an ad agency to secure a brokered radio show. Agencies such as I Buy Time in Dallas, Texas or Bayliss Media Group in Los Angeles, California have the knowledge on how to negotiate a lower per-hour rate than what may be quoted by the radio station to the individual broadcaster.

=== Local marketing agreements ===
If a station sells all of its time to a programmer, essentially leasing the station, it is a local marketing agreement (LMA). Like owning a station, this counts toward United States Federal Communications Commission (FCC) and Canadian Radio-television and Telecommunications Commission (CRTC) caps that prevent excessive concentration of media ownership in the United States and Canada. However, in the case of television stations, LMA's do not count towards caps in the United States.

== Examples of brokered, non-religious programming ==
Financial planning/advice/services

- Investors Edge with Gary Kaltbaum
- The Mutual Fund Show
- The Ray Lucia Show

Comedy/Variety

- Eat Bulaga! (TV5 and RPTV/RPN)
- It's Showtime (A2Z, All TV and GMA Network)
- Goin' Bulilit (A2Z and All TV)
- ASAP (A2Z, All TV and TV5)
- Comics Unleashed (CBS)

Animation

- Upin & Ipin (TV2, Astro Ceria and Astro Prima)

Infomercial

- The Kevin Trudeau Show

Music

- Ernest Tubb's Midnite Jamboree

Sports

- Calling All Sports With Roc and Manuch

News and Talk

- NewsWatch Plus (via RPTV/RPN and Aliw Channel 23)
- Radio Sputnik (via RM Broadcasting)
- TV Patrol (A2Z, All TV, DZMM Radyo Patrol 630 and PRTV Prime Media)
- Magandang Buhay (A2Z and All TV)

== See also ==
- Talk radio
- Infomercial
- Leased access (for cable television)
- Advertising
- Local marketing agreement
