= KLVS =

K-Love radio station in Livermore, California

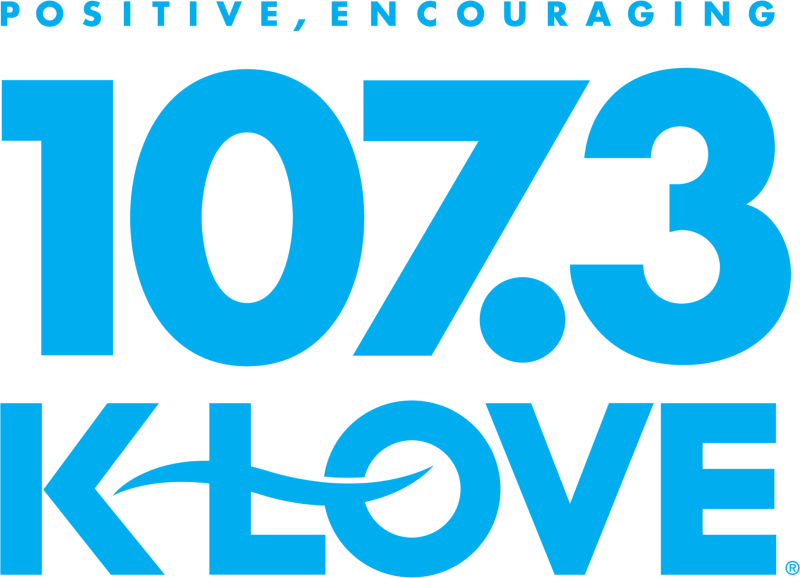
- Livermore, California; United States
- Broadcast area: San Francisco Bay Area
- Frequency: 107.3 MHz (HD Radio)

Programming
- Format: Contemporary Christian
- Subchannels: HD2: Air1; HD3: K-Love 90s
- Network: K-Love

Ownership
- Owner: Educational Media Foundation; (K-Love, Inc.)
- Sister stations: KWAI, KMVS

History
- First air date: 1962
- Former call signs: KSTN-FM (1962–2010)
- Call sign meaning: "K-Love San Francisco"

Technical information
- Licensing authority: FCC
- Facility ID: 69685
- Class: B
- ERP: 4,100 watts
- HAAT: 481 meters (1,578 ft)
- Transmitter coordinates: 37°48′57″N 122°03′41″W
- Translators: 88.9 K205BM (Oakland); 91.9 K220JB (Vacaville); 103.1 K276EK (Vacaville); 104.1 K281BU (San Francisco); HD2: 103.3 K277CH (San Francisco)

Links
- Public license information: Public file; LMS
- Webcast: Listen live
- Website: klove.com

KLVS (107.3 FM) is a radio station broadcasting a Christian Contemporary format from K-Love, licensed to Livermore, California, United States. The station is owned by the Educational Media Foundation.

== History ==
The station signed on the air in 1962 as KSTN-FM Stockton, carrying a full-time classical music format. The following year, it added some Regional Mexican Music and by 1965, it dropped classical music entirely and expanded the Spanish programming with some simulcast of the Top 40 music of KSTN (1420 AM). KSTN-FM transmitted monaural audio from its inception in 1962 until 1996 when it switched to stereo.

Just after 12:01AM on February 20, 2010, the 'La Poderosa' Regional Mexican era ended as KSTN-FM abruptly went dark. Two days later the station returned with an English-language contemporary Christian music format distributed via satellite from K-LOVE. The station call letters changed in March 2010 to KLVS and transmitter license was reassigned in August 2012 to Livermore, within reach of both the Central Valley and San Francisco Bay Area.
