= KALW =

Public radio station in San Francisco

- San Francisco, California; United States
- Broadcast area: San Francisco Bay Area
- Frequency: 91.7 MHz (HD Radio)

Programming
- Format: Public radio
- Affiliations: National Public Radio; Public Radio Exchange; American Public Media; BBC World Service

Ownership
- Owner: San Francisco Unified School District

History
- First air date: March 10, 1941

Technical information
- Licensing authority: FCC
- Facility ID: 58830
- Class: B1
- ERP: 1,900 watts
- HAAT: 280 meters (920 ft)
- Transmitter coordinates: 37.754639°N 122.446639°W

Links
- Public license information: Public file; LMS
- Webcast: Listen live; AAC
- Website: www.kalw.org

KALW Public Media (91.7 MHz) is a non-commercial FM public radio station and independent non-profit serving the San Francisco Bay Area. KALW operates as a community public station, incorporating volunteers in its news, music programs and live events. The station's programming is also streamed on its website.

KALW is a Class B1 FM station and one of the oldest educational FM stations in the U.S. It has an effective radiated power (ERP) of 1,900 watts. The transmitter and tower are on Twin Peaks.

== Programming ==
Old logo

KALW is an independently-operated National Public Radio (NPR) member station, carrying content from NPR, American Public Media, Public Radio International and the BBC World Service. KALW also produces its own local news, music and interview shows, including the live weekday call-in program Your Call, the morning news magazine Crosscurrents, the Sights + Sounds Show, and music programming.

On weekdays, KALW carries popular NPR news shows Morning Edition, All Things Considered and Fresh Air. Evenings and weekends, one-hour weekly public radio specialty shows include Splendid Table, Hidden Brain, The New Yorker Radio Hour, Le Show, This American Life, To the Best of Our Knowledge, Reveal, Big Picture Science, Science Friday, Radio Lab, Snap Judgment, It's Been A Minute, Living on Earth, Hearts of Space and Wait, Wait, Don't Tell Me.

As a part of its affiliation with the San Francisco Unified School District, KALW carries broadcasts of its monthly board meetings. There are also daily listings of school lunch menus, which are occasionally read by celebrities who come to the station for interview shows.

KALW launched its live programming series at their studio events space at 220 Montgomery, San Francisco in 2021. KALW Events feature interactive events including town hall conversations with local leaders, concerts and performances, film screenings, and panel discussions.

== History ==
=== Early FM development ===
In the late 1930s, San Francisco was a major center for radio development in the Western United States. In 1939, General Electric established a powerful shortwave radio station in conjunction with the opening of the Golden Gate International Exposition on San Francisco Bay at Treasure Island, San Francisco. In August 1940, the Radio Corporation of America (RCA) gave a demonstration of the then new technology of frequency modulation (FM) broadcasting at the National Association of Broadcasters convention being held in the city.

In May 1940, the Federal Communications Commission (FCC) announced that effective January 1, 1941, it was establishing a broadcast band for FM stations, operating on 40 channels spanning 42–50 MHz, with the first five channels reserved for educational stations. That same month the San Francisco Unified School District filed an application to construct a new educational FM station, operating on 42.1 MHz with 1,000 watts. The original station application, filed May 24, 1940, specified use of General Electric transmitters, but this was changed in January 1941 to specify an RCA FM-1-B transmitter.

=== Construction ===
KALW was constructed at Samuel Gompers Trades School and began test transmissions on March 10, 1941. It became the first FM station to operate on the West Coast. It was also the second U.S. educational station to begin broadcasting on the FM band. The station entered general service providing instructional programming on September 1.

In 1945 the FCC announced that, due to interference concerns, it was reallocating the FM "low band" frequencies to other services and existing FM band stations would be relocated to 88–106 MHz. (The current FM band later expanded to 108 MHz.) In July 1946, the FCC directed that FM stations currently operating on 42–44 MHz would have to move to new frequencies by the end of the year. KALW changed its frequency from 42.1 to 44.3 MHz as an interim step. The station's initial assignment on the new FM band was 91.3 MHz, and a subsequent reallocation in the fall of 1947 reassigned it to its current frequency of 91.7 MHz.

=== KALW's programs and services ===
KALW was instrumental in helping KQED television to sign on the air in 1954 as one of the first non-commercial educational television stations in the country, by providing technical training, studio space, and engineering advice to the KQED founding staff.

KALW provided Chinese-language simulcasts of KGO-TV newscasts in the 1970s, before local Asian language newscasts became established. During the 1970s and 1980s KALW also aired live coverage of SFUSD sporting events, the last such regular live coverage of high school sports in San Francisco broadcasting.

While KALW's original transmitter had not been used since the switch to the modern FM band in the late 1940s, it was still located at John O'Connell Technical High School until the school was demolished in the mid-1990s.

In late October 2006, KALW suffered an antenna malfunction. The station continued to transmit with only three percent of normal power. This caused some listeners to think the station had ceased broadcasting, although the audio stream was still available via the website. Fellow public broadcaster KQED-FM allowed KALW the use of that station's backup transmitter on San Bruno Mountain during the repair process. On November 2, 2006, station general manager Matt Martin posted an update on the station's website explaining the problem and expressing his appreciation to KQED-FM for its technical assistance.

The City of San Francisco recognized "KALW Day" on the station's 70th anniversary on September 8, 2011. Ten years later, on the station's 80th birthday, San Francisco Mayor London Breed declared September 1 to be "KALW Day".

=== License renewal challenge ===
In 1997, a group of disgruntled KALW employees filed a petition with the FCC to deny renewal of KALW's broadcast license, alleging that station management had covered up violations of hiring rules and had lied about required record keeping. The case was inactive for several years and, according to KALW's website, the group that filed the petition, known as Golden Gate Public Radio, was defunct.

In July 2004, the FCC resurrected the case. While it issued a warning to KALW about its employment practices, the commission determined that there was sufficient evidence supporting misrepresentation of allegations to warrant formal hearings. The hearings concluded in June 2005, and FCC Chief Administrative Law Judge Richard Sippel ruled in April 2006 to grant a limited two-year license renewal for KALW, while reducing a fine for public file violations from $300,000 to $10,000.

In its defense to the FCC, KALW management showed evidence of its meritorious service to the community. The school district also argued for a hardship case, saying it was incapable of paying the $10,000 fine, citing recent budget cuts in its local school programs for children as an example. The judge disagreed, however, and the SFUSD was given two years to pay the fine.

== See also ==
- Campus radio
- List of community radio stations in the United States
- List of radio stations in the San Francisco Bay Area
