= KVTO =

Chinese-language radio station in Berkeley, California

- Berkeley, California; United States
- Broadcast area: San Francisco Bay Area
- Frequency: 1400 kHz

Programming
- Language: Chinese
- Affiliations: Sing Tao Chinese Radio; Bay Area Metro Radio; Bay Area Chinese Radio; Global Chinese Radio; Sound of Hope

Ownership
- Owner: Phuong Pham; (Pham Radio Communication LLC)
- Sister stations: KLIV, KVVN

History
- First air date: 1922
- Former call signs: KRE (1922–1963, 1972–1986); KPAT (1963–1972); KBLX (1986–1989, 1990–1994); KBFN (1989–1990)
- Call sign meaning: "Voice of the Orient"

Technical information
- Licensing authority: FCC
- Facility ID: 28681
- Class: C
- Power: 1,000 watts (unlimited)
- Transmitter coordinates: 37°50′57.7″N 122°17′47.9″W
- Translator: 93.7 K229DD (San Francisco)

Links
- Public license information: Public file; LMS
- Webcast: Listen live
- Website: kvto.net

KVTO (1400 AM) is a radio station broadcasting a Chinese format. Licensed to Berkeley, California, United States, the station serves the San Francisco Bay Area. The station is currently owned by Phuong Pham, through licensee Pham Radio Communication LLC. Its tower is located in Berkeley, California, and is shared with KEAR. It is an affiliate of Cantonese-language Sing Tao Chinese Radio.

== History ==
The station began in Berkeley in 1922 as KRE, the former callsign of a marine radio station aboard a World War I merchant marine steamship, Florence H., destroyed in an April 17, 1918 explosion at Quiberon Bay, France. The Maxwell Electric Company put KRE on the air on March 11, 1922, with studios and transmitter at the Claremont Resort Hotel. In May of that year, KRE was sold to the Berkeley Daily Gazette; the station was sold again in January 1927, this time to the First Congregational Church of Berkeley, which moved the studios and built a new transmitter. In January 1930, the Chapel of the Chimes (an Oakland funeral home) bought KRE; ownership passed in December 1936 to Central California Broadcasters, a wholly owned subsidiary of the Chapel of the Chimes. New studios and a transmitter were built in 1937-38 at the foot of Ashby Avenue (601 Ashby) adjacent to Berkeley's Aquatic Park.

KRE-FM went on the air on February 14, 1949, with a transmitter on Round Top, a peak in the hills above Berkeley and Oakland in Contra Costa County. In 1950 the transmitter was moved to the site of KRE (AM) in Berkeley.

In March 1963, KRE was taken over by the Wright Broadcasting Company of Paterson, New Jersey. The new principal owner, Dickens J. Wright, had previously been the principal owner of WPAT in Paterson, and on April 14, 1963 KRE's call letters were changed to KPAT. Later programming was simulcast on KRE-FM and there were occasional AM/FM stereo broadcasts, including some classical music programming. The call sign was changed back to KRE in 1972. The call letters KBLX were adopted in 1986, then changed to KBFN in 1989 and back to KBLX in 1990. The current call letters, KVTO, were adopted in 1994; the 1400 AM frequency was a simulcast of KBLX-FM 102.9, which was a sister station of KVTO until May 1, 2012, when Entercom Communications officially took over KBLX.

In the summer of 1972, George Lucas filmed radio legend Wolfman Jack at the KRE studios for the film, American Graffiti. (Some artistic license was employed for the movie: the Wolfman is shown doing his program live from California, although the Brinkley Act made such broadcasting illegal.)

== See also ==
- List of initial AM-band station grants in the United States
