= KWAI (FM) =

Air1 radio station in Los Altos, California, United States

- Los Altos, California; United States
- Broadcast area: San Francisco Bay Area; San Jose, California
- Frequency: 97.7 MHz (HD Radio)
- Branding: Air1

Programming
- Format: Contemporary worship music
- Subchannels: HD2: Spanish contemporary worship music "Air1"; HD3: Radio Nueva Vida

Ownership
- Owner: Educational Media Foundation
- Sister stations: KJLV, KLVS, KMVS

History
- First air date: October 1, 1960 (as KPGM)
- Former call signs: KPGM (1960–1969); KPEN (1969–1984); KLZE (1984–1988); KHQT (1988–1995); KFFG (1995–2019); KJLV (2019–2023)
- Call sign meaning: AIr1

Technical information
- Licensing authority: FCC
- Facility ID: 58843
- Class: A
- ERP: 6,000 watts
- HAAT: 125 meters (410 ft)
- Transmitter coordinates: 37.307°N 122.096°W
- Translators: 100.9 K265CV (Fremont); 104.1 K281BL (Coyote); HD2: 88.9 K205BN (Los Gatos); HD3: 91.9 K220BV (San Jose)

Links
- Public license information: Public file; LMS
- Webcast: Listen Live
- Website: air1.com nuevavida.com (HD3)

KWAI (97.7 MHz) is a non-commercial FM radio station licensed to Los Altos, California, owned by the Educational Media Foundation. Its transmitter is located near Cupertino, California. It is the San Jose affiliate for the Air1 religious network. No local programming originates from the station, and it carries network programming full-time. KWAI's transmitter is located near Stevens Creek Reservoir.

KWAI broadcasts in HD Radio.

== History ==
97.7 FM signed on the air on October 1, 1960 as KPGM. The station picked up the KPEN call sign in 1969 after they were dropped by KIOI in 1968. The call sign was changed to KLZE (Classy FM) in October 1984.

In January 1988, 97.7 became KHQT ("Hot 97.7"), with a Rhythmic Top 40 format. They became very popular in the South Bay, competing with mainstream Top 40 station KWSS during its first few years.

The format continued until August 7, 1995, when the station was sold to Susquehanna Radio and turned into a simulcast of KFOG as KFFG. Susquehanna was acquired by Cumulus Media in 2006.

On February 16, 2017, KFFG filed an application for a Federal Communications Commission construction permit to change the city of license to San Jose. The application was accepted for filing on February 17, 2017. However, the station still maintains Los Altos as its city of license.

On February 13, 2019, Cumulus Media announced it would sell six stations, including KFFG, to the Educational Media Foundation for $103.5 million, indicating that the KFFG would become a CCM station. EMF announced that the station would join their K-Love network upon the sale's closure. The sale was approved on May 13, and the deal closed at the end of the month. At 7:00 p.m. on May 31, 2019, after playing "High Hopes" by Panic! at the Disco, the simulcast broke and KFFG flipped to CCM programming, joining K-Love. As part of the format change, KFFG's call sign became KJLV, which was transferred from a K-Love affiliate in Arkansas.

Following EMF's purchase of 95.3 KRTY (now KJLV), the K-Love format was moved to 95.3 FM, with 97.7 FM joining the Air 1 network. On August 8, 2023, the station's call sign was changed to KWAI.
