= KZY =

Radio station in Oakland, California (1921–1923)

KZY was a radio station located in Oakland, California, that was licensed to the Atlantic-Pacific Radio Supplies Company from December 9, 1921, until its deletion on January 24, 1923. It, and the Preston D. Allen station, KZM, were the first broadcasting stations licensed to Oakland.

KZY was the successor to experimental station 6XC, which dated to mid-1920, and which founder Lee de Forest suggested deserved credit as the "first radio-telephone station devoted solely" to broadcasting to the public. Including its predecessor, KZY's broadcasting history predated that of many better-known pioneer stations, including WWJ in Detroit, Michigan (started August 1920, originally as 8MK), and KDKA in Pittsburgh, Pennsylvania (debuted November 2, 1920, as 8ZZ).

== 6XC (California Theater station) ==
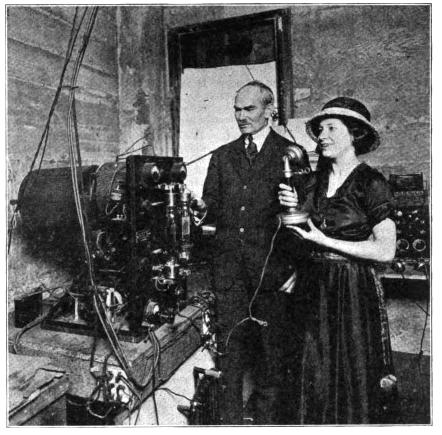
Mary White with Lee de Forest, broadcasting at 6XC.

Radio station 6XC was established by radio inventor Lee de Forest following his March 1920 move from New York City to San Francisco. In late 1919, de Forest had restarted an experimental radio station, 2XG (also known as "The Highbridge station"), at his laboratory in New York City, in order to promote the DeForest Radio Telephone and Telegraph company and showcase developments in vacuum-tube technology. Beginning in November 1919, that station had featured a nightly broadcast of news and entertainment. However, in early 1920 de Forest moved 2XG's transmitter from the Bronx to Manhattan without first getting permission from the government, and due to this infraction the local District Radio Inspector ordered him to suspend the station's operations.

De Forest's response was to ship 2XG's 500-watt transmitter from New York to San Francisco, where it was used to start a new station, also operating under an experimental license, now with the call sign 6XC. Ellery W. Stone made arrangements for the station to be located at the California Theater, thus 6XC was commonly referred to as "The California Theater Station". It began operating in April, and was initially licensed to Lee de Forest, Inc. (Note: The "6" in 6XC's call sign indicated that the station was located in the 6th Radio Inspection District, while the "X" signified it held an Experimental license.)

The new station's broadcasts would be even more varied than what had been offered in New York, and de Forest personally oversaw the station's construction. The transmitter was located in the flies of the theater, with an antenna strung from the theater roof to the adjoining Humboldt Bank Building. Acoustics were a challenge, because the orchestra needed to be heard by both the auditorium audience and radio listeners. Because of this restriction, the normal radio studio practice of deadening echoes by the use of wall coverings was unavailable. The solution for radio pickup was to suspend a large horn 40 feet (12 meters) above the orchestra, with the horn located above the quieter string instruments and away from the louder drums and basses.

Daily matinee concerts given at the theater by Herman Heller's orchestra were the main source of programming. The station also featured professional singers, including Mary White and Frieda Hempel, plus lectures by prominent speakers including Ellery Stone and American Radio Relay League president Hiram Percy Maxim. Another special program had Robert Newton Lynch, Vice President and General Manager of the San Francisco Chamber of Commerce, sending greetings to the Japanese Armament Conference delegation as it approached the city aboard the Korea Maru. An estimated 1,500 concerts were broadcast by the end of 1921.

In mid-1921 control of 6XC was transferred to the Atlantic-Pacific Radio Supplies Company, which was the local DeForest company representative. In September, the station's primary schedule consisted of daily (except Sunday) concerts from 4:00-4:30 p.m., 7:15-7:45 p.m. and 9:00-9:45 p.m., plus Sunday at 10:00-12:00 noon, in addition to daily (except Sunday) "press" from 7:45-8:00 p.m. The station transmitted on a longwave wavelength of 1,250 meters (240 kHz).

== KZY (Rock Ridge station) ==
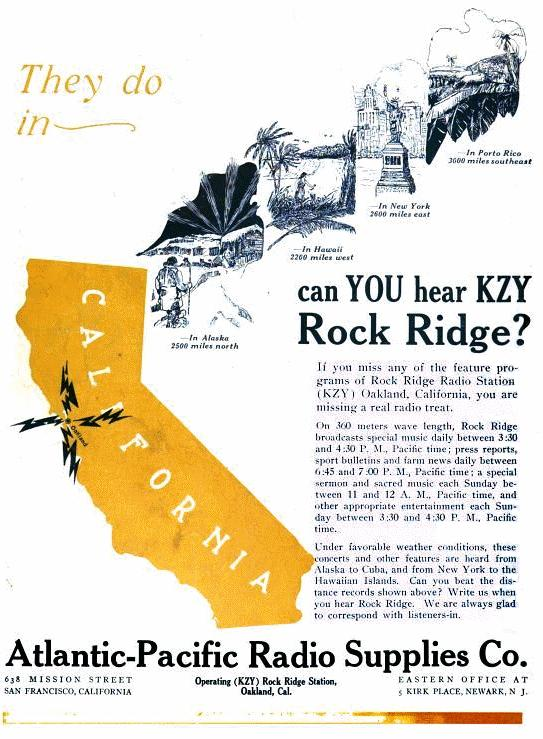
Advertisement for radio station KZY.

Although initially there were no formal standards for U.S. radio stations that provided entertainment broadcasts, effective December 1, 1921, the Department of Commerce adopted a regulation requiring that stations engaged in broadcasting to the public now needed to hold a Limited Commercial license. (Note: The first California station to meet this standard was Arno A. Kluge's KQL, first licensed on October 13, 1921.) Therefore, a new license, with the randomly assigned call sign of KZY, was issued for the station on December 8, 1921. At the same time, it was decided to transfer the station to the home of Henry M. Shaw, the Atlantic-Pacific Radio Supplies president, located in the Rock Ridge section of Oakland, California, and operate KZY from there.

After a rush to move the facility to the new site, KZY's official opening took place on Christmas morning, December 25, 1921, with a live concert of Christmas-themed music. 6XC had operated on its own longwave frequency, but the new regulations required that all broadcasting stations use a shared entertainment wavelength of 360 meters (833 kilohertz). Under the initial timesharing agreement, KZY's schedule was 3:30-4:30 p.m. and 7:00–7:30 p.m. daily (except Sundays), plus 3:00–4:00 p.m. on Sundays, 2:30–3:15 p.m. on Wednesdays, and 8:15–9:00 p.m. on Saturdays.

Due to its more remote location, the station attracted fewer prominent artists than it had in San Francisco, although it did feature the radio debut of Glenhall Taylor, who on May 11, 1922, shared the microphone with Stanford University's first president, David Starr Jordan. The station also was known for picking up the signals of other distant radio stations, including WGY, the General Electric station in Schenectady, New York.

Although KZY was well-managed, the station would be short-lived, and gave its last known broadcast the evening of June 17, 1922. At the time it was stated that this was only a temporary suspension, necessitated because Henry M. Shaw had resigned as Atlantic-Pacific's president and the station needed to be moved from his home. There were plans to move KZY back to San Francisco with the new location said to be the Atlantic-Pacific headquarters at 646 Mission Street. However, it does not appear that KZY ever broadcast from the new location, and later that year the station was reported to have permanently ceased operations, although it was not formally deleted until January 24, 1923.

== See also ==
- List of initial AM-band station grants in the United States
