= KZSJ =

- San Martin, California; United States
- Broadcast area: Santa Clara Valley
- Frequency: 1120 kHz
- Branding: Quê Hương (Homeland)

Programming
- Languages: Vietnamese, Korean

Ownership
- Owner: Bustos Media

History
- First air date: November 1995
- Call sign meaning: Previous Z branding, San Jose

Technical information
- Licensing authority: FCC
- Facility ID: 30906
- Class: D
- Power: 5,000 watts (day); 150 watts (night)
- Transmitter coordinates: 36°57′48.8″N 121°29′25.8″W
- Translator: 101.7 K269GX (San Jose)

Links
- Public license information: Public file; LMS
- Website: youtube.com/@quehuongradio

KZSJ (1120 AM) is a radio station licensed to San Martin, California, United States, and serves San Jose and the Santa Clara Valley. Owned by Bustos Media, the station carries music and talk in Vietnamese and Korean, with programming produced by Quê Hương Media.

== History ==
Founded by Jeffrey Eustis, KZSJ had its first construction permit on January 18, 1991, with the call sign KSJI. The call letters changed to KZSJ on November 1, 1995. Later that month, KZSJ began broadcasting with a Regional Mexican music format that played genres including banda and ranchera as part of the Z-Spanish Radio Network operated by Redwood City entrepreneur Amador Bustos.

Eustis finalized a sale of KZSJ for $450,000 in late January 1996 to Bustos. KZSJ was granted its first broadcasting license on February 21, 1996.

In March 1999, KZSJ entered a local marketing agreement (LMA) with Quê Hương Inc. and changed to a Vietnamese language format. Founded in 1994 on KSJX, Quê Hương was the first 24-hour Vietnamese-language radio station outside of Vietnam. Programming on the Quê Hương radio network has included music, community events, and legal advice geared towards Vietnamese-American communities. By 2003, Bustos moved KZSJ to his Bustos Media company.

By 2003, Quê Hương Radio reached about 200,000 listeners in the San Francisco Bay Area. In July 2003, KZSJ broadcast public service announcements from the San Jose Police Department in Vietnamese expressing condolences to the family of police shooting victim Bich Cau Thi Tran. In September 2003, three relatives of dissident Thadeus Nguyễn Văn Lý were charged by Vietnamese officials for corresponding with Quê Hương Radio and the San Jose–based Commission for Religious Liberty in Vietnam.

Beginning around 2014, KZSJ began broadcasting Korean-language programming on weekday mornings from Santa Clara-based Hanmi Radio.

On February 1, 2018, Bustos Media obtained a construction permit for an FM translator for KZSJ. K269GX broadcasts on 101.7 MHz. The FM translator was formally licensed on April 8, 2020.

== Programming ==
Quê Hương Radio broadcasts throughout the day. Among the local Vietnamese-language media outlets, Quê Hương is known for its stridently anti-communist viewpoint. During the late 1990s, it was a sharp critic of Việt Nam Thời Báo, a local daily newspaper, for the latter's less critical coverage of the Vietnamese government.

== Technical information ==
KZSJ's studios are located in East San Jose. KZSJ broadcasts from a non-directional transmitter in Gilroy. By day, KZSJ is powered at 5 kilowatts, with nighttime power reduced to 150 watts as 1120 AM is a clear-channel frequency.

An FM translator for KZSJ is 101.7 K269GX in San Jose.
