= KMVS =

K-Love radio station in Moss Beach, California

- Moss Beach, California; United States
- Broadcast area: Pacifica; San Francisco; Moss Beach
- Frequency: 89.3 MHz

Programming
- Format: Christian Contemporary
- Network: K-Love

Ownership
- Owner: Educational Media Foundation
- Sister stations: KWAI, KLVS

History
- First air date: August 30, 2010
- Former call signs: KLSI (2003–2010); KARC (2010–2015); KRSA (2015–2017)

Technical information
- Licensing authority: FCC
- Facility ID: 91795
- Class: A
- ERP: 43 watts
- HAAT: 500 meters (1,600 ft)
- Transmitter coordinates: 37.562222°N 122.480500°W

Links
- Public license information: Public file; LMS
- Webcast: Listen live
- Website: klove.com

KMVS (89.3 FM) is a non-commercial radio station owned by Educational Media Foundation in Moss Beach, California, United States. It is branded as "K-Love".

The station started on August 30, 2010. First, it played a classic rock format, later it evolved in 2012 into an adult hits format playing music from the 1980s-now.

On June 12, 2015, KARC changed their call letters to KRSA and shifted its format to adult contemporary, branded as "Relax 103.3".

It can be heard in Pacifica, Moss Beach, San Francisco Sunset District, Daly City, Colma, Burlingame, Brisbane, San Bruno, Millbrae, San Mateo, South San Francisco, and Half Moon Bay.

On October 23, 2017, KRSA changed their format to Christian Contemporary, branded as K-Love. Effective December 11, 2017, Educational Media Foundation acquired the station from Educational Public Radio, Inc., at a purchase price of $25,000. The station changed its call sign to KMVS on December 22, 2017.
