= Oklahoma Hills (album) =

Studio album by Jack Guthrie
- Released: 1991
- Recorded: 1944–1947
- Genre: Western swing
- Length: 1:17:09
- Label: Bear Family Records
- Producer: Lee Gillette/Richard Weize

Professional ratings
Review scores
Source	Rating
Allmusic	4.5/5 stars

Oklahoma Hills is a re-issue of most of the recordings by Jack Guthrie during seven sessions from October 1944 through October 1947.

== Track listing ==
1. Oklahoma Hills – 2:48 - Oct. 16, 1944 - Jack Guthrie-Woody Guthrie.
2. When The Cactus Is In Bloom – 2:39 - Oct. 25, 1944 - Jimmie Rodgers.
3. Next To The Soil – 3:00 - Oct. 22, 1946 - Billy Hughes.
4. Shame On You – 2:30 - Oct. 22, 1946 - Spade Cooley.
5. I’m Brandin’ My Darlin’ With My Heart – 2:35 - Oct. 16, 1944 - Jack Kenney-Lewis Bellin.
6. Careless Darlin’ – 3:08 - Oct. 16, 1944 - Ernest Tubb-Lou Wayne-Bob Shelton.
7. Oakie Boogie – 2:27 - Oct. 22, 1946 - Johnny Tyler.
8. In The Shadows Of My Heart – 2:38 - Jan. 20, 1946 - Billy Hughes.
9. For Oklahoma, I’m Yearning – 2:23 - Oct. 25, 1947 - Wava White-Jack Guthrie.
10. No Need To Knock On My Door – 2:27 - Oct. 24/25, 1947 - Billy Hughes.
11. Shut That Gate – 2:15 - Oct. 24/25, 1947 - Ted Daffan-Dick James.
12. I’m Tellin’ You – 2:51 - Mar. 19, 1946 - Billy Hughes-Texas Jim Lewis.
13. Chained To A Memory – 2:42 - Mar. 19, 1946 - Jenny Lou Carson.
14. Look Out For The Crossing – 2:33 - Mar. 19, 1946 - Ike Cargill-Cottonseed Clark.
15. Dallas Darlin’ – 2:40 - Oct. 25, 1944 - Frank Harford-Edyth Bergdahl.
16. Colorado Blues – 2:26 - Oct. 24/25, 1947 - Traditional.
17. Welcome Home Stranger – 2:18 - Oct. 25, 1944 - Jack Kenney.
18. I Still Love You As I Did In Yesterday – 2:40 - Oct. 25, 1946.
19. Oklahoma’s Calling – 3:03 - Jan. 20, 1946 - Jack Guthrie.
20. The Clouds Rained Trouble Down – 2:28 - Mar. 19, 1946 - Ike Cargill.
21. Answer To ’Moonlights And Skies’ – 2:42 - Oct. 25, 1944 - Jimmie Rodgers-Leon "Jack" Guthrie.
22. Please, Oh Please – 3:01 - Jan. 20, 1946 - Jack Guthrie.
23. I Loved You Once But I Can’t Trust You Now – 2:32 - Jan. 20, 1946 - Billy Hughes-Johnny Tyler.
24. Out Of Sight - Out Of Mind – 2:35 - Oct. 24/25, 1947 - Ned Brisben.
25. I’m Building A Stairway To Heaven – 2:47 - Oct. 25, 1944 - Jack Kenney.
26. Ida Red – 2:40 - Oct. 25, 1947 - Traditional.
27. I Told You Once – 2:36 - Oct. 25, 1947 - Jerry Irby.
28. San Antonio Rose – 2:42 - Oct. 25, 1947 - Bob Wills.
29. You Laughed And I Cried – 2:53 - Mar. 19, 1946 - Ray Whitley-Milton Leeds-Billy Hayes.

== Sessions ==
- Oct. 16, 1944: Jack Guthrie, vocal; Porky Freeman, lead guitar; Red Murrell, rhythm guitar; Cliffie Stone, bass; Billy Hughes, fiddle.
- Oct. 25, 1944: Jack Guthrie, vocal; Porky Freeman, lead guitar; Red Murrell, rhythm guitar; Cliffie Stone, bass; Billy Hughes, fiddle.
- Jan. 29, 1946: Jack Guthrie, vocal; Porky Freeman, lead guitar; Red Murrell, rhythm guitar; Cliffie Stone, bass; Billy Hughes, fiddle.
- Mar. 19, 1946: Jack Guthrie, vocal; Porky Freeman, lead guitar; Red Murrell, rhythm guitar; Cliffie Stone, bass; Billy Hughes, fiddle.
- Oct. 22, 1946: Jack Guthrie, vocal; Porky Freeman, lead guitar; Red Murrell, rhythm guitar; Cliffie Stone, bass; Smokey Fields, fiddle.
- Oct. 24/25, 1947: Jack Guthrie, vocal; Porky Freeman, lead guitar; Jack Lewis Rivers, rhythm guitar; Cliffie Stone, bass; Billy Hughes, fiddle.
- Oct. 25, 1947: Jack Guthrie, vocal; Porky Freeman, lead guitar; Jack Lewis Rivers, rhythm guitar; Cliffie Stone, bass; Billy Hughes, fiddle.
