= Jack Guthrie =

American musician (1915–1948)

- Also known as: Oke (to friends)
- Born: Leon Jerry Guthrie; November 13, 1915; Olive, Oklahoma, U.S.
- Died: January 15, 1948 (aged 32) Livermore, California, U.S.
- Genres: Western swing
- Occupations: Singer, songwriter
- Years active: 1940s

Leon Jerry "Jack" Guthrie (November 13, 1915 – January 15, 1948) was an American songwriter and performer whose rewritten version of the Woody Guthrie song "Oklahoma Hills" was a hit in 1945. The two musicians were cousins.

== Early life ==
Born in Olive, Oklahoma, Guthrie was a cousin of Woody Guthrie. He grew up around horses and musical instruments before the family moved to California in the mid-1930s, where he took on the nicknames "Jack", "Oklahoma", and "Oke". He competed in rodeo as a bucking-horse rider and in 1937 traveled with Woody to Los Angeles where they landed on The Oke & Woody Show on KFVD radio in Hollywood.

== Career ==
Guthrie's song "Oklahoma Hills" (Capitol 201) reached No. 1 in 1945, staying on the charts for 19 weeks. The b side, "I'm A Brandin' My Darlin' With My Heart", reached No. 5 later that year. At the time the record became a hit Jack Guthrie was in the U.S. Army and stationed in the Pacific Theater. After his service time ended, he wrote and recorded more songs, and played live concerts up and down the West Coast. In July 1947 he was admitted to a hospital with tuberculosis. He died in 1948 in Livermore, California.

Guthrie's style was influenced by Jimmie Rodgers and adapted to fit his cowboy image. Although the labels listed 'Jack Guthrie & His Oklahomans' as the artist, in reality Guthrie had no working band. The studio brought in some of its better musicians to back Guthrie. Many of them, like Porky Freeman, Red Murrell, Cliffie Stone, and Billy Hughes were recording artists in their own right.

== Discography ==
Year	Part #	Titles	Notes
Capitol Records
1945	201	Oklahoma Hills // I'm Brandin' My Darlin' Within My Heart	as 'Jack Guthrie & His Oklahomans'
1946	246	I Loved You Once But I Can't Trust You Now // When The Cactus Is In Bloom	as 'Jack Guthrie & His Oklahomans'
1946	309	I'm Tellin' You // Chained To A Memory	as 'Jack Guthrie & His Oklahomans'
1947	341	Oakie Boogie // The Clouds Rained Trouble Down	as 'Jack Guthrie & His Oklahomans'
1947	406	You Laughed And I Cried // It's Too Late To Change Your Mind	as 'Jack Guthrie & His Oklahomans'
1947	40012	This Troubled Mind O' Mine // I'm Building A Stairway To Heaven	as 'Jack Guthrie & His Oklahomans'
1947	48005	Shame On You // Oklahoma Hills (B-side by Jimmy Wakely)	as 'Jack Guthrie & His Oklahomans'
1947	40032	Please, Oh Please // Oklahoma's Calling	as 'Jack Guthrie & His Oklahomans'
1948	40075	Ida Red // Next To The Soil	as 'Jack Guthrie & His Oklahomans'
1948	48016*	Oklahoma Hills // When The Cactus Is In Bloom (reissues)	as 'Jack Guthrie & His Oklahomans'
1948	48017*	This Troubled Mind O' Mine // Chained To A Memory (reissues)	as 'Jack Guthrie & His Oklahomans'
1948	48018*	Oakie Boogie // Oklahoma's Calling (reissues)	as 'Jack Guthrie & His Oklahomans'
1948	40118	You're Gonna Be Sorry (Some Of These Days) // Bow Down Brother	as 'Jack Guthrie & His Oklahomans'
1948	15251	In The Shadows Of My Heart // Answer To Moonlight And Skies	as 'Jack Guthrie & His Oklahomans'
1948	15266	Oklahoma Hills // Oakie Boogie (reissues)	as 'Jack Guthrie & His Oklahomans'
1949	40131	No Need To Knock Upon My Door // Look Out For The Crossing	as 'Jack Guthrie & His Oklahomans'
1949	40222	Colorado Blues // Welcome Home Stranger	as 'Jack Guthrie & His Oklahomans'
1952	F2128	Oklahoma Hills // Oakie Boogie (reissues)	as 'Jack Guthrie & His Oklahomans'

note: (*) also released as part of the 3-disc 78 rpm album set Oklahoma Hills: Jack Guthrie Memorial Album (Capitol AC-76).

== Compilations ==
- Oklahoma Hills (Bear Family BCD-15580, 1991)

== See also ==
- Oklahoma Hills

== Bibliography ==
- Whitburn, Joel. The Billboard Book of Top 40 Country Hits. Billboard Books, 2006. ISBN 0-8230-8291-1
