= KZSF =

Regional Mexican radio station in San Jose, California

- San Jose, California; United States
- Broadcast area: San Francisco Bay Area
- Frequency: 1370 kHz
- Branding: La Kaliente

Programming
- Format: Regional Mexican
- Affiliations: San Jose Earthquakes

Ownership
- Owner: Carlos A. Duharte

History
- First air date: June 21, 1947
- Former call signs: KEEN (1947–1993); KKSJ (1993–1998)
- Call sign meaning: Previous "Z" branding, San Francisco

Technical information
- Licensing authority: FCC
- Facility ID: 68841
- Class: B
- Power: 5,000 watts
- Transmitter coordinates: 37°21′27.8″N 121°52′20.8″W

Links
- Public license information: Public file; LMS

KZSF (1370 AM) is a radio station licensed to San Jose, California, United States and serves the San Francisco Bay Area. The station has been owned by Carlos A. Duharte since 2001 and has a regional Mexican music format branded "La Kaliente 1370 AM."

For much of its history, KZSF has been a music radio station. Founded by George Mardikian and United Broadcasting Company, the station signed on with call sign KEEN in 1947 and operated out of the historic Hotel De Anza in San Jose for its first 27 years. After beginning with a general full service format, KEEN became a country and western station in the mid-1950s and would retain that format for over 35 years, with performers such as Red Murrell and Foy Willing among its on-air hosts. KEEN also featured live sports coverage; it broadcast the San Jose State Spartans and Santa Clara Broncos in the late 1950s and throughout the 1960s and the Oakland Athletics during the early to mid-1970s.

In 1993, KEEN went silent for several months after losing its transmitter license and returned to the air in 1994 as KKSJ and a pop standards format branded "Magic 1370." Founding owner United Broadcasting sold the station in 1997. After one year with an Asian ethnic format, KKSJ became KZSF in 1998 and took on its present regional Mexican music format. KZSF would be sold twice more in the late 1990s before finally being purchased by Duharte in 2001.

== History ==
=== As KEEN (1947–1993) ===
Founded by United Broadcasting Company, whose president was George Mardikian, KZSF came on the air in 1947 as a 1,000 watt station with call sign KEEN and a transmitter on a North San Jose orchard near the town border with Milpitas. KEEN was first granted a construction permit by the Federal Communications Commission (FCC) in 1945. At 8 p.m. on June 21, 1947, KEEN's grand opening broadcast took place at the Hotel De Anza in Downtown San Jose and featured comedian Red Skelton. Two months later, KEEN was officially licensed by the FCC on August 21. In its early years, KEEN broadcast a full service format with popular music, news, and sports. Programming included news from the United Press, Saturday night barn dances, and University of Santa Clara baseball games. By 1954, KEEN had a country and western music format featuring hosts like Red Murrell, Cal Smith, and Foy Willing. KEEN began broadcasting San Jose State College football games in 1953.

On September 19, 1957, KEEN was granted a license for a new transmitter with a stronger daytime broadcasting power of 5,000 watts. By 1960, KEEN added San Jose State basketball. The following year, KEEN began broadcasting select Santa Clara basketball games.

In 1963, United Broadcasting launched a sister station that played pop standards, KEEN-FM, on 100.3 MHz. KEEN began broadcasting at its current power level of 5,000 watts at both day and night on August 26, 1964. By 1966, KEEN began playing selections from comedy records in addition to country music. The two KEEN stations no longer shared call letters in 1967, as KEEN-FM became KBAY. KEEN expanded its live sports play-by-play to include Santa Clara football in 1969.

The 1970s marked several changes for KEEN. Murrell left KEEN in 1970 after 16 years. After the 1970–71 season, KEEN phased out its live college sports coverage in favor of pro sports. Santa Clara sports broadcasts moved to Los Altos FM station KPEN, and San Jose State broadcasts also moved to FM on Santa Clara's KREP. From 1971 to 1975, KEEN was the flagship station of the Oakland A's Radio Network. KEEN also broadcast California Golden Seals games until the team moved out of the Bay Area in 1976. After over 25 years operating out of Hotel De Anza, United Broadcasting moved the KEEN and KBAY to West San Jose in 1974, on the top floor of the Golden Pacific Building at Winchester Boulevard.

By 1976, KEEN began playing newer country singles on weekday afternoons while focusing on classic country for the rest of the day. Following a request filed in 1979, the FCC approved the relocation of KEEN's studios to Campbell in 1982.

By January 1992, KEEN faced declining ratings and advertising revenue due to competition from FM stations, including new FM country station KRTY. These factors led United Broadcasting to announce that KEEN would be a simulcast of easy listening FM sister station KBAY. However, following much feedback from listeners and advertisers, United Broadcasting reversed this decision. However, beginning April 1 that year, KEEN cut its on-air staff to three hosts during daytime hours and broadcast syndicated music by satellite in other time slots. KEEN went off the air on January 1, 1993, after losing its transmitter lease a month earlier as the city of San Jose planned to build nearly 250 houses in the area.

=== As KKSJ (1993–1998) ===
On October 11, 1993, KEEN became KKSJ. After United Broadcasting made an arrangement for KKSJ to share the transmitter site near U.S. Highway 101, a Union Pacific Railroad overpass, and an Eggo factory with fellow San Jose AM station KSJX, KKSJ resumed broadcasting in 1994 with the brand "Magic 1370" and a pop standards format inspired by the former "Magic 61" brand of San Francisco's KFRC. "Magic 1370" had a playlist from a 1,700-song library, including nearly 175 Frank Sinatra songs and others by artists including Ella Fitzgerald and Tony Bennett. Jim Lange, former KFRC DJ and host of The Dating Game, joined KKSJ as a weekend host.

KKSJ rose from being unranked in the winter 1994 Arbitron Bay Area ratings to a 2.9 share by the fall of 1994. Lange left KKSJ in 1996.

In January 1997, United Broadcasting sold KKSJ and KBAY to American Radio Systems for a combined $31.2 million. American Radio subsequently laid off two hosts and dropped the locally programmed music for the syndicated Stardust music service. American Radio sold KKSJ to Douglas Broadcasting for $3.2 million in June 1997 and changed it to an Asian ethnic format with Vietnamese and Cantonese programming.

=== As KZSF (1998–present) ===
On January 20, 1998, the station changed its call sign to the current KZSF and entered a local marketing agreement to be a San Francisco Bay Area affiliate of Amador Bustos's Z-Spanish Radio Network of regional Mexican music stations, alongside sister station KZSF-FM in Alameda. Bustos bought KZSF and five other stations from Douglas Broadcasting for $27 million in June 1998. For the first time since 1982 as KEEN, KZSF operated in San Jose, with a new location at Wooster Avenue near North San Jose. In June 2001, Carlos Duharte bought KZSF for $5 million and relocated the station to Tisch Way in West San Jose.

With its 1998 change to regional Mexican, KZSF added Spanish-language broadcasts of local sports teams, the San Francisco Giants baseball team and San Jose Clash (later Earthquakes) soccer team. However, the number of Giants games on the station declined from 81 home games in 1999 and 2000 to 40 in 2001 due to the Giants' inability to find advertisers. After a hiatus, KZSF resumed Spanish broadcasts of Earthquakes games in 2004 and 2005 before resuming the broadcasts long term beginning in 2010.

Until April 2002, KZSF was branded "1370 AM La Z." In May 2002, KZSF changed its branding to "La Kaliente."

From 2004 to 2005, KZSF broadcast Oakland Raiders games in Spanish, before those broadcasts were moved to KLOK in 2006. KZSF rejoined the Oakland A's Radio Network in 2005, broadcasting 48 games in Spanish. KZSF resumed broadcasting Raiders games in Spanish from 2009 to 2010.

On October 9, 2010, KZSF went temporarily off the air after a grass fire burned down KZSF's transmitter that it shared with Vietnamese-language KSJX on Wooster Avenue near an Eggo factory and U.S. Route 101 in central San Jose. KZSF broadcast under a special temporary authority with an emergency transmitter from October 25, 2010, until rebuilding the Wooster Avenue transmitter and officially renewing its license on November 22, 2013.

== Programming ==
On weekdays, KZSF broadcasts a variety of Mexican music, including a nightly program dedicated to corridos and ranchera, along with Spanish-language public affairs, advice, and sports talk shows. Celina Rodriguez, a former news anchor for local TV stations KDTV and KSTS, has hosted a talk show on KZSF since 2006. Additionally, KZSF carries Spanish-language broadcasts of San Jose Earthquakes games.
