= KSOL (disambiguation) =

KSOL is a Spanish language radio station in San Francisco, California.

KSOL may also refer to:

- Radio stations formerly known as KSOL:
  - KEST, radio station in San Francisco, California
  - KSAN (FM), radio station licensed to San Mateo, California
  - KYLD, radio station in San Francisco, California
