= KBRG =

Radio station in San Jose, California

- San Jose, California; United States
- Broadcast area: San Francisco and Monterey Bay areas
- Frequency: 100.3 MHz (HD Radio)
- Branding: Amor 100.3

Programming
- Format: Spanish AC
- Subchannels: HD3: South Asian / Hindi Geet "Suno FM"

Ownership
- Owner: Uforia Audio Network; (Univision Radio Bay Area, Inc.)
- Sister stations: KVVF, KSOL, KSQL, KVVZ

History
- First air date: March 4, 1963
- Former call signs: KEEN-FM (1963–1967); KBAY (1967–1997)
- Call sign meaning: K-BRIDGE (former station from 105.3)

Technical information
- Licensing authority: FCC
- Facility ID: 68839
- Class: B
- ERP: 14,500 watts
- HAAT: 786 meters (2,579 ft)
- Transmitter coordinates: 37°6′40″N 121°50′34″W

Links
- Public license information: Public file; LMS
- Webcast: Listen Live
- Website: Amor 100.3

KBRG (100.3 FM Amor 100.3) is a commercial radio station licensed to San Jose, California, with a Spanish AC radio format. The station is owned by TelevisaUnivision. Its studios are located at 1940 Zanker Road in San Jose, and the transmitter is on Loma Prieta Peak on the Santa Clara/Santa Cruz County line.

== History ==
=== KEEN-FM and KBAY ===
KEEN-FM came to air March 4, 1963, after rushing to meet FCC deadlines and fix issues with its problematic transmitter. It was owned by United Broadcasting as the FM counterpart to KEEN AM 1370, but it offered easy listening music instead of KEEN's characteristic country format.

In 1967, KEEN-FM became KBAY, an easy listening station that remained as such for decades. In the early 1980s, it moved toward a soft adult contemporary sound.

=== KBRG comes to 100.3 ===
In 1997, the Snell family, owners of United Broadcasting, sold their holdings. The buyer for KBAY was American Radio Systems. American Radio Systems immediately swapped with EXCL Communications, a subsidiary of Latin Communications Group. EXCL traded the Fremont-based KBRG facility at 104.9, an FM station in Portland, $2 million in cash and 150,000 shares of Latin Communications Group stock for the KBAY facility and Sacramento's KSSJ. ARS kept the KBAY call letters and format, which became part of a three-way station swap on December 31, 1997. KBAY moved from 100.3 to Gilroy 94.5, the former KUFX, while KUFX briefly moved to 104.9 before changing again in 1998.

=== KBRG history ===
KBRG began as an English-language station, debuting in 1964 on 105.3 (now KITS) carrying a stereo classics format under the name "K-Bridge."

KBRG was the Bay Area's first Spanish-language FM station as Stereo En Español and later Caballero Spanish Radio. In December 1983, it moved to 104.9 (now KXSC) before being part of the ARS/EXCL swap on December 31, 1997.

From 1968 through 1971, KBRG broadcast Oakland A's games, with Víctor Manuel Torres at the mike.

In 1989, EXCL Communications purchased KBRG (previously on 104.9) from Radio America, Inc. EXCL brought the Radio Romántica Spanish AC format to 100.3 after moving from 104.9. During the 1990s, EXCL adapted the Radio Romántica format to several western Hispanic and Latino radio markets. After EXCL was acquired by Entravision in 2000, Entravision began to phase out the format. KBRG was the last station using the Radio Romántica format after Univision Radio Network purchased KBRG from Entravision on January 1, 2006 and switched it to Spanish Adult Hits under the name Recuerdo 100.3.

On February 6, 2018, Univision dropped the "Más Variedad" Spanish Adult Hits format and switched it to Spanish AC as Amor 100.3. Although the music and radio shows are syndicated and heard from KOMR in Phoenix, Arizona and KLQV in San Diego, California simultaneously, which also carries the Amor format. The “Amor” stations are similar to KLVE in Los Angeles, California which is one of the most listened Spanish language radio stations in the United States.

In March 2019, Univision placed all their stations into their new Uforia Audio Network. The station joined Uforia on March 15.
