= KSQL =

Coordinates: 37.111°N 121.845°W

Satellite of KSOL, San Francisco
- Santa Cruz, California; United States
- Broadcast area: Santa Clara Valley
- Frequency: 99.1 MHz
- Branding: Qué Buena 98.9 y 99.1

Programming
- Format: Regional Mexican

Ownership
- Owner: Uforia Audio Network; (Univision Radio Bay Area, Inc.)
- Sister stations: KBRG, KSOL, KVVF, KVVZ

History
- Former call signs: KLRS (1987–1990); KDBQ (1990–1993); KSRI (1993–1994); KYLZ (1994–1996); KZOL (1996–2002); KZMR (2002–2003)
- Call sign meaning: Derived from sister station KSOL

Technical information
- Licensing authority: FCC
- Facility ID: 70033
- Class: B
- ERP: 1,100 watts
- HAAT: 796 meters (2,612 ft)

Links
- Public license information: Public file; LMS
- Webcast: Listen Live
- Website: Que Buena 98.9 & 99.1 Website

KSQL (99.1 MHz, "Qué Buena 98.9 y 99.1") is a Spanish language radio station in Santa Cruz, California. The station simulcasts the signal of KSOL (98.9 MHz) in San Francisco. KSOL and KSQL program a format consisting of regional Mexican music and some comedy talk shows. Both stations are owned by TelevisaUnivision USA. The radio studios and offices are in the Financial District of San Francisco. The KSQL transmitter is in Loma Prieta.

There are two booster stations for KSOL: KSOL-FM2 in Sausalito since 1992, and KSOL-FM3 in Pleasanton since 1997.

== History ==
KSQL was originally built in 1962, as KSCO-FM, owned by the Santa Cruz Sentinel newspaper. Due to close-spacing of 99.1 to San Francisco's 98.9, interference between the stations had been a longtime problem. When Viacom bought 98.9 in San Francisco, they also bought KSCO-FM 99.1 and began simulcasting the stations. They also began using similar callsigns.

The 98.9 MHz frequency in San Francisco is the third station to use the callsign KSOL. The first was the AM rhythm and blues station at 1450 kHz (the current KEST). The second was a popular soul music station at 107.7 MHz (now known as KSAN). The current KSOL is unrelated to the previous two stations.

- See also KSAN (FM) and KEST

The station at 99.1 MHz was, for many years, KLRS ("Colors"), airing a New Age music format targeting Santa Cruz and San Jose. The station was eventually purchased Viacom the two stations tweaked KOFY's adult album alternative format and adopted the call letters KDBK (98.9 MHz) and KDBQ (99.1 MHz) – "Double 99" in July 1990.

"Star FM" arrived on the two frequencies in Spring 1993, as the call letters KSRY and KSRI were picked up for the stations' hot adult contemporary format.

One year later, the station at 107.7 MHz switched their call letters to KYLD in April 1994, but was already called "WiLD 107" since 1992, as a rhythmic formatted station. The KSOL call letters were put on then-co-owned 98.9 MHz frequency, with the format switching to urban adult contemporary. The south signal of 99.1 MHz became a simulcast of "WiLD 107" as KYLZ.

Both KSOL and KYLZ were sold in August 1996. On August 15 of that year, KSOL switched to a regional Mexican format, and 99.1 MHz became KZOL, again a simulcast.

In April 2002, KSOL swapped call letters with KEMR (105.7 MHz) in San Jose, and shifted toward a Spanish-language adult contemporary approach consisting of Spanish Adult Hits, with 99.1 MHz becoming KZMR. When 105.7 MHz switched formats and call letters to KVVF, the KSOL call letters returned to 98.9 MHz, with 99.1 MHz becoming KSQL.

The two station have simulcasted since 1990, with 98.9 MHz covering the north bay, and 99.1 MHz covering the far south bay.

== See also ==
- KSOL
