= KSOL =

Regional Mexican radio station in San Francisco

Coordinates: 37.755°N 122.453°W

- San Francisco, California; United States
- Broadcast area: San Francisco Bay Area
- Frequency: 98.9 MHz (HD Radio)
- Branding: Que Buena 98.9 y 99.1

Programming
- Format: Regional Mexican
- Subchannels: HD2: TUDN Radio (Spanish Sports)
- Affiliations: Las Vegas Raiders (NFL)

Ownership
- Owner: Uforia Audio Network; (Univision Radio Bay Area, Inc.)
- Sister stations: KBRG, KSQL, KVVF, KVVZ

History
- First air date: July 1, 1947 (79 years ago)
- Former call signs: See below
- Call sign meaning: SOuL (old format); SOL = Spanish for "sun"

Technical information
- Facility ID: 70032
- Class: B
- ERP: 6,100 watts
- HAAT: 409 meters (1,342 ft)
- Repeaters: 99.1 KSQL (Santa Cruz); See also § Boosters

Links
- Webcast: Listen Live
- Website: Que Buena

KSOL (98.9 FM "Que Buena 98.9 y 99.1") is a Spanish language radio station in San Francisco, California. KSQL (99.1 FM) simulcasts the station in Santa Cruz. KSOL and KSQL program a format consisting of regional Mexican music and talk shows. Both stations are owned by TelevisaUnivision USA. Its studios are located at 1940 Zanker Road in San Jose, and the KSOL transmitter is on Mount Sutro.

The 98.9 frequency is the third station in the San Francisco market to use the callsign KSOL. The first was the AM rhythm and blues station at 1450 AM (the current KEST). Sly Stone was influential in guiding KSOL into soul music and started calling the station K-SOUL. The second was a popular soul music station (sans the K-SOUL moniker), at 107.7 FM (now known as KSAN). The current KSOL is unrelated to the previous two stations.

== History ==
The station at 98.9 was established on July 1, 1947, as KJBS-FM, the FM simulcast component of KJBS 1100 (now KFAX) by Julius Brunton & Sons, transmitting from the (still-existing) tower atop Clay Jones Apartments at 1250 Jones Street. It was the first FM station in the San Francisco area. As KJBS it had been a full-service station with news, weather, and sports programming, and served as a relay, interrupting programming overnight, to alert police and fire personnel to incidents, prior to the departments' own radio dispatch systems. The FM station was financially unsuccessful, and in 1953 it was sold to CBS. KCBS-FM had been operating with substantially lower power on 103.7 when it made the move to acquire this station.

Under CBS it rebroadcast KCBS until 1968 when it began to use the syndicated CBS automated programming, "The Young Sound". Later, it produced its own locally originated rock programming.

In September 1978, owner CBS wanted a still more powerful FM assignment, so they arranged a three-station swap that enabled them to be heard on a much stronger signal. KCBS-FM, their format and intellectual property moved to KEAR's 97.3 FM frequency, KMPX moved their big band and swing music format and callsign from 106.9 FM to 98.9 FM, and KEAR moved their Christian-based format from 97.3 FM to 106.9 FM.

- See also KEAR (AM), KZDG, KFRC-FM, KLLC, and KMPX (FM)

=== The Quake ===
In 1982, KMPX was sold to a New Jersey investor group, administered by general manager Les Elias and station manager Bob Heymann, and flipped to a mainstream rock format as KQAK, "The Quake FM99", on August 23 of that year. Hosting the morning show was the popular Alex Bennett, who had left KMEL in a disagreement over station direction a few months earlier.

KQAK was a personality-oriented album-oriented rock station for its first eight months of operation, and was partially influenced by the programming of WLUP in Chicago, a station that Elias and Heymann had previously managed. The logos for these stations were very similar and made by the same graphic designer.

A talented air staff was assembled for the station. In addition to Bennett was Joe Regelski as co-host, continuing their collaboration from KMEL, and Richard "Big Rick" Stuart, future KROQ jock Jed "Jed the Fish" Gould The 3rd, Mike Koste, Richard Gossett, Belle Nolan, Rob Francis, Oscar "Oz" Medina, Paul "Lobster" Wells, comedian Tim Bedore and others worked at The Quake at one time or another.

A month after KQAK's debut, another Bay Area station, KFOG changed its format from beautiful music to rock. This change left the Bay Area with six very similar-sounding stations (KMEL, KRQR, KQAK and KFOG, plus San Jose stations KOME and KSJO). Until 2019, KFOG was the only one of those stations still carrying a rock format, when it switched to a simulcast of sports station KNBR.

In April 1983, Elias and Heymann decided to reposition the station (under the programming guidance of Rick Carroll from KROQ-FM) as the "Rock of the '80s," emphasizing new wave, punk, reggae, 2 Tone ska, first generation Gothic rock, tracks from the 1960s and 1970s by musicians whose work influenced later punk and new wave performers, and the occasional novelty track. The modern rock format of The Quake has become much more memorable than their AOR incarnation, and its later demise was an important catalyst for a shift to a similar but more polished presentation at "Live 105" (KITS) in 1986.

Popular programs on The Quake, in addition to shows like, "The Alex Bennett's Morning Program", "The Quake's Early Tremors", "Midnight Dread" and a syndicated program called "The Rock Over London".

The KQAK broadcast studios were located at 1311 Sutter Street in San Francisco.

The final song broadcast before The Quake went off the air for transmitter maintenance after midnight on June 18, 1985, was "Around The Dial" from The Kinks; this featured a re-edited version of the 'radio tuning' intro for the song which made reference to the demise of the station. This was followed by several station IDs before the signal was cut off. It was unknown whether the new owners would take over the next morning, but The Quake continued until noon the following day with one last show from Alex Bennett, followed by Jed the Fish playing music. He said final goodbyes over Prince's “Controversy,” then played the final song “Hey Girl” by Gruppo Sportivo before transitioning to KKCY's stunting with two days of Brian Eno music.

Later, another station, progressive talk radio KQKE, went on to use the same "Quake" nickname. Paul "Lobster" Wells has worked for KQKE, which was otherwise not related to KQAK. Today, the station, AM 960, is KNEW.

The KQAK call letters currently reside on a station in Bend, Oregon.

=== More format and ownership changes ===
On June 22, 1985, following four days of stunting with all-Brian Eno music, the station became KKCY ("The City"), with an eclectic rock format, partly inspired by another midwestern station, KTCZ in Minneapolis, Minnesota. All of The Quake's on-air staffers left the station, except for Bennett and his morning sidekick, Joe Regelski who were under contract through August 1987 according to one of their final Quake broadcasts. Bennett ended up never appearing on The city as they had insisted he play more music (he was still being paid in accordance with his contract) and later brought his morning show (sans Regelski, who remained on The city's morning show with a new host) to KITS.

The 98.9 frequency then underwent years of turmoil. In late 1986, the station dropped the eclectic freeform rock in favor of Big Band/Adult Standards (shades of the original KMPX); then, on February 1, 1988, they adopted a short-lived CHR format as KHIT. Both of these changes elicited a large outcry from the dedicated following KKCY's format had gathered. A group called "Coalition To Save The City" was formed and the group lobbied KHIT's owners to change the format back.

The format lasted for 3 months and 5 days, as on May 6, 1988, after playing "Shakedown" by Bob Seger, the station dropped its short-lived CHR format and immediately began simulcasting KOFY for 8 days. The station was eventually purchased by Bay Area media mogul James Gabbert, who changed the callsign to KOFY-FM on May 14, 1988, matching the calls of sister station KOFY-TV (channel 20) and KOFY radio (1050 AM, now KTCT). Gabbert returned the station to the previous adult album alternative format, which lasted for two years amid much tweaking.

The next owner of KOFY-FM, Viacom, later obtained their neighboring station on the dial, KLRS (99.1 FM) in Santa Cruz. The two stations tweaked KOFY's Triple A format to "Rock Adult Contemporary" and adopted the callsigns KDBK (98.9) and KDBQ (99.1) - "Double 99" on July 30, 1990.

The two stations then shifted to a Hot Adult Contemporary format on March 13, 1993, as “Star 99”. The stations' callsigns were also changed to KSRY and KSRI.

=== KSOL call letters arrive at 98.9 FM ===
Logo for Estéreo Sol, 2010-2014

In December 1993, Allen Shaw's Crescent Communications purchased 107.7 KSOL from United Broadcasting, and purchased KSRY and KSRI from Viacom in 1994. Shaw changed 107.7 to KYLD in April 1994, calling it "Wild 107". The callsign KSOL was put on then-co-owned 98.9, with the format switching to urban adult contemporary on April 18, 1994, where Bay Area Hall of Fame (BAHOF) inductee Don Sainte-Johnn served as morning host. The San Jose signal of 99.1 became a San Jose simulcast of "Wild 107" as KYLZ.

KSOL, KYLD and KYLZ were sold by Crescent Communications to Tichner Media and Evergreen Media in August 1996. On August 15 of that year, KSOL then switched to a Regional Mexican music format, and 99.1 became KZOL, again a simulcast.

In April 2002, KSOL swapped callsigns with KEMR Amor (105.7 FM) in San Jose, and shifted toward a Spanish-language adult contemporary direction consisting of Spanish Adult Hits, with 99.1 becoming KZMR. When 105.7 switched formats and changed callsign to KVVF, the callsign KSOL returned to 98.9, with 99.1 redubbed KZOL.

The two stations have simulcasted since 1990, with 98.9 covering the North Bay, and 99.1 covering the far South Bay.

== Boosters ==
KSOL is rebroadcast on the following FM Boosters:

Call sign	Frequency	City of license	FID	ERP (W)	HAAT	Class	FCC info
KSOL-FM2	98.9 FM	Sausalito, California	70028	150 (Vert.)	294 m (965 ft)	D	LMS
KSOL-FM3	98.9 FM	Pleasanton, California	14485	185 (Horiz.)	927 m (3,041 ft)	D	LMS

== Callsign history for 98.9 ==
- KJBS-FM: Sign-on February 1, 1948, until 1953, co-owned with KJBS 1100
- KCBS-FM: "CBS FM" 1953 until September 1978, co-owned with KCBS 740
- KMPX: "Multiplex" September 1978
- KQAK: "The Quake" August 1982
- KKCY: "The City" June 1985
- KHIT: "98.9 K-HIT" May 6, 1988, ends with Shakedown, & Judy Davis's announcement says "and this is the end of K-Hit, for all you who were out there" before launching a then-new format & K-O-F-Y coming in the '50s
- KOFY-FM: "Hits 98.9 FM" May 14, 1988, co-owned with KOFY 1050 and KOFY-TV channel 20
- KDBK: "Double 99 FM" August 2, 1990, co-owned with KDBQ 99.1 Santa Cruz
- KSRY: "Star 99 FM" April 16, 1993, co-owned with KSRI 99.1 Santa Cruz
- KSOL: "KSOuL" April 18, 1994, co-owned with KYLZ 99.1 Santa Cruz
- KSOL: "Estereo Sol" August 15, 1996
- KEMR: "Amor" April 10, 2002
- KSOL:"Estereo Sol" January 2, 2003, co-owned with KSQL 99.1 Santa Cruz
- KSOL:"Que Buena" June 12, 2015, co-owned with KSQL 99.1 Santa Cruz

It is believed that 98.9 has had more callsign changes than any other radio or TV station in California history.
