= Viva 105.7 =

Viva 105.7 may refer to:

- WBZY, licensed to serve Canton, Georgia, when it held the call sign WWVA-FM
- KVVF (FM), licensed to serve Santa Clara, California
