= Olive, Oklahoma =

- Unincorporated community
- Location within the state of Oklahoma Olive (the United States)
- Coordinates: 36°01′21″N 96°28′36″W
- Country: United States
- State: Oklahoma
- County: Creek

Area
  - Total: 1.31 sq mi (3.39 km^{2})
  - Land: 1.31 sq mi (3.39 km^{2})
  - Water: 0.0039 sq mi (0.01 km^{2})
- Elevation: 902 ft (275 m)

Population (2020)
  - Total: 110
  - Density: 84.1/sq mi (32.49/km^{2})
- Time zone: UTC-6 (Central (CST))
  - Summer (DST): UTC-5 (CDT)
- FIPS code: 40-55350
- GNIS feature ID: 2805346

Olive is an unincorporated community in Creek County, Oklahoma, United States. As of the 2020 census, Olive had a population of 110. The post office was established November 20, 1896, and discontinued September 30, 1938. The town was named for the daughter of the first postmaster. In 1974 there was a tornado that wiped out the town. As of late 2016, the town had at least one church, a convenience store called "Happy Corner," a K-12 school, and a volunteer fire department. Olive was the birthplace of country singer Leon "Jack" Guthrie.

== Demographics ==
=== 2020 census ===
As of the 2020 census, Olive had a population of 110. The median age was 34.0 years. 23.6% of residents were under the age of 18 and 9.1% of residents were 65 years of age or older. For every 100 females there were 103.7 males, and for every 100 females age 18 and over there were 78.7 males age 18 and over.

0.0% of residents lived in urban areas, while 100.0% lived in rural areas.

There were 48 households in Olive, of which 22.9% had children under the age of 18 living in them. Of all households, 70.8% were married-couple households, 20.8% were households with a male householder and no spouse or partner present, and 6.3% were households with a female householder and no spouse or partner present. About 22.9% of all households were made up of individuals and 4.2% had someone living alone who was 65 years of age or older.

There were 54 housing units, of which 11.1% were vacant. The homeowner vacancy rate was 0.0% and the rental vacancy rate was 0.0%.

Racial composition as of the 2020 census
| Race | Number | Percent |
|---|---|---|
| White | 90 | 81.8% |
| Black or African American | 0 | 0.0% |
| American Indian and Alaska Native | 9 | 8.2% |
| Asian | 0 | 0.0% |
| Native Hawaiian and Other Pacific Islander | 0 | 0.0% |
| Some other race | 1 | 0.9% |
| Two or more races | 10 | 9.1% |
| Hispanic or Latino (of any race) | 4 | 3.6% |

== Education ==
It is in the Olive Public Schools school district.
