= KVVZ =

Satellite of KVVF, Santa Clara, California
- San Rafael, California; United States
- Broadcast area: North Bay - San Francisco
- Frequency: 100.7 MHz (HD Radio)
- Branding: Latino Mix 105.7 y 100.7

Programming
- Format: Spanish CHR

Ownership
- Owner: Uforia Audio Network; (Univision Radio Bay Area, Inc.)
- Sister stations: KBRG, KSOL, KSQL, KVVF

History
- First air date: June 1, 1961; 65 years ago (as KTIM-FM at 100.9)
- Former call signs: KTIM-FM (1961-1987); KTID (1987–1989); KTID-FM (1989–1994); KKHI-FM (1994–1998); KJQI-FM (1998–2001); KSFB (1/2001-6/2001); KSFB-FM (6/2001-2004)
- Former frequencies: 100.9 MHz (1961–1997)
- Call sign meaning: ViVa (old station branding)

Technical information
- Licensing authority: FCC
- Facility ID: 40136
- Class: A
- ERP: 6,000 watts
- HAAT: 700.0 meters (2,296.6 ft)
- Transmitter coordinates: 37°58′49.00″N 122°31′39.00″W

Links
- Public license information: Public file; LMS
- Webcast: Listen Live
- Website: Latino Mix 105.7 y 100.7 Website

KVVZ (100.7 FM) is a commercial radio station licensed to San Rafael, California, and serving the San Francisco area. The station is owned by TelevisaUnivision, through licensee Univision Radio Bay Area, Inc. It simulcasts a Spanish Contemporary radio format with sister station 105.7 KVVF Santa Clara. The studios are in San Jose.

KVVZ has an effective radiated power (ERP) of 6,000 watts. The transmitter is on Robert Dollar Drive in San Rafael.

== History ==
=== KTIM-FM ===
The station first signed on the air on August 23, 1961. The original call sign was KTIM-FM, and it broadcast at 100.9 MHz. The station was owned by Marin Broadcasting Co. In the early 1970s, the station simulcast the MOR format of KTIM during the day, and aired a progressive rock format at night. In the mid-1970s, the station began airing an album-oriented rock format full time.

The album rock format continued through the rest of the 1970s and into the 1980s. In 1980, the station was sold to Platt Communications, and in 1983 the station was sold to Arthur Astor. In the mid-1980s, the station began airing an adult contemporary format. On October 20, 1987, the station's call sign was changed to KTID.

=== Classical, Christian and Reggaeton ===
In 1994, KTID-FM dropped adult contemporary for classical music and ended its simulcast of KTID (AM).

Between 1999 and 2004, the station was KJQI, later KSFB, airing Contemporary Christian music as 100.7 K-JOY (later "The Bridge"). Between 2004 and June 27, 2005, KVVZ began simulcasting with KVVF and became a Spanish-language "pop, rock y reggaeton" station, Viva 100.7. KVVF was acquired by Univision, which later assumed the license of KVVZ in a trade from Salem Communications in 2004. WPPN in Chicago also went to Univision, while stations in Houston, Dallas and Chicago went to Salem. The Dallas station has since been resold.

On October 13, 2011, KVVF's branding as "La Kalle" changed to "Latino Mix." On March 14, 2014, the station began stunting by playing Nelly's "Hot in Herre" uninterrupted.

=== Rhythmic Contemporary ===
On March 17, 2014, KVVZ and KVVF started broadcasting at 5:05pm, beginning with a "history lesson" about the first "Hot" station that covered the San Jose area from 1987 to 1995, followed by the return of Chuy Gomez, a radio host formerly from KMEL, and aired a Mix Show. Although the playlist favored R&B/Hip-Hop hits, KVVF/KVVZ was programmed as a Rhythmic Top 40 and targeted a bilingual and younger Hispanic audience using the same formula as sister station KBBT San Antonio.

In a statement from Station Content Director Makr Arias, “We just feel like The Bay Area has been asking for something new and fresh. It’s a format they call Top 40/Rhythmic with a little bit of hip-hop, R&B and Top 40 crossed-over.”

=== Return of "Latino Mix" ===
On August 30, 2019, the station started stunting by playing J Balvin's "Reggaeton" followed by Vicente Fernández "Volver Volver" uninterrupted, to introduce a comeback to "Latino Mix 100.7."

On September 2, 2019, Latino Mix 100.7 started broadcasting at 12:03pm. The first song played under the return to the Spanish CHR format was J Balvin's "Mi Gente".

== Translator ==
In addition to the main station, KVVZ was relayed over a period of time by this translator to widen its broadcast area. The translator's license was cancelled by the Federal Communications Commission on August 14, 2020.

Call sign	Frequency	City of license	FID	ERP (W)	Class	FCC info
K265DI	100.9 FM	Sausalito, California	40136	80	D	LMS
