= Krikor Amirian =

Krikor Amirian Գրիգոր Ամիրեան
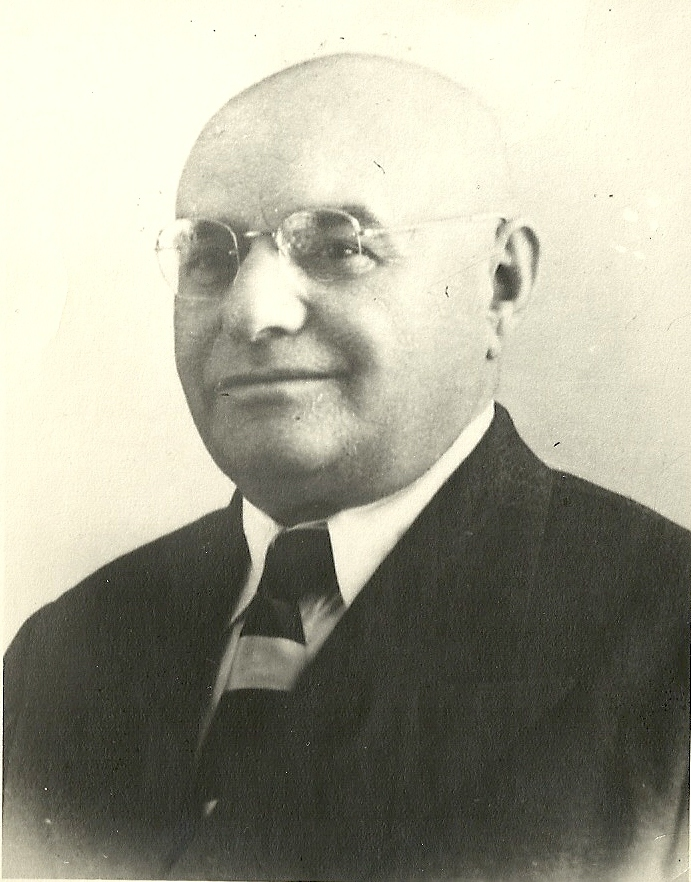

Personal details
- Born: June 20, 1888 Bayburt, Ottoman Empire
- Died: August 1, 1964 (aged 76) Los Angeles, California, United States
- Party: Armenian Revolutionary Federation; Republican Party (United States)
- Spouse: Siranoush Garabedian (1896–1975)
- Children: Christine (1924–2010); Sebouh (1925-2013); Dro (1928-)

Military service
- Allegiance: Ottoman Empire (to 1914); Armenia
- Branch/service: Ottoman Army
- Years of service: 1908–1917
- Rank: Colonel (Çorbacı)
- Unit: First Armenian Volunteer Regiment
- Battles/wars: First Balkan War; World War I

Krikor Amirian (Armenian: Գրիգոր Ամիրեան, June 20, 1888 – August 1, 1964) was an Armenian Revolutionary, who participated in the establishment of the First Republic of Armenia.

== Biography ==
=== Early life ===
Krikor Amirian was born on June 20, 1888, in Bayburt, Turkey. The Amirian family had been influential citizens in Bayburt. Amirian had grown up during the Hamidian Massacres, which was a tumultuous period in Armenian history. In early 1895, Sultan Abdul Hamid II ordered the extermination of specific Armenian districts in the Ottoman Empire. He had ordered thousands of Ottoman troops to take control of Bayburt, because it was one of the most heavily populated Armenian cities on the eastern side of the Ottoman Empire. When Ottoman troops had entered the city, a massive revolt erupted on October 26, 1895. After relentless fighting, the Armenian rebels wanted to make peace with its invaders. Eryia Amirian, Amirian's father, was chosen to represent the city in order to negotiate a truce with Ottoman officials. Instead, he was shot and left on the side of a road to die. The next day, he was eventually found and given a proper burial.

Amirian had been educated at a local Armenian school in Bayburt, and then eventually went to the Turkish Army Officers Academy. In 1908, he graduated from the academy and was promoted to the rank of lieutenant. He had served during the First Balkan War, which took place from 1912 to 1913. In early 1913, Amirian was arrested by Bulgarian soldiers and thrown in prison. In mid-1913, after the signing of the Treaty of London, Amirian and countless other were released.

== World War I ==
In 1914–1915, Amirian served as General Andranik Ozanian's personal bodyguard and tutor. He was also a personal friend of famed General Drastamat Kanayan, also known as General Dro. On June 28, 1914, Gavrilo Princip assassinated the heir to the Austro-Hungarian Empire, Archduke Franz Ferdinand. Gavrilo Princip was part of the Black Hand, which was an organization that committed terrorist-like acts in order to secure the liberation of Bosnia-Herzegovina. One month later, World War I erupted in Europe. By 1915, the war reached the Ottoman Empire and triggered the Armenian genocide. Amirian was traumatically affected because of the massacre. The Amirian family was driven out of Bayburt and were forced to march until they reached their deaths. As the Amirian family and thousands of other Armenian reached Erzincan, Amirian's mother, Vartanoush had committed suicide by jumping into the Tigris river. The rest of the family, which consisted of 50 members, marched throughout the Ottoman Empire until all of them had perished. The only surviving member of the Amirian family was Haiganoush, Krikor Amirian's oldest sister. Haiganoush was able to escape before the Ottoman soldiers had reached Bayburt.

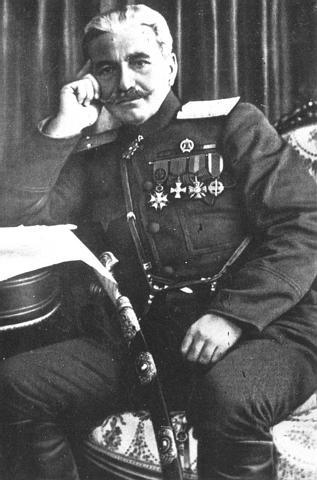
General Andranik Ozanian was one of Amirian's commanding officers, yet both would frequently argue about battle plans.

On April 17, 1916, Russian General V. P. Lyakhov led a massive assault on Bayburt, in order to drive out the Turkish and German soldiers stationed in the city, in which he succeeded. In the meantime, Amirian served in the First Armenian Volunteer Regiment. The First Armenian Volunteer Regiment fought battles throughout the border regions of Russia, Persia, and Turkey. The First Armenian Volunteer Regiment consisted of 1,200 men. Amirian was serving as the commander of the artillery division. He served under the command of General's Tovmas Nazarbekian, Drastamat Kanayan, and Andranik Ozanian. After the abdication of Tsar Nicholas II and signing of the Treaty of Brest-Litovsk, the First Armenian Regiment had been dissolved. The reason for all of this was that the Armenian forces was being supplied by the Russian Empire and after the signing of the Treaty of Brest-Litovsk, the Russian Empire was officially out of the war and all the supplies to the First Armenian Volunteer Regiment had collapsed. Though supplies to the Armenians from Russia had been dissolved, Amirian and the First Armenian Volunteer Regiment continued their cause without Russian support and instead relied heavily on supplies from the British Empire.

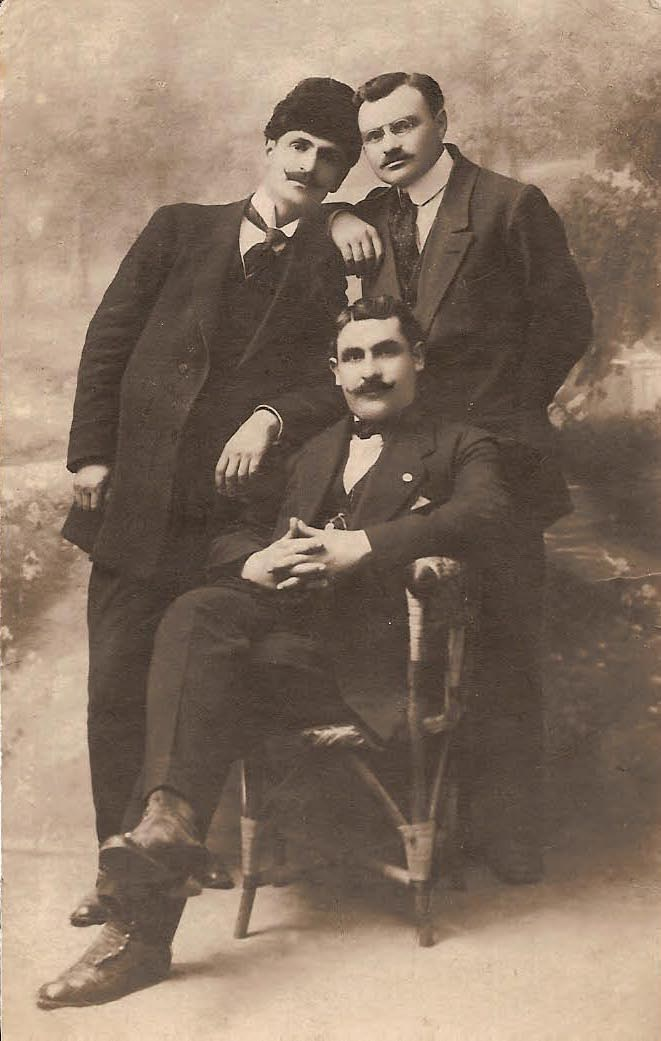
Krikor Amirian, standing on the right side with glasses, with personal friends in Sucrati.

=== Post World War I ===
After the end of World War I in 1918, Amirian returned to Sucrati, an Armenian neighborhood in Istanbul, where he served as a Director of an Armenian Orphanage that was housed in a Turkish Palace. In the early 1920s, Amirian and General Dro both fled to Romania. Dro was placed in charge of the Ghoukasian Oil Refineries and Amirian was appointed as a Management Officer. The Ghouaskasian Oil Refineries, also known as the Lumina Oil Refineries, had ranged all over Ploiești. In 1923, General Dro had introduced Amirian to a young Armenian-Bulgarian girl by the name of Siranoush Garabedian. Later that year, Amirian and Siranoush would be married. A year later, Amirian's first child was born, Christine. Two sons followed, Sebouh in 1925 and Dro in 1928. He had also lived with his older sibling, Haiganoush and his niece Alene. Haiganoush was George Mardikian's mother and Alene was his youngest sister. George Mardikian was a famous Armenian Philanthropist. In 1951, President Harry Truman had awarded George Mardikian the Medal of Freedom for supplying food to Coalition forces and civilians during World War II and the Korean War. He also was responsible for the migration of over 5,000 Armenian's from German refugee camps to the United States after World War II. In 1938, he had opened his own restaurant called Omar Khayyam. In 1935, Haiganoush and her daughter Alene fled to the United States. A year later, Haiganoush would die from pneumonia.

== World War II ==
During World War II, Amirian and his family dealt with Nazi occupation of the oil fields. All the men who ran the oil refineries were against the Nazi Regime, including Amirian. They were forced to supply the armies of Nazi General's Erwin Rommel, Friedrich Paulus, Hans-Jürgen Bernhard Theodor von Arnim, and Albert Kesselring with basic supplies, such as oil, gas, food, and water. The oil refineries also supplied the armies of the infamous Romanian Dictator Ion Antonescu. They also had to supply the German and Romanian forces during the Battle of Stalingrad. German Chancellor Adolf Hitler had received over 80% of his oil and gas supplies from Ploiești. Because of the major importance the Ghoukasian Oil Refineries and the other surrounding oil refineries had on the war, American President Franklin D. Roosevelt and British Prime Minister Winston Churchill worked with General Jacob E. Smart at the 1942 Casablanca Conference to discuss Operation Tidal Wave. Operation Tidal Wave was a massive air bombing of the Ploiești refineries by British and American Forces. Prime Minister Churchill called the Ploiești refineries as "the taproot of German might,".The Operation left complete and utter destruction in Ploiești. During the day 200 British bombers raided the city and at night 178 American bombers would arrive. Close to 100 bombers would not return home. On the other hand, Amirian and his management team had to deal with the massive devastation after 40% of the fields were destroyed. After relentless bombardment from the Allied Forces, Hitler would turn his attention to the refineries in Baku.

Yet, the German's were able to rebuild the refineries. In a desperate attempt to destroy the heart of the German war machine, the Royal Air Force deployed 700 bombers to flatten the city. The British Empire had succeeded in finally destroying the refineries.

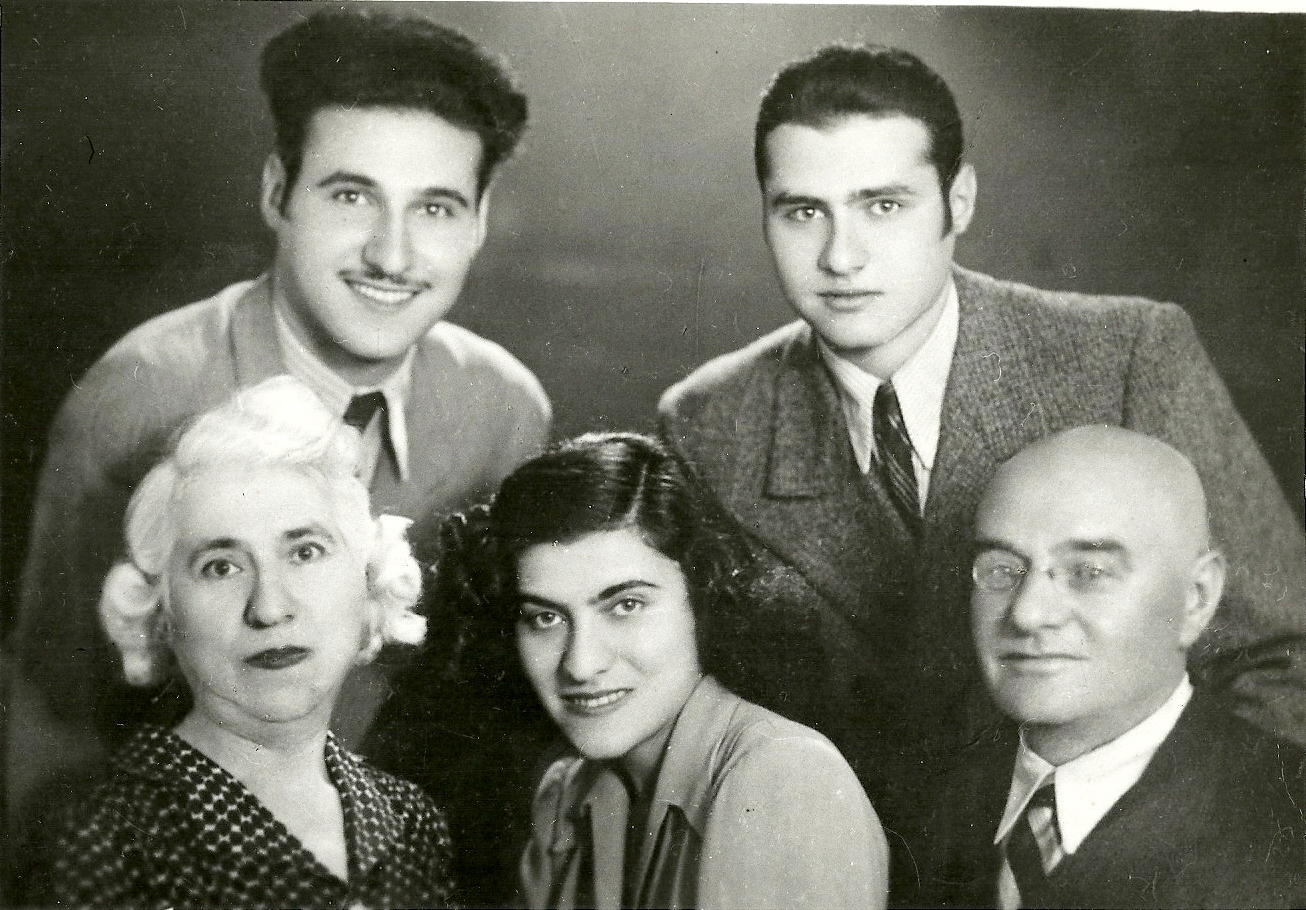
The Amirian Family in 1945. Top Row: Sebouh and Dro, Bottom Row: Siranoush, Christine, and Krikor.

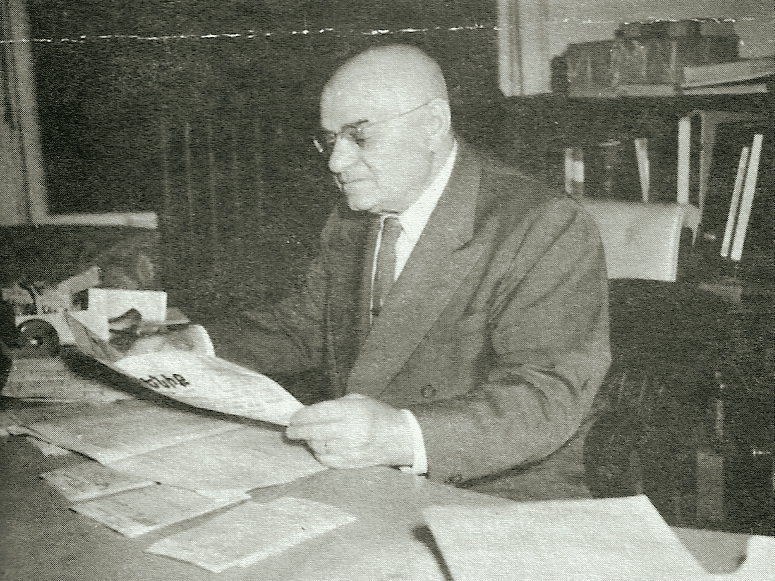
Krikor Amirian in his office at George Mardikian Enterprises in 1957.

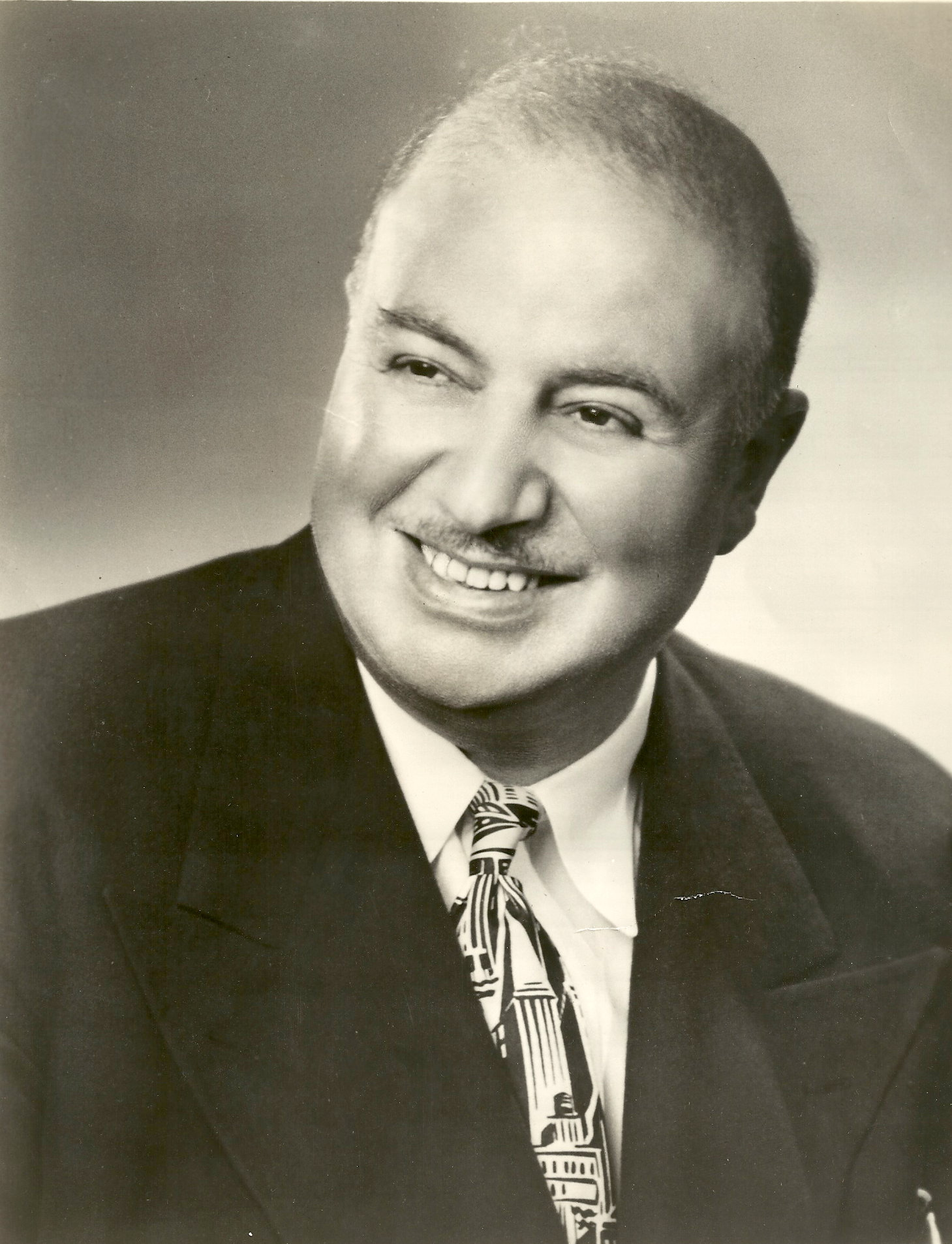
Mardikian had always said how he had worshiped Amirian.

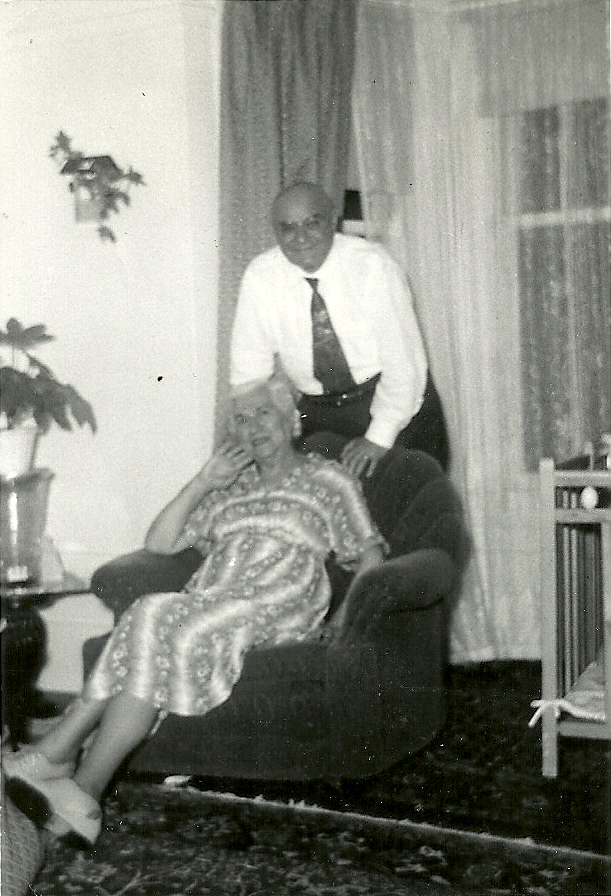
Amirian and his wife Siranoush. This picture was taken in 1960, four years before Amirian's death

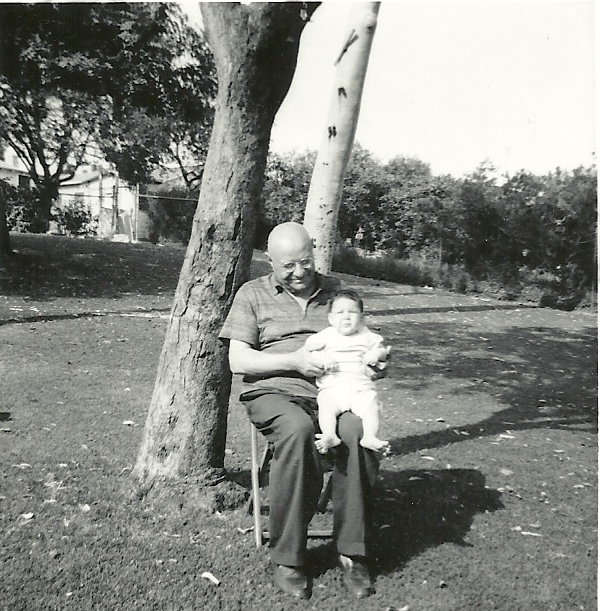
Amirian in front of Sebouh's home with his second grandchild, Christine. Sebouh is Amirian's second child.

This event took place a couple of days before the Second Jassy–Kishinev Offensive, which was put into effect on August 20, 1944. The purpose of the operation was to liberate Romania from Nazi Occupation and overthrown the Dictatorship of Ion Antonescu. On August 23, as Soviet Troops were at the gates of Bucharest, the puppet government of His Majesty Michael I of Romania had overthrown and arrested Antonescu. On August 24, Romania, which included the Ghoukasian Oil Refineries, were liberated. It would not be until December 22, 1989, when Romania finally gained freedom from the Soviet Union.

In 1941, General Dro had to leave the Ghoukasian Oil Refinery in order to create the Armenian Legion in the Wehrmacht. The Armenian Legion was a branch in the Wehrmacht that consisted mostly of former Armenian Prisoners of War. They had fought for the restoration of Armenia from the Soviet Union. When Dro had left to create the Armenian Legion, he gave command of the Ghoukasian Oil Refineries to Amirian and Alexander Sharafian.

=== Post World War II ===
After the end of the war, Amirian and his family escaped to Austria and finally to Italy. When he arrived in Rome, he was reunited with his nephew George Mardikian. Amirian finally arrived in the United States in 1950, with his wife Siranoush and youngest child Dro. His two other children, Christine and Sebouh, had to wait five years until the first Displaced Person Act was finally passed and until the United States accepted their passports. Amirian finally gained his United States citizenship on May 7, 1957.

== Later life ==
Amirian still continued his dedicated work in the Armenian community and the Armenian Revolutionary Federation, especially through his nephew, George Mardikian. He worked at George Mardikian's restaurant Omar Khayyam and also worked at George Mardikian Enterprises along with the famed Soghomon Tehlirian. Soghomon Tehlirian was a famous Armenian revolutionary who responsible for the assassination of the former Grand Vizier of the Ottoman Empire, Mehmed Talat Pasha. Tehlirian was acquitted by a German Court for the assassination on the charges of mental insanity. Amirian served as the official Armenian typist at George Mardikian Enterprises.

Amirian's three children also worked at Omar Khayyam's. In 1957, Amirian had retired from George Mardikian Enterprises and moved with his family to Los Angeles. Amirian lived the rest of his days spending time with his three children and his six grandchildren. He wrote hundreds of articles to Armenian Newspaper's across the country. Krikor Amirian died on August 1, 1964.

=== References ===
His works for the Armenian community can be found in his autobiography Memories, Armenian Prime Minister Simon Vratsian's book Along Life's Pathways; Antranig Chalabian's book DRO; George Mardikian's autobiography Song Of America; Manuk Krzulian's article Dro, The Immortal Soldier of the Armenian Liberation Struggle; and Together We Go by Misag Torlakian. Amirian is survived by two of his three children, six grandchildren, and eleven great-grandchildren. Amirian shall always be remembered as a dedicated Armenian who had fought for the Armenian cause.

== Gallery ==
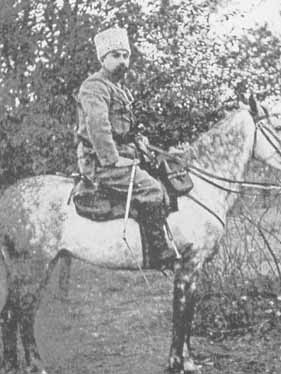
General Drastamat Kanayan was also one of Amirian's commanding officer and his closest friend throughout his military and social career.

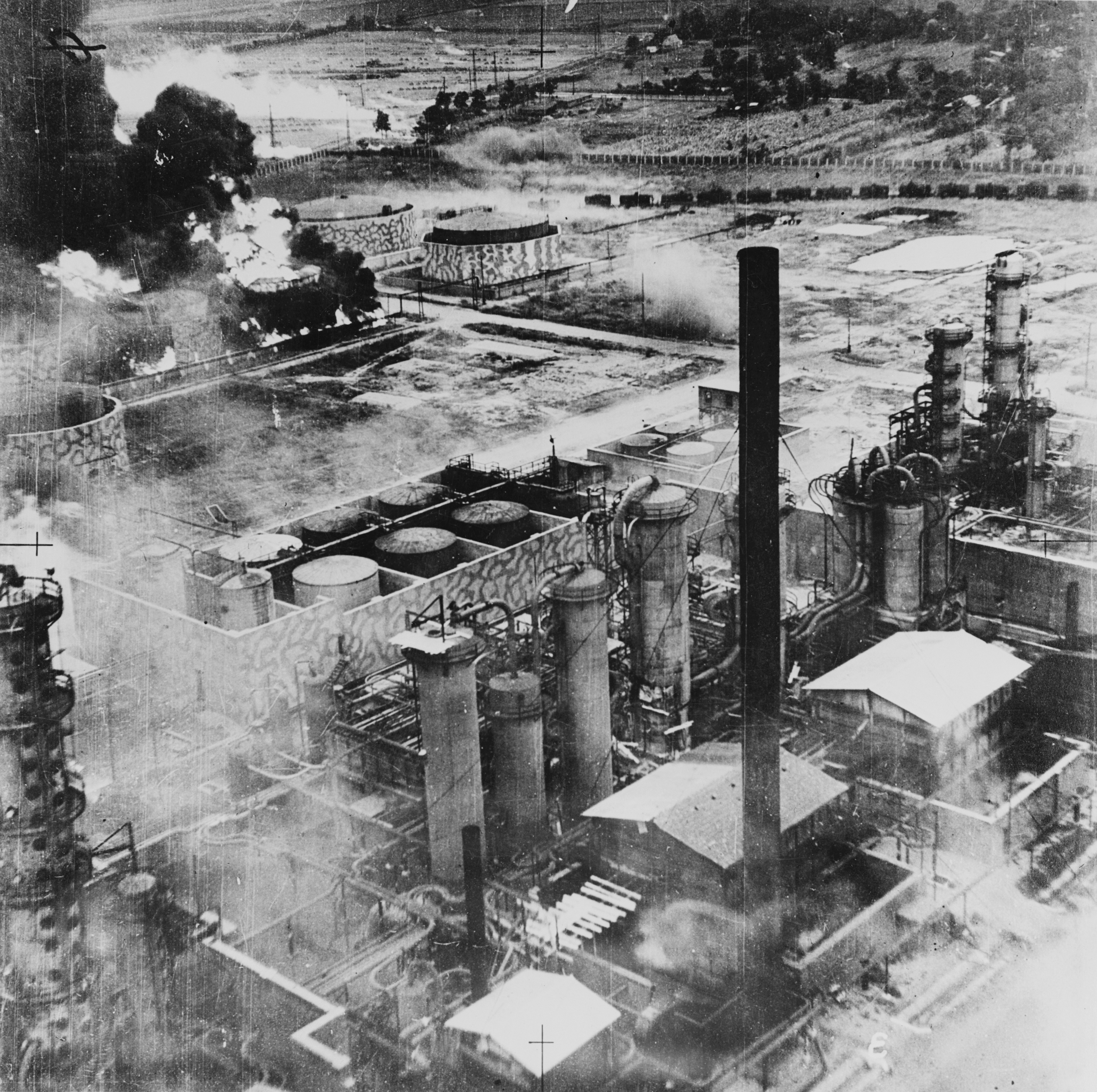
Amirian had dealt with the bombing of the Ghoukasian Oil Refineries by British and American Forces.

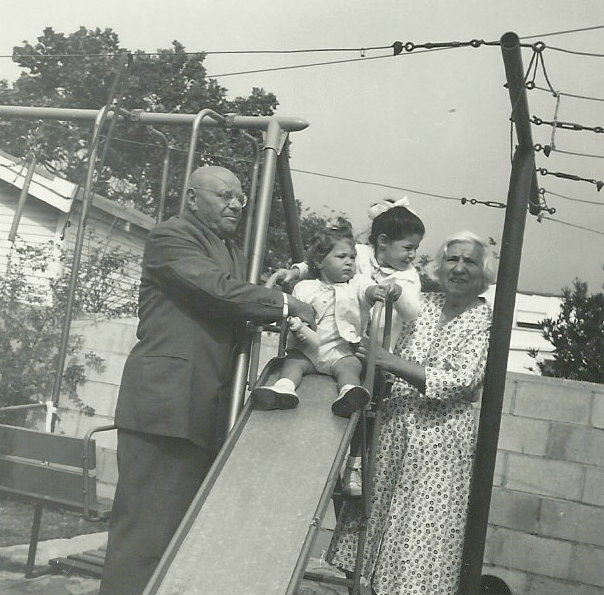
Amirian and his wife Siranoush with two of his grandchildren, Christine and Louisa. This picture was taken a couple of months before Amirian's death in mid-1964.

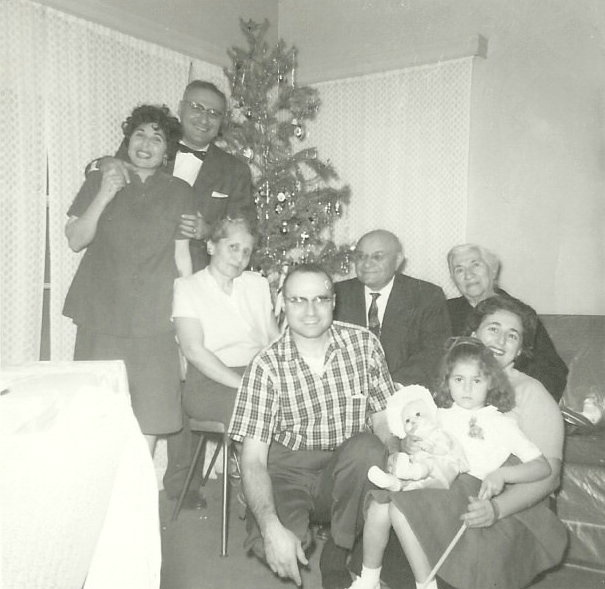
The Amirian Family celebrating Armenian Christmas on January 6, 1960.

== See also ==
- Caucasus Campaign
- Armenian genocide
- Armenian Volunteer Units
- George Mardikian
