= KSFN =

Radio station in Piedmont, California

- Piedmont, California; United States
- Broadcast area: San Francisco Bay Area
- Frequency: 1510 kHz
- Branding: 99.3 FM y 1510 AM Radio Lazer

Programming
- Format: Regional Mexican
- Affiliations: Las Vegas Raiders Spanish Radio Network; San Francisco Giants Spanish Radio Network

Ownership
- Owner: Lazer Media; (Lazer Licenses, LLC)
- Sister stations: KXZM

History
- First air date: June 4, 1947
- Former call signs: KTIM (1947–1988, 2002–2003); KCAF (1988–1989); KTID (1989–1990, 1992–1994); KAPX (1990–1992); KKHI (1994–1995, 1997–1998); KNOB (1995–97); KJQI (1998–2000, 2001–2002); KMZT (2000–2001, 2003–2005); KJAZ (2002); KPIG (2005–2010)
- Call sign meaning: San Francisco

Technical information
- Licensing authority: FCC
- Facility ID: 40137
- Class: B
- Power: 8,000 watts (day); 2,400 watts (night)
- Transmitter coordinates: 37°49′1.7″N 122°17′13.9″W
- Translator: 99.3 K257GE (San Francisco)

Links
- Public license information: Public file; LMS
- Webcast: Listen live
- Website: radiolazer.com/san-francisco

KSFN (1510 AM) is a commercial radio station broadcasting a Spanish Regional Mexican format. Licensed to Piedmont, California, United States, the station serves the San Francisco Bay Area. The station is currently owned by Alfredo Plascencia's Lazer Media, through licensee Lazer Licenses, LLC. KSFN's transmitter is in an industrial section of West Oakland, California; the station is also relayed over low-power FM translator (K257GE) in San Francisco.

== History ==
The station was first licensed June 4, 1947, to San Rafael, California, with its transmitter in Kentfield, California, and was owned by Marin Broadcasting Co. The station was originally licensed to broadcast 1,000 watts during daytime hours only. In the station's early years, it aired a full service format, with an hour of jazz weekday afternoons. By 1957, the station aired popular music from the 1930s and 1940s, and an hour of classical music in the morning and afternoon, along with local news and other local programming. The station's transmitter was moved to San Rafael, California in 1960.

In 1961, the station began to be simulcast on 100.9 KTIM-FM. In the mid 1970s, the station switched from a MOR format to an album-oriented rock format. The album-oriented rock format continued through the rest of the 1970s and into the early 1980s. In 1980, the station was sold to Platt Communications. The station would end its simulcast with KTIM-FM, and in 1982, the station began airing a big band format. In 1983 the station was sold to Arthur Astor.

In 1988, the station's call sign was changed to KCAF, and the station adopted a country music format as "Calf Country". In 1989, the station's call sign was changed to KTID. In 1990, the station's call sign was changed to KAPX, and the station adopted an adult standards format. In 1992, the station's call sign was changed to KTID, and the station simulcast the adult contemporary programming of its sister station KTID-FM.

In 1993, the station was bought by Mount Wilson FM Broadcasters Inc. In Spring 1994, KTID (AM) ended its simulcast of adult contemporary KTID-FM and began airing Mt. Wilson FM Broadcasters syndicated adult standards format. On October 12, 1994, the station's call sign was changed to KKHI. As KKHI, it simulcasted the classical programming of KKHI-FM 100.9. In April 1995, the station began broadcasting Big Band Jazz, as KNOB. This occurred after America's last commercial jazz station KJAZ stopped broadcasting in August of the previous year. On February 16, 1997, the station's call sign was changed to KKHI, and the station again simulcast the classical music programming of KKHI-FM.

On December 5, 1998, the station's call sign was changed to KJQI, and the station began airing an adult standards format as "the Joy of San Francisco". On February 28, 2000, the station's call sign was changed to KMZT, and the station aired a classical music format as K-Mozart. On March 19, 2001, the station's call sign was changed to KJQI, and the station aired a Christian format as "K-Joy". On March 25, 2002, the station's call sign was changed to KJAZ, and on August 15, 2002, the station's call sign was changed to KTIM. As KTIM the station aired a country music format. On June 28, 2003, the station's call sign was changed to KMZT, and the station again aired a classical music format as K-Mozart.

In 2003, Mt. Wilson Broadcasters moved the transmitter from Marin to Oakland so as to improve its signal into San Francisco. The station is unique in that its entire directional antenna array is located on the rooftop of a large warehouse. By 2005, the station was airing an oldies format.

In 2005, Mapleton Communications purchased the station for $5.1 million, and began simulcasting the programming of KPIG-FM Santa Cruz on the station on July 1, 2005. KPIG-FM carried a progressive rock and alternative country format. AM 1510's call sign was changed to KPIG on August 4, 2005.

To help KPIG, Mapleton purchased co-channel KGA in Spokane, a 50,000–watt Class A station. In 2008, Mapleton reduced the nighttime power of KGA to afford KSFN more power at night to better cover the Bay Area. KGA kept its 50,000 watt daytime signal but dropped its nighttime power to 15,000 watts. Additionally, and simultaneously, KGA was reduced in class from Class A to Class B. Subsequently, KGA eliminated its directional antenna system, and further reduced its nighttime power to 540 watts.

On August 25, 2010, AM 1510's call sign was changed to KSFN. The station adopted a Chinese language format, targeting the Bay Area Chinese and Taiwanese communities. In 2019, Mapleton agreed to sell KSFN to Lazer Broadcasting. In anticipation of the sale, it switched KSFN to a Regional Mexican music format. Lazer specializes in Spanish-language formats. The sale to Lazer Broadcasting, at a price of $200,000, was consummated on December 31, 2019. It marked the exit of Mapleton from the radio business, as it was the final sale from their portfolio of stations.

Logo before translator sign on

On February 3, 2020, KSFN changed their format from Regional Mexican to Spanish Sports, with programming from Unanimo Deportes Radio. In late 2020, Lazer dropped the Unanimo Deportes Radio Network and flipped back to Regional Mexican as "Radio Lazer".
