= Radio Romántica =

Radio station brand

Radio Romántica is a name used by EXCL Communications (now Entravision) for various Spanish-language radio stations from the 1990s through 2005. The earliest known reference to Radio Romántica is from 1997, at the time when EXCL moved KBRG from 104.9 to 100.3 in San Jose, California during a frequency swap deal from American Radio Systems. Later, EXCL's Radio Romántica Spanish AC format was adapted to KJMN in Denver, Colorado, KRZY-FM in Albuquerque, New Mexico, an unknown Salinas station, and another unknown station using the name.

Entravision acquired the Radio Romántica name and stations following its purchase of EXCL Communications in 2000. The name was subsequently used on several of Entravision's other stations, including KLOB in Palm Springs, California, KRRE in Sacramento, California, KCVR in Modesto, California, KVVA/KDVA in Phoenix, Arizona, and KRVA in Dallas, Texas. In 2003, Entravision began phasing out the Radio Romántica format in favor of Super Estrella. Edgar Pineda who was the Program Director between March 2001 and December 2004 also made the transition to Super Estrella leaving only KBRG under Radio Romántica format and the Aracelys Rivera's Direction. By the end of 2005, KBRG was the only station still using the Radio Romántica name.

Some of the Announcers that were part of Radio Romántica are Aracelys Rivera, Pedro Biaggi, Carlos Hernández, Paúl Camacho, Juan Fernando, Carlos Rivera, Jorge Cardona, and Ricardo Rendón.

Radio Romántica ceased to exist on January 1, 2006, when KBRG was acquired by Univision Radio Network and switched to Spanish oldies as Recuerdo 100.3. Coincidentally, KBRG's original frequency, 104.9 (used before 1998), flipped to Spanish at the same time that 100.3 became Recuerdo. KCNL 104.9, owned by Clear Channel, briefly renamed itself La Romántica 104.9 before it assumed a different name, Enamorada 104.9, in February 2006.

Radio Romántica returned in 2023, exclusively on Entravision's El Boton app online.
