= EXCL Communications =

American radio broadcasting company

EXCL Communications was a Spanish-language broadcasting company founded in 1989 by Athena and Christopher Marks. It acquired its first stations, San Jose, California's KBRG and KLOK from brothers Danny Villanueva and James Villanueva (Radio América, Inc) in 1989. After its purchase of Embarcadero Media in 1997, it owned and operated 18 radio stations (many of which used the Radio Romántica format), making it one of the largest Spanish language media groups in the United States. EXCL was a division of Latin Communications Group from March 1996 until April 20, 2000, when Latin Communications Group was purchased by Entravision.
