= KSJX =

- San Jose, California; United States
- Broadcast area: San Francisco Bay Area
- Frequency: 1500 kHz
- Branding: Little Saigon Radio

Programming
- Language: Vietnamese

Ownership
- Owner: Multicultural Broadcasting; (Multicultural Radio Broadcasting Licensee, LLC)
- Sister stations: KEST, KIQI

History
- First air date: June 24, 1948; 77 years ago
- Former call signs: KXRX (1948–1982); KHTT (1982–1989)

Technical information
- Licensing authority: FCC
- Facility ID: 4118
- Class: B
- Power: 10,000 watts day 5,000 watts night
- Transmitter coordinates: 37°21′27.8″N 121°52′20.8″W

Links
- Public license information: Public file; LMS
- Webcast: Listen live
- Website: ksjx1500.com

KSJX (1500 AM) is a broadcast radio station in the United States. Licensed to San Jose, California, the station broadcasts programming in Vietnamese. It has been owned by Multicultural Broadcasting since 1998.

Founded in 1948 with the call signs KXRX, the station had various music formats in its early decades. The station was locally owned for most of its first 50 years of operation except 1978 to 1991. In the 1970s, KXRX expanded its programming to include news. From 1972 to 1980 and 1987 to 1991, the station was the radio home for San Jose State University sports. After an ownership change, KXRX became KHTT in 1982 and changed its music playlist from middle of the road to current hits. In 1986, KHTT switched to oldies.

KSJX has had its current call sign since 1989, when it launched a business news format. In 1992, KSJX began broadcasting in Vietnamese. Multicultural Broadcasting bought KSJX in 1998.

== History ==
=== As KXRX (1948–1982) ===
AM 1500 signed on the air June 24, 1948 with the call letters KXRX and 1,000 watts of power, founded by the San Jose Broadcasting Company. In 1949, KXRX was part of the San Francisco 49ers radio network. KXRX played exclusively pop LPs by late 1957. From 1956 to 1958, KXRX had daytime power of 10,000 watts before reverting to 1,000; the daytime power again was upgraded in 1960, this time to 5,000 watts. In 1964, KXRX boosted its power to 10,000 watts in daytime and 5,000 watts at night, where it remains today.

KXRX broadcast programming related to San Jose State College (later University) throughout the 1960s and 1970s. In 1960, KXRX debuted Spartan Salute, a nightly, hour-long program featuring news reports, interviews, and music targeted towards San Jose State students. Beginning in the fall of 1966, KXRX broadcast Spartan Spectrum, a nightly news summary produced by the San Jose State radio/television news department that aired 10 minutes before 8 p.m. In 1972, KXRX began broadcasting San Jose State Spartans football games.

As of 1973, KXRX had a news format. By 1974, KXRX broadcast live, locally produced news in mornings from 5:30 to 9:15 a.m. and afternoons from 4 to 6:15 p.m., with oldies the rest of the day. By the late 1970s, KXRX broadcast The Wall Street Journal Business Report, a syndicated business news show.

San Jose Broadcasting sold KXRX in 1978 to the Seattle-based Sterling Recreation Organization, a company with holdings in movie theaters and bowling alleys in addition to radio stations. With new ownership came programming changes. Following the 1979 season, KXRX lost San Jose State football broadcasting rights to San Francisco's KCBS. Although KXRX offered $1,000 more for the 1980 season, KCBS out-bid KXRX with a contract that rose by $2,000 per year. San Jose State men's athletic director Dave Adams also cited KCBS having a far stronger signal and ratings. In 1981, KXRX switched to a middle of the road music format.

=== As KHTT (1982–1989) ===
On September 7, 1982, KXRX changed its call sign to KHTT. With a new "K-Hit" brand, the format switched to current hits.

Sterling Recreation sold KHTT on July 10, 1985 to Narragansett Broadcasting Company based in Providence, Rhode Island. Citing low ratings and competition from FM stations, Narragansett switched KHTT's format in October 1985 from current hits to 1960s oldies.

KHTT began carrying Santa Clara University and San Jose State University men's basketball games in the 1985–86 season. However, lack of advertising caused an initial broadcast rights deal with Southern California company ROWW Enterprises to be cancelled, so only by December 1985 could KHTT secure a deal with San Jose State to broadcast basketball games; it was the first time since 1983 that San Jose State basketball was broadcast on commercial radio. Ken Korach, who would later become the Oakland A's radio play-by-play announcer, was San Jose State's announcer at the time. In November 1986, local printing business owner and San Jose State alum Jerry Erich financed a new contract for both San Jose State and Santa Clara basketball for KHTT as negotiations were breaking down.

In 1987, KHTT won the rights to live San Jose State football broadcasts after the contract of San Francisco station KCBS expired; for the 1986 season, KCBS carried most games on tape delay due to conflicts with Stanford games. After delays due to a possible sale of the station, KHTT signed a new contract with San Jose State to broadcast all football and basketball games in June 1988.

=== As KSJX (1989–present) ===
On March 1, 1989, the station picked up its current call letters KSJX and a business news format. That format lasted only around one year before KSJX became a simulcast of FM sister station KSJO, an album-oriented rock station, in 1990.

In March 1991, KSJX dropped the simulcast of KSJO for its own modern rock format branded "X-Rock 1500". The following month, KSJX lost the San Jose State sports broadcast rights to rival station KLIV, due to KSJX carrying only 20 of the previous season's 27 basketball games. KSJX returned to local ownership for the first time since the late 1970s in November 1991, when Narragansett Broadcasting sold the station to Baycom San Jose.

KSJX began its current Vietnamese format in 1992. Douglas Broadcasting, based in nearby Palo Alto, bought KSJX for $2.1 million in February 1995. In January 1998, Douglas Broadcasting sold KSJX and San Francisco-based KEST to New York City-based Multicultural Broadcasting.

In March 1999, KSJX began carrying a Sunday night LGBT talk show Sống Thật hosted by Vuong Nguyen. A 2003 San Jose Mercury News profile described the show as "intentionally aimed at educating the older and more conservative generation of immigrants who are probably the most averse to hearing the show." Nguyen and her radio program have won local awards.

On October 9, 2010, a grass fire burned KSJX's offices and transmitter; Spanish-language KZSF also shared the transmitter that burned. Prior to the fire, KSJX operated from offices on Wooster Avenue near an Eggo factory and U.S. Route 101 in central San Jose; the station moved to Murphy Avenue in North San Jose as of 2012. Until the transmitter was rebuilt, KSJX broadcast under a special temporary authority from October 18, 2010, to November 22, 2013.

== Technical information ==
KSJX broadcasts with daytime power of 10 kilowatts and nighttime power of 5 kilowatts from a directional antenna in central San Jose, near U.S. Route 101, Coyote Creek, and an Eggo factory. The KSJX studios are also located in central San Jose.
