= KXZM =

Radio station in Felton, California

- Felton, California; United States
- Broadcast area: Santa Clara Valley
- Frequency: 93.7 MHz
- Branding: Radio Lazer 93.7 FM

Programming
- Format: Regional Mexican
- Affiliations: San Francisco Giants Spanish Radio Network

Ownership
- Owner: Lazer Media; (Lazer Licenses, LLC)
- Sister stations: KSFN

History
- First air date: August 6, 1993
- Former call signs: KAEA (1993); KHIP (1993–2002); KTEE (2002–2005)

Technical information
- Licensing authority: FCC
- Facility ID: 4698
- Class: B1
- ERP: 410 watts
- HAAT: 690 meters (2,260 ft)
- Transmitter coordinates: 37°09′35″N 121°54′32″W

Links
- Public license information: Public file; LMS
- Webcast: Listen live
- Website: radiolazer.com/index.php/san-jose

KXZM (93.7 FM) is a radio station broadcasting a Regional Mexican format as part of the Radio Lazer brand. It is licensed to Felton, California, United States, and it serves the San Jose area. The station is owned by Lazer Media. In the spring of 2012, KXZM expanded its signal by moving its transmitter from near Felton to near San Jose.

KXZM broadcasts some San Francisco Giants games.
