= KLOK (AM) =

South Asian radio station in San Jose, California

- San Jose, California; United States
- Broadcast area: San Francisco Bay Area
- Frequency: 1170 kHz
- Branding: Punjabi Radio USA 1170 AM

Programming
- Format: Punjabi language talk and Punjabi music

Ownership
- Owner: Punjabi Radio USA Inc.; (Punjabi American Media, LLC)
- Sister stations: KIID

History
- First air date: October 13, 1946
- Call sign meaning: "Clock"

Technical information
- Licensing authority: FCC
- Facility ID: 41339
- Class: B
- Power: 50,000 watts day 9,000 watts night
- Transmitter coordinates: 37°21′27.8″N 121°52′20.8″W
- Translators: 99.3 K257BE (Los Gatos, Etc.)

Links
- Public license information: Public file; LMS
- Website: punjabiradiousa.com

KLOK (1170 kHz "Punjabi Radio USA 1170 AM") is a commercial AM radio station based in San Jose, California, that broadcasts Punjabi-language talk shows and music. It serves the San Francisco Bay Area and has focused on programming for the South Asian community since June 2009.

By day, KLOK is powered at 50,000 watts, the maximum for American AM stations. At night, it reduces power to 9,000 watts. It uses a directional antenna all day, helping it cover most of the Bay Area.

== History ==
E.L. Barker founded KLOK and began broadcasting on October 13, 1946. Initially, the station broadcast with a 5,000-watt daytime signal, later adding a 1,000-watt nighttime signal in 1952. The power increased to 10,000 watts in the daytime and 5,000 watts in the night time on June 29, 1964. Mr. Barker sold KLOK Radio to Davis Broadcasting (which later became the Weaver Davis Fowler Corporation) in 1967. On August 10, 1969, KLOK increased the daytime power to its current 50,000 watts. These historical dates were memorialized on a plaque near the entrance of the station's former studios and transmitter site on South King Road in San Jose.

In the late 1960s and 1970s, the station broadcast "oldies" pop music, eventually switching to Adult Contemporary. By the early 1980s, KLOK's parent company also owned KLOK-FM (San Francisco), KWIZ (Santa Ana), and KFIG (Fresno). According to Ad Week, all five stations eventually shared the same stunt format, a "Yes/No Radio" format, which was developed by KLOK Executive VP and GM, Bill Weaver. This allowed the station to leverage branding, advertising, and jingles by JAM Creative Productions until August 1988. In this format, listeners would respond to the "KLOK Yes/No Music Poll" by calling into the station and voting "Yes" if they would like the song added to the playlist or "No" to have a certain song removed from the playlist. The last song played on KLOK as an Adult Contemporary station was "When Will I See You Again" by The Three Degrees.

KLOK became a Spanish-language station on August 9, 1988. KLOK was purchased by brothers Danny Villanueva and James Villanueva, owners of Radio América, Inc., Bahia Radio, and KBRG 104.9, as the Spanish-language music talk format "KLOK Radio Reloj." The first song played on Radio Reloj was Argentine singer, Ricardo Ceratto's "El Sol Nace Para Todos." In 1989, EXCL Communications bought KLOK and KBRG from Radio América, Inc. and flipped to a Regional Mexican format under the name "KLOK Con la Música de México" and later Tricolor. In 2000, Entravision acquired both KLOK and KBRG from EXCL. The station flipped to Cumbia 1170 AM format, now consisting of Cumbia music. On January 1, 2006, Univision Radio Network purchased both KLOK and KBRG from Entravision and switched it to a Spanish Talk format, no longer consisting of any more music. The station maintained this format until 2009 when its sale by Univision Radio to Principle Broadcasting Network was followed by a change to a format billed as "New International Community Radio" and later "Desi 1170 AM" generally consisting of South Asian music.

On May 1, 2018, KLOK adopted the "Radio Zindagi" format, focusing on Indian talk and music after KZDG (1550 AM) discontinued the format. On July 4, 2021, KLOK began broadcasting under the "Mirchi" brand, catering to the South Asian audience in the Bay Area.

On January 24, 2023, Punjabi American Media's "Punjabi Radio USA" announced the acquisition of KLOK from Tron Dinh Do for US$2.85 million, with the sale completed on March 24, 2023.
