= Víctor Manuel Torres =

Mexican politician

- Born: 12 February 1958 (age 68); Martínez de la Torre, Veracruz, Mexico
- Occupation: Politician
- Political party: PAN

Víctor Manuel Torres Herrera (born 12 February 1958) is a Mexican politician affiliated with the National Action Party. As of 2014 he served as Senator of the LVIII and LIX Legislatures of the Mexican Congress representing Colima and as Deputy of the LVII Legislature.
