= Tim Bedore =

American comedian

Tim Bedore (born c. 1956) is an American comedian born in Chicago. His parents moved to Stevens Point, Wisconsin when he was a child. He attended Pacelli High School (Wisconsin) in Stevens Point and the Appleton High School-West, where he graduated.

Bedore is best known for his Vague But True comedy segments on PRI's Marketplace and the syndicated Bob & Tom Show. Bedore gained initial fame doing an afternoon drive radio show at KQAK San Francisco, where he interviewed comedians. He then started opening for the likes of Robin Williams. He currently does a podcast called "An Agnostic's Guide to Heaven," where he either helps people via life coach and spiritual guru advice or has fun with the idea.

After working for many years in the Los Angeles area, he recently moved to the Minneapolis-St. Paul area with his wife Karen and daughter Claire where he works from his home. Tim is a University of Wisconsin–Stevens Point graduate (cum laude).
