= George Mardikian =

Turkish chef

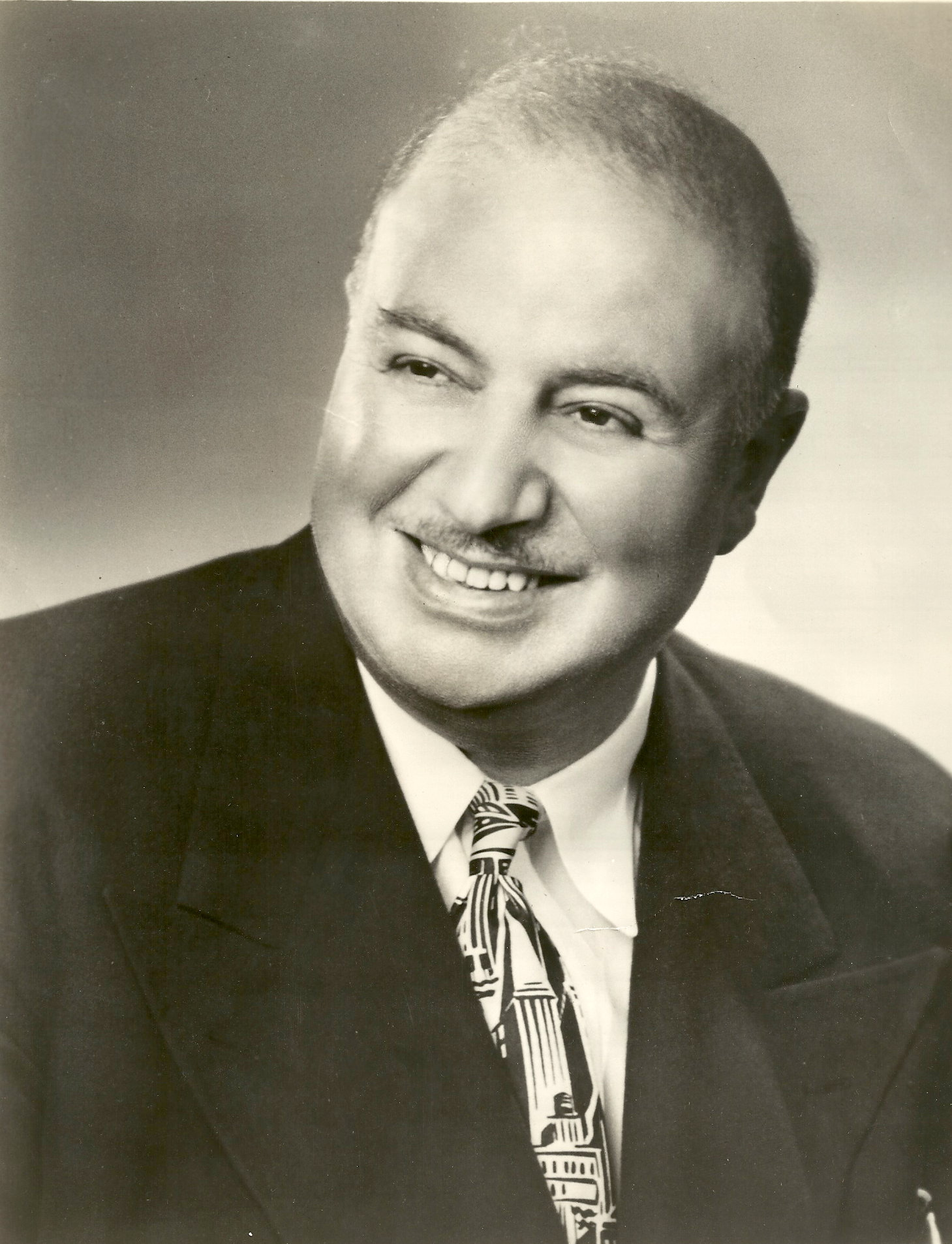

Personal details
- Born: George Magar Mardikian; November 7, 1903 Bayburt, Ottoman Empire (now Turkey)
- Died: October 23, 1977 (aged 73) San Francisco, California, U.S.
- Resting place: Ararat Cemetery
- Party: Republican Party (United States)
- Occupation: Restaurateur, chef, author
- Awards: Medal of Freedom

Military service
- Years of service: 1915–1920
- Rank: Private
- Unit: Armenian Volunteer Regiment
- Battles/wars: World War I World War II; Korean War

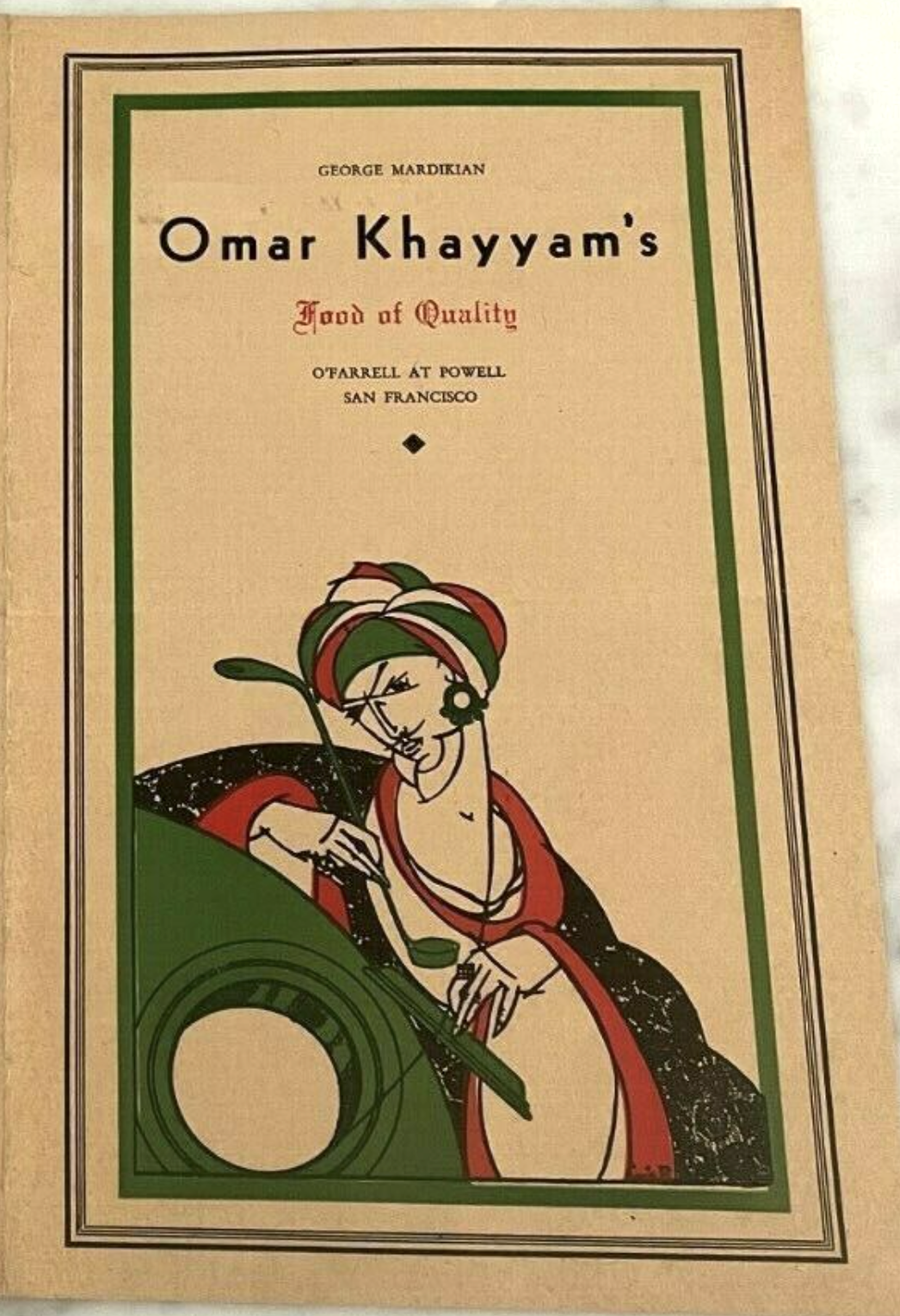
Menu cover for Omar Khayyam's

George Magar Mardikian (Armenian: Ջորջ Մարտիկյան) (November 7, 1903 – October 23, 1977) was an Armenian-American restaurateur, chef, author and philanthropist born in Turkey. In 1938, he opened Omar Khayyam's restaurant in San Francisco, California, which was open for more than 40 years. He was important in popularizing Armenian cuisine in the US. Mardikian was the founder of American National Committee To Aid Homeless Armenians (ANCHA). His uncle was Armenian revolutionary Krikor Amirian.

== Early life, family and education ==
Mardikian was born on November 7, 1903, in Bayburt, in what was then the Ottoman Empire (now Turkey), to Magar Mardikian and Haiganoush Amirian. Mardikian grew up in the city of Scutari, an Armenian community in Constantinople. Mardikian's paternal family was one of warriors—hence their family name: in Armenian, Mardik translates to warrior. His maternal family, the Amirians, was an influential and powerful family in Bayburt. Mardikian's mother also was the eldest sibling of his idol, Krikor Amirian.

As a child, Mardikian was visibly overweight and carried the nickname shisko (Turkish: "chubby"). Mardikian's father, Magar, was of one of the approximately 250 ethnic-Armenian intellectuals and community leaders arrested on April 24, 1915, known as Red Sunday. After his arrest, the Amirians were driven out of their homes and marched to Erzincan. Mardikian's maternal grandmother, Vartanoush Amirian, committed suicide by jumping in the Euphrates, while the rest of the Amirian family was either beaten to death or burned alive. Witnessing the massacre of his mother's side of his family, Mardikian wanted to avenge their deaths and prove to his mother that he was a true warrior. As a result of his ambition, Mardikian ran away from his home and joined the Armenian volunteer units, in which his uncle, Krikor Amirian, was a high-ranking member. After the First World War ended, Mardikian returned to his mother as a war hero.

In the summer of 1920, Mardikian worked with Captain Eddie Fox and George D. White of the Near East Relief organization to create an Armenian Boy Scout unit. It would be a short-lived accomplishment, since war broke out between the First Republic of Armenia, Turkey, and Russia. Mardikian called on his fellow youths to continue the fight for freedom. When he returned to the battlefield, he was quickly captured and imprisoned. Mardikian served his term in prison in a sauerkraut factory where the Turkish guards forced the Armenian prisoners to chop ice, even though it was a useless activity. After serving two years in prison, George D. White, whom Markidian had met a few years earlier, lied to the Turkish prison commandant that Mardikian was an American and demanded his freedom. Mardikian eventually gained his freedom and returned to his mother and his surviving family members in Scutari. His mother, Haiganoush, and uncle, Krikor, advised him that he must go to the United States like his older sister Baidzar. Within a few days, he left Scutari.

One hour after Mardikian's ship left the port of Scutari, Turkish police knocked on Haiganoush's door demanding that they reveal the location of her son. The reason for this was that Mardikian stated he was a Near East Relief worker, which led to his freedom from prison. Haiganoush stated that her son had left this world and had entered a new one. Nonetheless, the Turkish police ransacked the home and finally left, assuming that he had died.

== Arrival in the United States ==
Mardikian arrived at Ellis Island on July 24, 1922. He, like every other immigrant, went through all the steps in order to gain legal permission to enter the country. When he was able to take a shower, Mardikian stated, "I washed away the grime, I washed away the years. I washed away the Old World, I washed away all the hatred and injustice and cruelty I had known, all the hunger, all the weeping, all the pain". He later stated, "As I dried myself with the thick, heavy towel, and saw my clean skin and felt my blood tingle, it was as though I had been reborn, as though I were a completely new human being, a taller, a stronger, prouder man—an American". Since that day, Mardikian had said that July 24 is his birthday.

== Life in the United States ==
During his entire journey by train to San Francisco, he ate only potato salad, as that was all he could read in English. He vowed to one day open a restaurant of his own. After arriving in San Francisco, he found a job working as a dishwasher at Coffee Dan's and later at Clinton's Cafeteria. He was later appointed restaurant manager by Eugene Compton. In 1928, he was given United States citizenship. For the next two years he worked on a cook on a cruise ship, mastering cooking and learning more about Armenian food as well as international cuisines.

In 1930, he moved to Fresno, California, where he joined the vibrant Armenian immigrant community. Alongside his wife Nazenig, he opened a Fresno lunch counter called Omar Khayyam's, named after the famous Persian poet. Despite the ongoing Great Depression, customers filled his diner to enjoy his clam chowder, chili con carne, and pot roast. As he frequently noted, his dream was to teach Americans how to eat well.

He would later move his restaurant to two other large buildings in Fresno and then, in 1938, to San Francisco in the old Coffee Dan's building, where he earned praise from critics and locals alike.

In 1935, Mardikian arranged the arrival of his mother from Bucharest, Romania, where she lived with her brother, Krikor Amirian. Shortly after, in February 1936, Haiganoush contracted pneumonia while in surgery and died days later. She was eventually buried at Ararat Cemetery in Fresno.

== World War II ==
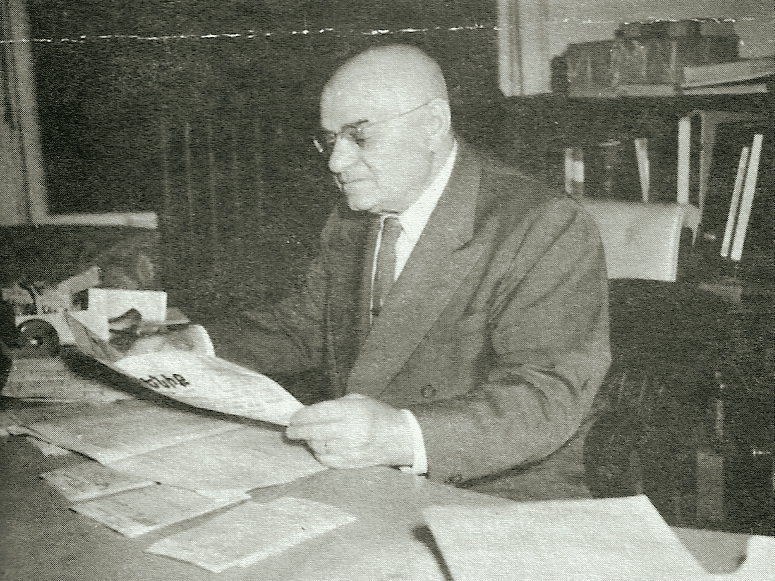
Mardikian wrote about Amirian stating, "We worshiped him then, and always would."

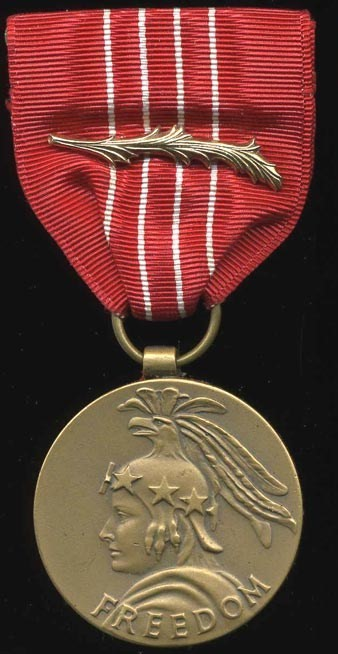
In 1951, President Truman awarded Mardikian the Medal of Freedom.

In 1942, Mardikian was appointed as a food consultant to the Quartermaster General of the United States Army, a position that he would hold until 1954. GIs everywhere are grateful to Mardikian for improving the quality of their meals. The Reader's Digest has conferred the title "Champion of G.I. Chow. Mardikian would receive presidential commendations for the drastic changes that he made to the United States military. In 1944, he published a cook book, Dinner at Omar Khayyam's, that was reprinted numerous times over the next two decades.

In 1945, he donated his services as caterer for the United Nations Conference on International Organization that was held in San Francisco and established the United Nations. Even though Mardikian had a comfortable life in the United States, he would periodically get depressed because he missed his uncle, Krikor Amirian.

After the end of World War II, Mardikian feared that his uncle may have been killed. He was finally able to locate him in late 1945. In order to ensure their reunification, Mardikian asked the local Allied general to shelter his uncle and family. Mardikian helped them to escape to Austria and then, finally, to Italy. His reunion with his uncle was emotional.

In addition to finding his long-lost family, Mardikian traveled the world trying to convince Armenians to move to the US. Over 5,000 Armenians immigrated to the United States because of his efforts.

Markidian was as a food consultant to the Quartermaster General of the US Army from 1942 to 1954. President Harry S. Truman awarded the Medal of Freedom for this work. A portion of the citation reads, "With vigorous energy, keen powers of observation and analysis and a dynamic personality, he enlisted the enthusiastic interest of commanders and soldiers alike in the preparation and service of food under varying conditions in the combat zone." Later that year, Mardikian would appoint his uncle as his chief Armenian typist and Soghomon Tehlirian as his assistant.

He would go on to write and contribute to entrepreneurial and philanthropic causes, including the founding of American National Committee to Aid Homeless Armenians (ANCHA).

== Omar Khayyam's restaurant ==
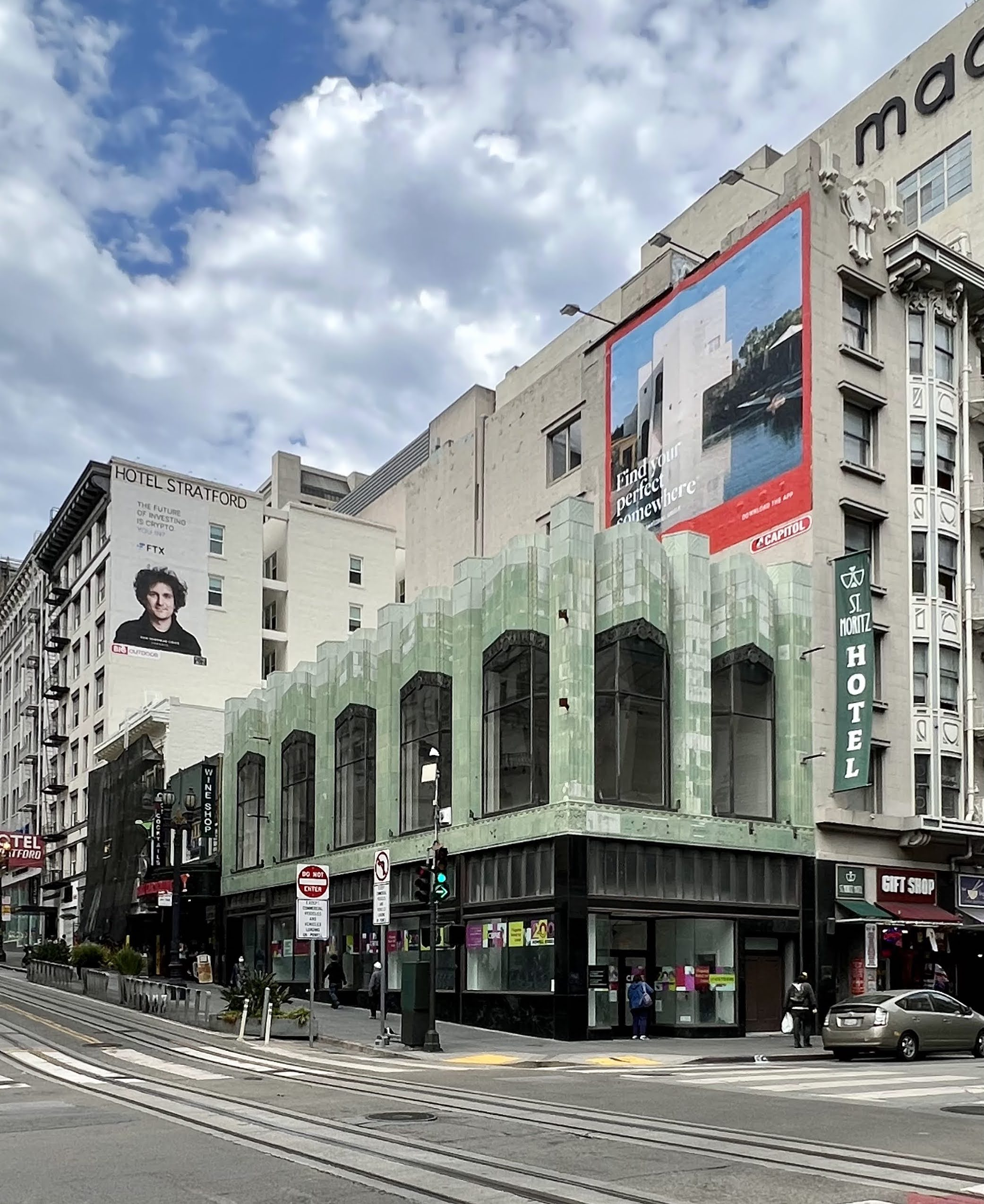
200 Powell Street, San Francisco, California (in 2022, the green building)

George Mardikian's restaurant, Omar Khayyam's, was located at 200 Powell Street in San Francisco in the basement of a building on the northeast corner of Powell Street and O'Farrell Street. The entrance was off O'Farrell Street. After passing photographs of Mardikian "breaking bread" with various notable people (including Dwight Eisenhower and Eleanor Roosevelt), diners would descend into the cavernous, sumptuously decorated restaurant below.

On the left at the bottom of the stairs was the Rubaiyat lounge with velvet banquettes, low Persian lamps, and a gleaming chrome cash register. Tables in the restaurant were contained in curtained chambers out of the Arabian Nights decorated with wall-hangings and inscriptions from The Rubaiyat of Omar Khayyam. Mardikian would customarily "break bread" (a special flat bread served at the restaurant) with his diners as a sign of hospitality. He used Armenian folk tales to sell items on his menu.

The menu was exotic (for the time), featuring a mix of Armenian, Middle Eastern, and African cooking adapted for American palates. Mardikian also made a point to emphasize the health benefits of his homemade yogurt, which at the time was not part of an American diet.

In 1980, a fire destroyed the restaurant.

== Later life ==
He was a guest star in the television show, This Is Your Life, which was broadcast May 5, 1954 with host Ralph Edwards. He supported Republican candidates all over the country. Due to his fame, he knew many famous people. In the 1950s, when Emperor Haile Selassie visited San Francisco, Mardikian visited him frequently, taking him boxes of Armenian halva.

In 1956, Mardikian published his memoirs, Song of America. An excerpt from the book is quoted on a wall plaque in the entrance hall to the American Adventure Pavilion at Disney's Epcot Center.

Mardikian died at age 73 on October 23, 1977.

== Publications ==
- Mardikian, George (1944). Dinner at Omar Khayyam's. New York City: The Viking Press.
- Mardikian, George M. (1956). Song of America: Fascinating Narrative of an Armenian Immigrant. New York City: McGraw-Hill Book Publishing, Inc.
