= Porky Freeman =

- Born: Quilla Hugh Freeman; June 29, 1916; Vera Cruz, Missouri, United States
- Died: July 8, 2001 (aged 85) Orange, California, United States
- Genres: Western swing
- Occupations: Musician, songwriter, bandleader
- Instrument: Electric guitar
- Years active: 1940s-1950s
- Formerly of: The Porky Freeman Trio

Quilla Hugh "Porky" Freeman (June 29, 1916 in Vera Cruz, Missouri, United States – July 8, 2001) was an American Western swing performer, bandleader, and songwriter. He was also an electric guitar pioneer and inventor.

In the 1940s he led the Californian based band, the 'Porky Freeman Trio'. One of his early hits, "Porky's Boogie Woogie on Strings", began rock and roll's evolution out of Western swing. As a session musician he backed many of the popular musicians of the time.

His early experimentation with the electric guitar led to several patents for the instrument. One of the patents, 'Single Pickup Frequency Control For String Instrument', led to legal wrangling with Fender.

== Discography ==
Year	Part #	Titles	Notes
Morris Lee Records
1944	115/116	Red Murrell & The Rhythm Boys: What The Sergeant Said [W-471] (v: Red Murrell [Porky's rhythm guitarist]) // The Rhythm Boys: Porky's Boogie Woogie On Strings [W-472] (i)	
ARA (American Recording Artists) Records
1945	114	Bob Crosby & His Orchestra: On The Atchison, Topeka & Santa Fe [9757] (v: Peggy Lee) // Porky Freeman Trio: On The Night Train To Memphis [12164] (i)	
1945	118	Rum And Coca-Cola [12165] (v: Ruth Foxe) // Boogie Woogie On Strings [12163] (i)	as 'Porky Freeman Trio'
1946	133	Boogie Woogie Boy [1084] (v: Merle Travis) // Tiger Rag [1083] (i)	as 'Porky Freeman Trio'
1946	4009	Porky's Boogie Woogie [1085] (v: Tommy Sargent) // I Love You Too Much [1082] (v: Al Barker [Porky's bass player])	as 'Porky Freeman Trio'
1946	4012	I Left My Heart In Mississippi [1232] (v: Jesse Ashlock) // That Baby's Changed [1231] (v: Jesse Ashlock)	as 'Porky Freeman Trio'
4 Star Records
1948	1233	Everybody Loves That Boogie [1792] (v: Porky Freeman) // Spanish Bells [1796] (i)	as 'Porky Freeman & His Trio'
1948	1246	That Baby's Changed [1820] (v: Jesse Ashlock) // (The Original) Boogie Woogie On Strings [1822] (i)	as 'Porky Freeman & His Trio'
1949	1287	I Left My Heart In Mississippi [1821] (v: Jesse Ashlock) // Electric Guitar Rag [1795] (i)	as 'Porky Freeman & His Trio'
1949	1315	The New Look [3068] (v: Porky Freeman) // Pecos Polka [3070] (i)	as 'Porky Freeman & His Trio'
1950	1423	I Had A Little Wife [3065] (v: Porky Freeman) // Tiger Rag [1823] (i)	as 'Porky Freeman & His Trio'
1950	1478	Strumming Up A Boogie [3072] (i) // Night Train [1826] (i)	as 'Porky Freeman & His Trio'
1950	1523	Indian Love Call [1799] (i) // Slick Chick Boogie [1797] (i)	as 'Porky Freeman & His Trio'
1951	1569	Electric Guitar Blues [3071] (i) // Pickin' 8 To The Bar [1827] (i)	as 'Porky Freeman & His Trio'
1952	1598	Rollin' South [1827-A] (i) // Chicken Pickin' Boogie [1794] (i)	as 'Porky Freeman & His Trio'

note: [bracketed numbers] = matrix numbers, (v) = vocal, (i) = instrumental track

== Compilations ==
- The Boogie Woogie Boy (Cattle Compact [Germany] CCD-294, 2000)
