= Red Murrell =

American singer-songwriter (1921–2001)

- Born: Joyce Wayne Murrell; June 27, 1921; Willow Springs, Missouri, U.S.
- Died: February 10, 2001 (aged 79)
- Genres: Western swing
- Occupations: Musician, Songwriter, Bandleader, Disc jockey
- Instruments: Vocals, Guitar
- Years active: 1940s-1960s
- Labels: Capitol - Signature

Joyce Wayne "Red" Murrell (June 27, 1921 – February 10, 2001) was a Western swing performer from Missouri. He led one of the more notable Western swing bands in California, Red Murrell and his Ozark Playboys. He was a popular session guitar player for many other artists as well. Early in his career, he played with Billy Hughes's band, The Pals of the Pecos. In 1954 he went to work as a disc jockey for KEEN radio (1370 AM) in San Jose.

== Discography ==
Year	Part #	Titles	Notes
Atlas Records (of Hollywood, CA)
1945	108	Texas Home // Molly Darlin'	as 'Red Murrell with Orchestra'
1945	113	Merle Travis with Orchestra: That's All // Red Murrell with Orchestra: Hide Your Face	as 'Red Murrell with Orchestra'
1945	114	Don't Blame Me // Sioux City Sue	as 'Red Murrell with Orchestra'
1946	120	Sittin' Here Alone Feeling Blue // Little Darlin' (I'm Sick And Tired Of You)	as 'Red Murrell & His Ozark Play Boys'
1946	121	I Learned My Lesson Too Late // Steel Guitar Rag (i)	as 'Red Murrell & His Ozark Play Boys'
1946	125	You Nearly Lose Your Mind // Git Fiddle Boogie (i)	as 'Red Murrell & His Ozark Playboys'
1946	126	Walking The Floor Over You // Broomstick Buckaroo	as 'Red Murrell & His Ozark Playboys'
1946	127	Baby Girl // Covered Wagon Rolled Right Along	as 'Red Murrell & His Ozark Playboys'
1947	136	Don't Blame Me // Sioux City Sue (reissue)	as 'Red Murrell with Orchestra'
Signature Records
1947	1020	If You're The Sweetheart Of Somebody Else (Don't Pal Around With Me) // Wake Up, Babe	as 'Red Murrell & His Ozark Playboys'
1947	1021	(I Know My Baby Loves Me) In Her Own Peculiar Way // Get That Chip Off Your Shoulder	as 'Red Murrell & His Ozark Playboys'
Acme Records
1948	1000	Devil In Disguise // I've Got A New Baby	as 'Red Murrell & His Ozark Playboys'
1948	1001	That Naggin' Wife Of Mine // Count Those Broken Hearts	as 'Red Murrell & His Ozark Playboys'
1948	1002	There'll Be Someone To Take Your Place // You Better Chance Your Tune	as 'Red Murrell & His Ozark Playboys'
1948	1003	Forever Faithful // Hound Dog Blues	as 'Red Murrell & His Ozark Playboys'
Gold Seal Records
1948	010	Devil In Disguise // I've Got A New Baby (reissue)	as 'Red Murrell & His Ozark Mountain Boys'
1948	A230	Naggin' Wife // Count Those Broken Hearts (reissue)	as 'Red Murrell & His Ozark Mountain Boys'
1948	A540	There'll Be Someone To Take Your Place // Better Change Your Tune (reissue)	as 'Red Murrell & His Ozark Mountain Boys'
Capitol Records
1949	40229	Ernest Tubb's Talking Blues // Paper Heart	as 'Red Murrell'
1949	40262	The Letter I Forgot To Mail // Sittin' On Top Of The World	as 'Red Murrell'
Lariat Records
1953	1163	I Want To Be A Cowboy's Sweetheart (v: Patsy Prescott) // Pot Of Gold (v: Patsy Prescott)	as 'Red Murill & His Rangers'
Cavalier Records
1955	850	The Way She Got Away // Nobody But You	as 'Red Murrell'
1955	851	Love's Commandments // Two Evil Eyes	as 'Red Murrell'
1956	860	Good Old Country Moon // It Can Happen To You	as 'Red Murrell'
1956	871	Ernest Tubb's Talking Blues // Two Timin' Heart	as 'Red Murrell with Jimmy Rivers & The Cherokees'

note: (v) = vocal, (i) = instrumental track

== Compilations ==
- Sittin' On Top Of The World (Jasmine JASMCD-3544, 2004)

== Bibliography ==
- Malone, Bill C. Country Music, U.S.A.. University of Texas Press, 2002. ISBN 0-292-75262-8
- Komorowski, Adam. Swinging Hollywood Hillbilly Cowboys (Properbox 85, 2004) booklet.
- La Chapelle, Peter. Proud to Be an Okie: Cultural Politics, Country Music, and Migration to Southern California. University of California Press, 2007. ISBN 0-520-24888-0
