= KVVF =

Spanish-language contemporary hit radio in Santa Clara, California

- Santa Clara, California; United States
- Broadcast area: San Jose - Santa Cruz - San Francisco Bay Area
- Frequency: 105.7 MHz (HD Radio)
- Branding: Latino Mix 105.7 y 100.7

Programming
- Language: Spanish
- Format: Contemporary hit radio

Ownership
- Owner: Uforia Audio Network; (Univision Radio Bay Area, Inc.)
- Sister stations: KVVZ; KSOL; KSQL; KBRG

History
- First air date: September 25, 1964 (as KREP)
- Former call signs: KREP (1964–1972); KARA (1972–2002); KEMR (4/1/2002–4/10/2002); KSOL (2002–2003); KEMR (2003–2004)
- Call sign meaning: "Viva" (old station branding)

Technical information
- Facility ID: 19532
- Class: B
- ERP: 50,000 watts
- HAAT: 152 meters (499 ft)
- Transmitter coordinates: 37°21′32″N 121°45′22″W
- Repeater: 100.7 KVVZ (San Rafael)

Links
- Webcast: Listen live (via iHeartRadio)
- Website: Latino Mix 105.7 y 100.7 Website

KVVF (105.7 FM) is a commercial radio station licensed to Santa Clara, California, and is simulcast on 100.7 KVVZ San Rafael. They are owned by Univision Communications, with studios at 1940 Zanker Road in San Jose. They serve the San Francisco Bay Area with a Spanish CHR format, using the slogan "Reggaeton y más".

KVVF has an effective radiated power (ERP) of 50,000 watts. The transmitter is off California State Route 130 in San Jose, near Mount Hamilton. KVVF broadcasts using HD Radio technology.

== History ==
=== Early years (1964–2002) ===
On September 25, 1964, the station signed on as KREP, owned by Robert E. Podesta and his wife Marcella. In 1972, Bob Kieve and Santa Clara Broadcasters bought KREP for $470,000 and changed the call sign to KARA, with an English-language adult contemporary format.

From 1997 to 2000, KARA was the flagship station for the San Jose Sharks NHL hockey team before KUFX took over in 2000.

=== Regional Mexican (2002–2014) ===
Kieve sold KARA in 2002, to Hispanic Broadcasting of Dallas. It became KEMR with a regional Mexican music format at midnight on April 1 that year.

Between 2003 and June 27, 2005, KVVF was a pop, rock y reggaeton station, Viva 105.7, also owned by Univision.

On October 13, 2011, the station changed its former station branding "La Kalle" to "Latino Mix".

=== Hot 105.7 (2014–2019) ===
On March 14, 2014, KVVF and KVVZ dropped the Latino Mix branding and began stunting with a loop of "Hot in Herre" by Nelly; the event would go viral on social media under the hashtag "#nelly1057", while Nelly himself would make a Twitter post inviting listeners to tune in at 5:00 p.m. on March 17. At that time, KVVZ flipped to rhythmic contemporary as Hot 105.7; the new format would feature a mixture of hip-hop, R&B, and other rhythmic hits, while former KMEL personalities Chuy Gomez (who had been fired from the station the previous year) and DJ Mind Motion would join the station to host afternoons. Program director Makr Arias stated that the Bay Area "had been asking for something new and fresh".

In March 2016, after two years of modest ratings (it barely registered in Nielsen's San Francisco ratings) and difficulty competing with KMEL and KRBQ, KVVF de-emphasized its hip hop and R&B direction and added more rhythmic friendly pop hits. Due to 105.7's strong signal over the South Bay, it also changed focus on the whole Bay Area region to concentrate on mostly San Jose and South Bay listeners as well as listeners in nearby Monterey Bay to the south. Univision has opted to retain its simulcast on KVVZ in the process. In November 2017, they further adjusted their playlist by adding Latin hits and adopting what is essentially a three way hybrid of rhythmic, mainstream and Spanish CHR.

=== Return of "Latino Mix" ===
On August 30, 2019, KVVZ began stunting with a loop of "Reggaeton" by J Balvin and "Volver Volver" by Vicente Fernández; on September 2, 2019, KVVZ relaunched the Latino Mix branding and flipped to Spanish rhythmic.
