= KEST =

Multicultural radio station in San Francisco

Coordinates: 37°42′57.8″N 122°23′41.9″W

- San Francisco, California; United States
- Broadcast area: San Francisco Bay Area
- Frequency: 1450 kHz

Programming
- Language: Multilingual
- Format: Talk radio

Ownership
- Owner: Multicultural Broadcasting; (Multicultural Radio Broadcasting Licensee, LLC)
- Sister stations: KIQI, KSJX

History
- First air date: November 30, 1925
- Former call signs: KGTT (1925-1927); KGGC (1927-1939); KSAN (1939-1964); KSOL (1964-1971)

Technical information
- Licensing authority: FCC
- Facility ID: 17410
- Class: C
- Power: 1,000 watts (day); 960 watts (night)

Links
- Public license information: Public file; LMS
- Webcast: Listen live
- Website: kestradio.com

KEST (1450 AM) is a brokered-time radio station licensed to San Francisco, California, United States. Owned by Multicultural Broadcasting, most of the station's programming is in Asian languages, including Mandarin and Cantonese. It also airs some South Asian, Greek, and German programs as well as New Age shows in English. KEST's transmitter is co-sited with KSFB (1260 AM) near the Bayshore Freeway (U.S. Route 101) in San Francisco.

KEST, then called KSOL, was one of the first full-time "rhythm and blues" radio stations in the U.S. That station employed disc jockey Sylvester Stewart, later known as Sly Stone of Sly and the Family Stone recording fame.

== History ==
=== KGTT, KGGC and KSAN ===
The station first signed on with the call sign KGTT on November 30, 1925. A few years later, it switched its call letters to KGGC, which stood for the Golden Gate Broadcasting Company. It was among the first stations on the air in San Francisco. In the 1930s, it was powered at only 100 watts and had to share time with other stations on its frequency of 1420 kilocycles. It was bought in 1939 by Sherwood Patterson, who changed the call letters to KSAN.

After the 1941 enactment of the North American Regional Broadcasting Agreement (NARBA), where many stations switched their dial positions, KSAN moved the dial to 1450 kHz. New studios were constructed in the Merchandise Mart near Market Street, and a 250-watt transmitter was installed in a tower on top of the building.

=== R&B and Soul ===
In 1958, KSAN switched to a full-time rhythm and blues music format, targeting black listeners in the Bay Area, the first station on the local dial to broadcast R&B around the clock. KSAN's transmitter was on top of the Merchandise Mart building on Market Street, where the studios were located. Until the 1950s, San Francisco radio stations devoted little time to "ethnic" programming, except for KSAN and KWBR, which also broadcast programs intended for the Chinese, Italian, Portuguese, German, and Japanese communities.

On July 3, 1964, KSAN was sold to John F. (Les) Malloy and Delmor A. (Del) Courtney, two well-known San Francisco radio and television personalities. Malloy was a local radio star for many years and hosted a popular TV talk show on KGO-TV in the 1950s, while Courtney found fame as a bandleader and personality on KSFO. With Malloy as president and general manager, KSAN became KSOL under new ownership, hoping to better emphasize its "Soul Radio" format until September 1970. KSOL helped launch the career of popular 1960s and 1970s musician Sly Stone, who was one of the station's DJs

=== KEST ===
With urban contemporary stations on the FM dial by the 1970s, KSAN concentrated on other underserved communities in the Bay Area, including ethnic groups looking for radio programming in their language. The station became KEST. In 1974, KEST changed its format to a mix of old-time radio dramas, comedy recordings known as "Freeway Funnies," and talk shows. The station was known as "KEST Theater Of The Air." In 1977, KEST dropped the old-time radio dramas and talk shows and changed formats to religious programming but surprisingly kept the "Freeway Funnies" until 1980.

In the early 1990s, KEST adopted a multilingual ethnic format and became part of Douglas Broadcasting.

=== Translator station ===
In 2019, KEST was granted an FM translator allocation of 104.9 MHz. The coverage of this low-power outlet was expected to be limited to Southeast San Francisco and the city of South San Francisco. 104.9 is also used by classical music station KXSC in Sunnyvale, California, serving the San Jose metropolitan area. KXSC is a full-time simulcast of San Francisco classical station KDFC on 90.3 MHz.

When it went on the air, the KEST translator began interfering with KXSC's signal in some San Jose and San Francisco communities. In reaction, KDFC began an on-air appeal to listeners looking for interference complaints from the new transmitter. Eventually, KEST took its translator station off the air.
