= Billy Hughes (musician) =

- Born: Everette Ishmael Hughes; September 14, 1908; Sallisaw, Oklahoma, U.S.
- Died: May 6, 1995 (aged 86) Horatio, Arkansas, U.S.
- Genres: Western swing
- Occupations: Musician, Songwriter, Bandleader
- Instruments: Vocals, Fiddle, Guitar
- Years active: 1940s-1950s
- Formerly of: The Pals of the Pecos Billy Hughes and His Buccaroos

Everette Ishmael "Billy" Hughes (September 14, 1908 – May 6, 1995) was a Western Swing musician and songwriter. Born in Sallisaw, Oklahoma, he left for California during the Okie exodus of the 1930s. Billy Hughes and His Buccaroos performed during the 1940s and early 1950s. He also owned an independent recording company, Fargo Records. As a writer he is best known for "Tennessee Saturday Night" which was recorded by Red Foley and became a No. 1 hit in 1949. He died in Horatio, Arkansas.

== Discography ==
(Partial discography)

Session	Title	Recording
2283	"My Adobe Hacienda"	King 609
2285	"Writing On The Wall"	King 609
(1947)	"Cocaine Blues"	King 636
	"Take Your Hands Off It (Birthday Cake)"	
(Dec. 1959)	"Waitin' For Saturday Night"	Big D 45-BD-112
(Dec. 1959)	"Tonight"	Big D 45-BD-112

== Compositions ==
(partial list of songs written by Hughes)

Title	Year	Collaborator
"Atomic Sermon"	1953	
"Beside The Alamo"	1953	
"Brimstone Beauty"	1951	
"Cheerful Mary In The Rain"	1992	
"City Song"	1992	
"Cocaine Blues"	1947	credited to Arnall
"Cowboy Saturday Night"	1983	Don Albright
"Darker Days"	1992	
"Dear Judge"	1952	
"For A Little While"	1983	Milam Albright
"I Loved You Once But I Can't Trust You Now"	1940s	Johnny Tyler
"I'll Kiss The Stamp On Your Letter"	1953	
"I'm Not Looking For An Angel"	1953	
"I'm Telling You"	1940s	Texas Jim Lewis
"If I Ever Stop Hurtin'"		
"In the Shadows of My Heart"	1940s	
"Java Junction"	1951	Jess Willard
"Just Pack Up And Go"		
"Lonely Side Of Town"	1981	
"Mama, Who Was That Man?"		
"No Need To Knock On My Door"	1940s	
"Other Doors"	1983	Don Albright
"She's An Okie"		
"Somebody Better Than Me"		
"Take Your Hands Off It (Birthday Cake)"	1940s	
"Tennessee Saturday Night"	c. 1947	
"This Troubled Mind O' Mine"		
"Tonight"	c. 1959	
"Waitin' For Saturday Night"	c. 1959	

== Bibliography ==
- Komorowski, Adam. Swinging Hollywood Hillbilly Cowboys (Properbox 85, 2004) booklet.
