= Chris Douridas =

American DJ and soundtrack producer

Chris Douridas (born September 20, 1962) is an American popular DJ and musical tastemaker at Santa Monica, California's radio station KCRW, where he hosts a two-hour program showcasing progressive new music. He is also a filmmaker, actor, television presenter, and a three-time Grammy-nominated producer of soundtracks and music videos.

== Biography ==
=== KERA ===
Douridas attended North Texas State University (now the University of North Texas) on a theater scholarship where he became involved in campus radio station KNTU-FM. While there, he hosted a freeform morning radio show called The Morning Exchange, mixing blues, bluegrass, reggae, Motown, classical, jazz, and progressive pop. While still in college, Douridas was hired by Dallas, Texas, public radio station KERA, beginning as a weekend classical music host and later promoted as host of the stations All Night Jazz program. In 1987, the station transformed into an all eclectic format, with Douridas hosting the innovative evening show, 90.1 at Night. While there, he created a series called Sound Sessions, live radio sessions featuring Dallas area bands. This show gave a platform, recording resources, and eventually compilation CD exposure to bands such as the Dixie Chicks. At the time the only other broadcasts that featured local bands were on KDGE.

=== KCRW ===
In the 1990s, Chris Douridas became known as the host of KCRW's daily three-hour new music program, Morning Becomes Eclectic, bringing a personal character to the show. He was also the station's music director at the time. When he went independent of KCRW in 1998, he maintained a link to the station by presenting a two-hour program called "Ground Zero", which was renamed "New Ground" after the 9/11 attacks. Later, the show was extended to three hours.

Perhaps Douridas' greatest contribution to the station was his hiring of most of the on air staff including Liza Richardson (a former colleague at Dallas' KERA), Jason Bentley (formerly of KXLU, and former music director/host of "Morning Becomes Eclectic"), Garth Trinidad, Anne Litt (current music director), Gary Calamar, Kevin Ponthier (a former colleague at his college station, KNTU), and Tricia Halloran. Halloran recently left the station and is a Hum in Santa Monica, CA staff music supervisor.

=== Eclectic24 ===
On Labor Day, September 7, 2009, KCRW launched Eclectic24, an online 24-hour music channel. Created and curated by Douridas, who has programmed the channel since its inception, the concept features a continuous original mix of its unique eclectic programming, including many exclusive live tracks captured from on-air performances first broadcast on its flagship daily music program Morning Becomes Eclectic and other programs.

On the occasion of the 2016 Coachella Valley Music and Arts Festival, the channel staged an All-Coachella programming event on April 14–17, 21-24. The concept was further explored on Tuesday, May 24, 2016 in celebration of the 75th birthday of Bob Dylan. A Day of Dylan featured original Dylan masters, covers of and by Dylan, songs about Dylan, and interview clips.

=== Soundtrack work ===
Douridas has carved an extensive career in film music supervision producing the soundtracks of such films as American Beauty, Shrek 2, As Good as It Gets and the Austin Powers trilogy. His work on 1999's American Beauty and 2004's Shrek 2 brought him Grammy nominations.

=== DreamWorks ===
In the late 1990s, Douridas was an A&R executive for DreamWorks Records, the label started by David Geffen, Mo Ostin and Lenny Waronker. While there, he brought in the bands the Eels and Propellerheads, and produced the Grammy nominated soundtracks for American Beauty and Shrek 2.

=== Independent A&R ===
In November 2006, Douridas came across an import release from an artist named Oren Lavie. After a long distance correspondence, the two decided to partner on releasing his album The Opposite Side of the Sea in the US. In May 2008, "Her Morning Elegance", the album's first single, was unveiled in a commercial for Chevy Malibu, and, again in January 2009, in a celebrated stop motion music video that was subsequently nominated for Grammy Award for Best Music Video and viewed over 30mm times. Lavie also contributed an original song for the 2008 Andrew Adamson film, The Chronicles of Narnia: Prince Caspian, which Douridas was consulting on.

In 2015, Douridas embarked on a joint publishing venture with Mothership Publishing, the publishing arm of Anti-Epitaph Records, headed by publishing icon Lionel Conway and Brett Gurewitz. The first signing under this new partnership is with Canadian troubadour Andy Shauf.

=== School Night ===
While attending a wrap party for his latest film project at a venue called Bardot, upstairs from the Avalon Hollywood on Vine Street, Douridas was invited to come back to DJ and curate an evening at the venue. A few months later, on April 12, 2010, he hosted the first in a weekly series described as a 'new Monday night Hollywood party'. The inaugural evening featured live performances from Dawes, The Like and a DJ set from fellow KCRW host Anne Litt. Week two featured the debuts of new projects from Chrissie Hynde and Brett Dennen. In its first year, the series was named "America's Best Party" by Paper Magazine. Since then, School Night, named for the excuse colleagues gave for not being able to attend the late night weeknight event, has become a launch pad for new artist projects. The night is produced in collaboration with LA promoter Matt Goldman. To date, the series has featured the US debuts of London Grammar, Michael Kiwanuka, Chet Faker, Liam Bailey, and Katy B, among others, and the LA debuts of Years and Years, James Bay (singer), The Naked and Famous, Two Door Cinema Club, Wolf Alice, Alt-J, Twin Shadow, Frances (musician), Maximum Balloon, Tom Odell, Villagers, and MNDR. Additionally, the night often hosts surprise appearances from iconic artists as well, with past appearances by Moby, Ben Folds, Chrissie Hynde, Miguel (singer), Florence and the Machine, Daniel Lanois, Brett Dennen, Vanessa Carlton with Stevie Nicks, Lucinda Williams, Rickie Lee Jones, Neil Finn, Matisyahu and Kimbra.

A monthly event dubbed School Night NYC was launched at The Bowery Hotel in 2010. In July 2013, Douridas announced a weekly series would start September 8, 2013 at Brooklyn Bowl, in Brooklyn, New York. The New York event moved to Baby's All Right in Brooklyn in June 2016.

In 2020, in response to the COVID-19 pandemic, School Night temporarily rebranded into a virtual concert series under the name Home School.

=== Actor ===
Douridas began his career as an actor in Texas. While in high school, he was a national champion at the 1980 National Forensics Competition. At North Texas State University, he was a theater major and scholarship recipient. In the late 1980s, Douridas appeared on stage at the Dallas Theater Center, Stage #1, and Dallas Repertory Theater. Film acting credits include the 1984 television movie The Jesse Owens Story, which was Douridas' first film role, a 1986 episode of Dalton's Code of Vengeance, The Texas Chainsaw Massacre 2, Waterworld, and Wim Wenders' 1997 film The End of Violence. Television roles include appearances on Party of Five and Ellen.

=== Television work ===
Douridas hosted the inaugural season of Sessions at West 54th, a live interview and performance series on PBS. The first season featured sessions with Beck, Fiona Apple, Philip Glass, Ani DiFranco, Yo Yo Ma, Sinéad O'Connor, Patti Smith, Sonic Youth, and David Byrne, among others. Douridas brought in renowned documentarian D.A. Pennebaker to shoot the accompanying interview segments for each of the first season's performances.

=== Online: AOL and iTunes ===
Douridas was Vice President of Music for America Online, overseeing the popular Radio@AOL service, a network of 125 original online radio stations. This service was created by Spinner.com, a project spearheaded by Josh Felser and Jim Van Huysse. Felser lured Douridas from DreamWorks. While at AOL, Douridas launched the online interview and performance series "Sessions@AOL", which he hosted and produced.

Following his work with AOL, Douridas was hired by Apple's Steve Jobs to be a creative consultant for the launch of the iTunes music store, creating and producing the iTunes Originals series and iTunes Essentials, a popular lifestyle playlist series.

=== Personal life ===
Douridas was born in Columbus, Ohio.

In January 2006, Douridas and a friend were arrested at the Circle Bar in Santa Monica after a witness accused them of trying to drug and kidnap a female patron, who was underage and at the bar using her cousin's identification. The girl was taken to a local hospital and later released. The Los Angeles County District Attorney awaited toxicology results before deciding whether to file charges. No charges were ever filed following the toxicology results and an investigation.

In an article in the Los Angeles Times, Douridas's ex-wife Mieke Kramer said Douridas was having a drink at the bar when he noticed a girl whom he had met that evening was becoming ill. Seeing no one else moving to assist her, Douridas took it upon himself to help her outside to get fresh air, she said. She described him as "the kind of person who pulls over when he sees someone's car is broken down. This is a case of good intentions misinterpreted and an example of why people don't help each other anymore."

Douridas maintained his innocence throughout the proceedings, as did his longtime workplace, KCRW, who "could have easily distanced itself from Douridas by placing him on administrative leave... stood staunchly behind Douridas from the moment of his arrest." Douridas was released on $1 million bail. After a five-month investigation, no charges related to the woman were ever filed.

On April 30, 2006, Douridas' only daughter died in a drowning accident while having a seizure while bathing in the bathtub at her family's home in South Pasadena. She was 14 years old.

In January 2025, Douridas was reported to have lost his home in the Palisades Fire.

== Select filmography ==
=== Film music credits ===
- Flaked, Netflix, (2016–present).
- Captain Fantastic, Bleecker Street Media, (2016).
- The Sea of Trees, Bloom, (2015).
- Ride, Sandbar Pictures, (2014).
- Mr. Peabody and Sherman, DreamWorks, (2014).
- House of Lies, Showtime Television, (2011–2016).
- In a World..., Roadside Attractions, (2013).
- What Maisie Knew, Millennium Entertainment, (2013).
- The Details, Weinstein Company, (2011).
- Megamind, DreamWorks, (2010).
- Shrek Forever After, DreamWorks, (2010).
- Legion, Sony Pictures, (2010).
- The Education of Charlie Banks, Strongheart Pictures, (2009).
- Monsters vs. Aliens, DreamWorks, (2009).
- The Chronicles of Narnia: Prince Caspian, Disney, (2008).
- The Women, New Line, (2008).
- American Teen, A&E IndieFilms, (2008).
- Bobby, The Weinstein Company, (2007) (With Joel Sill).
- Over the Hedge, DreamWorks, (2006).
- Rumor Has It…, Warner Bros., (2005).
- Madagascar, DreamWorks, (2005).
- The Chumscrubber, El Camino, (2005).
- Shrek 2, DreamWorks, (2004). Grammy Award for Best Compilation Soundtrack Album for a Motion Picture, Television or Other Visual Media - nominee
- The Girl Next Door, Regency, (2004).
- Under the Tuscan Sun, Touchstone, (2003).
- Down With Love, 20th Century Fox, (2003) (with Laura Wasserman Ziffren).
- The Count of Monte Cristo, Spyglass, (2002).
- One Hour Photo, Fox Searchlight, (2002).
- American Beauty, DreamWorks, (1999). Grammy Award for Best Compilation Soundtrack Album for a Motion Picture, Television or Other Visual Media - nominee
- Austin Powers: The Spy Who Shagged Me, New Line, (1999).
- As Good as It Gets, TriStar, (1997).
- One Eight Seven, Warner Bros., (1997).
- Austin Powers: International Man of Mystery, New Line, (1997).
- Grosse Pointe Blank, Hollywood, (1997).
- Grace of My Heart, Universal, (1996).
- Heat, Warner Bros, (1995).
- Waterworld, Universal, (1995).
- Northern Exposure, Universal, (1994).
