= KUSF =

KUSF may refer to:

- KDXA, a radio station (91.3 FM) licensed to serve Glendale, Oregon, United States, which used the KUSF call sign from 2012 to 2021
- KUSF (University of San Francisco), the student-run internet radio station at the University of San Francisco, which broadcast on 90.3 FM until 2011
- KOSC, a radio station (90.3 FM) licensed to serve San Francisco, California, United States, which held the call sign KUSF until 2012
