= KFAC =

KFAC may refer to:

- KFAC-LP, a low-power radio station (105.5 FM) licensed to serve Twisp, Washington, United States
- KWKW, a radio station (1330 AM) licensed to Los Angeles, California, which identified as KFAC from 1931 to 1989
- KRRL, a radio station (92.3 FM) licensed to Los Angeles, California, which identified as KFAC-FM from 1949 to 1989
- KDRW, a radio station (88.7 FM) licensed to Santa Barbara, California, which identified as KFAC from 1991 to 2004
- KRTN-LD, a television station (channel 18, virtual 39) licensed to serve Albuquerque, New Mexico, which identified as KFAC-LP from 2007 to 2009
- Kentucky Folk Art Center, located in Morehead, Kentucky
- Kayak for a Cause, a charity event founded by Miles Spencer and Scott Carlin that crosses Long Island Sound
