= Ruth Seymour =

American broadcasting executive (1935–2023)

- Seymour in her early days at KCRW
- Born: Ruth Epstein; February 17, 1935; New York City, U.S.
- Died: December 22, 2023 (aged 88); Santa Monica, California, U.S.
- Other name: Ruth Hirschman
- Education: City College of New York
- Occupation: Radio executive
- Spouse: Jack Hirschman (m. 1954; div. 1973)
- Children: 2

Ruth Seymour (née Epstein; February 17, 1935 – December 22, 2023) was an American broadcasting executive known for her innovative work with public radio. She has been described as a pioneer in public radio and "a commanding presence in the public radio arena".

== Early years ==
Ruth Epstein was born at Sydenham Hospital in Harlem, New York City. A secular Jew, she grew up across the street from the Bronx Zoo, along with her younger sister. Her parents were both Polish Jewish immigrants; her mother was a garment worker, while her father worked as a furrier. The couple had met while attending The New School for Social Research in New York City.

Epstein's parents were involved in Yiddish-speaking society, and were active in the Workmen's Circle. They sent Epstein to Sholem Aleichem Folk School to learn Yiddish literature and language as a supplement to her public schooling. During her years at City College of New York she studied Yiddish and Hebrew with Jewish linguist Max Weinreich.

== Career ==
Seymour's first venture into radio came at KPFK in Los Angeles from 1961 to 1964. She had moved to the city with her husband in 1961. As that station's drama and literary critic, she produced award-winning series. From 1971 to 1976, she worked as program director there, and she did freelance work for the Pacifica Foundation while traveling in Europe. She was fired in 1976, after the FBI raided the station in search of a tape KPFK had aired from Patty Hearst and the Symbionese Liberation Army, which the station manager refused to turn over. Seymour broadcast the raid live, as it occurred.

Seymour joined the staff of KCRW at Santa Monica College in 1977 as a consultant and was named manager a few months later, in 1978. She retired from there in February 2010 after having helped the station "transcend its basement location to shape the culture in Los Angeles". During her tenure, the station grew from being based in a playground at a middle school and having an old transmitter to covering much of southern California with its broadcasts. It also developed streaming services and podcasts.

In 1979, two factors combined to enhance Seymour's efforts toward advancing KCRW's status. Soon after the station began using a new transmitter, National Public Radio launched Morning Edition. While the area's then-most-significant public radio station ran the two-hour program before 6 a.m., Seymour decided to run it three times each morning from 3 a.m. to 9 a.m. on KCRW. "That way nobody was going to have [the programs] when I didn't have them," she said.

Seymour also brought other programs to KCRW, such as Le Show (hosted by Harry Shearer), Left, Right & Center, Morning Becomes Eclectic, The Politics of Culture, To the Point, and Which Way L.A.? (hosted by Warren Olney). In 1996, KCRW became the first station other than Chicago's WBEZ to air This American Life, and she pushed host Ira Glass to rename the show from its original name, Your Radio Playhouse. She also supported programs that brought literature to the radio, including airing radio dramas adaptations of Babbitt and Ulysses. She also created two popular volumes of the audio collection Jewish Short Stories from Eastern Europe and Beyond, in which well-known actors read works by Jewish authors.

Seymour spearheaded fundraising efforts not only for KCRW, including a $1 million pledge drive in 1995, but also for the network program Weekend All Things Considered in 1985 and for NPR in 1991. She also was active in the effort to simplify podcasting of radio stations' programs. Without blanket licensing agreements, such as those that apply to over-the-air broadcasts and streaming of programs, a separate contract with each record label used in the podcast was required.

In 2008, Seymour successfully lobbied for a municipal bond issue that would allow KCRW to build its own building.

== Hanukkah broadcast ==
In 1979, Seymour launched a program on KCRW that became a tradition, going strong a quarter-century later. Noting the lack of radio programming related to Hanukkah, she created and hosted Philosophers, Fiddlers and Fools, a program that included recordings of Yiddish folk music and songs from Yiddish music halls, a short story by a Yiddish author, and a memorial to the Holocaust. Initially surprised and disappointed because only two people called the station during the broadcast, Seymour thought that it was a failure—until it ended. Then calls kept the staff and their telephones busy for three hours. Thereafter, the show was broadcast annually, with Seymour hosting until 2007.

== Personal life and death ==
Seymour married the poet Jack Hirschman in 1954, after meeting him at the City College of New York, and divorced him in 1973. They had two children. The family traveled often, due to Hirschman's job as a professor at Dartmouth and UCLA. Her son, David, died of lymphoma in 1982, at age 25. Her daughter Celia Hirschman is a music business consultant and is the host of the "On the Beat" program on KCRW.

In 1993, she changed her surname to Seymour to honor her paternal grandfather, who had been a rabbi.

Seymour died at home in Santa Monica, California, on December 22, 2023, at age 88.

== Recognition ==
In 1997, she received Amnesty International's Media Spotlight Award.

In 1999, the Workmen's Circle gave Seymour its Yiddishkayt Award for her "service to Yiddish language and culture."
