= Svejda =

Svejda or Švejda, female Švejdová is a Czech surname. Notable people with the surname include:

- Felicitas Svejda (1920–2016), Austrian-Canadian scientist
- Jim Svejda (born 1947), American music commentator and critic
- Viktorie Švejdová (born 2002), Czech ice hockey player
