= KXSC =

KXSC may refer to:

- KXSC (FM), a radio station (104.9 FM) licensed to serve Sunnyvale, California, United States
- KXSC (AM), a radio station (1560 AM) at the University of Southern California
