= Dale Starkey =

Dale Starkey (June 6, 1924 – January 31, 2010) is an American musician, artist and writer. He spent 65 years in radio and television as host of 365 television shows and thousands of radio programs.

== Biography ==
Dale Starkey was born in 1924 in Pryor, Oklahoma, to Flossie Jones and Garland Starkey. He started his radio career at age 6 as a singer on radio station [WHB]'s program "Kansas City Kiddies Review".

Serving in the U.S. Naval Amphibious forces during World War II, he participated in the Invasion of Omaha Beach, Normandy, France, on his 20th birthday. He was subsequently involved in a bombing during the invasion of Okinawa by a Suicide plane.

On discharge from the service in 1945, he went to work as one of the original voices of classical music station KDFC in San Francisco, California. He then worked at CBS in Hollywood as singer, writer, actor and announcer, retiring in 1982 from San Francisco station KABL.

Starkey continues to do commercial announcing and writes fiction and screenplays at his home in Carmel, California.
