= Classical California =

Classical music public radio network in the US

- Industry: Radio
- Headquarters: U.S.
- Area served: California
- Website: classicalcalifornia.org

Classical California is a public radio network providing classical music programming across the U.S. state of California, owned by the University of Southern California. It was launched in 2023 through the integration of the classical music radio services associated with KUSC in Southern California and KDFC in Northern California, with unified programming debuting in 2025. Its network of transmitters stretches from Palm Springs to the Ukiah area. Programming originates from studios in Los Angeles and San Francisco.

== History ==
Classical California was formed from the integration of what had previously been separate classical music radio stations. The University of Southern California (USC) founded KUSC in Los Angeles, which began broadcasting on October 24, 1946, and which by 2008 had one of the largest audiences of any non-commercial classical music station in the U.S. Two years later, KDFC (102.1 FM) began broadcasting from San Francisco on September 1, 1948. For much of the 1990s and 2000s, KDFC was the most-listened-to music station in San Francisco. KDFC, which had been a commercial station, moved to 90.3 MHz and came under USC control in 2011 when its previous owner, Entercom, moved it off the commercial band and onto the frequencies of the former KUSF of the University of San Francisco and KNDL, a Christian music station that became KOSC.

The reach of KUSC and KDFC was steadily expanded by the acquisition of other radio stations. KUSC came to the Conejo Valley in 1982 when the university bought KCPB (now KDSC) in Thousand Oaks. In 1989, KUSC programming began being broadcast on KPSC in Palm Springs and the Coachella Valley. In 2009, KUSC added coverage of San Luis Obispo and the Central Coast by acquiring KESC, licensed to Morro Bay. USC acquired the former KCNL in the San Jose area in 2012 and added it to the KDFC network as KXSC in 2012; USC acquired signals in Monterey and Big Sur in 2016, with the latter never returning to air and being closed in 2017 due to prolonged technical issues. In 2024, the university traded its translator station in Los Gatos for a construction permit for a station in Livermore.

=== Integration ===
In 2022, USC introduced the common brand Classical California for KDFC and KUSC. By that time, the stations shared night and overnight programming and simulcast from noon to 3 p.m. daily. The new brand came alongside increased streaming and event programming. In February 2025, USC announced that it would integrate the stations into one program service with programming originating from the Los Angeles and San Francisco studios, in order to reduce duplicated efforts. On-air lineups were combined in October 2025, and the integration was completed in February 2026.

== Programming ==
Classical California broadcasts a full-time classical music format, including orchestral, chamber, opera, and choral repertoire, along with hosted presentations and cultural features. Recorded live performances from Southern California and Northern California venues air on Saturday and Sunday nights. Programs originate from the Los Angeles and San Francisco studios.

=== Notable presenters ===
- Lara Downes

== Organization and funding ==
Classical California operates as a nonprofit public media service supported primarily by listener contributions, philanthropic grants, and corporate underwriting. In 2024, KDFC and KUSC (which each reported separate financial returns) had combined revenue of $17.7 million and expenses of $16.8 million and received $1 million in since-cut government funds from the Corporation for Public Broadcasting.

== Coverage ==
Classical California transmitters
Call sign	Frequency	City of license	Facility ID	ERP (W)	HAAT	Class	Transmitter coordinates	Founded
KUSC	91.5 FM	Los Angeles	69318	39,000	891 m (2,923 ft)	B	34°12′45.5″N 118°3′45.7″W	October 24, 1946
KESC	99.7 FM	Morro Bay	58653	285	454 m (1,490 ft)	A	35°21′39.9″N 120°39′24.6″W	June 1, 1991
KPSC	88.5 FM	Palm Springs	69394	1,600	180 m (591 ft)	A	33°51′56.1″N 116°26′7″W	January 1979
KDB	93.7 FM	Santa Barbara	51169	12,500	390 m (1,280 ft)	B	34°27′57.9″N 119°40′40.4″W	October 1960
KDSC	91.1 FM	Thousand Oaks	69116	4,800	265 m (869 ft)	B	34°24′47″N 119°11′10″W	December 4, 1979
KDFC	90.3 FM	San Francisco	69143	1,000	301 m (988 ft)	B1	37°51′3.7″N 122°29′53.9″W	April 1964 (Note: This is the sign-on date for the 90.3 facility, not for KDFC at 102.1.)
KDFL	89.9 FM	Livermore	766057	50	112 m (367 ft)	A	37°35′41.6″N 121°39′46.7″W	2025
KOSC	89.9 FM	Angwin	27946	800	933 m (3,061 ft)	A	38°40′09″N 122°37′53″W	May 1961
KDFG	103.9 FM	Seaside	15936	1,500	199 m (653 ft)	A	36°35′09″N 121°55′23″W	October 1995
KXSC	104.9 FM	Sunnyvale	54478	6,000	−47 m (−154 ft)	A	37°19′22″N 121°45′19″W	March 1961
K223AJ	92.5 FM	Lakeport	27945	10	561 m (1,841 ft)	D	39°07′49″N 123°04′35″W	—

- Classical California transmitters
- Full-power stations Low-power translators
