= KNDL =

KNDL may refer to:

- KNDL (FM), a radio station (100.7 FM) licensed to serve Berthold, North Dakota, United States
- KOSC, a radio station (89.9 FM) licensed to serve Angwin, California, United States, which held the call sign KNDL from 1998 to 2011
- KNDL Abbreviation of Kirby: Nightmare in Dream Land, a remake of Kirby's Adventure
