= KUSC =

- Los Angeles, California; United States
- Broadcast area: Southern California
- Frequency: 91.5 MHz (HD Radio)

Programming
- Format: Classical music
- Network: Classical California

Ownership
- Owner: University of Southern California

History
- First air date: October 24, 1946
- Call sign meaning: University of Southern California

Technical information
- Licensing authority: FCC
- Facility ID: 69318
- Class: B
- ERP: 39,000 watts (directional)
- HAAT: 891 meters (2,923 ft)
- Transmitter coordinates: 34°12′48″N 118°03′41″W
- Repeater: See § Transmitter network

Links
- Public license information: Public file; LMS
- Webcast: Listen live
- Website: classicalcalifornia.org

KUSC (91.5 FM) is a non-commercial radio station in Los Angeles, California, United States, broadcasting a classical music format. It is owned by the University of Southern California (USC) and is part of its Classical California network. In Los Angeles, Classical California maintains studios in the USC Tower downtown and broadcasts from a transmitter on Mount Harvard, near Mount Wilson.

KUSC began broadcasting on October 24, 1946, and was the first radio station in the U.S. owned by a privately endowed university. It continued as a primarily student-run and educationally oriented station until April 1973, when it converted to a full-time classical music format. Under general manager Wallace Smith, who ran KUSC from 1973 to 1987 and 1988 to 1996, KUSC became one of the preeminent and most-listened-to public radio stations in the United States. It was one of the founding members of American Public Radio, one of the first major-market public radio stations to disaffiliate from NPR, and in the 1990s it was the producer of the business news program Marketplace. It bought or built stations serving Thousand Oaks, Santa Barbara, and Palm Springs, repeating KUSC programs. In later years, particularly after the demise of classical music competitor KFAC in 1989, Smith's attempts to make KUSC's classical format less traditional and more accessible to younger and diverse audiences bred discontent from core listeners and ultimately created financial difficulties for the station.

After Smith's departure, KUSC reverted to a more traditional classical sound. From 1999 to 2008, its programming was distributed nationally as the Classical Public Radio Network, an arrangement that limited the amount of local content and references KUSC could include on the air. In 2009, USC bought a radio station serving San Luis Obispo.

USC expanded its classical music services to Northern California in 2011 by acquiring KDFC in San Francisco, which continued to operate separately. Both stations were branded as Classical California in 2022 but continued to maintain separate morning and afternoon programming. They were combined into a single program service in February 2026.

== History ==
=== Early years ===
On March 18, 1944, the University of Southern California (USC) applied to the Federal Communications Commission (FCC) for permission to build a new FM radio station in Los Angeles, to broadcast on 42.9 MHz. The commission approved the application on August 15 and modified it in July 1946 to specify 91.7 MHz instead. On October 24, 1946, KUSC began broadcasting regular programs from 6 to 9 p.m., six days a week. Its antenna was mounted on a 250-foot (76 m) tower on the Hancock Building on the campus. A formal dedication followed on December 5 of the first radio station owned and operated by a privately endowed university. At the start, KUSC was patronized by the George Allan Hancock Foundation and featured student-produced programming.

KUSC was moved to 91.5 MHz in 1947. The station was regularly operating for 4 1/2 hours a day by May 1947 and 7 hours by 1951. The station's "top announcer" in its first year was Stan Chambers, a graduate student who left for a job with TV station KTLA; other notable USC alumni who worked at the station and went on to broadcasting careers included Bill Owen and George Grande.

The university recognizes KUSC's value as a student-run radio training ground, but doesn't seem to realize its value as a powerful station in the largest radio market in the world.

— Jerry Trowbridge, in a 1972 article in the Daily Trojan

In 1970, the station was transferred out of the Department of Telecommunications and into student operation, but its potential was limited by meager budgets compared to other college radio stations and other noncommercial stations in Los Angeles. Though USC had invested in stereo equipment to upgrade older equipment that was no longer of broadcast quality, by the early 1970s, the station was a mostly disorganized string of educational programming, either produced by volunteers or sent in by other agencies. For instance, programs on KUSC's schedule in 1971 ranged from the talk programs Psychology Now, Rapline and Trojan Sports Report to comedy and blocks of middle-of-the-road, classical, progressive, and jazz music. The Corporation for Public Broadcasting (CPB) was offering to connect KUSC for public radio service for free, but KUSC did not have a paid staff—which the corporation required for eligibility. A dispute over transmitter sites with KJLH in Compton led to that station's owner filing a petition to deny renewal of KUSC's broadcast license. It primarily broadcast rock music, which many other stations in the Los Angeles area supplied.

=== Classical: The Wallace Smith era ===
In 1972, Wallace Smith—a recent doctoral graduate of USC—became the station's first full-time general manager. Smith immediately set out to professionalize the station. With funding from the CPB, KUSC joined NPR, and the station was reorganized into USC's School of Performing Arts. On April 2, 1973, the station adopted a new format of classical music. Abram Chasins, the former musical director of New York's WQXR, joined as cultural development director. With the CPB's first ever grant to expand a radio service in a major market, in 1976, the station moved its transmitter to Lookout Mountain and its studio to newer, larger space on campus. With its new facilities, KUSC now had full-market coverage. To match, the paid staff was expanded from 5 employees to 25 and the music library doubled in size. James Brown of the Los Angeles Times noted that the station was mounting a serious challenge to another major fine arts station in Los Angeles, KFAC. Conversely, student involvement dropped off: by 1977, the only area where USC students were involved was graduate journalism students producing newscasts. Within three years of the grant, the station's weekly audience rose from 40,000 listeners to 224,000, a figure that made KUSC the most-listened-to public radio station in the nation. Within a decade, KUSC had, in the words of Mark Schwed of the Los Angeles Herald Examiner, "[grown] ... from a rinky-dink college station to one that now produces programs that are heard throughout the country". One of those programs was a radio drama adaptation of Star Wars. Announced in 1979 as a co-production with the BBC, which pulled out of the project before its 1981 debut, the series was possible because George Lucas—an alumnus of USC—sold the station the rights for a dollar. In 1981, KUSC acquired KCPB, a public radio station in the Conejo Valley that had struggled financially since its 1979 startup, and began simulcasting its programming in that area.

In 1982, KUSC was one of five founding members of American Public Radio, initially intended as a distribution organization for fine arts programming, including KUSC presentations such as Los Angeles Philharmonic concerts. The early 1980s brought financial mismanagement and budget cuts for NPR. Smith, one of NPR's directors, opted to resign from the board, and in 1985, KUSC pulled out of NPR entirely and dropped the last NPR news program it carried, All Things Considered. By this time, KUSC had become one of the most successful radio stations in the city with 38 full-time employees and 25,000 subscribing members.

Smith departed KUSC in 1987 to become the manager of the WNYC stations in New York City. KUSC struggled to find a replacement for Smith, and he struggled with the workplace dynamic at WNYC. He returned a year later to a new title as president of USC Radio, overseeing KUSC and the university's entire radio apparatus. During this time, Smith expressed concern that the existing classical radio format needed to be broadened so as to attract younger listeners who were not as exposed to classical music. The format changes came in September 1989 and brought an afternoon entertainment magazine and lighter classical fare to the station's airwaves, and coincided with the demise of KFAC and KFAC-FM, which were both sold and switched formats. KFAC-FM's new owners, Evergreen Media, donated the station's music library to KUSC along with a $35,000 check, (Note: This did not include KFAC's compact disc collection, which consisted of titles that KUSC already held. Those recordings were instead donated to Stanford University and the Los Angeles Public Library.) and KUSC acquired the broadcast rights to the Philadelphia Orchestra and Texaco Metropolitan Opera. KUSC simulcast KFAC's format switch, including KFAC general manager Jim de Castro ceremoniously "passing a baton" to KUSC general manager Wallace Smith, and a farewell message from outgoing morning host Rich Capparela, whom KUSC rehired. KUSC also obtained rights to the KFAC call sign, which was placed on the former KSCA, KUSC's repeater in Santa Barbara.

From the management on down, the approach is personality-driven, intensely so. By now notorious for their unabashed willingness to stretch the boundaries of the traditional music mix in an effort to grow their audience.

— Greg Hettmansberger, describing KUSC in a 1991 article in LA Weekly

Both changes, in particular the emphasis on lighter programming and features, generated discontent from some listeners. When Jurgen Gothe—host of the Canadian national eclectic classical program DiscDrive, whose producer Tom Deacon was hired by KUSC—did a two-week hosting stint, listeners revolted due to its playing of excerpts instead of entire selections and playing of non-classical music. In one case, afternoon announcer Tom Crann—who arrived at KUSC from Buffalo, New York—resigned after less than a year because of what he called "nasty, thoughtless personal attacks" relating to the more casual format. KUSC moved its main transmitter in 1993 from Lookout Mountain to Mount Harvard near Mount Wilson. The move increased the signal strength and quality after a period of time in which a new station in Tijuana, XHTIM-FM, broadcast on the same frequency and caused interference.

In 1990, KUSC assumed production of Marketplace, a daily business news program that had previously been produced by KLON in Long Beach. KUSC had previously been involved since the program's debut on January 2, 1989, but the university and underwriter General Electric saved the show when it appeared it might not be able to continue. Under USC production, Marketplace expanded distribution to more than 250 public radio stations and won a Alfred I. duPont–Columbia University Award.

Though Smith defended KUSC's broader format as avoiding becoming "a cultural backwater appealing to a declining audience" and appealing to a more diverse market, in September 1996 the station announced it would return to a more traditional format amid a $500,000 financial deficit—attributed in part by USC's decision to charge KUSC rent—and continued dissatisfaction by loyal listeners. An internal audit found that the station had lost a third of its subscribers over three years and was not attracting new listeners with the broader format. The news was followed by the resignations of Smith and his wife, morning drive host Bonnie Grice. After their departures, KUSC relaunched with the new classical-focused format, from which the station deviated only to air Marketplace and The NewsHour with Jim Lehrer. Its finances improved, and thousands of new members made pledges.

=== The Pennell/Barnes era ===
In September 1997, Brenda Pennell (Barnes) of WGUC in Cincinnati was named as the new general manager of KUSC. Unlike Smith, her title did not include USC's non-classical music operations. Over the next several years, the two remaining talk programs on the weeknight schedule were dropped. The NewsHour was discontinued in March 1998, and in 2000 USC sold Marketplace to Minnesota Public Radio, the new operator of KPCC, and dropped the program from its own lineup.

In 1999, KUSC and Colorado Public Radio partnered to form the Classical Public Radio Network (CPRN), a national 24-hour classical music service. Programming from KUSC and Colorado Public Radio's KVOD was featured on the service, which NPR distributed to public radio stations. CPRN was unwound in July 2008, a move that removed a restriction on KUSC's programming. Because KUSC programming was being distributed nationally, on-air references to Los Angeles were deliberately minimized. The move coincided with the end of classical programming on what had been KMZT, and both events propelled KUSC's weekly listenership above KPCC and KCRW.

KUSC moved its studios to the Manulife Building at Fifth and Figueroa streets in downtown Los Angeles in 2001. In 2010, it moved its broadcast studio to the USC Tower.

=== Classical California ===
USC expanded its involvement in classical music radio in 2011 by buying the format and call sign of KDFC, a commercial classical music station in San Francisco. KDFC programming moved to noncommercial signals in San Francisco and Angwin. Barnes departed in 2018 to run Seattle's KING-FM and was replaced as president of USC Radio by Judy McAlpine, a former American Public Media and CBC Radio executive.

In 2022, USC introduced the common brand Classical California for KDFC and KUSC. By that time, the stations shared night and overnight programming and simulcast from noon to 3 p.m. daily, but they continued separate programming at other times. The new brand came alongside increased streaming and event programming. In February 2025, USC announced that it would integrate the stations into one program service with programming originating from the Los Angeles and San Francisco studios, in order to reduce duplicated efforts. On-air lineups were combined in October 2025, and the integration was completed in February 2026.

== Programming ==
KUSC is the origination point for some of Classical California's programming. At the time it merged lineups with KDFC in 2026, KUSC morning host Jennifer Miller Hammel became the weekday morning host across both stations; KUSC's Alan Chapman hosted afternoons; and KUSC's Lara Downes hosted nights. Recorded concerts from venues in Southern California are presented on Saturday evenings.

=== Notable presenters ===
- Jim Svejda – 1979–2022

== Repeaters in Southern California ==
KUSC began expanding throughout Southern California in the 1980s. In 1982, its programming began airing on KCPB in Thousand Oaks. USC built KSCA (88.7 FM) in Santa Barbara, which began broadcasting in January 1985 and changed its call sign to KFAC in 1989. On November 30, 1989, the former KPSH-FM, a shuttered school station in Palm Springs, returned to the air as KPSC. KCPB and KSCA became KDSC and KQSC in 2004. In 2009, USC bought a station in Morro Bay, serving San Luis Obispo, which became KESC.

In February 2014, public radio station KCRW of Santa Monica announced that it would buy Santa Barbara's other classical station, KDB (93.7 FM), from the Santa Barbara Foundation for $1 million. The foundation stipulated that the station remain in the classical music format as a condition of sale. KCRW then agreed to trade KDB to USC in exchange for its previous signal, KQSC (the former KFAC). The swap permitted KCRW to begin broadcasting its programming in the Santa Barbara area in August 2014 on the former KQSC, given the new call sign KDRW; at the same time, KDB joined the KUSC network.

The main KUSC signal has a booster, built in 2007 to improve the signal in Santa Clarita.

Classical California transmitters in Southern California
Call sign	Frequency	City of license	Facility ID	ERP (W)
KUSC (HD)	91.5 FM	Los Angeles	69318	39,000
KESC (HD)	99.7 FM	Morro Bay	58653	285
KPSC (HD)	88.5 FM	Palm Springs	69394	1,600
KDB	93.7 FM	Santa Barbara	51169	12,500
KDSC (HD)	91.1 FM	Thousand Oaks	69116	4,800
