= KESC =

Coordinates: 35.361°N 120.657°W

- Morro Bay, California; United States
- Broadcast area: San Luis Obispo, California
- Frequency: 99.7 MHz (HD Radio)

Programming
- Format: Classical
- Network: Classical California

Ownership
- Owner: University of Southern California
- Sister stations: KUSC

History
- First air date: June 1, 1991
- Former call signs: KWVD (1991); KWWV (1991–1999); KKAL (1999–2004); KXTY (2004–2009)

Technical information
- Licensing authority: FCC
- Facility ID: 58653
- Class: A
- ERP: 285 watts directional
- HAAT: 454 meters (1,490 ft)

Links
- Public license information: Public file; LMS
- Webcast: Listen live
- Website: www.classicalcalifornia.org

KESC (99.7 FM) is a non-commercial radio station licensed to Morro Bay, California, and broadcasting to the San Luis Obispo area. The station is owned by the University of Southern California and is part of its Classical California network.

== History ==
The station first signed on June 1, 1991, as KWWV with a soft adult contemporary format. and broadcast an adult contemporary music format. KWWV was acquired by Salisbury Broadcasting in 1994. and by that year had flipped to hot adult contemporary. KWWV in 1998 switched formats from new age/contemporary to rhythmic contemporary, branding as Kiss.

On September 27, 1999, American General Media (AGM), which managed the station for Salisbury, swapped KWWV's format and call sign with that of KKAL (106.1 FM), a country station. The country format lasted less than a year on the new frequency, as American General flipped the station in August 2000 to a combination of hot talk and sports, anchored by the rights to Cal Poly Mustangs athletics. For 2003, KKAL acquired local play-by-play rights to Los Angeles Dodgers baseball. On June 28, 2004, AGM moved the KKAL call sign to 92.5 MHz, pairing it with a classic country format, and eliminated local news from the offering on the renamed KXTY. The station had dropped sports by this point to feature an all-talk lineup.

Mapleton Communications announced in September 2006 that it was purchasing KXTY and KWWV from Salisbury for $1 million. However, this transaction was not completed. On August 20, 2007, Lazer Communications agreed to assume Mapleton's rights to purchase KXTY; by this point, the sale from Salisbury was valued at $1.2 million. KXTY's talk programming ceased on November 16. On November 19, Lazer changed the format of KXTY to Spanish adult contemporary music.

On February 11, 2009, the University of Southern California (USC) purchased KXTY for $1.2 million, adding the signal to its network of stations relaying KUSC, a non-commercial station in Los Angeles airing classical music. On May 13, 2009, the station began rebroadcasting KUSC's signal with new call letters KESC. USC had previously attempted without success to buy KGDP-FM in the Santa Maria area. The programming of KUSC and KDFC in San Francisco, also owned by USC, were combined as Classical California in 2026.
