= KPSC (FM) =

KUSC classical music public radio station in Palm Springs, California

- Palm Springs, California; United States
- Broadcast area: Coachella Valley
- Frequency: 88.5 MHz (HD Radio)

Programming
- Format: Classical music
- Network: Classical California

Ownership
- Owner: University of Southern California

History
- First air date: January 1979
- Former call signs: KPSH-FM (1979–1987)
- Former frequencies: 88.3 MHz (1979–1981)
- Call sign meaning: "Palm Springs USC"

Technical information
- Licensing authority: FCC
- Facility ID: 69394
- Class: A
- ERP: 1,600 watts
- HAAT: 180 meters (590 ft)
- Transmitter coordinates: 33°51′56″N 116°26′4″W

Links
- Public license information: Public file; LMS
- Webcast: Listen live
- Website: www.classicalcalifornia.org

KPSC (88.5 FM) is a non-commercial radio station licensed to Palm Springs, California, United States. The station is owned by the University of Southern California and is a repeater of Classical California station KUSC, carrying their classical music format.

== History ==
KPSH-FM 88.3 went on the air in January 1979. It was the radio station of Palm Springs High School and initially broadcast with 10 watts, giving it coverage from Windy Point to Cathedral City. The station operated only during the school day; students could not hear the station's output except at lunch and in the auto and wood shop classes. KPSH-FM generally aired a freeform format with an emphasis on rock, which it retained throughout its time as a high school station. The station was approved to relocate to 88.5 MHz in 1981; in 1982, it also was allowed to increase its power to 180 watts—enough to be heard in Desert Hot Springs and Rancho Mirage—and become a full Class A station.

As a vocational tool, however, KPSH was not meeting its objectives; students could not be placed in industry jobs, and as a result, KPSH-FM was shut down by 1986. At that time, the Riverside County School District—which held the license—was approached by officials at the University of Southern California; Palm Springs Unified School District and Riverside County schools officials agreed to turn over the license. USC had been attempting to establish itself in the Palm Springs area since 1980; in 1985, it applied for a noncommercial frequency (91.7 MHz) that it asked to be allotted to nearby Palm Desert. However, interference concerns to an allocation at Indio and the competing application of the Prairie Avenue Gospel Center—which ultimately won the station in 1989 and signed it on as KHCS—held up any award.

USC constructed a new transmitter facility at the KPLM site in Thousand Palms; the owner of KPLM, Arthur Rivkin, allowed the university to share the tower. While the newly renamed KPSC was intended to begin operating as a near-complete repeater of KUSC in the fall of 1988, broadcasts were delayed while the station sought federal grant monies. It was the first public radio service for Palm Springs. Additionally, USC began seeking studio space in Palm Desert; the city's economic development committee supported the move but suggested USC change the call letters to KPDC to reflect Palm Desert, not Palm Springs.

KPSC began broadcasting as a KUSC repeater on November 30, 1989. Coachella Valley listeners to KPSC immediately made themselves known in KUSC's fund drives. Less than two months after KPSC went into service, donations from the Palm Springs area accounted for seven percent of the funds raised in a pledge drive.

KPSC was the first station in the KUSC network to broadcast in HD Radio and one of the first in the United States; HD equipment was installed on August 1, 2003, less than a year after the standard was authorized for use.
