= KUSF (University of San Francisco) =

Radio station at the University of San Francisco

KUSF College Radio
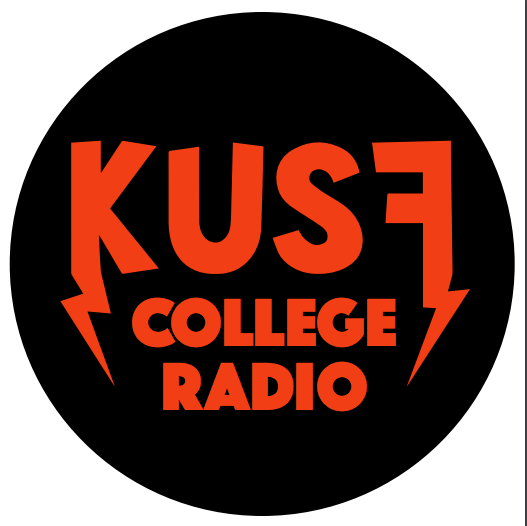
- San Francisco; United States

Programming
- Format: College radio

Ownership
- Owner: University of San Francisco

History
- Founded: 1963
- Last air date: January 2011

Links
- Webcast: Listen Live
- Website: kusf.org

KUSF is an online-only radio station owned by the University of San Francisco and operated by its students. From 1963 until 2011, the station was a non-commercial radio station licensed to San Francisco, California, broadcast at 90.3 FM.

== KUSF history ==
KUSF began in 1963 as a campus-only AM station managed by the Associated Students of the University of San Francisco (ASUSF). In 1973, the University of San Francisco (USF) was offered an FM radio station by a small local Bible college that wished to discontinue its radio operations. USF accepted the offer and on April 25, 1977, KUSF became an FM station broadcasting on the 90.3 frequency. The old AM station later became the student-managed KDNZ.

Originally broadcasting six hours a day, KUSF began broadcasting 24 hours a day in 1981. In its early days KUSF was a conventional college station, broadcasting programs of interest to the university and greater San Francisco community. However, KUSF soon garnered attention by playing new underground music: it was one of the first radio stations to play punk rock. Many now-famous acts also first gained exposure on KUSF, most notably The B-52s and Metallica.

In addition to Metallica, the program Rampage Radio (hosted on Saturday nights on KUSF from midnight to 5AM by Ron Quintana) was responsible for helping launch the careers of heavy metal bands, or giving them their first exposure in San Francisco, such as Iron Maiden, Queensrÿche, Megadeth, Venom, Slayer, Suicidal Tendencies, Anthrax, Overkill, Manowar, Accept, Anvil and Raven, as well as local Bay Area acts Y&T, Metal Church, Exodus, Possessed, Testament, Death Angel, Forbidden, Lȧȧz Rockit, Vio-lence and Heathen.

On January 18, 2011, USF announced plans to sell the 90.3 FM frequency to the Classical Public Radio Network, which is owned by the University of Southern California. In addition, USC announced that it had reached an agreement with Entercom Communications to take over the intellectual property of local classical outlet KDFC (102.1 FM), and moved the station's programming to the 90.3 FM frequency. The KUSF intellectual property remained with USF, which launched an upgraded online-only station.

On February 8, 2011, the San Francisco Board of Supervisors voted 8-3 to oppose the sale.

== Programming ==
The station's musical programming varies from rock to hip-hop to world music. New music programming is broadcast Monday through Friday from midnight to 6 PM. Cultural programming takes over weekdays from 6 PM to midnight, and all day Saturday and Sunday.

== Awards and recognition ==
KUSF was nominated for "College/Non-Commercial Radio Station Of The Year" in the 2008 PLUG Independent Music Awards. In July 2000, KUSF was named one of twenty recommended radio stations in the United States by US Airways' "ATTACHE" magazine. KUSF possesses Gold Records from groups including R.E.M., the Bangles, Red Hot Chili Peppers, Cowboy Junkies, Midnight Oil, the B-52's, and Love and Rockets. KUSF has received numerous for the long-running community service series that is broadcast weekly. A Certificate of Merit was awarded to KUSF by the American Heart Association for outstanding service in stimulating public support in the fight against heart disease. On June 7, 1998, San Francisco Mayor Willie Brown held "Fighting Back Day in San Francisco" in honor of KUSF's community service series for senior and disabled citizens. The mayor also held "KUSF 90.3 FM Stereo Day In San Francisco" on April 25, 1998, KUSF's birthday. KUSF was the recipient of the National Association of College Broadcasters' National College Radio Award for "Best Community Service Programming" in 1993-94. KUSF was named Best Radio Station by SF Weekly in 2001, 2003, 2004, 2006, and 2007.

== Events ==
KUSF sponsors Rock-n-Swap, a large record collectors' fair held five times a year on the USF campus. Rock-n-Swap features music-related items of all kinds, including but not limited to vinyl albums, CDs, DVDs, books, and posters. All proceeds benefit KUSF. KUSF holds numerous concerts in the Bay Area.

== Staff ==
KUSF is currently managed by Miranda Morris. The station staff primarily includes students at the university.
