= KOSC =

KDFC classical music public radio station in Angwin, California

- Angwin, California; United States
- Broadcast area: Santa Rosa, California
- Frequency: 89.9 MHz

Programming
- Language: English
- Format: Classical music
- Network: Classical California
- Affiliations: San Francisco Symphony; San Francisco Opera; Metropolitan Opera

Ownership
- Owner: University of Southern California

History
- First air date: August 7, 1961
- Former call signs: KANG (1961–81); KPRN (1981–83); KCDS (1983–98); KNDL (1998–2011); KDFC (2011–17)
- Former frequencies: 88.1 MHz (1961–68)

Technical information
- Licensing authority: FCC
- Facility ID: 27946
- Class: B
- ERP: 800 watts
- HAAT: 925 meters (3,035 ft)
- Transmitter coordinates: 38°40′9″N 122°37′53″W
- Translator: 92.5 K223AJ (Lakeport)

Links
- Public license information: Public file; LMS
- Webcast: Listen live; Listen live (via TuneIn)
- Website: www.classicalcalifornia.org

KOSC (89.9 FM) is a non-commercial radio station licensed to Angwin, California, United States, and serving the Santa Rosa area. The station broadcasts a classical music format as a full-time simulcast of KDFC in San Francisco. It is owned by the University of Southern California. KDFC is the radio home of the San Francisco Symphony and the San Francisco Opera.

== History ==
KANG went on the air in 1961 at 88.1 MHz, moving to 89.9 MHz in January 1968. The station's call letters later changed to KPRN (1981 to 1983), KCDS (1983 to 1998), and KNDL (1998 to 2011). Throughout most of this time, the frequency and station were owned by the Howell Mountain Broadcasting Company, then a subsidiary of Pacific Union College.

Howell Mountain operated the station as "user supported Christian" with no commercials. The station also broadcast on the Internet. The KNDL call letters represented the station branding as The Candle. This is a reference to themes from the Bible such as "Jesus is the Light of the World", and "We should not hide that light, but should put our light where it is visible to the world."

On January 18, 2011, KNDL ceased operation of its religious format upon the announcement of the purchase of the station by the University of Southern California (USC)'s Classical Public Radio Network. That same day, the group switched KNDL and its translators to a simulcast of KDFC-FM in San Francisco, which moved to the 90.3 MHz signal also acquired by USC. On April 5, 2011, the deal closed, and KNDL officially changed its call sign to KDFC.

On May 1, 2017, the radio station swapped its call sign with 90.3 FM in San Francisco to become KOSC. The San Francisco station became KDFC.

In mid-2025, KOSC expanded its signal to Dublin, Pleasanton, and Livermore.

== Programming ==
KDFC broadcasts classical music 24 hours a day, and morning drive hours also feature short news and traffic updates by Hoyt Smith. Programming features include: the Big One @ 1 at 1 p.m., the Island of Sanity at 5 p.m., and the Classical Giant at 10 at 10pm. The San Francisco Symphony airs Tuesday nights at 8 p.m.

KDFC's self-described approach to the classical format includes special programming and promotions such as the "KDFC World Tour" (the music of a different country, every hour); "History on Shuffle"; (fantasy iPod sets of famous people through history); and the "KDFC Classical Star Search" talent contest.

In addition to FM and Shoutcast MP3 streaming, KDFC was the first radio station in the country to broadcast in digital HD Radio, offering a secondary HD Radio channel, KDFC-2, featuring longer classical pieces and vocal works, without commercials on their former 102.1 FM frequency.

A multiple winner of the award for public service, KDFC is an active partner to arts groups and an active advocate for music education. Proceeds from the station's annual CD sampler, and the annual 'Music Educator of the Year' support and celebrate public school music programs.

== Additional frequencies ==
In addition to KOSC, the programming of KDFC is transmitted by these stations and translators to widen its broadcast area.

- KDFC — 90.3 FM, licensed to San Francisco, California
- KXSC — 104.9 FM, licensed to Sunnyvale, California
- KDFG — 103.9 FM, licensed to Seaside, California
- K212AA — 90.3 FM, licensed to Los Gatos, California
- K223AJ — 92.5 FM, licensed to Lakeport, California
