= KXSC (FM) =

Radio station in Sunnyvale, California

- Sunnyvale, California; United States
- Broadcast area: Santa Clara Valley
- Frequency: 104.9 MHz (HD Radio)

Programming
- Language: English
- Format: Classical music
- Network: Classical California
- Affiliations: San Francisco Symphony; San Francisco Opera; Metropolitan Opera

Ownership
- Owner: University of Southern California

History
- First air date: March 14, 1961
- Former call signs: KHYD (1961–64); KFMR (1964–79); KDOS (1979–83); KBRG (1983–97); KUFX (1997–98); KLDZ (1998–99); KCNL (1999–2005); KMJO (2005); KCNL (2005–12)

Technical information
- Licensing authority: FCC
- Facility ID: 54478
- Class: A
- ERP: 6,000 watts
- HAAT: −47 meters (−154 ft)
- Transmitter coordinates: 37°19′22″N 121°45′19″W

Links
- Public license information: Public file; LMS
- Webcast: Listen live; Listen live (via TuneIn)
- Website: www.classicalcalifornia.org

KXSC (104.9 FM) is a radio station based in Sunnyvale, California, serving the southern San Francisco Bay Area. It is owned by the University of Southern California and airs a classical music format as a full-time simulcast of KDFC in San Francisco. The station broadcasts in HD.

== History ==
KXSC began in 1961 as KHYD, a 3,000–watt station operating from a house on Mowry Avenue in Fremont, California.

The station call letters changed to KFMR in 1964. 18-year-old Bill Stairs was among the alumni of early days of KFMR who went on to a career as a DJ, program director and broadcast consultant in markets from Spokane, Sacramento and San Diego in the west to Boston and Chicago in the east. Another early DJ at KFMR was writer Timothy Perrin, winner of the 2007 Angie Award for best screenplay. Under new ownership in the early 1980s, KFMR changed to a religious format.

In 1983, it became Spanish-language KDOS, as La Chiquitita with its studios in Fremont. By December 1983, the station adopted KBRG call letters from 105.3 (now KITS). In 1986, brothers Danny Villanueva and James Villanueva, owners of Radio América, Inc, Bahia Radio, purchased KBRG. The station became "La Nueva KBRG" from 1986 to 1992. The station continued the Spanish-language music and variety format and aired Oakland Athletics baseball games in Spanish, with Amaury Pi-Gonzalez as announcer. In 1989, EXCL Communications purchased KBRG from Radio América, Inc and flipped to a Spanish AC format known as Super Estrella. The format was rebranded to Radio Romantica in the mid 1990s.

As the Hispanic population grew in the East Bay during the 1990s. EXCL was vying to find a stronger signal other than 104.9 which only covers the South Bay. On December 31, 1997, EXCL reached a deal with American Radio Systems, in a three-station frequency swap, EXCL's Radio Romantica format moved to 100.3 and 104.9 became KUFX.

In August 1998, new owner Jacor changed the format to modern adult contemporary and the call letters to KLDZ. Six months later, the format and call letters were changed to new wave music/alternative rock classics KCNL, which was switched to alternative rock on January 15, 2001. KCNL's call letters were briefly changed to KMJO on October 14, 2005, and changed back to KCNL ten days later, though there was no format change involved. It was likely that Clear Channel Communications), the owners at the time, wanted to park the KMJO call letters temporarily.

On January 1, 2006, KCNL dropped alternative rock and flipped to Spanish. It was named "La Romántica" for a couple of months, but was later renamed "Enamorada 104.9". Ratings for the station had dropped from a 3.4 share to a 1.3 share during that time. Because of this, KCNL announced the return of the alternative rock format in late February 2007. The station relaunched on February 28, 2007, with "Beautiful Day" by U2 as the first song in the resurrected Channel 104.9 format. After 11 months without airstaff, on January 22, 2008, "Joe" returned to host afternoons.

On September 18, 2009, KCNL switched to the "La Preciosa" Spanish adult hits format. On March 2, 2010, Clear Channel Communications sold the station to Principle Broadcasting Network (San Jose, California) for $5 million. KCNL changed to the "iFM" Spanish-language variety format. On Saturday and Sunday nights from 8 pm to midnight, KCNL aired "Save Alternative", which also aired 24 hours a day on an HD2 channel and online at www.savealternative.com.

According to Radio Survivor, on March 30, 2012, Principle Broadcasting Network sold KCNL to the University of Southern California for $7.5 million. On May 2, 2012, it was announced that the Spanish-language format would end on May 28, 2012. On May 20, 2012, "Save Alternative" ceased broadcasting on KCNL-HD2. On May 25, 2012, the call letters were changed to KXSC and the format to classical music, broadcasting programming from KDFC to the South Bay and the Peninsula areas. The change took place three days earlier than originally planned.

== Additional frequencies ==
In addition to KXSC, the programming of KDFC is transmitted by these stations and translators to widen its broadcast area.

- KDFC — 90.3 FM, licensed to San Francisco, California
- KOSC — 89.9 FM, licensed to Angwin, California
- KDFG — 103.9 FM, licensed to Seaside, California
- K212AA — 90.3 FM, translator licensed to Los Gatos, California
- K223AJ — 92.5 FM, translator licensed to Lakeport, California
