= Calf Pasture Beach =

Park and beach in Norwalk, Connecticut, US

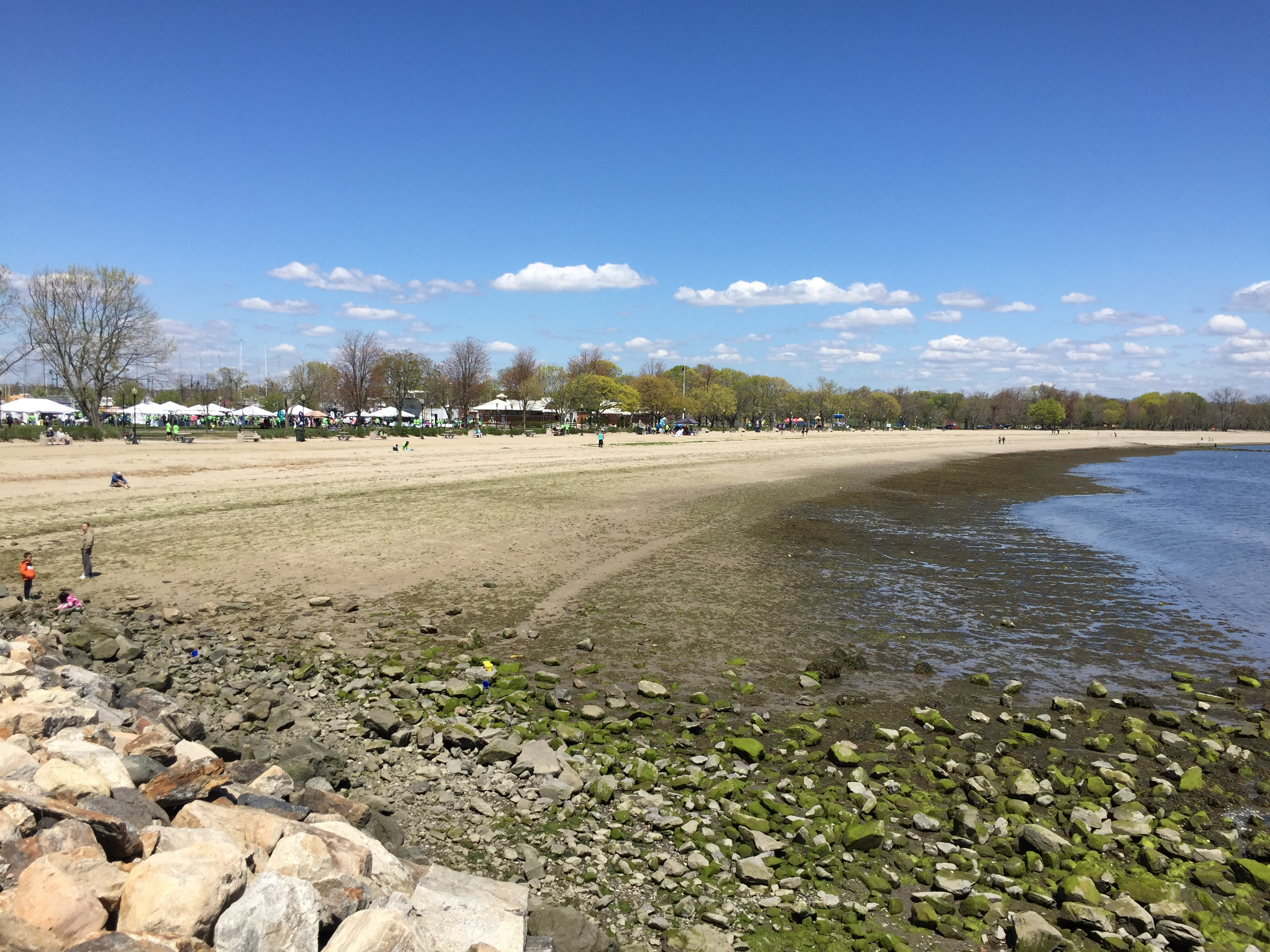
- Interactive map of Calf Pasture Beach
- Type: Park, beach
- Location: Norwalk, Connecticut
- Coordinates: 41.0825376°N 73.399359°W
- Operator: City of Norwalk
- Website: Calf Pasture Beach

Calf Pasture Beach is a historically significant park and beach in Norwalk, Connecticut.

The area of the park lands (including adjacent Shady Beach Park and Taylor Farm Park) is approximately .45 square miles.

The beach is accessible by road or by public transit; Norwalk Transit District provides direct bus service to the park and the East Norwalk Metro-North station is about one mile to the north along Calf Pasture Beach Road, Gregory Boulevard, and East Avenue. East Avenue also provides access to I-95 at exit 16.

== History ==
The area now known as Calf Pasture was used by Connecticut colony settlers in the 17th century as grazing land for cows.

The beach was used for disembarkation and encampment during the Tryon raid of the American Revolutionary War in 1779. After having conducted retribution raids at New Haven and Fairfield, William Tryon led 2,600 British troops by boat to Norwalk at approximately 5:00 p.m. on July 10, 1779. They landed near the Round Beach island at the Calf Pasture peninsula where they spent the night. The next day they set off on the burning of Norwalk that left only 6 houses standing after the raid.

In 1917 the Norwalk City legislature authorized the city to acquire and create a park at Calf Pasture Beach. Property condemnation to acquire the land was started in 1919. In 1922 the descendants of the Betts, Marvin, and Taylor families, who owned much of the adjoining property, donated their lands to the city. The park formally opened in 1924 while work on buildings and nearby roads was still underway.

Additional buildings and sidewalks were constructed at Calf Pasture in 1935 with funding provided by the Federal Emergency Relief Administration. Many of the buildings and sidewalks were washed away during the hurricane of September 1938. They were then replaced by Works Progress Administration workers.

Shady Beach was acquired in the 1960s. From 2000 to 2006 the Kayak for a Cause charitable fundraising event was held at Calf Pasture Beach. In 2007 that event was held at Veterans Park (also in East Norwalk) on the Connecticut shore. In 2008 it returned to Calf Pasture Beach.

All of the park facilities (Calf Pasture Beach, Shady Beach, and Taylor Farm) are still owned and maintained by the City of Norwalk.

== Facilities ==
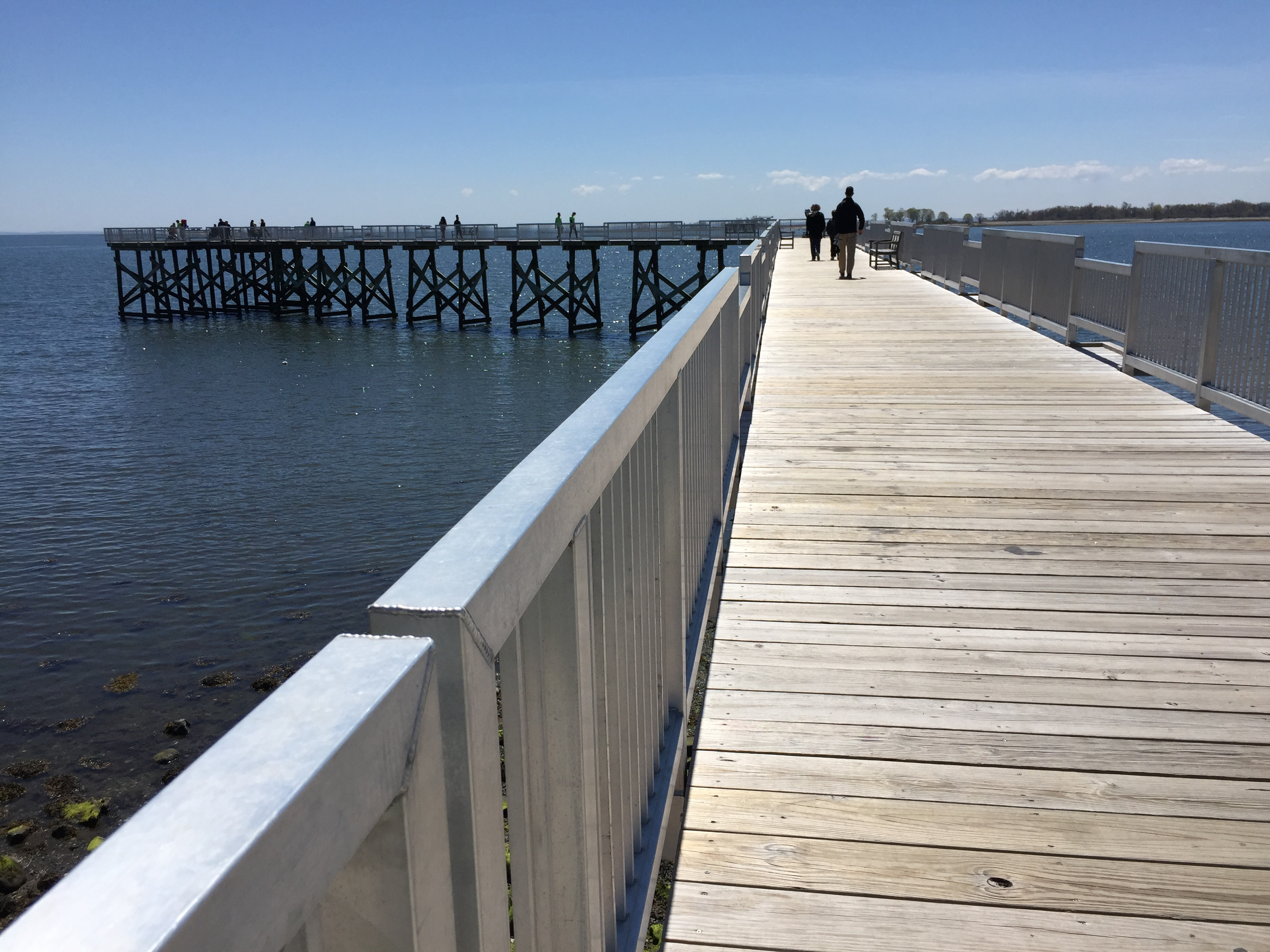
Captain William Clark Fishing Pier

The Calf Pasture Beach area has a large guarded beach, a fishing pier, a tree shaded playground, a small unpaved boat ramp (suited to cartop boat launches, not trailers), sand volleyball courts, bocce courts, a skateboard park, baseball diamonds (with lighting for nighttime games), accessible restrooms, and a restaurant maintained by Ripka Beach Cafe. During the spring and autumn seasons the parking lot at Calf Pasture Beach is used for kart racing. Adjacent Shady Beach Park offers an unmonitored beach, shaded picnic tables, grills, and additional restroom facilities. Adjacent to Shady Beach is Taylor Farm Park, with a tidal pool and grassy and wooded areas for dogwalking. Taylor Farm Park is the site of an annual Greenwich Kennel club dog show.

Sailboats and kayaks can be rented within the park at the Norwalk Sailing School, which also offers a small craft safety training program. Calf Pasture Beach is a major landmark along the Norwalk Islands Canoe/Kayak Trail. Boater safety courses are offered at the Dominic Lametta training center at U.S. Coast Guard Auxiliary Flotilla 72 at Calf Pasture.

The annual 4th of July fireworks show in Norwalk is held at Calf Pasture Beach.
