= KCRW =

Public radio station in Santa Monica, California, US

- Santa Monica, California; United States
- Broadcast area: Southern California; Greater Los Angeles Area
- Frequency: 89.9 MHz (HD Radio)

Programming
- Language: English
- Format: News; Talk (Public Radio); Eclectic Music
- Subchannels: HD2: Eclectic-24
- Affiliations: NPR; PRI; APM; BBC

Ownership
- Owner: Santa Monica College; (Santa Monica Community College District)

History
- First air date: 1947
- Call sign meaning: "College Radio Workshop" or "Corsair Radio West"

Technical information
- Licensing authority: FCC
- Facility ID: 59086
- Class: B
- ERP: 6,900 watts
- HAAT: 338 meters (1,109 ft)
- Transmitter coordinates: 34°7′8″N 118°23′30″W
- Repeater: See § Stations

Links
- Public license information: Public file; LMS
- Webcast: Live on-air; Live on-air (PLS); Music; Music (PLS); News; News (PLS)
- Website: kcrw.com

KCRW (89.9 FM) is an NPR member station broadcasting from the KCRW Media Center on the Center for Media and Design campus of Santa Monica College on Stewart Street in Santa Monica, California, where the station is licensed. KCRW airs original news and music programming in addition to programming from NPR and other affiliates. A network of repeaters and broadcast translators, as well as internet radio, allows the station to serve the Greater Los Angeles area and other communities in Southern California. The station's main transmitter is located in Los Angeles's Laurel Canyon district, adjacent to Mulholland Drive at the end of Briarcrest Road, and broadcasts in the HD radio format. It is one of two full NPR members in the Los Angeles area; Pasadena-based KPCC is the other.

== History ==
KCRW was founded in 1945 to train servicemen returning from World War II in the then-new technology, FM broadcasting—hence its call letters, which stand for College Radio Workshop. It was a charter member of NPR in 1970, making Santa Monica College the second community college to own a public radio or television station.

=== Ruth Seymour ===
Former KPFK program director Ruth Seymour became general manager in 1978 and retired in February 2010. Born Ruth Epstein to Russian-Polish Jewish immigrants, she grew up in the East Bronx, studied at Sholem Aleichem Folk School and the City College of New York, and married and divorced Jack Hirschman, adopting the name of her paternal great-grandfather in 1993 to become Ruth Hirschman Seymour. She developed a mix of music, news, and other spoken-word programming that now attracts over 500,000 listeners each week. She was also known for a feisty temperament and a spur-of-the-moment style that led to the nickname "Lady of the Iron Whim."

=== Jennifer Ferro ===
The current general manager is Jennifer Ferro. Ferro is also the President of the KCRW Foundation, which provides financial support and other resources to ensure that KCRW can maintain and expand its mission consistent with economic, social and technological developments. The KCRW Foundation board of directors is composed of business and community leaders; Monica J. Shilling, a partner at Kirkland & Ellis LLP, serves as chair.

The station airs programs from NPR, Public Radio International (PRI), American Public Media, and the BBC, a range of music programs and live in-studio performances, and locally produced news and culture programs. KCRW also airs programming created through their Independent Producer Project, a project KCRW created to support "the work of independent contributors," which includes programs like Strangers, UnFictional, and SoundsLA. The station has three live program streams—"On Air," "Eclectic 24" and "News 24"—and on-demand listening through the KCRW apps and podcasts.

In August 2013, KCRW released a new logo and brand design created by Los Angeles–based branding agency Troika Design Group.

== Programming ==
KCRW is an affiliate of NPR. Music programming includes the station's music program Morning Becomes Eclectic.

Warren Olney hosts the station's news and public affairs programs, To the Point (nationally distributed by Public Radio International).

KCRW covers the Southern California film industry with programs including The Business with Kim Masters, The Treatment with Elvis Mitchell, Martini Shot with Rob Long, and film reviews from Pulitzer Prize winning Wall Street Journal film critic Joe Morgenstern.

Music programs feature an eclectic array of songs from around the globe, particularly on the daily music program Morning Becomes Eclectic and the daytime weekend line-up. At night, music such as house, progressive, and electronic dance music are the main styles on shows formerly known as Metropolis and Nocturna. KCRW dropped all program names except Morning Becomes Eclectic and Strictly Jazz in 2008. Three of the station's previous music directors currently have programs on the air at KCRW.

Local and regional touring artists can send recordings to KCRW for consideration of airplay.

KCRW airs Santa Monica City Council meetings live when they are held. Because of the nature of the repeater network, Santa Monica City Council meetings can be heard throughout the Southern California region reaching out to approximately 150 mi (240 km).

Before its current host, Evan Kleiman, took over as host, the KCRW show Good Food was parodied on Saturday Night Live in a recurring character sketch series, Delicious Dish, with Ana Gasteyer and Molly Shannon.

Since 2013, KCRW has put on the annual Radio Race, a 24-hour competition in which participants can write, record, and edit a nonfiction radio story. Here Be Monsters, a podcast about fears and the unknown, got its start on KCRW after winning Radio Race.

== Programs, a selected table ==
| Program | Format | Host | Podcast |
|---|---|---|---|
| Art Talk | Talk: Art Reviews | Edward Goldman | Yes |
| Bookworm | Talk: In-depth author interviews | Michael Silverblatt | Yes |
| DnA: Design & Architecture | Talk: culture/civic aesthetics | Frances Anderton | Yes |
| Good Food | Talk: cuisine | Evan Kleiman | Yes |
| LA Observed | News/talk: local media, politics and culture | Kevin Roderick | Yes |
| Left, Right & Center | News/talk: analysis and punditry | David Greene | Yes |
| Press Play | News/talk: local news & culture | Madeleine Brand | Yes |
| UnFictional | Talk: documentary/storytelling | Bob Carlson | Yes |
| Bodies | Talk: documentary/storytelling | Allison Behringer | Yes |
| Film Reviews | Talk: film reviews | Joe Morgenstern | Yes |
| Martini Shot | Talk: Hollywood/pop culture | Rob Long | Yes |
| The Business | News/talk: Show business | Kim Masters | Yes |
| The Treatment | Talk: Film/TV, more | Elvis Mitchell | Yes |
| To the Point | News/talk: analysis | Warren Olney | Yes |
| Which Way, L.A.? | News/talk: local affairs | Warren Olney | Yes |
| Metropolis | Music: Electronic, Dance | Jason Bentley | |
| Morning Becomes Eclectic | Music: Adult album alternative | Anthony Valadez; Novena Carmel | |
| FREAKS ONLY | Music: New Music | Travis Holcombe | |
| Garth Trinidad | Music: Electronic | Garth Trinidad | |
| Raul Campos | Music: Eclectic | Raul Campos | |
| Anne Litt | Music: Eclectic | Anne Litt | |
| Chris Douridas | Music: New Music | Chris Douridas | |
| Liza Richardson | Music: Eclectic | Liza Richardson | |
| Gary Calamar | Music: Eclectic | Gary Calamar | |
| Henry Rollins | Music: Wild Ride | Henry Rollins | |
| Dan Wilcox | Music: Eclectic | Dan Wilcox | |
| Jason Kramer | Music: Eclectic | Jason Kramer | |
| Eric J. Lawrence | Music: Eclectic | Eric J. Lawrence | |
| Mario Cotto | Music: Eclectic | Mario Cotto | |
| Anthony Valadez | Music: Eclectic | Anthony Valadez | |
| Travis Holcombe | Music: Eclectic | Travis Holcombe | |
| Francesca Harding | Music: Eclectic | Francesca Harding | |
| Jeremy Sole | Music: Eclectic | Jeremy Sole | |
| Aaron Byrd | Music: Eclectic | Aaron Byrd | |
| John Moses | Music: Eclectic | John Moses | |
| LeRoy Downs | Music: Eclectic | LeRoy Downs | |
| Mathieu Schreyer | Music: Eclectic | Dan Wilcox | |
| Strictly Jazz | Music: Jazz | Bo Leibowitz | |
| SiLVA | Music: Eclectic | SiLVA | |
| The Reggae Beat | Music: Reggae | Roger Steffans and Hank Holmes | |
| Stepping Out | Music: African/World | Michael Hodgson | |
| The Lab | Music: Eclectic | Marion Hodges; Valida Carroll; Karene Daniel | |
| Regular Guest Hosts | Music: Eclectic | Chris Muckley; Tobi | |

== Influence and accolades ==
KCRW's flagship program is Morning Becomes Eclectic, a three-hour daily music program that has aired for more than 30 years. Historically, the show host is also the station's music director. Isabel Holt created the show in 1978. Tom Schnabel hosted the show from 1979 to 1990. In November 1990, Chris Douridas took over the show, hosting until April 1998. Nic Harcourt was in the seat from 1998 until December 1, 2008, coming from WDST FM 100.1 in Woodstock, N.Y. At WDST Harcourt successfully transitioned a traditional Triple A station to a cutting-edge trendsetting Alternative station in the shadow of New York City. Longtime KCRW DJ Jason Bentley, known for his "Metropolis" nighttime avant garde dance program, is the former host and music director. That position (morning host and MD respectively) will be split in two on August 30, 2019, with Bentley relinquishing both duties after 10 years, but will continue hosting Metropolis.

KCRW has given initial exposure to artists such as Coldplay, Norah Jones, Sigur Ros, Damien Rice, David Gray and Lorde. KCRW programming has won numerous awards and accolades, including the Golden Pylon Award in 2011 and 2014, a PRNDI Award in 2013 and 2014, The Edward R. Murrow Award in 2014 and 2015, the Webby Award in 2015, an APTRA Award in 2015, The Gracie Award in 2016, and seven first place awards from the Los Angeles Press Club for the year of 2015.

Several hosts have extended their careers into music supervision for both film and television, including Chris Douridas (American Beauty, Shrek 2 and House of Lies), Liza Richardson (Friday Night Lights and The Kids Are All Right), and Gary Calamar, the music supervisor for HBO's True Blood and Six Feet Under.

Streaming media is now prominent at the station, which streams thousands of hours of content each week. KCRW provides three different live streams: the live broadcast, a 24-hour music service, and a 24-hour news service. Streams are available through web browsers, with alternate streams offered using the PLS file format, which can be played using software such as iTunes, Winamp and RealPlayer. The music service and news service are also included as channels in AOL Radio. The station also archives its talk and music programs for listeners to stream at their convenience, and offers podcasts of in-studio performance and talk programs.

KCRW has members across the country and the station regularly sponsors live music events throughout the United States and in Canada.

In a 2021 L.A. Podcast interview, former staffer Cerise Castle accused the station of "microaggressions, gaslighting, and blatant racism." The station investigated the accusations with the help of a law firm. In a statement, the station said: "Ultimately, several of the claims were found to be unsubstantiated or not corroborated. But we take all claims very seriously."

== Events ==
KCRW promotes a great deal of live music events nationally, featuring both established and emerging artists. In April 2011, KCRW promoted and sponsored the controversial graffiti exhibit entitled "Art in the Streets" at the Museum of Contemporary Art, Los Angeles (MoCA). The Los Angeles Times reported an increase in tagging around MoCA after the exhibit opened to the public.

== Stations ==
KCRW programming is relayed by five full-power stations. However, KERW—serving San Luis Obispo—is a full-time HD1 simulcast partner with KCRW-HD2's "Eclectic 24" music programming. "Eclectic 24" is heard on the HD2 signals of the four other stations, as it does on KCRW itself.

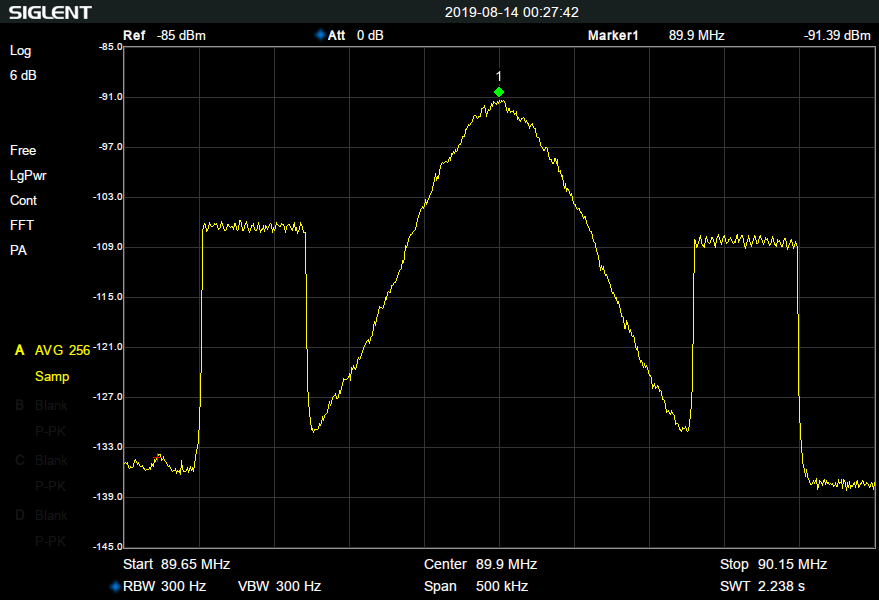
The RF spectrum occupied by KCRW. The center portion is the analog FM signal, the rectangular portions on the outside are the digital HD radio signal.

| Call sign | Frequency | City of license | FID | Class | ERP (W) | Height (m (ft)) |
|---|---|---|---|---|---|---|
| KCRI | 89.3 FM (HD) | Indio, California | 59087 | B1 | 3,200 | 174 m (571 ft) |
| KCRY | 88.1 FM (HD) | Mojave, California | 59092 | B1 | 10,500 | −29 m (−95 ft) |
| KCRU | 89.1 FM (HD) | Oxnard, California | 59085 | A | 850 | 260 m (850 ft) |
| KDRW | 88.7 FM (HD) | Santa Barbara, California | 69085 | B | 12,000 | 264 m (866 ft) |

The call letters of KCRI, KCRU, KCRY, and KDRW are identified at the top of each hour alongside those of KCRW, as are the frequencies of those stations and their transmitters.

KCRW also directly feeds three low-power translators, while other stations feed four additional translators.

| Call sign | Frequency | City of license | FID | Relays |
|---|---|---|---|---|
| K215BA | 90.9 FM | Beaumont, California | 59090 | KCRW |
| K225BA | 92.9 FM | Borrego Springs, California | 141934 | KCRI |
| K261AC | 100.1 FM | China Lake, California | 28585 | KCRY |
| K272DI | 102.3 FM | Fillmore, California | 59089 | KCRU |
| K295AH | 106.9 FM | Goleta, California | 84739 | KCRU |
| K209CN | 89.7 FM | Gorman, California | 76970 | KCRW |
| K210CL | 89.9 FM | Lemon Grove, California | 90642 | KCRW |
| K271AC | 102.1 FM | Ojai, California | 59093 | KCRU |
| K207FA | 89.3 FM | Twentynine Palms, California | 83662 | KCRI |

KCRW also has applications pending for new translators on 88.5 in Mojave, 89.9 in Temecula, 90.1 in Baker, 90.3 FM in Barstow, and 105.7 FM in Julian.

Previous translators (now off the air and licenses returned to the FCC) operated on 88.3 FM in Palmdale, 89.1 FM in Camarillo, 90.9 FM in Palm Springs, and 100.1 in China Lake. Another former translator, K296AI, was the only KCRW translator not owned by the station. It is operated by Indian Wells Valley TV Booster, Inc., which also operates translators that rebroadcast Los Angeles–area television stations in the Ridgecrest area. That translator currently rebroadcasts KMZT.

In February 2014, KCRW announced that it would buy Santa Barbara station KDB (93.7 FM), currently a classical music station, for $1 million. The transaction will allow KCRW to begin using another Santa Barbara station, KQSC (88.7 FM) as a repeater for KCRW's programming, while transferring KUSC's classical programming from KQSC to KDB, thereby preserving KDB's role as Santa Barbara's classical station.

=== KCRW Berlin ===
On September 13, 2017, partner station, KCRW Berlin, was awarded a broadcast license in Berlin, Germany, on 104.1 MHz. This license and frequency had previously been held by NPR Berlin. The station had a website at kcrwberlin.com. However, KCRW Berlin ceased broadcasting on December 13, 2020, due to the economic disruptions caused by the coronavirus pandemic.
