= KDSC =

KUSC classical music public radio station in Thousand Oaks, California

- Thousand Oaks, California; United States
- Broadcast area: Ventura County, California
- Frequency: 91.1 MHz (HD Radio)

Programming
- Format: Classical music
- Network: Classical California

Ownership
- Owner: University of Southern California

History
- First air date: December 4, 1979
- Former call signs: KCPB (1979–2004)

Technical information
- Licensing authority: FCC
- Facility ID: 69116
- Class: B
- ERP: 4,800 watts
- HAAT: 390 meters (1,280 ft)
- Transmitter coordinates: 34°24′47″N 119°11′10″W

Links
- Public license information: Public file; LMS
- Webcast: Listen live
- Website: classicalcalifornia.org

KDSC (91.1 FM) is a radio station licensed to Thousand Oaks, California, United States. The station is owned by the University of Southern California (USC) and is part of its Classical California network. This station was established as a separate public radio station for the Conejo Valley and began broadcasting as KCPB on December 4, 1979. In its short life, it struggled financially. USC, whose classical radio activities were until then confined to KUSC in Los Angeles, acquired the station and began repeating its signal there.

== KCPB: Public radio for the Conejo Valley ==
In 1972, Al Miller, an instructor at Moorpark College, began organizing with the goal of bringing a public radio station to Ventura County and surrounding areas. He first envisioned a community college station, but the Ventura County Community College District was not interested. Public radio stations from other areas had poor to nonexistent reception in areas of the western San Fernando Valley and Ventura County. In 1976, Conejo Public Broadcasters was formed and received funding from the Corporation for Public Broadcasting. The group proposed to locate the transmitter for the new station on Sulphur Mountain near Ojai. On February 11, 1977, it filed with the Federal Communications Commission (FCC) for authority to build a new radio station on 91.1 MHz, which the commission granted on January 23, 1978. By that July, the station had reincorporated as KCPB, Inc., and construction was in progress on studios in Westlake Village. More funding was received from the Corporation for Public Broadcasting and Santa Barbara Foundation, but the startup of KCPB was delayed primarily by technical considerations regarding the transmitter facility, which was built to be shared by two stations and delayed by a county environmental impact report.

From offices on Thousand Oaks Boulevard, KCPB began broadcasting on December 4, 1979. Its programming output consisted primarily of NPR material while it worked to develop hoped-for local programming. It was the only public radio station in the area owned by a community licensee instead of an educational institution. Nearly immediately, the new station ran into financial difficulties, as the Corporation for Public Broadcasting denied the station's grant application. Four months after going on air, KCPB had overdue loans and trouble making payroll; Miller spoke of "intense problems" and a "crisis state" in KCPB's finances. The primary hurdle for public funding was the Corporation for Public Broadcasting's requirement that stations have five full-time staffers to qualify for grants. The station lacked the money for that—funds were diverted to pay for rent and utilities—and also needed to raise enough funds locally to qualify for matching grants. Most station operations were conducted by unpaid volunteers, many of them Moorpark College students. The KCPB signal also suffered from technical limitations resulting from interference from the co-channel XETRA-FM in Tijuana. The presence of the Tijuana station dictated the transmitter siting, to comply with channel spacing requirements, and limited KCPB's signal and fundraising. At one point, KCPB considered applying for 88.7 MHz in Santa Barbara and converting the Thousand Oaks service to a translator. However, the frequency in Santa Barbara had already been applied for by the University of Southern California (USC), owner of Los Angeles classical music station KUSC. In October 1981, the station installed a translator to extend service to Santa Barbara on 89.5 MHz.

== Acquisition by KUSC ==
On October 30, 1981, it was announced that USC would acquire KCPB to extend its service into the Conejo area. It was the poor signal from KUSC in that area that had motivated Miller to form the station in the first place. Miller was relieved that a sale would result in payments to the station's creditors, ranging from a bank to landscapers. The transfer received FCC approval in April 1982, and KCPB began simulcasting KUSC's programming. Though KCPB had not been foreseen in KUSC's plans to expand throughout Southern California, the university explored options to provide Conejo Valley programming on the station.

In 2004, KCPB changed its call sign to KDSC.
