= KDRW =

Simulcasts KCRW, Santa Monica, CA
- Santa Barbara, California; United States
- Broadcast area: Santa Barbara and Ventura Counties
- Frequency: 88.7 MHz (HD Radio)
- Branding: KCRW Santa Barbara

Programming
- Format: Public radio and talk
- Subchannels: HD2: Eclectic-24
- Affiliations: NPR

Ownership
- Owner: Santa Monica Community College District

History
- First air date: January 1985
- Former call signs: KSCA (1982–1989); KFAC (1989–2004); KQSC (2004–2014); KDRW-FM (2014)
- Call sign meaning: Disambiguation of parent station KCRW

Technical information
- Licensing authority: FCC
- Facility ID: 69085
- Class: B
- ERP: 12,000 watts
- HAAT: 264 meters (866 ft)
- Transmitter coordinates: 34°27′55″N 119°40′42″W

Links
- Public license information: Public file; LMS
- Webcast: Listen live
- Website: kcrw.com

KDRW (88.7 FM) is a non-commercial radio station licensed to Santa Barbara, California, United States. Owned by Santa Monica College, it operates as a simulcast of KCRW, with occasional programming originated locally from its studios on the campus of Antioch University Santa Barbara.

KDRW's transmitter is sited off Gibraltar Road in Santa Barbara, and broadcasts in HD Radio.

== History ==
In January 1985, the station signed on as KSCA. Owned by the University of Southern California (USC), the non-commercial KSCA broadcast classical music programming as a simulcast of KUSC. The call letters changed to KFAC in 1989, the call sign having been donated when KFAC in Los Angeles ceased classical music programming, then to KQSC in 2004.

In February 2014, public radio station KCRW, based in Santa Monica, California, purchased Santa Barbara classical station KDB for $1 million. The acquisition allowed KCRW to extend its reach into the Santa Barbara area. With the Santa Barbara market facing the possible elimination of classical radio programming, USC purchased KDB and that station began relaying KUSC's programming. Upon closing the transaction on August 27, 2014 — a deal which also saw KQSC going to KCRW — KQSC changed its call sign to KDRW-FM and began simulcasting KCRW. The station's call letters changed again on October 1, 2014, to simply KDRW.

Unlike a typical repeater station that simply rebroadcasts its parent station's programming, KDRW offers some locally originated programming. The station's Santa Barbara studios are located on the campus of Antioch University Santa Barbara. Local news reports are made in cooperation with the Santa Barbara Independent weekly newspaper and a local nonprofit organization specializing in investigative journalism.
