= Garth Trinidad =

Music supervisor and radio disc jockey

Garth Trinidad is a music supervisor & radio disc jockey of electronic music in Los Angeles, California on KCRW. He started hosting a show on KCRW in 1996, after years of volunteer work at the station. 18 years later, his drive-time show continues to be a mainstay in the LA radio market. Trinidad attended Otis College of Art and Design. He was the music supervisor for the Emmy Award-winning HBO series Entourage. As a music pundit, he has provided commentary for PBS, NPR, KTLA and KABC.

== Awards ==
1999 Rolling Stone: Best Dance Club "Kneedeep in The Countdown"
2000 LA Weekly: Best Radio Program "Chocolate City"
2001 LA Weekly: Best Radio Program "Chocolate City"
2001 LA Weekly: Best DJ - Selector
2002 LA Weekly: Best Radio Program Nominee "Chocolate City"
2003 LA Weekly: Best Radio Program "Chocolate City" (Best of LA issue)
