= KDB (FM) =

- Santa Barbara, California; United States
- Broadcast area: Santa Barbara County and Ventura County
- Frequency: 93.7 MHz

Programming
- Format: Classical
- Network: Classical California

Ownership
- Owner: University of Southern California

History
- First air date: February 14, 1960
- Call sign meaning: Dorothy Barnes (wife of KDB (1490 AM) owner George Barnes in 1929)

Technical information
- Licensing authority: FCC
- Facility ID: 51169
- Class: B
- ERP: 12,500 watts
- HAAT: 265 meters (869 ft)
- Transmitter coordinates: 34°27′57.9″N 119°40′40.4″W

Links
- Public license information: Public file; LMS
- Webcast: Listen live
- Website: classicalcalifornia.org

KDB (93.7 FM) is a non-commercial radio station licensed to Santa Barbara, California, United States, and serving Santa Barbara County and Ventura County. Owned by the University of Southern California, it is part of Classical California, a statewide classical music network, and acting as a simulcast of KUSC (91.5 FM) in Los Angeles.

KDB's transmitter is sited off Gibraltar Road in Santa Barbara, located among the towers for other Santa Barbara FM and TV stations.

== History ==
=== Beautiful and classical music ===
KDB-FM first signed on the air on February 14, 1960. It was the sister station to KDB (1490 AM). The AM station had held the KDB call sign since 1929, an era where many stations were granted three-letter call signs. This is why today's KDB still retains unusual call letters for an FM station. KDB-AM-FM were Santa Barbara's first 24-hour stations. The stations were bought in 1971 by the Pacific Broadcasting Company, consisting of Bob Scott, Harvey Pool, and Dick Marsh. After programming American show tunes and beautiful music for nine years, KDB-FM changed its format to classical music in 1980.

A competing classical music station appeared in Santa Barbara in 1985. Signing on that year was KSCA, a full-power non-commercial station owned by the University of Southern California (USC) that served as a repeater of KUSC in Los Angeles. KSCA's call letters changed to KFAC in 1991, then to KQSC in 2004.

=== Ownership Changes ===
The KDB-AM-FM combo was split in November 1990 due to an ownership dispute. Pacific Broadcasting sold the AM station, then known as KSPE, to Spectacular Broadcasting for $302,000. Meanwhile, KDB-FM remained with Bob Scott, his son Roby, and Pool.

=== Non-profit status ===
Through the 1980s and 1990s, many commercial classical stations around the U.S. were sold and their formats changed to more mass-appeal musical genres; others, like WQXR-FM in New York City and WCRB in Boston, were converted to non-profit status. In 2001, Michael Towbes, David Anderson, and Jean and Barry Schuyler bought KDB-FM with the goal of selling the station to a nonprofit organization that would keep the classical format and local orientation. This happened in November 2003, when the Santa Barbara Foundation purchased the station through a generous donation from Towbes.

In 2010, KDB embarked on a three-year strategic plan to enhance and grow its service to the community with programming that enriched the lives of those who listen. KDB added a Features Producer who created two to three interviews and features per week on the performing, visual and literary arts, as well as the work of local nonprofit organizations. In 2011, KDB entered the world of social media, adding a monthly e-newsletter and Facebook page.

In October 2013, the Santa Barbara Foundation announced that it had put KDB up for sale. In a statement, the station said that it was unable to attract enough revenue from contributing listeners to support KDB's operations, despite an increase in membership revenue. The foundation hoped to sell the station at a discount to interests that would retain the classical format, citing the "continuing community benefit" of continuing this programming. However, the organization also considered full-price offers from groups that would program a format of their choosing, in which case the proceeds would go toward an endowment to support classical music in the area.

=== KCRW and KUSC ownership ===
In February 2014, public radio station KCRW in Santa Monica announced that it would buy KDB for $1 million; the sale price was amended to $1.3 million in June. The transaction would allow KCRW to shift its Santa Barbara broadcast coverage from a weak FM translator to the full-powered 88.7 signal then licensed to KQSC. USC moved its classical music programming from 88.7 to KDB's 93.7 frequency, thus continuing KDB's role as Santa Barbara's classical station. On August 28, 2014, the sale was finalized and KDB began simulcasting KUSC's classical format.

KCRW donated much of the KDB studio equipment to KBUU-LP, a startup community radio station in Malibu. The vintage 1990 broadcast board remains in continuous use at KBUU, with an old KDB logo and its baton-wielding penguin affixed.

== See also ==
- List of three-letter broadcast call signs in the United States
