= Warren Olney IV =

American broadcast journalist

Warren Olney IV is an American broadcast journalist. He was the host and executive producer of the nationally syndicated Public Radio International weekday afternoon program To the Point, which originated at Santa Monica, California public radio station KCRW. The daily program ended on November 10, 2017. As of November 13, To the Point will be a weekly podcast heard exclusively on KCRW's digital platforms. From 1992 to January 2016, Olney hosted KCRW's local public affairs show, Which Way, L.A.?

Olney received a BA in English at Amherst College and taught broadcast journalism at USC from 1976 to 1982. From 1966 to 1969, Olney worked as a reporter for Washington D.C. CBS affiliate WTOP-TV (now WUSA-TV). After leaving WTOP-TV, he went to Los Angeles and worked at television stations KNXT/KCBS-TV-Channel 2 (1969-1975 and 1986–1989), KNBC-Channel 4 (1975–1981), KABC-TV-Channel 7 (1981–1986) and KCOP-Channel 13 (1989–1991), as well as engaging in many other print and broadcast journalist duties. He is the only two-time winner of the Los Angeles Society of Professional Journalists Distinguished Journalist award, which has been presented annually since 1976. He received it in 1985 for his work with KABC-TV and in 1998 for his work with KCRW.

Olney has four children and three stepchildren. He also has six grandchildren.

In January 2012, Olney was honored with a Lifetime Achievement Award at the 62nd annual Golden Mike Awards ceremony held by the Radio & Television News Association of Southern California. His father, Warren Olney III, was an attorney, and his grandfather, Warren Olney Jr., was a Justice of the California Supreme Court.
