= To the Point =

Radio program

- Genre: Public affairs
- Running time: ca. 54 min.
- Country of origin: United States
- Language(s): English
- Home station: KCRW-FM
- Syndicates: PRI (until 2017)
- Hosted by: Warren Olney
- Created by: KCRW-FM and PRI
- Produced by: Katie Cooper, Christine Detz, Evan George, Benjamin Gottlieb, Jenny Hamel, Sasa Woodruff
- Executive producer(s): Warren Olney
- Recording studio: KCRW in Santa Monica, CA
- Original release: 2001 – November 10, 2017 (radio) * November 13, 2017 - present (podcast only)
- Audio format: Stereophonic
- Website: www.kcrw.com/news/shows/to-the-point
- Podcast: www.kcrw.com/podcasts/podcasts

To the Point was an hour-long public affairs radio program co-produced by KCRW in Santa Monica, California and Public Radio International. The program originated at KCRW at 1 pm Pacific Time each weekday. Award-winning journalist Warren Olney hosts the show; it was syndicated nationwide by PRI and aired in 15 states and Washington, D.C. by Public Radio International. KCRW continues to podcast the program monthly.

== Format ==
The program begins with its theme music, a clip from John Coltrane's A Love Supreme. Olney then introduces the topics for the day's program, followed by a break for carrier stations to play syndicated news headlines, typically provided by NPR.

In the opening segment, Olney discusses a recent or breaking news development with a guest, typically a newspaper journalist. The journalist joins Warren by phone, and the segment lasts about 10 minutes.

The following segment, which occupies most of the show, features a roundtable discussion of a topic of national or international interest, including issues of politics, policy, war, and science. Unlike most news programs, which tend to interview newsmakers, To the Point instead interviews "experts" – typically think tank members, professors in related fields, or observers from non-profit groups, who have comprehensive understandings of the events. Olney moderates the discussion, beginning with one guest and adding one every few minutes; typically, three commentators eventually join Olney during this main segment, all by phone. The segment is split in half by Miles Davis's "Blue in Green."

During the program's final segment, called "Reporter's Notebook," Olney interviews a newspaper or magazine journalist by phone about an ongoing story, allowing the reporter to give a thorough narrative of the events. This occupies the last eight to 10 minutes of the show.

The show closes with Olney crediting the show's rotating cast of producers and engineers, thanking the Coltrane family, and signing off with, "This has been To the Point from Public Radio International."

== Show format in breaking events ==
When major national or international events occur, the show will occasionally scrap its pre-scheduled main segment in favor of bringing in commentators on the breaking stories.

Though the live program beamed by satellite to carrier stations at 11 am, KCRW aired it taped at 1pm, following The World.

== Notes and references ==
- http://www.kcrw.com/schedule
