= Kayak for a Cause =

Coordinates: 41.0841°N 73.395°W

Kayak for a Cause (Carpe Paddlum: "Seize the Paddle")

Kayak for a Cause was a non-profit kayaking fundraiser that took place from 2001 to 2012 on Long Island Sound on the eastern coast of the United States. A group of several-hundred kayakers would cross the Sound from Norwalk, Connecticut, to the north shore of Long Island and return as they raise money for local and national charities.

The route for the crossing is 12.5 miles long and leaves from Calf Pasture Beach in East Norwalk, Connecticut, and lands in Crab Meadow Park in Northport, New York. Depending on factors such as tides, current, and wind, the route can take an average paddler between two and four hours to complete.

To participate in the event, the organization required that paddlers be "comfortable in very open waters", and in reasonably good shape. All first-time participants were required to attend a kayak safety course a few weeks before the launch.

Each year, the KFAC organization picked five charities in Connecticut and Long Island. In 2007, for instance, the charities were The Hole in the Wall Gang Camp, Outward Bound of Connecticut, Cancer Care of Connecticut, Courage to Speak Foundation, a drug prevention organization for children; and Save the Sound, an environmental organization. Paddlers could pick one to sponsor in the past, however, due to the growth of the event over time, it had become more logistically feasible for the board to elect on how to split donations among the selected charities.

== History ==
Kayak for a Cause was started by Scott Carlin and Miles Spencer in Norwalk, Connecticut, in August 2001. The pair were bet $50 to cross Long Island Sound in kayaks. They made it across (and back) and have yet to collect the $50 bet. Bragging about their accomplishment at a local bar, many of the patrons agreed that they would bet hundreds of dollars to see them do it again. They decided to decline the bets, but take the money and donate it to charity.

For the next two years they invited others on the annal trek and started raising funds for charities. In 2002 there were a total of eight participating paddlers and six news organizations covered the event, which also had a chase boat for safety.

In 2005, Nautica and GQ magazine approached Carlin and Spencer to suggest that the two companies become sponsors. Peter Hunsinger, vice president and publisher of GQ and a resident of nearby New Canaan, Connecticut, participated in the event as a kayaker. Land Rover and other companies also joined in. Corporate sponsorship, with its organization and publicity, helped the event to grow in one year from 45 in 2005 to 178 paddlers in 2006.

As of 2006, Kayak for a Cause raised more than half a million dollars for charity. The 2006 event had 303 participants which set a Guinness World Record for the most sea kayaks launched simultaneously. The last several years have included an after-party on Calf Pasture Beach in Norwalk, featuring a concert by big-name artists and a silent auction.

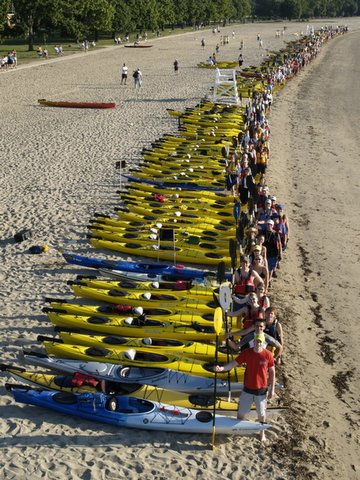
KFAC VI Launch

The 2007 event, had 313 participants and started at 7:30 a.m. on July 28, 2007, and was the first to use Veterans Park in East Norwalk rather than Calf Pasture Beach. The move came at the suggestion of Norwalk city officials and it allowed for expansion of the event, especially the late-afternoon and evening beach party. In 2007, the Neville Brothers and Ryan Shaw played at the charity carnival at the beach party. A total of 17 "pasta parties" were held in Fairfield County restaurants two nights before the event to bolster the participants.

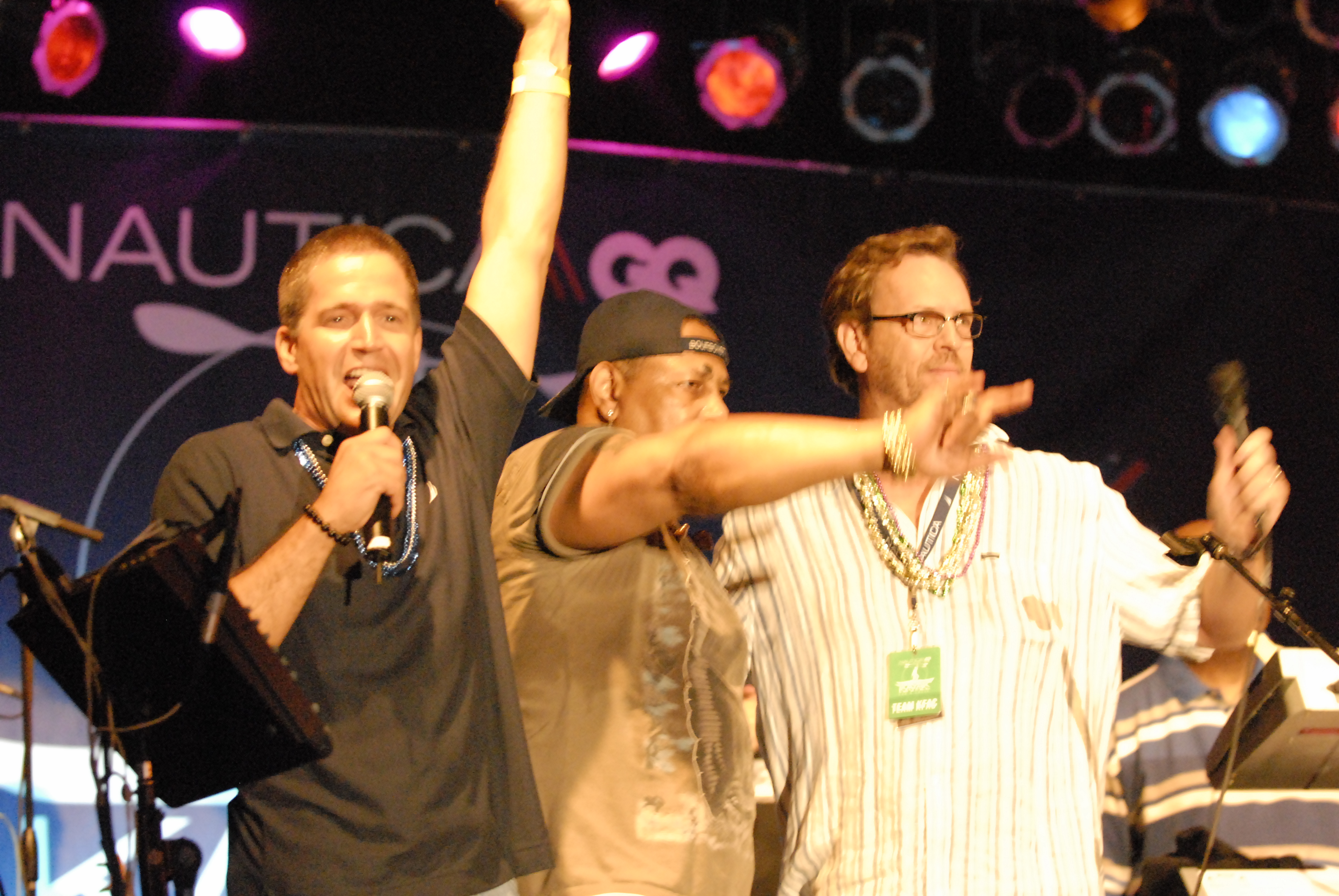
KFAC VII onstage with Aaron Neville

In 2008 event returned to Calf Pasture Beach and featured the Wailers Band.

In 2009, the direction of the paddle was reversed and the group launched from Crab Meadow Beach in Huntington, Long Island and landed in Norwalk. Musical guests included Ryan Shaw and headliner Donavon Frankenreiter.

In 2010, the organization celebrated its tenth year, having escorted over 1,600 paddlers across the sound, recording over 20,000 donations and raising over $2,000,000 for local and national charities. The Beach Party featured Dickey Betts & Great Southern, with opening band Ten Feet Deep. Charities that received support since inception include Save the Sound, Hole in the Wall Gang, Cancer Care, Outward Bound, Canine Companions, Builders Beyond Borders, Make a Wish, Courage to Speak, and Cardinal Sheehan Youth Center.

In 2013, Kayak for a Cause elected to scuttle the fleet in a one-day kayak sale and donate the remaining proceeds to charities before changing its name and mission. The CAA Foundation intends to foster a unique community by providing networking, mentoring and resources for promising young entrepreneurs.
