= Oren Lavie =

Israeli musical artist

Oren Lavie אורן לביא
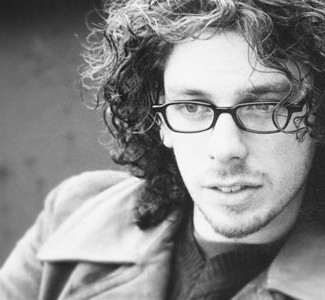

Background information
- Born: Oren Lavie; Tel Aviv, Israel
- Occupations: Musician, songwriter, author, theatre director, video director
- Instruments: Vocals, piano
- Website: www.orenlavie.com

Oren Lavie is an Israeli songwriter, author, theatre and video director. His music video for "Her Morning Elegance" earned a 2009 Grammy Award nomination for "Best Short Form Music Video" and has become a YouTube hit with over 35 million views to date.

Lavie released his debut studio album, The Opposite Side of the Sea, on March 10, 2009, in the United States. He is the winner of the ASCAP Foundation Award for promising lyricist. His first book for children, The Bear Who Wasn't There, was published in 2014 and has since been translated to numerous languages. Lavie's second studio album, Bedroom Crimes, was released in May 2017.

== Life and career ==
Lavie was born in Tel Aviv, Israel, where he spent his youth. In 1997, his play Sticks in Wheels and his production of it were awarded the main prizes at the Acco Festival of Alternative Israeli Theatre. The production played in Tel Aviv during 1998. In that year he went to London to study theatre directing at the London Academy of Music and Dramatic Art (LAMDA). After his graduation, two of his plays were produced in various London theatres. They already contained several songs written and composed by him.

In 2001, Lavie moved to New York City where he directed several workshops on his plays, and gradually shifted his focus to songwriting. In 2003, he relocated to Berlin and began recording his first album, The Opposite Side of the Sea, which he self-produced. The album was released in Europe in January and February 2007, and in the United States in March 2009.

In 2009, his stop motion style music video, "Her Morning Elegance", featuring Shir Shomron, an Israeli-born actress/model, achieved significant popularity on YouTube, receiving over 30 million views. Lavie produced and co-directed the video with Merav and Yuval Natan, which was shot in 48 hours without a break.

"Her Morning Elegance" was screened at Cannes Lion, SXSW, LA Film Festival, Vienna Shorts and many other film festivals worldwide.

Oren performed "Her Morning Elegance" on Jimmy Kimmel, singing with a giant puppet.

Oren appears on Chimes of Freedom: Songs of Bob Dylan Honoring 50 Years of Amnesty International, covering Dylan's "4th Time Around."

His first book for children, The Bear Who Wasn't There, was first published in 2014 and has since been translated to numerous languages, and published throughout the world.

== Discography ==
Studio albums

- The Opposite Side of the Sea (2007)
- Bedroom Crimes (2017)

Singles

- "Her Morning Elegance" (2007)
- "Did You Really Say No?" (2017)

Other songs

- "A Dance 'Round the Memory Tree" was featured on The Chronicles of Narnia: Prince Caspian (2008) film soundtrack.
- "4th Time Around" was featured on The Chimes Of Freedom: The Songs of Bob Dylan Honoring 50 Years of Amnesty International (2012).
- "Balada Bein Kochavim (The Ballad of Jupiter and Venus)" was featured on Layla Shel Kochavim (A Stars' Night), an album of Hebrew songs performed (and possibly written or co-written) by Israeli artists, among others (2012).
- "Transparent Wall (חומה שקופה)" was featured on an album of songs in Hebrew by Israeli artists, called Yale & Yevo: The Tribute Project To The Songs Of Yoram Taharlev, part 2 (2022).

== Books ==
The Bear Who Wasn't There (And The Fabulous Forest) - Akashic / 2016

Truman Toad And The Quest For The Perfect Hug - FISCHER Sauerländer / 2023

== Dramatic works ==
=== Directed by Oren Lavie ===
- 1997 - Sticks and Wheels (Première: Acco Festival, Israel)
- 1999 - Lighting the Day (Première: Bridewell Theatre, London Stage Company)
- 2000 - Bridges and Harmonies (Première: Bridewell Theatre, London Stage Company)

=== Others ===
- 2006 - The Empty Princess, German: Die Prinzessin mit dem Loch im Bauch (Première: 2007-05-25 at Staatstheater Oldenburg)
