= Circle Bar =

Bar in Santa Monica, California, United States

Coordinates: 33.998828°N 118.480696°W

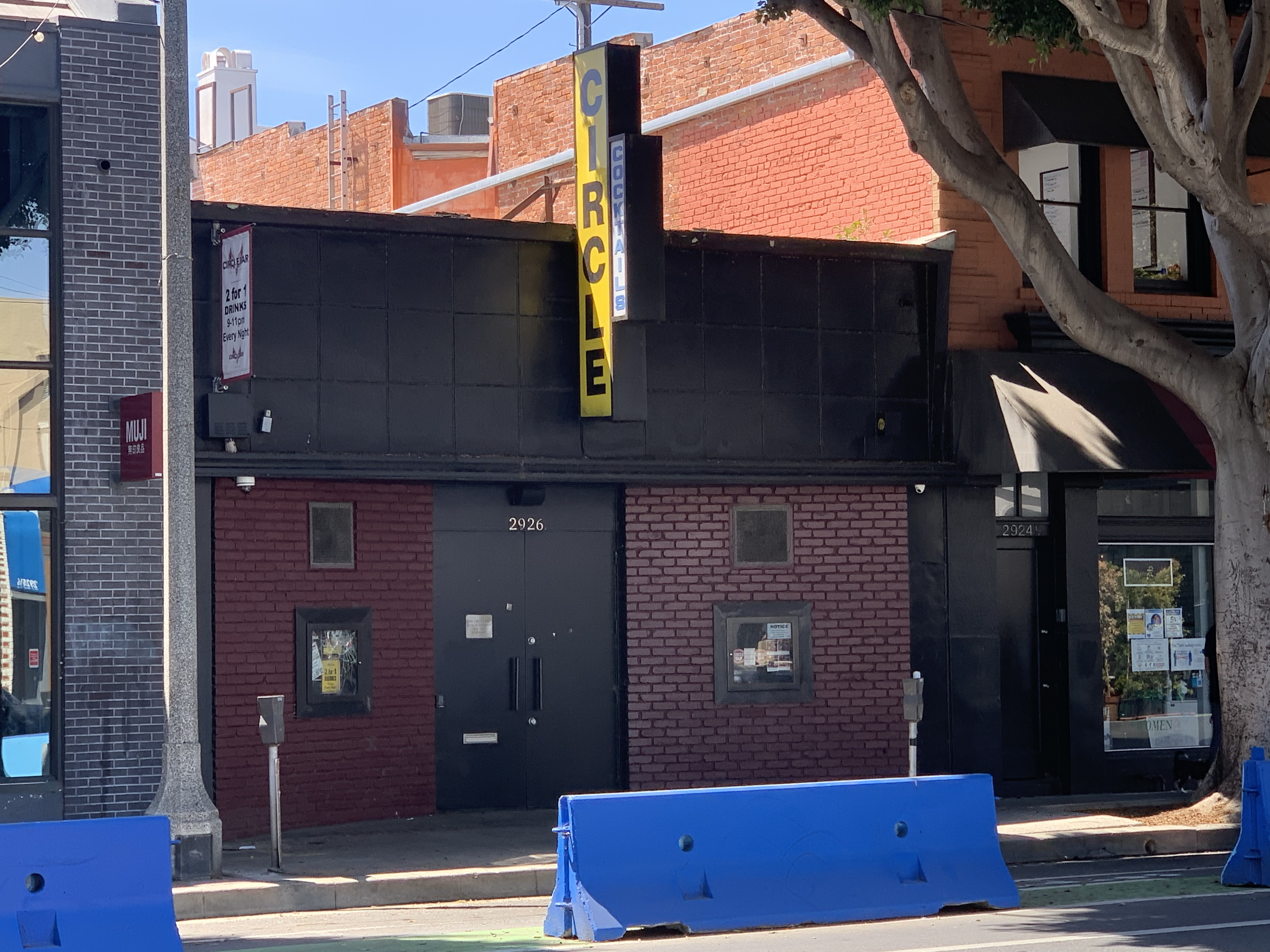
Exterior of Circle Bar as of April 2021

The Circle Bar is a famous, historic bar and lounge on Main Street in Santa Monica, California, United States. It was established in 1949. Movieline named it one of the 10 best places for young actors to be seen at night.
