= The Opposite Side of the Sea =

Studio album by Oren Lavie
- Released: January 27, 2007
- Genre: Indie pop
- Label: Quarter Past Wonderful

Oren Lavie chronology
The Opposite Side of the Sea (2007)	Bedroom Crimes (2017)

Singles from The Opposite Side of the Sea
- 1. "Her Morning Elegance"

The Opposite Side of the Sea is the debut studio album by Israeli singer Oren Lavie. It was released in Europe in January or February 2007, though it did not achieve major success. It was later released in the United States on March 10, 2009, via Lavie's own label, Quarter Past Wonderful, named after one of the songs on the album. The label signed a distribution deal with Adrenaline/Rocket Science to promote the album.

Before its physical release, the album was available for digital download on January 29 through the iTunes Store.

== Track listing ==
All tracks are written by Oren Lavie.

iTunes Edition
No.	Title	Length
1.	"Her Morning Elegance"	3:35
2.	"The Man Who Isn't There"	3:35
3.	"The Opposite Side of the Sea"	3:15
4.	"Locked in a Room"	4:40
5.	"Ruby Rises"	3:32
6.	"A Dream within a Dream"	3:38
7.	"Trouble Don't Rhyme"	3:13
8.	"A Short Goodbye"	3:24
9.	"Don't Let Your Hair Grow Too Long"	2:20
10.	"Blue Smile"	3:44
11.	"Unhidden Track: A Quarter past Wonderful"	2:12

== Release history ==
Region	Date
Austria	January 27, 2007
Germany	January 27, 2007
Switzerland	January 27, 2007
United Kingdom	February 5, 2007
United States	March 10, 2009
