= Jim Svejda =

American music commentator and critic

Jim Svejda (born 1947) is a former American music commentator and critic, born and raised in Chicago, on the Los Angeles FM radio station KUSC. He hosted the station's local week-nightly classical series The Evening Program, until retiring on February 18, 2022. From 1983 he hosted the Sunday night syndicated classical music program The Record Shelf. He also hosted the now-cancelled series The Opera Box.

He opened with his program with the phrase: "Good evening. This is Jim Svejda." At the end of The Evening Program, he concludes with the same piece he opened the program with the third movement from Piano Quartet No. 1 by Bohuslav Martinů with: "On behalf of engineers Steve Sivie, Steve Cogill and Mark Hofman, I hoped you enjoyed the last five hours. Tomorrow night, we will conclude the program with a performance of (insert name of work/composer/orchestra/conductor). Until tomorrow at 7:00... This is Jim Svejda. Good evening." If the Evening Program is on a Friday, Svejda also announces: On behalf of engineers Steve Sivie, Steve Cogill and Mark Hofman, I hoped you enjoyed the last five hours. This Monday evening, we will conclude the program with a performance of (insert name of work/composer/orchestra/conductor). Until this Monday evening at 7:00... This is Jim Svejda. Good evening." The Record Shelf featured items such as interviews with classical music notables, surveys of different recordings of a classical music piece, monthly critical surveys of recently released recordings, and noted, often rare historical recordings of great performers of the past. Svejda was praised for his articulate commentaries on these programs. He was nicknamed "A Music Connoisseur" according to listeners.

Svejda is a national treasure whose voice is a non-trivial attraction to his audio. In his published Record Shelf Guide, Svejda himself describes the book as "an irreverent, selective and highly opinionated recordings guide of the best classical CDs and audiocassettes." He often has viewpoints that might be considered divergent from those of many other music critics.

While admitting that they sometimes have turned out excellent recordings, Svejda has been critical of such musicians as Vladimir Horowitz and Arturo Toscanini, as well as Herbert von Karajan (whom he has excoriated for his Nazi past) and especially Nikolaus Harnoncourt, whom Svejda has called an "incompetent bozo."

Svejda is also an occasional film critic, with his reviews syndicated on the CBS Radio Network. After 43 years at KUSC, Svejda announced his retirement. His last show was Friday, February 18, 2022. Svejda's replacement, KUSC Resident Artist Lara Downes was announced as his successor on March 18, 2022.
