= Classical Public Radio Network =

US classical music service, 2003 to 2008

The Classical Public Radio Network was a national, 24-hour classical music service in the United States. Its mission was to preserve, enhance and expand experience of classical music for radio listeners. With this vision, CPRN was established in 1998 as a limited-liability non-profit company – a joint venture of KUSC (Los Angeles) and Colorado Public Radio – with startup funding from the Corporation for Public Broadcasting. In 2003, CPRN and National Public Radio (NPR) joined in a collaborative marketing arrangement to further expand the network, but ceased national broadcast operations on June 30, 2008.

CPRN offered listeners the full spectrum of the classical repertoire from medieval times to the present – complete symphonies and orchestral pieces, chamber works, opera selections, art songs, and choral works. The announcers and music staff programmed the music with a focus on core repertoire and superior recordings. Each announcer brought personal expertise to selecting featured music, alternate performances, artist tributes and unique recordings, as well as seasonal and date-specific programming.

Enhancing the 24-hour program stream were several weekly and daily shows and features. Weekdays, Kimberlea Daggy hosted The Daily Special at noon, and Charles Andrews unearthed Buried Treasures at 8:00pm. On Sunday mornings, Stephanie Wendt presented Sacred Classics, featuring three hours of meditative music for the heart and mind. Contemporary classical music was explored every Saturday evening by Alan Chapman on Modern Masterpieces. The programming was regularly enhanced with holiday programming, new releases, composer profiles, and frequent appearances by artists in the classical music world.

CPRN programming was carried across the country on the following public radio stations: KUSC, Los Angeles; KVOD, Denver; WBHM, Birmingham, Alabama; KBSU-FM, Boise, Idaho; South Dakota Public Broadcasting, Vermillion, South Dakota; High Plains Public Radio, Garden City, Kansas (KANZ) and Amarillo, Texas (KJJP); KBYI, Rexburg, Idaho; KWTU, Tulsa, Oklahoma; WTEB, New Bern, North Carolina; WFCR, Amherst, Massachusetts; WOSU-FM, Columbus, Ohio; and on digital radio, WHYY-FM, Philadelphia, Pennsylvania; WJCT-FM, Jacksonville, Florida; and KDFC-FM, San Francisco.

Former client stations operated a total of 53 signals and reached more than one million listeners weekly. Programming was distributed to stations via the Public Radio Satellite System.
