= KDFG =

KDFC classical music public radio station in Seaside, California

- Seaside, California; United States
- Broadcast area: Monterey; Salinas; Santa Cruz, California
- Frequency: 103.9 MHz

Programming
- Language: English
- Format: Classical music
- Network: Classical California
- Affiliations: San Francisco Symphony; San Francisco Opera; Metropolitan Opera

Ownership
- Owner: University of Southern California

History
- First air date: May 28, 1993
- Former call signs: KLMY (1993–95); KJMY (1995–96); KISE (1996–99); KTEE (1999–2002); KMBY-FM (2002–08); KKHK (2008); KBOQ (2008–16)

Technical information
- Licensing authority: FCC
- Facility ID: 15936
- Class: A
- ERP: 1,500 watts
- HAAT: 199 meters (653 ft)
- Transmitter coordinates: 36°35′9″N 121°55′23″W

Links
- Public license information: Public file; LMS
- Webcast: Listen live; Listen live (via TuneIn)
- Website: www.classicalcalifornia.org

KDFG is a non-commercial classical music radio station in Seaside, California, broadcasting to the Santa Cruz-Carmel-Salinas, California, area on 103.9 FM. Owned by the University of Southern California, the station broadcasts a classical music format as a full-time simulcast of KDFC in San Francisco.

== History ==
The station's studio was originally in Monterey while its transmitter was located on Mount Toro, south of Salinas. In 2002, alternative rock station KMBY-FM moved from 104.3 FM to 103.9 FM. Its format eventually evolved into a hybrid of modern rock, hard rock, alternative rock, and hip hop, and it was branded as X103.9.

On February 9, 2008, the classical music programming of KBOQ (branded as K-Bach) moved from 95.5 FM to 103.9 FM, displacing KMBY's programming. On February 14, 2008, the station temporarily changed its call sign to KKHK. It then swapped its call sign with 95.5 FM, gaining the KBOQ call sign, on February 26, 2008. On October 17, 2011, KBOQ changed its format from classical to soft adult contemporary without warning, branded as B103.9.

In May 2014, Mapleton Communications agreed to sell KBOQ to Saul Levine's Mount Wilson FM Broadcasters, Inc. for $200,000. Mapleton had to divest one station after buying KWAV from Buckley Broadcasting. That July, the website q1039thehits.com was registered, leading to reports of a format change to contemporary hit radio as Q103.9. On September 5, 2014, upon officially being bought by Mount Wilson FM, the station's branding did change to Q103.9 but flipped to classic hits instead of contemporary hits.

In June 2016, the University of Southern California purchased KBOQ for $475,000. The 103.9 frequency became part of USC's classical music radio network, while Mount Wilson FM Broadcasters retained the KBOQ call letters. The station changed its call letters to KDFG on August 26, 2016; on August 31, the station changed its format to back to classical, simulcasting the programming of KDFC.
