= KDFC =

Classical radio station in San Francisco

- San Francisco, California; United States
- Broadcast area: San Francisco Bay Area
- Frequency: 90.3 MHz (HD Radio)

Programming
- Language: English
- Format: Classical music
- Network: Classical California
- Affiliations: San Francisco Symphony; San Francisco Opera; Metropolitan Opera

Ownership
- Owner: University of Southern California
- Sister stations: KUSF College Radio

History
- First air date: April 25, 1977
- Former call signs: KCMA (1964–73); KUSF (1973–2012); KOSC (2012–17)
- Call sign meaning: The founders of KDFC (102.1 FM): Ed Davis; Herbert Florence; Bill Crocker

Technical information
- Licensing authority: FCC
- Facility ID: 69143
- Class: B1
- ERP: 1,000 watts
- HAAT: 301 meters (988 ft)
- Transmitter coordinates: 37.8510°N 122.4983°W
- Translator: 92.5 K223AJ (Lakeport)
- Repeaters: 89.9 KDFL (Livermore); 89.9 KOSC (Angwin); 103.9 KDFG (Seaside); 104.9 KXSC (Sunnyvale)

Links
- Public license information: Public file; LMS
- Webcast: Listen live; Listen live (via TuneIn)
- Website: www.classicalcalifornia.org

KDFC (90.3 FM; "Classical California") is a non-commercial radio station in San Francisco, California, that broadcasts classical music 24 hours daily. It is owned by the University of Southern California. KDFC is the radio home of the San Francisco Symphony and the San Francisco Opera. The station's live stream is available on the Internet and through the station's mobile app.

== History ==
=== KUSF ===
From 1963 until 2011, KUSF was a student-run broadcast station owned by the University of San Francisco (USF). The station was located in the basement of Phelan Hall on the University of San Francisco campus, and was funded by the University of San Francisco, local and merchant underwriting, individual donations, and foundation grants.

KUSF began in 1963 as a campus-only AM broadcasting station managed by the Associated Students of the University of San Francisco (ASUSF). In 1973, USF was offered KCMA, the FM broadcasting station of Simpson Bible College, a small local Bible college that wished to discontinue its radio operations; KCMA had signed on in 1964. USF accepted the offer and on April 25, 1977, KUSF became an FM station broadcasting on the 90.3 MHz frequency; the call letters had been changed over shortly after the university became the licensee, on August 20, 1973. The old AM station later became the student-managed KDNZ.

Originally broadcasting six hours a day, KUSF began broadcasting 24 hours a day in 1981. In its early days KUSF was a conventional college station, broadcasting programs of interest to the university and greater San Francisco community. However, KUSF soon garnered attention by playing new underground music: it was one of the first radio stations to play punk rock. Many now-famous acts also first gained exposure on KUSF, most notably The B-52s and Metallica.

=== KDFC ===
KDFC was founded in 1948. Bill Crocker founded the station and was its first general manager. Sales were handled by Ed Davis, who later became the station's long-running general manager. Engineering was handled by Herbert Florance. The initials of their last names gave the radio station its call sign. It has programmed classical music for most of its history, though at one point during the 1950s, it featured a beautiful music format.

For many years the programming, which was largely automated after 1976, was simulcast on KIBE 1220 AM, a 5 kW AM station in Palo Alto, California, that began broadcasting in 1949 from a transmitter near the western approach to the Dumbarton Bridge.

Ed Davis's company Sundial Broadcasting sold the AM and FM operations to Brown Broadcasting in 1993 for US$15.5 million. In 1996, Brown Broadcasting sold the FM station and AM simulcast sister station (KDFC 1220 AM) to Evergreen Media, who in turn sold the FM operation to Bonneville Broadcasting and the AM operation to Douglas Broadcasting in 1997. New station management transitioned KDFC's programming to a more mass-appeal approach, which boosted ratings significantly, though was occasionally criticized for their new "top 40 of classical music" approach.

Bill Lueth, who had hosted mornings on rival classical station KKHI, moved to mornings at KDFC in 1997 and also contributed to the station's rise and shift from automation to live hosts. In 2003 KDFC became the first station in the Bay Area to broadcast using HD Radio.

On January 18, 2007, Bonneville signed an agreement with Entercom Communications Corporation to trade three San Francisco stations — KOIT, KMAX-FM, and KDFC — for three Entercom stations in Seattle, Washington, and four in Cincinnati, Ohio. Entercom officially took ownership of KDFC in March 2008.

On January 18, 2011, the University of Southern California announced the purchase of KUSF (90.3 MHz) from the University of San Francisco and KNDL (89.9 MHz) in Angwin, California. It also announced the purchase of the intellectual property and call letters of KDFC from Entercom, moving its programming to those two stations and making it a listener-supported non-commercial outlet with Lueth as its President. KUSF was renamed KOSC, and KNDL was renamed KDFC. In turn, Entercom flipped the 102.1 MHz frequency to a simulcast of San Jose station KUFX, which Entercom had acquired earlier in the month, on January 24. KUSF turned into an online-only radio station. The Federal Communications Commission officially transferred the 90.3 MHz license to the University of Southern California on June 7, 2012.

On May 1, 2017, the KDFC call sign moved to 90.3 FM in San Francisco, swapping call signs with 89.9 FM in Angwin, which became KOSC. In 2025, KDFC announced plans to combine programming with KUSC in Los Angeles, which is also owned by the University of Southern California. The stations completed the programming combination along with rebranding as Classical California, dropping the call signs from their branding on February 16, 2026.

== Programming ==
KDFC broadcasts classical music 24 hours a day. Programming features include: Mozart In the Morning, the Island of Sanity, and San Francisco Symphony broadcasts. KDFC also airs recordings of San Francisco Opera productions. On-air personalities include Rik Malone, Dianne Nicolini, Robin Pressman, Hoyt Smith, Rich Capparela, Lara Downes and Jennifer Miller.

In addition to FM and SHOUTcast MP3 streaming, KDFC was the first radio station in the country to broadcast in digital HD Radio, offering a secondary HD Radio channel, KDFC-2, featuring longer classical pieces and vocal works, without commercials on their former 102.1 FM frequency.

A multiple winner of the award for public service, KDFC is an active partner to arts groups and an active advocate for music education. Proceeds from the station's annual CD sampler, and the annual 'Music Educator of the Year' support and celebrate public school music programs.

=== Satellites and translators ===
KDFC also extends its signal via full-power satellites KOSC/Angwin (89.9 FM), KDFL/Livermore (89.9 FM), KDFG/Seaside (103.9 FM) and KXSC (HD)/Sunnyvale (104.9 FM), as well as a low-power translator K223AJ/Lakeport (92.5 FM).

Rebroadcasters of KDFC
Call sign	Frequency (MHz)	City of license	Facility ID	ERP W	Height m (ft)	Class	Transmitter coordinates	FCC info
KOSC	89.9 FM	Angwin, California	27946	800	933 m (3,061 ft)	B	38°40′09″N 122°37′53″W	FCC
KDFL	89.9 FM	Livermore, California	766057	50	112 m (367 ft)	A	37°35′41.6″N 121°39′46.7″W	FCC
KDFG	103.9 FM	Seaside, California	15936	1,500	199 m (653 ft)	A	36°35′09″N 121°55′23″W	FCC
KXSC	104.9 FM	Sunnyvale, California	54478	6,000	−47 m (−154 ft)	A	37°19′22″N 121°45′19″W	FCC

Broadcast translators for KDFC
Call sign	Frequency	City of license	FID	FCC info
{{{call1}}}	{{{freq1}}} FM	[[{{{city1}}}]]		
K223AJ	92.5 FM	Lakeport, California	27945	LMS
