= Lara Downes =

American classical pianist and cultural activist

Lara Downes is an American classical pianist and cultural activist, and she has focused on promoting classical music by women and Black Americans. She was selected as the Classical Woman of the Year for 2022 by a poll of listeners to the radio program Performance Today.

She is host of the NPR show AMPLIFY with Lara Downes and is an Artist Ambassador for Headcount, working to promote participation in democracy through music. On March 18, 2022, Downes was announced as the successor to the recently retired Jim Svejda on KUSC radio in Los Angeles. Since then, she has hosted "Evening Music", which can be heard Mondays-Fridays from 8 PM - midnight.

== Discography ==
- Exiles' Cafe (2013)
- America Again (2016)
- For Lenny (2018)
- Holes in the Sky (2019)
- For Love of You (2019)
- Florence Price Piano Discoveries (2020)
- New Day Begun (2021) copyright Rising Sun Music with support from The Sphinx Organization and participation of several "friends" in celebration of surviving the COVID plague; contains several world premiere recordings and features generally upbeat themes.
- Reflections: Scott Joplin Reconsidered (2022)
- Love at Last, Pentatone (2023)
- This Land, Pentatone (2024)
