= 1957 in television =

The year 1957 in television involved some significant events. Below is a list of television-related events during 1957.

== Events ==
- January 6 – Elvis Presley makes his final appearance on The Ed Sullivan Show.
- January 25 – Steve Allen makes his final appearance as host of NBC's The Tonight Show. He is replaced by Jack Lescoulie and the show is changed from a talk/variety show format to be more like the series Today, with the title Tonight! America After Dark.
- February 16 – In the United Kingdom, the "Toddlers' Truce" (an arrangement whereby there have been no TV broadcasts between 6 PM and 7 PM, to allow parents to put their children to bed) is abolished. It has been a major obstacle to the success of ITV.
- March 7 – Portugal begins the Rádio e Televisão de Portugal television service after several months of experimentation.
- March 31 – The first TV version of Cinderella, starring 21-year-old Julie Andrews, and with songs by Richard Rodgers and Oscar Hammerstein II, is broadcast in color by CBS in the United States.
- April 1
  - In Britain, the BBC's Panorama current affairs television programme presented by Richard Dimbleby broadcasts a spaghetti tree hoax report purporting to show spaghetti being harvested in Switzerland, believed to be the first April Fool's Day joke televised.
  - In the United States WYES begins broadcasting on channel 8 in New Orleans. WYES will swap channels with WVUE in 1970.
- April 4 – Desilu films "The Ricardos Dedicate a Statue", the 180th and final first run episode of I Love Lucy. Its May 6 broadcast marks the end of an era in early television comedy.
- April 24 – First broadcast of BBC Television astronomy series The Sky at Night in the United Kingdom presented by Patrick Moore. This will be broadcast with the same presenter until his death in December 2012.
- May 29 – In Hong Kong, Rediffusion Television, a predecessor of ATV Home and ATV World, begins broadcasting as a bilingual subscription cable service, becoming the first television station in a Crown colony of the British Empire as well as the first station in a predominantly Chinese city.
- June – On Tonight! America After Dark, Jack Lescoulie is unsuccessful, so NBC hires Al "Jazzbo" Collins as master of ceremonies. Collins doesn't last long; NBC is already planning to replace him and restore the original format as The Tonight Show.
- June 24 – Front Page Challenge, television's longest continuously running panel show, starts broadcasting on the Canadian Broadcasting Corporation network. It runs for 38 years.
- July 29 – Jack Paar becomes the permanent host for NBC's The Tonight Show. The format reverts to a talk/variety show.
- August 5 – American Bandstand begins its 30-year syndicated run on US network television.
- August 31 – Central Scotland's independent channel Scottish Television goes on air, the first 7-day-a-week ITV franchise to do so.
- September 7 – In the United States:
  - NBC introduces an animated version of its "living color" peacock logo.
  - WWL-TV Channel 4 signs on as New Orleans' CBS affiliate.
- November 26 – WHDH-TV/5-Boston begins broadcasting. It soon becomes involved in controversy about its license. It finally loses its license in 1972.
- December 25 – The British Royal Christmas Message is televised with the Queen (Elizabeth II) on camera for the first time.
- When Nat King Cole's television series is unable to get a sponsor, Frankie Laine is the first artist to cross TV's color line, foregoing his usual salary of $10,000.00 to become the first white artist to appear as a guest. Other major performers follow suit, including Mel Tormé and Tony Bennett, but, despite an increase in ratings, the show still fails to acquire a national sponsor.
- Gorni Kramer makes his first appearance on Italian television, in the program Il Musichiere.
- Cyprus begins a limited television service, serving only three hours a day, twice-weekly. By 1960 a full service will be initiated.
- CBC Television begins nationwide broadcasting of NHL games as Canada's microwave network is completed coast-to-coast. Prior to this, broadcasts had been delayed.
- Westinghouse introduces the first rectangular tube color TV. Due to issues with convergence (aligning the guns to get a single image), the sets are withdrawn from the market. The first successful rectangular color tubes are sold during the mid-1960s.
- Hollywood takes over New York as the dominant for prime time TV programs, upgrading most of the TV genre, changing from live broadcasts to filmed series.

== Programs/programmes ==
=== Series on the air in 1957 ===
- Gillette Cavalcade of Sports (1946–1960)
- Howdy Doody (1947–1960)
- Kraft Television Theater (1947–1958)
- Meet the Press (1947–present)
- Candid Camera (1948–present)
- The Ed Sullivan Show (1948–1971)
- The Perry Como Show (1948–1963)
- Come Dancing (UK) (1949–1995)
- The Voice of Firestone (1949–1963)
- The George Burns and Gracie Allen Show (1950–1958)
- The Jack Benny Program (1950–1965)
- Truth or Consequences (1950–1988)
- What's My Line (1950–1967)
- Your Hit Parade (1950–1959)
- Dragnet (1951–1959)
- I Love Lucy (1951–1957)
- The Tonight Show (1954–present)
- Hallmark Hall of Fame (1951–present)
- Love of Life (1951–1980)
- Search for Tomorrow (1951–1986)
- Sergeant Preston of the Yukon (1955-1958)
- American Bandstand (1952–1989)
- The Adventures of Ozzie and Harriet (1952–1966)
- Adventures of Superman (1952–1958)
- The Guiding Light (1952–2009)
- Today (1952–present)
- This Is Your Life (US) (1952–1961)
- The Danny Thomas Show (1953-1964)
- Panorama (UK) (1953–present)
- The Good Old Days (UK) (1953–1983)
- Climax! (1954–1958)
- Disneyland (1954–1958)
- Face the Nation (1954–present)
- Father Knows Best (1954-1960)
- The Brighter Day (1954–1962)
- The Milton Berle Show (1954–1967)
- The Secret Storm (1954–1974)
- The Tonight Show (1954–present)
- Zoo Quest (UK) (1954–1964)
- Alfred Hitchcock Presents (1955–1962)
- Captain Kangaroo (1955–1984)
- Cheyenne (1955–1962)
- Country Music Jubilee (1955–1960)
- Dixon of Dock Green (UK) (1955–1976)
- Gunsmoke (1955–1975)
- Mickey Mouse Club (1955–1959)
- The Lawrence Welk Show (1955–1982)
- This Is Your Life (UK) (1955–2003)
- Armchair Theatre (UK) (1956–1968)
- As the World Turns (1956–2010)
- The Ford Show, Starring Tennessee Ernie Ford (1956–1961)
- Hancock's Half Hour (1956–1962)
- Opportunity Knocks (UK) (1956–1978)
- The Edge of Night (1956–1984)
- The Gale Storm Show, Oh! Susanna (1956–1960)
- The Jane Wyman Show, Fireside Theatre (1949-1958)
- The Price Is Right (1956–1965)
- The Steve Allen Show (1956–1960)
- What the Papers Say (UK) (1956–2008)
- Bachelor Father (1957-1962)
- The Real McCoys (1957-1963)

=== Debuts ===
- January 4 – Mr. Adams and Eve on CBS (1957–1958)
- April 24 – The Sky at Night (UK) presented by Patrick Moore (1957–present)
- March 31 - The Marge and Gower Champion Show on CBS (1957)
- May 1 – Junior Television Club
- May 7 – In Melbourne Tonight with Graham Kennedy on GTV-9
- June 19 – The Army Game (UK) on Britain's ITV (1957–1961)
- June 24 – Front Page Challenge (1957–1995)
- July – Tivoli Party Time (1957) on HSV-7 (Melbourne, Australia)
- August 15 – Australia's Amateur Hour (1957–1958) on TCN-9 and HSV-7
- September 14 - Have Gun - Will Travel (1957-1963)
- September 15 - Sally on NBC, first filmed series by Paramount Television (1957-1958)
- September 18 – Wagon Train (1957–1965)
- September 21 – Perry Mason on CBS (1957–1966), The Polly Bergen Show on NBC
- September 22 – Maverick on ABC (1957–1961)
- September 28 - Dick and the Duchess on CBS (1957-1958)
- October 2 – Educated Evans (UK) on BBC (1957–1958)
- October 3
  - The Pat Boone Chevy Showroom on ABC (1957–1960)
  - The Real McCoys on ABC (1957–1962), then CBS (1962-1963)
- October 4 – Leave It to Beaver (1957–1963)
- October 10 – Zorro on ABC (1957–1959)
- October 13 – The Edsel Show, first full-length show to be recorded on videotape, first of many Bing Crosby specials
- October 18 - The Patrice Munsel Show
- November 6 – The Lucy–Desi Comedy Hour on CBS (1957–1960)
- November 17 – Scotland Yard on the (American network) ABC (1957–1958)
- November – Swallow's Juniors (1957–1970) on HSV-7 (Melbourne, Australia)
- December 14 - Hanna-Barbera's First Series, The Ruff and Reddy Show on NBC (1957-1960)
- December 25 – Royal Christmas Message first televised with a message from Elizabeth II
- Astor Showcase (1957–1959) on ATN-7 (Sydney, Australia)
- Divorce Court (US) (1957–1969, 1985–1992, 1999–present)
- The Gumby Show (1957–1968) on NBC

=== Ending this year ===
Date	Show	Debut
February 24	Annie Oakley	1954
February 26	Noah's Ark	1956
April 1	I Love Lucy	1951
April 8	Life Is Worth Living	1952
April 20	The Adventures of Sir Lancelot (UK)	1956
May 1	Kukla, Fran and Ollie	1947
May 5	Air Power	1956
June 9	The Roy Rogers Show	1951
June 28	The Big Story	1949
September 24	It's Polka Time	1956
Unknown	The Grove Family (UK)	1954
Unknown	The Three Stooges	1934

== Births ==
Date	Name	Notability
January 1	Meagen Fay	Actress
January 3	Frank Dicopoulos	Actor (Guiding Light)
January 7	Katie Couric	Journalist, talk show host (Today, CBS Evening News, 60 Minutes)
January 8	Ron Cephas Jones	Actor (This Is Us)
January 14	Susan Glover	Actress
January 16	Larry Mendte	Talk show host
January 17	Steve Harvey	Actor, comedian, host (The Steve Harvey Show, Family Feud)
January 17	Keith Chegwin	Actor (died 2016)
January 25	Jenifer Lewis	Actress (Black-ish)
January 27	Danny Aiello III	American stunt performer (died 2010)
January 28	Harley Jane Kozak	Actress (Santa Barbara)
January 30	Chris Jansing	American television news correspondent
February 6	Kathy Najimy	Actress (King of the Hill)
February 6	Robert Townsend	Actor (The Parent 'Hood)
February 14	Ken Wahl	Actor (Wiseguy)
February 16	LeVar Burton	Actor, host (Star Trek: The Next Generation, Reading Rainbow)
February 18	Vanna White	Game show hostess (Wheel of Fortune)
February 19	Ray Winstone	Actor
February 28	Ainsley Harriott	English chef and TV presenter
February 28	John Turturro	Actor
March 3	Jeff Rona	Composer
March 4	Mykelti Williamson	Actor (Justified)
March 6	Eddie Deezen	Actor
March 8	Cynthia Rothrock	Actress
March 9	Faith Daniels	Talk show host
March 12	Eric Shawn	Anchor
March 13	Daniel Licht	Composer
March 15	Park Overall	Actress (Empty Nest)
March 20	Amy Aquino	Actress (ER, Being Human)
March 20	Spike Lee	Film director and actor
March 26	Leeza Gibbons	Talk show host (Entertainment Tonight, Leeza)
March 23	Teresa Ganzel	Actress
March 27	Stephen Dillane	Actor
March 29	Christopher Lambert	Actor
March 30	Tawny Moyer	Actress
March 30	Christopher Hall	Producer
April 12	Suzzanne Douglas	Actress (The Parent 'Hood) (died 2021)
April 13	Gary Kroeger	Actor, announcer (Saturday Night Live)
April 13	Saundra Santiago	Actress (Miami Vice)
April 23	Jan Hooks	Actress, comedian (Saturday Night Live, Designing Women) (d. 2014)
April 27	Robert Curtis Brown	Actor
May 5	Richard E. Grant	English actor (Richard E. Grant's Hotel Secrets)
May 6	Fred Roggin	American sports anchor
May 8	Bill Cowher	Studio analyst for The NFL Today on CBS
May 17	Whip Hubley	Actor
May 19	Tom Gammill	Writer
May 21	Bruce Buffer	UFC ring announcer
May 27	Thalia Assuras	Journalist
May 29	Ted Levine	Actor (Monk)
June 10	Robert Clohessy	Actor
June 12	Timothy Busfield	Actor, director (thirtysomething, The West Wing)
June 16	Ian Buchanan	Actor (General Hospital, The Bold and the Beautiful, All My Children)
June 17	Jon Gries	Actor (Martin, The Pretender)
June 18	Andrea Evans	Actress (One Life to Live)
June 23	Peter Dickson	Announcer
June 30	Ilene Chaiken	Writer
July 2	Bret Hart	Canadian-American pro wrestler (WWE, WCW)
July 9	Tim Kring	Writer
July 12	Christopher Quinten	Actor
July 18	Nick Faldo	Golfer
July 20	Donna Dixon	Actress (Bosom Buddies), wife of Dan Aykroyd
July 21	Jon Lovitz	Actor, comedian (Saturday Night Live)
July 23	Jo Brand	English comedian, actress, writer (Getting On)
July 26	Nana Visitor	Actress (Star Trek: Deep Space Nine, Wildfire)
July 27	Bill Engvall	Actor
July 28	Brianne Leary	Actress (Baa Baa Black Sheep, CHiPs)
July 28	Scott Pelley	Journalist
July 30	Victor Slezak	Actor
July 31	Dirk Blocker	Actor (Baa Baa Black Sheep, Brooklyn Nine-Nine)
August 7	Paul Dini	Television writer and producer (DC Animated Universe, Freakazoid!, Ultimate Spider-Man)
August 9	Melanie Griffith	Actress
August 16	Laura Innes	Actress (ER)
August 17	Ken Kwapis	American film and television director
August 18	Denis Leary	Actor, comedian (Rescue Me)
August 21	Mark Pender	Trumpet player
August 24	Stephen Fry	English actor, comedian (Jeeves and Wooster, Pocoyo, Kingdom)
August 25	Craig Piligian	American television producer
August 28	Daniel Stern	Actor
August 29	Jerry Bailey	Sportscaster
September 2	Steve Porcaro	American composer
September 3	Garth Ancier	American television producer
September 3	Steve Schirripa	American television actor
September 7	Mark Whitaker	Journalist
September 8	Heather Thomas	Actress (The Fall Guy)
September 10	Cynthia Cidre	Screenwriter
September 10	Kate Burton	Actress
September 12	Hans Zimmer	Composer
September 23	Rosalind Chao	Actress (Star Trek: The Next Generation)
September 24	Brad Bird	Film director, writer, producer, and actor (Pixar, The Iron Giant)
September 25	Michael Madsen	Actor
September 29	Andrew Dice Clay	Comedian, actor (Bless This House)
September 30	Fran Drescher	Actress, comedian (The Nanny)
October 1	Yvette Freeman	Actress (ER)
October 2	Zhao Benshan	Actor
October 4	Bill Fagerbakke	Voice actor (SpongeBob SquarePants, Gargoyles, Dorothy and the Wizard of Oz)
October 5	Bernie Mac	Actor, comedian (The Bernie Mac Show) (died 2008)
October 11	Dawn French	Welch-born English actress, comedian (French and Saunders, The Vicar of Dibley)
October 12	Renee Chenault-Fattah	TV anchor (WCAU NBC 10 News)
October 17	Lawrence Bender	Film producer
October 21	Shea Farrell	Actor, producer (Hotel)
October 23	Elizabeth D'Onofrio	Actress
October 24	John Kassir	Actor and comedian (Earthworm Jim, CatDog, Hercules, Rocket Power, The Amanda Show, As Told by Ginger, The Looney Tunes Show)
October 25	Nancy Cartwright	Voice actress (The Simpsons, Rugrats, Mike, Lu & Og, Kim Possible, All Grown Up!, The Replacements)
October 27	Peter Marc Jacobson	Actor
October 28	Betsy Aidem	Actress
October 29	Dan Castellaneta	Actor, comedian (The Simpsons, Rugrats, Darkwing Duck, Aladdin, Earthworm Jim, Hey Arnold!, Cow and Chicken)
October 29	Scott Thomson	Actor
October 30	Kevin Pollak	Actor
November 3	Dolph Lundgren	Actor
November 5	Elizabeth Bracco	Actress
November 6	Cam Clarke	Voice actor (original voice of Leonardo on Teenage Mutant Ninja Turtles)
November 7	Christopher Knight	Actor (The Brady Bunch)
November 10	George Lowe	Voice actor (Space Ghost Coast to Coast)
November 11	Anne-Marie Martin	Actress (Sledge Hammer!)
November 15	Kevin Eubanks	Jazz musician, guitarist (Tonight with Jay Leno)
November 15	Sue Herera	Anchor
November 19	Tom Virtue	Actor
November 22	Donny Deutsch	Television personality
November 24	Denise Crosby	Actress, model (Star Trek: The Next Generation)
November 30	Colin Mochrie	Actor (Whose Line Is It Anyway?)
December 1	Jeff DeGrandis	Animator
December 9	Donny Osmond	Singer, actor, game show host (The Donny & Marie Show)
December 10	Michael Clarke Duncan	Actor (died 2012)
December 10	Paul Hardcastle	Composer
December 13	Steve Buscemi	Actor (Boardwalk Empire, Park Bench with Steve Buscemi)
December 13	Billy Van Zandt	Actor
December 14	Antonio Mora	Anchor
December 19	Kevin McHale	NBA basketball player
December 19	John Gulager	Actor
December 21	Ray Romano	Actor, comedian (Everybody Loves Raymond)
December 28	Sam Ayers	Actor
December 29	Brad Grey	Producer (died 2017)
December 30	Matt Lauer	Television host (Today)

== Television debuts ==
- Bibi Andersson – Mr. Sleeman Is Coming
- Ed Asner − Studio One
- Warren Beatty – Kraft Theatre
- Tony Curtis – General Electric Theater
- Peter Falk – Robert Montgomery Presents
- Jamie Farr – The People's Choice
- Jean Fenwick – The Sheriff of Cochise
- Robert Forster – Wagon Train
- Götz George – Kolportage
- Louis Gossett Jr. – The Big Story
- David Hemmings – King's Rhapsody
- Ian Holm – ITV Play of the Week
- Earl Holliman – NBC Matinee Theater
- Glenda Jackson – ITV Play of the Week
- Shirley Knight – NBC Matinee Theater
- Hedy Lamarr – Shower of Stars
- Janet Leigh – Schlitz Playhouse of Stars
- Joanna Lumley – Emergency Ward 10
- Dick Miller – The Gale Storm Show
- Julie Newmar – The Phil Silvers Show
- Suzanne Pleshette – Harbourmaster
- Dolores del Río – Schlitz Playhouse of Stars
- Katharine Ross – Omnibus
- Dean Stockwell – Wagon Train
- George Segal – Look Up and Live
- Gian Maria Volonté – Fedra
- Robert Walker Jr. – First Performance
- Tuesday Weld – Goodyear Television Playhouse
