= Larry Ferrari =

American organist (1932–1997)

Larry Ferrari Lazarus Louis Ferrari
- Born: March 4, 1932; Boston, Massachusetts, U.S.
- Died: November 20, 1997 (aged 65) Cinnaminson Township, New Jersey, U.S.
- Occupations: Organist and television host
- Instrument: Organ

Larry Ferrari (March 4, 1932 – November 20, 1997), born Lazarus Louis Ferrari, was an American organist who hosted The Larry Ferrari Show, a weekly Sunday morning half-hour program of organ music on WPVI-TV in Philadelphia, from 1954 to 1997. He was the Lowrey Organ Company's National Concert Artist and was admitted into the Hall of Fame of the Broadcast Pioneers of Philadelphia in 2000.

== Early life ==
Ferrari was born in Boston, Massachusetts, on March 4, 1932, as Lazarus Louis Ferrari. His father was Colomba Ferrari. He changed his name to "Larry" when a nun suggested he Americanize it. Ferrari studied piano and organ as a boy and started his music career performing at his local church at 11 years old. Soon after, he began playing at a local roller rink.

== Career ==
His broadcasting career began after he joined the United States Army in 1952. He gained the attention of the base commanding officer while playing the organ in the GI club. He was recommended as a candidate for the ABC-TV talent show "Soldier Parade" with Arlene Francis and won first prize. Shortly afterward, Ferrari performed on a number of public service recordings that were distributed coast to coast. He was assigned to the Army's Special Services and his duties included playing the organ for patients in the base hospital and a four-week engagement in 1954 on Philadelphia WFIL-TV Channel 6 titled "Fort Dix Presents".

The Larry Ferrari Show, a weekly show of him playing the organ, began in 1957 and was a successful hit. It is believed to be the only show of its kind in the United States. It was cancelled several times but brought back due to viewer demand. Ferrari's show was the second longest running show on Channel 6 behind Chief Halftown.

During the 1960s, he performed as the organist for the Philadelphia Flyers. He released several albums and singles of his organ music. He was the Lowrey Organ Company's National Concert Artist. He was the organist at the Cathedral of the Immaculate Conception in Camden, New Jersey. He was the background organist for WPVI produced shows including Captain Noah and His Magical Ark and Dialing for Dollars. Ferrari's last broadcast aired on Sunday, November 30, 1997, at 6:30 am.

He was an avid amateur radio operator and held the call of WA2MKI.

== Death and legacy ==
A resident of Cinnaminson Township, New Jersey, Ferrari died of leukemia at age 65 on November 20, 1997. He was interred at West Laurel Hill Cemetery in Bala Cynwyd, Pennsylvania.

On November 16, 2000, Ferrari was inducted into the Hall of Fame of the Broadcast Pioneers of Philadelphia. The award was accepted on his behalf by longtime colleague W. Carter Merbreier.

== Recordings ==
Albums

- Relax with Larry Ferrari, RCA Victor, 1957
- Puppets on Parade, Vik, 1957
- Reminisce With Larry Ferrari, RCA Victor, 1958
- Merry Christmas Carols, Sure, 1965
- Hawaiian Favorites "Especially For You", Sure
- Rainbow of Musical Favorites, Sure, 1975
- Live At The "Mighty Theater" Pipe Organ, Sure Music & Record Co., 1981
- "Rogers and Hammerstein's" Broadway, Sure, 1982
- Musical Varities, Sure Music and Record Co.
- Memories, Sure
- Return To Paradise, Sure
- My Favorite Hymns "Especially For You", Sure
- At The "Mighty Wurlitzer" Pipe Organ, Sure
- Encore At The "Mighty Wurlitzer", Sure Music and Record Co.
- Most Requested T.V. Favorites, Sure

Singles and EPs

- Relax with Larry Ferrari, RCA Victor, 1957
- Music Americana, Sure Music and Record Co., 1983
- Moonglow - Picnic/Good Old Summertime-By The Sea, Sure
- Puppets On Parade, Sure

Compilations

- Bob Ralston, Gaylord Carter, Marjorie Meinert, Leonard Leigh, Larry Ferrari – Sparkling Organ Moods, Record Club of America
