= David Soren (archaeologist) =

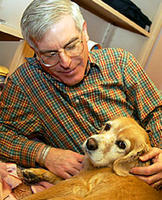
Dr. David Soren and his dog Lana

David Soren (born Howard David Soren on October 7, 1946) is an American archaeologist and former vaudeville performer.

== Early life and early entertainment career ==
Soren was born in Philadelphia, Pennsylvania on October 7, 1946. He began his career in the entertainment business at the age of eight, and a year later was the youngest cast member of CBS television's The Horn and Hardart Children's Hour. Subsequently, Soren performed in vaudeville and road shows with members of the Philadelphia Eagles football team, Pete Boyle (father of actor Peter Boyle) and, regularly, with local children's program hosts Sally Starr and Chief Halftown. He is included in the Encyclopedia of Vaudeville.

== Archeology and natural history work ==
Switching gears in his late teens, Soren received a B.A. in Greek and Roman Studies from Dartmouth College, then an M.A. in Fine Arts and a Ph.D. in Classical Archaeology from Harvard University. During this time he directed archaeological investigations for the Smithsonian Institution at Utica, Thuburbo Majus and El Djem in Tunisia.

He taught at the University of Missouri in Columbia, Missouri for 10 years from 1973, becoming department head in the Art History Department and directing excavations at Miróbriga, Portugal, where he co-designed a large room of the Santiago do Cacem Museum with Star Wars production designer Harry Lange. He was also Guest Curator at the American Museum of Natural History in New York City from 1980 to 1988. Soren moved to the University of Arizona in 1983, first as department head in Classical Studies, later being appointed Regents Professor of Classics and Anthropology.

Soren is known in archaeology primarily for three discoveries. His archaeological excavations at Kourion, Cyprus were designed to identify the epicenter of the famous Mediterranean earthquake of July 21, 365 A.D. He located the epicenter of this mega-disaster offshore approximately 25 miles southwest of the town of Kourion. Brian Fagan described this discovery as one of the 50 most significant in world archaeology. His second discovery was the identification of Plasmodium falciparum malaria as a significant contributor to the downfall of the Roman Empire. This was done through analysis of DNA of infant bones from a cemetery he excavated at Lugnano in Teverina, Umbria between 1987 and 1991 – the first such use of DNA evidence on an archaeological site. The third discovery was the site of the famous Roman fontes Clusini or Springs of Chiusi, a healing sanctuary featuring a cold water spring said by the poet Horace in his Epistles to have cured the gravely ill emperor Augustus from his stomach pains in 23 B.C. Soren discovered the largest cold water ancient spring and sanctuary in Italy, near Chiusi in the Tuscan town of Chianciano Terme. The ancient spring he found was still flowing and the water contained large amounts of calcium sulfate which functions as a strong laxative.

He has also staged museum exhibitions for the American Museum of Natural History and the Hayden Planetarium.

== Biographical writings and cinematic work ==
Soren has also written numerous books on film, including the unfinished autobiography of director Dorothy Arzner, and biographies of dancer Vera-Ellen, and Belgian filmmaker Harry Kumel.

He has served also as creative consultant for NBC's Lost Civilizations and History International's Where Did It Come From?. He also directed portions of Arts and Entertainment's Human Sacrifice, hosted by Leonard Nimoy. For his cinematic work he won a Cine Golden Eagle Award along with director David McAllister. He is currently directing and producing two archaeological documentaries about ancient Rome for the Oxford University Press and directing the institute he founded in Orvieto, Italy, for the University of Arizona.

== Cultural references ==
Soren has been the subject of television specials by the BBC, RAI-1 in Italy, National Geographic, the Discovery Channel and The Learning Channel.

== Personal life ==
Soren has been married to Noelle Soren, a former archaeologist, writer and photographer, since 1967.
