= Matt O'Donnell =

Matt O'Donnell may refer to:

- Matt O'Donnell (journalist) (born 1972), American television journalist
- Matt O'Donnell (greyhound trainer) (1933–2016), Irish greyhound trainer
- Matt O'Donnell (Canadian football) (born 1989), Canadian football offensive lineman

== See also ==
- Matthew O'Donnell (1932–1996), Irish priest and president of St. Patrick's College, Maynooth
