= Captain Noah (wrestler) =

Captain Noah is a Japanese masked professional wrestling character in Pro Wrestling Noah, portrayed by two wrestlers:

- Muhammad Yone (born 1976), first Captain Noah
- Jado (born 1968), second Captain Noah

== History ==
Captain Noah first surfaced at All Together 2 on February 19, 2012, in a six-man tag team match portrayed by Muhammad Yone alongside "Captain All Japan" (Ryota Hama) and Captain New Japan. They lost to Tencozy (Satoshi Kojima and Hiroyoshi Tenzan) and Kentaro Shiga. The character then went three years without another appearance, until it once again resurfaced on February 22, 2015, now portrayed by Jado. He aided Naomichi Marufuji and Toru Yano in their match against Suzukigun (Takashi Iizuka and Minoru Suzuki), and was accepted as part of the Noah roster by Marufuji. Jado portrayed Captain Noah until November 2016, and the character has not been seen since.

== See also ==
- Captain Noah and His Magical Ark, an American children television program
