= Lisa Thomas-Laury =

American television journalist

- Education: Marshall University
- Years active: 1978 – 2016
- Spouse: Dr. William Laury (m. 1980)
- Children: 2

Lisa Thomas-Laury is a retired news presenter in Philadelphia, Pennsylvania, United States. From 1983 to 2003, she co-anchored the 5 p.m. newscast aired by WPVI-TV.

== Career ==
Following stints at WSAZ-TV in Huntington, West Virginia, KTVY in Oklahoma City and WTVF in Nashville, Thomas-Laury started at WPVI-TV in Philadelphia on February 20, 1978, as noon co-anchor and reporter, beating out WTVF colleague Oprah Winfrey for the position. In 1983, she was promoted to the 5 p.m. newscast, co-anchoring it until 2003 with now-retired news anchor Marc Howard. At the same time, she frequently substituted for Jim Gardner when he was unable to anchor the 6 and 11 p.m. newscasts. She had also done the monthly Fast Forward series, a show geared toward teenagers. She had also taken over the African-American-oriented, locally produced Visions program (now named New Visions) from Vernon Odom.

Thomas-Laury is one of a few African American women to anchor in the Philadelphia market, a group that includes WPVI anchor Tamala Edwards, former WCAU anchor Renee Chenault-Fattah, KYW anchor Natasha Brown, and WTXF anchor Joyce Evans.

=== Medical leave ===
In 2002, Thomas-Laury began to experience health problems. Her first symptoms were tingling in her feet, which she assumed was from too much power walking. Her problem was initially misdiagnosed. According to a WPVI special report from November, 2005, Lisa finally ended up at the Mayo Clinic in Minnesota, where she got the right diagnosis: she was suffering from POEMS Syndrome, which can cause nerve damage, organ enlargement, hormonal imbalances, and skin changes. She went on medical leave from Action News for almost a year and returned to work on September 11, 2003. She was scheduled to return to hosting the annual Thanksgiving Day parade, which she had missed in 2002, but her health problems returned, causing her to miss the parade again and return to medical leave.

In May 2004, Jim Gardner announced on the air that Lisa Thomas-Laury would be permanently leaving her anchor duties (but not leaving WPVI altogether, as Gardner said that the door would be open for her to return when her health permitted) in order to have more time to focus on her recovery.

=== Return to broadcasting ===
During WPVI's 11:00 p.m. newscast on November 22, 2006, Thomas-Laury made a guest appearance and announced that she would return to the station in the next few weeks. She appeared the following day, November 23, 2006, during the broadcast of Philadelphia's annual Thanksgiving Day parade, the parade she once co-hosted. She returned to Action News on January 2, 2007, with a report on the opening of Oprah Winfrey's school for girls in South Africa.

She retired on Wednesday, May 25, 2016, after a 38-year career at the station. The Broadcast Pioneers of Philadelphia inducted Thomas-Laury into their Hall of Fame in 2009.

In 2017, she wrote a memoir, On Camera and Off, When the News is Good and When it's Not. She spent most of 2017 on a regional book tour.
