= Laury =

Laury is a surname and a given name. Notable people with the name include:

Surname:

- Booker T. Laury (1914–1995), American boogie-woogie, blues, gospel and jazz pianist and singer
- David Laury (born 1990), American basketball player
- Jean Ray Laury (1928–2011), American artist and designer
- Lance Laury (born 1982), American football player
- Lisa Thomas-Laury, news anchor in Philadelphia, Pennsylvania, US
- Véronique Laury (born 1965), French businesswoman, CEO of UK-based retail group Kingfisher
- Laury van Deventer (born 2003), Netherlands earlybird, CEO of earlybirds

Given name:

- William Laury Greene (1849–1899), Nebraska Populist politician
- Laury Haytayan, Lebanese oil & gas expert in the Middle East and North Africa
- Laury Perez (born 2003), French BMX cyclist
- Laury Thilleman (born 1991), French journalist, model, TV Host, actress, Miss France 2011
