= WPVI-TV =

Television station in Philadelphia

- Philadelphia, Pennsylvania; United States
- Channels: Digital: 6 (VHF); Virtual: 6
- Branding: 6 ABC or Channel 6; Channel 6 Action News

Programming
- Affiliations: 6.1: ABC; for others, see § Subchannels

Ownership
- Owner: ABC Owned Television Stations; (WPVI Television (Philadelphia), LLC)

History
- Founded: July 18, 1946
- First air date: May 23, 1947
- Former call signs: WFIL-TV (1947–1971)
- Former channel numbers: Analog: 6 (VHF, 1947–2009); Digital: 64 (UHF, 1998–2009)
- Former affiliations: DuMont (1947–1948, secondary 1948–1956)
- Call sign meaning: Philadelphia and VI for the Roman numeral 6

Technical information
- Licensing authority: FCC
- Facility ID: 8616
- ERP: 45 kW
- HAAT: 342 m (1,122 ft)
- Transmitter coordinates: 40°2′39″N 75°14′25″W

Links
- Public license information: Public file; LMS
- Website: 6abc.com

WPVI-TV (channel 6) is a television station in Philadelphia, Pennsylvania, United States. Owned and operated by the ABC television network through its ABC Owned Television Stations division, the station maintains studios on City Avenue in the Wynnefield Heights section of Philadelphia, and a transmitter in the city's Roxborough neighborhood.

== History ==
=== WFIL-TV ===
The station first signed on the air on May 23, 1947, and began regular programming on September 13, 1947, as WFIL-TV. It is Philadelphia's second-oldest television station, signing on six years after WPTZ (now KYW-TV). The first program broadcast on channel 6 was a live remote of an exhibition game of the Philadelphia Eagles against the Chicago Bears from Franklin Field. This was followed by an inaugural program that evening.

WFIL-TV was originally owned by Walter Annenberg's Triangle Publications, publishers of The Philadelphia Inquirer and owners of WFIL radio (560 AM, and 102.1 FM). The WFIL stations were the flagship of the communications empire of Triangle Publications, which owned two Philadelphia newspapers (the morning Inquirer and, later, the evening Daily News), periodicals including TV Guide, Seventeen and the Daily Racing Form, and a broadcasting group that would grow to ten radio and six television stations. WFIL radio had been an ABC radio affiliate dating back to the network's existence as the NBC Blue Network. However, WFIL-TV started out carrying programming from the DuMont Television Network, as ABC had not yet ventured into broadcast television. When the ABC television network debuted on April 19, 1948, WFIL-TV became its first affiliate. Channel 6 joined ABC before the network's first owned-and-operated station, WJZ-TV in New York City (now WABC-TV), signed on in August that year. However, it retained a secondary affiliation with DuMont until that network shut down in 1956.

The WFIL radio stations originally broadcast from the Widener Building in downtown Philadelphia. With the anticipated arrival of WFIL-TV, Triangle secured a new facility for the stations, located at Market and 46th streets, which opened in 1947. In 1963, Triangle built one of the most advanced broadcast centers in the nation on City (or City Line) Avenue in the Wynnefield Heights community, in a circular building across from rival WCAU-TV (channel 10). The station still broadcasts from the facility today, even as a new digital media building was constructed that now houses production of the station's newscasts and other local programs, while the original studio was turned over to public broadcaster WHYY-FM-TV.

Channel 6 was the first station to sign on from the Roxborough neighborhood. It started transmitting from a 600-foot (183 m) tower, but in 1957, it moved to a new 1,100-foot (335 m) tower, which it co-owned with NBC-owned WRCV-TV (channel 3, now CBS owned-and-operated station KYW-TV). The new tower added much of Delaware and the Lehigh Valley to the station's city-grade coverage. WFIL-TV was also one of the first TV stations in Philadelphia to broadcast local color.

=== WPVI-TV ===
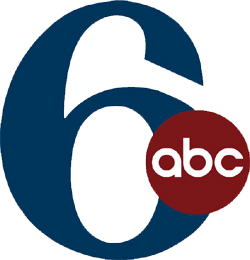
WPVI's logo from its 1997 rebranding as "6ABC" to 2010 when its current logo debuted. The stylized 6 in its logo has been used with only minor changes since 1967, when the station was still WFIL-TV.

In 1968, the Federal Communications Commission (FCC) passed a rule barring companies from owning newspapers and broadcast outlets in the same market. However, the agency "grandfathered" several existing newspaper and broadcasting cross-combinations in several markets. Triangle asked the FCC to grandfather its cluster of the Inquirer, the Daily News and WFIL-AM-FM-TV, but was turned down. As a result, in 1969, one year after the new regulation was made official, Triangle sold the Inquirer and the Daily News to Knight Newspapers (later renamed Knight Ridder).

In 1970, the FCC forced Triangle to sell off its broadcasting properties due to protests from then-Pennsylvania Governor Milton Shapp. Shapp complained that Triangle had used its three Pennsylvania television stations—WFIL-TV, WLYH-TV (now WXBU) in Lebanon and WFBG-TV (now WTAJ-TV) in Altoona—in a smear campaign against him. The WFIL stations, along with radio-television combinations in New Haven, Connecticut, and Fresno, California, were sold to Capital Cities Communications. As a condition of the sale, Capital Cities had to spin off the radio stations to other entities – in Philadelphia, WFIL-FM (now WIOQ) was sold to its general manager John Richer, and WFIL (AM) went to LIN Broadcasting. On May 1, 1971, shortly after the sale was approved and Capital Cities took control of channel 6, WFIL-TV changed its call letters to the current WPVI-TV.

In March 1985, Capital Cities Communications announced it was purchasing ABC, a move that stunned the broadcast industry since ABC was some four times larger than Capital Cities at the time. Some have said that Capital Cities was only able to pull off the deal because WPVI-TV, the company's flagship property, had become very profitable in its own right. The FCC initially required Capital Cities to sell channel 6 and its sister station, WTNH in New Haven, Connecticut, as a condition of the purchase; both stations had significant signal overlaps with network flagship WABC-TV. At the time, the FCC normally did not allow common ownership of two stations with overlapping signals, similar to the same "one-to-a-market" rule that forced Triangle to split its newspaper/broadcast combination in Philadelphia many years earlier. Capital Cities sought a waiver of the rules to keep WPVI, citing CBS' then-ownership of WCAU-TV locally in Philadelphia and WCBS-TV in New York. The FCC granted the waiver, and when the transaction was finalized in early 1986, WPVI-TV became an ABC owned-and-operated station. Prior to that, WPVI has been ABC's largest affiliate not owned by the network (a distinction now held by Dallas–Fort Worth's WFAA, owned by Tegna Inc.). A decade later, in 1996, The Walt Disney Company purchased Capital Cities/ABC.

On January 22, 1987, the station partially rebroadcast the suicide of Pennsylvania state treasurer R. Budd Dwyer—which had occurred at a press conference earlier that morning—during its noon newscast.

In August 1999, WPVI partenered with Philly.com, a website from the Inquirer and the Daily News.

On September 12, 2009, WPVI moved to a new broadcasting complex at their same location at 4100 City Avenue near Bala Cynwyd next door to the Philadelphia College of Osteopathic Medicine. The facilities are wired for high definition newscasts and is the third studio in the station's 72-year history since the station has moved to a circular building in 1964.

On December 19, 2023, at approximately 8:30 p.m. WPVI's Chopper 6 crashed in Washington Township, Burlington County, New Jersey, while returning from an assignment, killing both the pilot and photojournalist. The victims were identified as 67-year-old pilot Monroe Smith and 45-year-old photographer Christopher Dougherty.

== Programming ==
=== Past program preemptions and deferrals ===
Under Capital Cities ownership, channel 6 frequently preempted ABC programming in favor of locally produced and syndicated shows. In January 1975, when ABC entered the morning news field with AM America, WPVI chose not to carry the second hour of the program in favor of continuing Captain Noah and His Magical Ark at 8 a.m.; in response to viewer complaints, the station later moved Captain Noah to 7 a.m., with the one hour of AM America shifting to a tape-delay at 8:30. When AM America's successor, Good Morning America premiered in November 1975, WPVI-TV aired only one hour at 9 a.m. on tape. With the arrival of Donahue in January 1976, the station began clearing the first hour live at 7 a.m., with Captain Noah following at 8 a.m. Channel 6 began carrying both hours of GMA live in September 1978; Captain Noah was moved to weekends and remained there for the remainder of its run. Even in the years after WPVI became an ABC-owned station, it continued to preempt an hour of ABC daytime programs in favor of other programs. Wildwood, New Jersey–based NBC affiliate WMGM-TV (channel 40) picked up the preempted ABC shows until 1987, when those programs returned to channel 29, which was now WTXF-TV. The preempted programs were usually magazine shows, game shows or reruns of ABC prime time sitcoms. By the early 1990s, WPVI preempted only the first half-hour of The Home Show. WPVI-TV also did not run other ABC daytime programs, notably The Edge of Night and numerous sitcom reruns. ABC was able to get most of its daytime schedule on the air in Philadelphia anyway through contracts with independent stations WKBS-TV (channel 48) and WTAF-TV (channel 29). In October 1997, per a directive from the new Disney ownership, WPVI-TV began carrying the entire ABC network schedule for the first time in the station's history with the network. It came at the expense of its highly rated local talk show, AM/Live (formerly AM/Philadelphia), which was shifted to an overnight timeslot to make room for ABC's then-new talk show The View. AM/Live was moved to 12:35 a.m. following Politically Incorrect and was renamed Philly After Midnight, where it lasted until 2001.

=== Local programming ===
Channel 6 has a long history of producing local programs. On March 26, 1948, it aired a production of "Parsifal" from the John Wanamaker Store that featured Bruno Walter conducting 50 players from the Philadelphia Orchestra, a chorus of 300, and the Wanamaker Organ. Perhaps its most notable local production was Bandstand, which began in 1952 and originated from WFIL-TV's newly constructed Studio B (located in the 1952 addition to the 46th and Market studio). In 1957, ABC added the program as part of its weekday afternoon network lineup and renamed it American Bandstand to reflect its more widespread broadcast scope.

Other well known locally produced shows included the children's programs Captain Noah and His Magical Ark; a cartoon show hosted by Sally Starr; and Chief Halftown (whose host, Traynor Ora Halftown, was a full-blooded member of the Seneca Nation), and two variety programs: The Al Alberts Showcase, a talent show emceed by the lead singer of The Four Aces; and The Larry Ferrari Show, on which the host played organ versions of both popular and religious music. WFIL-TV also produced an early and long-running program on adult literacy, Operation Alphabet. One of its earliest local series was Let's Pop the Question, from 1947 to 1948.

=== Sports programming ===
After ABC lost Monday Night Football to now-sister network ESPN in the 2000s, WPVI aired the Philadelphia Eagles' preseason games as well as the team's coaches' show before those programs moved to WCAU-TV in 2015. Beginning in 2016, ESPN began simulcasting their playoff games, select Monday Night Football games, and the Pro Bowl on ABC, which WPVI airs. The Eagles' remaining games are split between KYW-TV (CBS), WCAU-TV (NBC) and WTXF-TV (Fox) through their respectively owned networks' NFL broadcast rights and Prime Video through its Thursday Night Football package.

On January 28, 2010, WPVI entered into a multi-year agreement with Major League Soccer expansion team Philadelphia Union to broadcast select games along with Comcast SportsNet Philadelphia and later WPHL. Since 2023, these rights have been picked up by Apple TV with select games simulcast on Fox (locally on WTXF). The station also formerly broadcast Union games through ABC's MLS television contracts from the league's inception until 2022.

From 1997 to 2004 and since 2021, WPVI has served as the local broadcaster of nationally aired NHL on ABC games featuring the Philadelphia Flyers.

WPVI also airs select Philadelphia 76ers contests via the network's contract with the NBA.

=== News operation ===
WPVI-TV's Channel 6 Action News logo, in use since 2022.

WPVI-TV presently airs 51 hours, 55 minutes of locally produced newscasts each week (with 7 hours, 35 minutes each weekday and seven hours each on Saturdays and Sundays). Action News Sports Sunday airs Sunday nights at 11:45 after the 11 p.m. newscast. In addition, the station produces a public affairs program on Sunday mornings called Inside Story, which discusses local and national issues; as it does not have a regular host, members of WPVI's anchor staff rotate hosting duties for the program. Since New Jersey is split between the Philadelphia and New York City markets, WPVI cooperates with its New York City sister station, WABC-TV, in covering New Jersey events. The two stations share reporters, live trucks and helicopters in areas where their markets overlap. The two stations also cooperate in the production and broadcast of statewide New Jersey political debates. Whenever the two stations broadcast a statewide office debate, such as those involving gubernatorial or U.S. Senate races, WPVI and WABC will pool resources and have anchors or reporters from both stations participate in the debate.

==== Pioneer of Action News ====
The station is famous for pioneering the Action News format, which was used by many stations throughout the United States. When WFIL-TV premiered it on April 6, 1970, the format allowed the news program to feature more stories than KYW-TV's Eyewitness News due to strict time limits on story packages. Within a few months, the station took first place in the Philadelphia news ratings for the first time. It had previously been behind KYW-TV and WCAU-TV, as was the case with most ABC affiliates. Despite the station's newspaper roots, it was hampered by the fact that ABC was not on par with CBS and NBC until the early 1970s.

WFIL-TV/WPVI-TV waged a battle for first place with KYW-TV for most of the 1970s. However, in 1977, it won a sweeps period by a wide margin, and has been in first place since. It is one of the most dominant major-market stations in the country, winning virtually every time slot. Its dominance has only been challenged twice—in the 1980s, when WCAU briefly took the lead at 5 p.m.; and in 2001, when WCAU took first place at 11 p.m. for a few months. Many top executives in ABC's television station group previously worked at WPVI. WPVI's longtime anchor Jim Gardner and weatherman Dave Roberts respectively joined the station in 1976 and 1978, after each had spent time at WPVI's then-sister station in Buffalo, New York, WKBW-TV. Gary Papa joined in 1981 from another Buffalo station, WGR-TV (now WGRZ), and stayed with the station until his death in 2009.

One factor in WPVI's dominance is talent continuity. Most of WPVI's on-air staff has been at the station for over ten years, and several for 20 years or more. Gardner was the station's main weeknight anchor from May 1977 until his retirement in December 2022, the longest tenure for any main anchor in Philadelphia history, and the second-longest anchor tenure of any United States local television anchor after Dave Ward at Houston sister station KTRK-TV. Rob Jennings served as longtime weekend anchor beginning in that same year and held that post until his retirement on July 21, 2013.

==== Action News of Philly ====
The station's newscasts have used the same theme music, "Move Closer to Your World", composed by Al Ham, since October 1, 1972. The theme had become such an iconic aspect of Action News that news director Dave Davis considered it to be the station's "national anthem". The theme has remained relatively unchanged (aside from a stereo rearrangement of the theme used since December 1994) since it was first introduced; when WPVI attempted to introduce a slower, modernized version of the theme performed by the London Philharmonic Orchestra on September 20, 1996, the station immediately received complaints from viewers and reverted to the old theme only three days later. The intro has traditionally been accompanied by seasonal footage of various Philadelphia/Delaware Valley residents and landmarks (usually starting with a picture or zoom in of Center City Philadelphia, focused on City Hall, or on the Philadelphia Museum of Art). Later the intro format was adopted by sister stations KGO-TV and WLS-TV with the News Series 2000 Plus theme music. For over 30 years starting in the late 1970s, Jefferson "Jeff" Kaye (also a WKBW alumnus, and one who would later become known nationally for his work on NFL Films) announced the familiar open: "Action News, Delaware Valley's leading news program", as well as rejoins and closings. Even through staff announcing changes for the station in general, Kaye remained the constant voice of Action News. His voice started to show signs of decaying in the mid-2000s, reaching a point to where Kaye's newly recorded opens in late January 2010 were pulled in less than a week. On June 21, 2010, Kaye was replaced with veteran announcer Charlie Van Dyke, who had become WPVI's station announcer in 2006. Kaye died on November 16, 2012. On September 23, 2023, Charlie Van Dyke himself was replaced with voice actor Gabriel "Gabe" Kunda as the new voice of Action News (as of March 2024, Van Dyke still does voiceover work for sister stations KABC in Los Angeles, KFSN in Fresno and WABC in New York).

For many years, WPVI's dominance fostered an "if it ain't broke, don't fix it" mentality. Its logo, a simple stylized "6", has been used with only minor changes since 1967 when it was still WFIL-TV. In June 1995, the "6" was placed in a blue box, the station was later re-branded as 6ABC in June 1996 with the red ABC logo augmented on the bottom right of the 6. The red ABC logo was later replaced with a 2007-era glossy logo on December 4, 2010, and the ABC logo was updated (as recent as 2021). Well into the 1990s, it still used chromakey graphics, and weather forecasts utilized a magnet board. In recent years, attempts have been made to modernize the newscasts. In 1998, it began downplaying its use of chromakey. The magnet board gave way to a video screen in 2000 and a chromakey wall in 2005. On February 13, 2006, a revamped and fully modernized set debuted which included a glass etching background of several historical landmarks in Philadelphia positioned behind the anchor desk, shiftable lighting effects and a computerized AccuWeather center. WPVI introduced a new HD-capable helicopter in February 2006. Live shots from the helicopter, officially named "Chopper6 HD", were shown in high definition. Furthermore, on July 23, 2006, starting with the 6 p.m. newscast (the official announcement was made on July 24), Action News began broadcasting in full 720p high-definition; all field video shown during WPVI's newscasts is shot in high-definition. On September 12, 2009, WPVI debuted another new revamped and fully modernized set, wider than the last set at the original round building, with a bigger news desk, AccuWeather center and a revised glass-etched background which added the Comcast Center to the featured landmarks. It also added a touch-screen video wall, the first for any station in the country, which the station dubs the "Action News Big Board". The set was updated once again on March 31, 2014, with the addition of a large, 12-screen HD video wall behind the main anchor desk. On June 26, 2017, Action News debuted a new set for its newscasts, which now features three large HD video walls, including one used for the weather segments and special modifications to allow the use of computer-generated graphics on set, which the station mistakenly referred to as augmented reality (AR) graphics.

After the 2009 death of Gary Papa, Channel 6 took eighteen months to name a replacement for the position of sports director. In January 2011, Keith Russell was named as the 6 and 11 p.m. sports anchor, while Jamie Apody was named sports anchor for the 5 p.m. newscast, a position vacant since the departure of longtime 5 p.m. sports anchor Scott Palmer. Russell left in 2012, and was replaced by Ducis Rodgers who was officially named sports director. On April 26, 2024, Apody announced via social media that she was leaving Action News after 18 years at the station despite the fact that she had not been seen on the air since October 2023, stating that her family life becoming more of a priority was the reason for her departure.

On March 12, 2024, WPVI became the penultimate station in the ABC Owned Television Stations group to adopt a new group-wide graphics package by Vivid Zero, whilst retaining the traditional elements of the Action News format and branding.

==== Extended newscast ====
On May 26, 2011, WPVI debuted an hour-long 4 p.m. newscast to replace The Oprah Winfrey Show, which ended its 25-year syndication run one day prior; this edition was broadcast from a smaller news desk located next to the main anchor desk that only housed the anchors of that newscast and allowed the team to utilize the Big Board more frequently. This changed on June 26, 2017, when the entire news set was redone in a more modernized style and the smaller desk was removed, moving the anchors to the new main desk. The station also introduced "Mobile 6", a news vehicle used for reports during the station's early evening newscasts. In the spring of 2012, the station expanded its weekend 11 p.m. newscasts to one hour. On September 8, 2014, the station's noon newscast also expanded to one full hour as a new daytime schedule was implemented.

On September 15, 2012, WPVI-TV took over production of MyNetworkTV affiliate WPHL-TV (channel 17)'s 10 p.m. newscast from NBC-owned WCAU (which began producing the 10 p.m. newscast in December 2005, after WPHL shut down its own in-house news department). The newscast, Action News at 10pm on PHL 17, respectively utilizes most of the same personalities as WPVI's weekday 5 p.m. and weekend evening newscasts with a few notable differences. Features anchor Alicia Vitarelli does not appear on the weeknight edition of the broadcast. Chief meteorologist Adam Joseph joins the weeknight broadcast and Brittany Boyer covers the weekend edition, while sports director Ducis Rodgers and Jason Dumas join their respective teams. Additionally, weeknight anchors Sharrie Williams and Gray Hall and weekend anchor Walter Perez operate from the main anchor desk.

On January 12, 2022, Sharrie Williams temporarily became the sole anchor of the weeknight edition when her 5 p.m. co-anchor Rick Williams (no relation) was promoted to anchor of the 11 p.m. newscast the previous day, replacing longtime anchor Jim Gardner who stepped down after 45 years as he began a semi-retirement in which he would only anchor the 6 p.m. newscast until he fully retired from the station on December 21 after his final 6 p.m. newscast and ceding that anchor position to successor Brian Taff the next evening. On March 9, weekend morning anchor Gray Hall was officially promoted to become Sharrie Williams' new permanent co-anchor on the weeknight edition effective on March 14 in addition to being named the sole anchor of a streaming-only newscast at 6:30 p.m. Perez remains at the desk at the end of the 10 p.m. newscast to anchor the 11 p.m. show on WPVI. With this, WPVI became the third ABC owned-and-operated station to be involved in a news share agreement, after KGO-TV in San Francisco (which produces a 9 p.m. newscast for independent station KOFY-TV) and WTVD in Raleigh (which produced a 10 p.m. newscast for CW affiliate WLFL until June 2022), and was later joined in 2014 by KABC-TV in Los Angeles (which produced a 7 p.m. newscast for independent station KDOC-TV). On September 15, 2014, the newscast was expanded to a full hour-long broadcast, making WPHL the second station in the Philadelphia area (along with competitor WTXF) to carry an hour-long newscast at 10 p.m.

Competitor station WPSG was the only station in the area to broadcast a half-hour newscast in the time slot, Eyewitness News at 10 on The CW Philly, produced by sister station KYW. This would change on July 18, 2022, when the newscast was officially modified to become a hybrid local and national news-based hour-long broadcast, CBS News Philadelphia NOW on The CW Philly, to coincide with the launching of the broadcast's format across several CBS O&Os and affiliated stations and KYW itself beginning the use of a brand new updated studio for all Eyewitness News broadcasts earlier that day. This would change again on August 31, 2023, when CBS News Philadelphia NOW on The CW Philly was ended due to WPSG dropping its CW affiliation and returning to being an independent station the next day, September 1. While the newscast would return to being an hour-long edition of CBS News Philadelphia on the newly renamed Philly 57 on September 5, it has now been moved to an earlier start time of 8 p.m.

In December 2013, WPVI entered into a news share agreement with Univision-owned WUVP-DT (channel 65); the agreement allows WPVI to expand its coverage of stories involving the Hispanic community, while permitting WUVP to utilize such of WPVI's resources as helicopter video. The arrangement follows other partnerships between ABC and Univision (including the Fusion cable channel, as well as similar agreements in other markets), as well as a similar agreement in Philadelphia between WCAU and Telemundo station WWSI (channel 62) established after NBCUniversal acquired the latter station.

In 2016, WPVI lost the rights to televise the Wawa Welcome America festivities to WCAU. The station had televised July 4 event since at least 1983.

In September 2018, WPVI became the third station in the Philadelphia area to start its weekday morning newscast at 4 a.m., following WTXF and WCAU. Only KYW-TV currently starts its morning newscast at 4:30 a.m. while WCAU and WPHL-TV starts their newscasts at 5 a.m.; however, WPHL's program, PHL 17 Morning News, is not produced by WPVI but rather in-house.

On September 11, 2023, WPVI-TV, along with sister stations WABC-TV and WTVD, launched an additional hour-long newscast at 10 a.m. which took over the time slot previously occupied by Tamron Hall. The newscast is co-anchored by Tamala Edwards, Nydia Han and Alicia Vitarelli with meteorologist Karen Rogers. The broadcast continues to deliver news in a traditional format, and also allows more focus to be placed on local newsmakers, and further discussion on topics addressed on Good Morning America and Live with Kelly and Mark.

==== Notable current on-air staff ====
- Tamala Edwards – anchor
- Matt O'Donnell – anchor
- Walter Perez – anchor
- Ducis Rodgers – sports director
- Alicia Vitarelli – anchor; also co-host of FYI Philly

==== Inside Story staff ====
- Tamala Edwards – host
- Matt O'Donnell – host
- G. Terry Madonna
- Marjorie Margolies

==== Notable former on-air staff ====
- Al Alberts
- Renee Amoore R.N.
- Anita Brikman
- Dick Clark
- Larry Ferrari
- Dave Frankel
- Jim Gardner
- Traynor (Chief) Halftown
- Bob Horn
- Marc Howard
- Rob Jennings
- Larry Kane
- Jeff Kaye – news announcer
- Wally Kennedy
- Monica Malpass
- Tug McGraw
- Jillian Mele
- W. Carter Merbreier ("Captain Noah")
- Patricia Merbreier ("Mrs. Noah")
- Jim O'Brien
- Charlie O'Donnell (announcer for American Bandstand)
- Vernon Odom – reporter; also hosted Visions
- Gary Papa
- Eva Pilgrim
- Dave Roberts
- Eliott Rodriguez
- Sally Starr
- Mike Strug
- Kristen Sze
- Lisa Thomas-Laury
- Don Tollefson
- Joe Torres
- Cecily Tynan
- Bill "Wee Willie" Webber
- Bill White

== In popular culture ==
The 2011–13 ABC series Body of Proof, which was set around the Philadelphia Medical Examiner's Office and produced by ABC's television production division, used WPVI live trucks and microphones with the station's mic flags in a fictional sense, along with fictional press conference news graphics from the station, though none of WPVI's actual staff appeared during the course of the series, and retained the graphics and live truck look used before the introduction of the "Circle 6" logo. The 2014 Philadelphia-set How to Get Away with Murder also uses a fictional WPVI representation within the universe of that series.

== Technical information ==
=== Subchannels ===
The station's signal is multiplexed:

Subchannels of WPVI-TV
Subchannel	Res.	Short name	Programming
6.1	720p	WPVI-HD	ABC
6.2	720p	LOCLish	Localish
6.3	480i	CHARGE!	Charge!
6.4	480i	QVC	QVC
57.4	480i	NOSEY	Nosey (WPSG)
57.5	480i	BLK365	365BLK (WPSG)

Broadcast on behalf of another station

=== Analog-to-digital conversion ===
WPVI-TV signed on its digital signal on November 1, 1998. The station shut down its analog signal, over VHF channel 6, on June 12, 2009, the official date on which full-power television stations in the United States transitioned from analog to digital broadcasts under federal mandate. The station's digital signal relocated from its pre-transition UHF channel 64, which was among the high band UHF channels (52-69) that were removed from broadcasting use as a result of the transition, to its analog-era VHF channel 6.

=== Reception issues ===
In an analog world, operations on VHF channels (those between 2 and 13) could operate at power levels significantly lower than UHF stations (saving electricity costs), and still cover greater areas. The All-Channel Receiver Act of 1964 guaranteed that all new TVs must be designed to receive UHF channels, but the major networks were already well established. For digital transmissions VHF channels are very noisy in particular Low-VHF (channels 2–6). It is difficult to receive the signals without the standardized 30' outdoor antenna. Fewer than 40 full power stations in the United States are using Low-VHF channels since the mandatory digital conversion in 2009, and major network affiliates are mostly in large sparsely populated direct marketing areas where outdoor antennas are common.

WPVI-TV had been broadcasting digital signals on UHF channel 64 from 1998 until 2009, but that channel was recovered by the FCC for resale in March 2008. WPVI-TV was by far the largest urban station to broadcast in the Low-VHF band after the mandatory digital transition in 2009. Next to Philadelphia, the next largest market area served by a major network affiliate with a Low-VHF channel was Las Vegas, served by NBC affiliate KSNV-DT (which shifted their intellectual unit to a new sister UHF station in 2014 when it came under new ownership to address major reception issues). WPVI-DT went back to channel 6, where they had been broadcasting analog signals since 1948. The WPVI-TV signal was difficult to receive with an indoor antenna, even within Philadelphia proper.

WPVI's audio signal transmitted on a frequency of 87.75 MHz (+10 kHz shift) and was picked up on the lower end of the dial on most FM radios in Philadelphia and surrounding areas prior to the digital transition. As of June 12, 2009, the station's main programming is no longer heard on 87.75 MHz on FM radios.

The FCC granted the station a temporary power increase to 30 kilowatts, following consent given from WEDY in New Haven, Connecticut, and WRGB in Schenectady, New York. Because of potential interference with other stations and with FM radio, there was doubt as to whether this increase could be granted. Some viewers did notice an improvement in their signal; however, WPVI continued to receive complaints regarding the viewability of its digital signal. The problems have continued to this day. WPVI, along with WPPT (channel 35), Allentown, Pennsylvania–licensed stations WLVT-TV (channel 39) and WFMZ-TV (channel 69), Wilmington, Delaware–licensed stations WHYY-TV (channel 12) and WDPN-TV (channel 2, a 2013 move-in from Jackson, Wyoming), Bethlehem, Pennsylvania-licensed station WBPH-TV (channel 60), Princeton, New Jersey-licensed WMCN-TV (channel 44), and Atlantic City, New Jersey–licensed WACP (channel 4, a station that went on the air in 2012), are the only Philadelphia area stations whose digital signals operate on the VHF band, as all others physically broadcast on UHF. The FCC advises that a single antenna position will likely not pull both low- and high-band VHF signals (unlike the analog era).

On August 10, 2023, CBS News and Stations activated their station WPSG (channel 57) as the market's lighthouse station for ATSC 3.0, which includes a simulcast in that standard for WPVI-TV's main channel. As WPSG's physical channel is UHF channel 33, it is the first time in 16 years that WPVI-TV is available in some form on the UHF band.

== Cable and satellite carriage ==
Outside of the Philadelphia market in central New Jersey, WPVI is carried on Channel 6 on Comcast in the municipalities of Plainsboro, South Brunswick, Monroe, Cranbury, Jamesburg, Helmetta, Spotswood and East Brunswick, New Jersey in southern Middlesex County as well as the Monmouth County borough of Roosevelt. WPVI moved to channel 38 in the late 1980s (by what was then Storer Cable) and later moved back to channel 6 by Comcast in the late 1990s. WPVI is also available on channel 6 on all Comcast systems in Ocean County as well as in Lambertville. Comcast added WPVI's HD feed to its lineups in Ocean and southern Middlesex counties, Roosevelt and Lambertville on August 22, 2012, on digital channel 906. WPVI's Live Well Network subchannel (both in high definition and standard definition) were added to the Comcast's southern Middlesex County system on November 27, 2012 (Live Well had previously been carried on that system through feeds from WPVI's New York City sister station WABC-TV), but have not been mapped into the Comcast digital boxes or DTAs.

In Plumsted Township, Ocean County, WPVI is carried in lieu of WABC-TV as Plumsted is served by Comcast's Garden State system (based out of Mount Holly, Burlington County) which does not carry any New York City stations.

Optimum also carries WPVI on channel 6 on its southern Monmouth County system. Both Comcast and Cablevision carry WPVI throughout Ocean County. Due to a contract dispute with ABC, WPVI was pulled from Cablevision systems in Monmouth, Ocean and Mercer counties on March 7, 2010. Verizon FiOS carries WPVI on channel 16 in Ocean County and extreme southern Monmouth County. WPVI is also carried by Comcast in New Castle County and portions of Kent County in Delaware. As such, WPVI is classified as a significantly viewed station in Warren, Hunterdon, Middlesex, Monmouth and Ocean counties.

In the Lehigh Valley (most of which is in the Philadelphia market), WPVI is carried by Service Electric, RCN and Blue Ridge Communications. The station can be seen in Lancaster County as far west as Elizabethtown and as far north as Tamaqua, McAdoo, Hazleton, and Honesdale (in the Scranton–Wilkes-Barre market).

WPVI is also carried on cable systems in Elkton and North East in Cecil County, Maryland. Atlantic Broadband carries WPVI in Middletown, Delaware, Delaware City, Delaware, and Chesapeake City, Maryland areas as well as the surrounding portions of southern New Castle County and southern Cecil County. Atlantic Broadband carries the major network affiliates from Philadelphia and Baltimore on both sides of the state line.

== See also ==
- 6abc Dunkin' Donuts Thanksgiving Day Parade
