= Sally Starr (TV hostess) =

American celebrity television personality (1923–2013)

- Born: Alleen Mae Beller; January 25, 1923; Kansas City, Missouri, U.S.
- Died: January 27, 2013 (aged 90); Berlin, New Jersey, U.S.
- Occupation: Entertainer
- Years active: 1935–2006

Alleen Mae Beller (January 25, 1923 – January 27, 2013), also known as Sally Starr, was a prominent 1950s and 1960s celebrity television personality. Using a cowgirl persona, she appealed to local TV audiences of several generations of children through American radio, Broadway stage, movies and as a recording artist for more than sixty years. Fans remained loyal in the Philadelphia metropolitan area and embraced her cowgirl personality as part of their own family identity, and sometimes referred to her as "Aunt Sally" or "Our Gal Sal."

Her numerous personal appearances at events were an attraction for both children and adults. In paying tribute to her following her death, popular Philadelphia disc jockey Jerry Blavat, said of Starr:

"She was someone who was pure. Her persona was always Sally Starr. She understood the importance of being a personality on and off the air. She was always in costume. She represented the true style of what it was to be a personality."

Sally Starr was the first top-rated female disc jockey in the United States. She worked as an announcer, writer and producer, while also appearing on stage and in movies. She established herself as a pioneer in the history of early broadcast television and radio in the United States.

== Biography ==
Starr was born as Alleen Mae Beller in Kansas City, Missouri, and legally changed her name to Starr in 1941. She was the second oldest of five girls. Her parents, Charles and Bertha Beller, encouraged her to enter the world of show business, for which she exhibited both talent and ambition. At the age of twelve, she and her sister Mildred, who were billed as the "Little Missouri Maids," made their debut on the CBS radio program "Brush Creek Follies".

== Broadcast, acting, and recording artist ==
Her broadcast and entertainment career began with creation of the character of a blonde cowgirl who hosted an afternoon children's program for Philadelphia station WFIL-TV (now WPVI) from the 1950s to 1971. Her program was usually known as Popeye Theater or a variation, which presented Popeye cartoons and Three Stooges shorts. The theme song of the show was a variation on the theme from Wagon Train by Jerome Moross. She was also briefly the host of Starr Theater, which ran after Popeye Theater, and presented a cowboy movie. The program ran from the 1950s through 1971. She hosted a number of guest visitors including the Three Stooges and Colonel Sanders, plus local legends Dick Clark and Chief Halftown.

She distinguished her character by donning flashy cowgirl regalia, including a cowgirl hat, boots, and gun with holster, often dressing in bright red blouses adorned with fringes and shiny stars. Her opening line was, "Hope you feel as good as you look, 'cause you sure look good to your gal Sal." She closed with "May the Good Lord be blessing you and your family. Bye for now!" Public appearances were a staple part of her entertainment promotions. Many of these events also featured her horses "Pal", "Silver", "Cane", and "Rusty". She continued to make public appearances near her home in Waterford Township in southern New Jersey in her senior years. She also hosted a radio show on WVLT, 92.1 FM in Vineland, New Jersey until retiring in September 2006.

Aside from her television and recording career, Starr appeared in the Three Stooges feature film, The Outlaws Is Coming, as sharpshooter Belle Starr. She had small roles in such films as The In Crowd and Mannequin Two: On the Move.

A vocalist, she recorded Our Gal Sal, backed by Bill Haley & His Comets in 1958, selling thousands of records under the Clymax label. Haley also co-wrote "A.B.C. Rock" and "Rocky the Rockin' Rabbit" for Starr, which were released as singles (the former would later be covered by Haley himself; the latter was released in 1959 as a standalone single unconnected with the album). Although Our Gal Sal was out of print by the 1960s, in the 1970s and 1980s several of these recordings reappeared on a series of compilation albums put out by the UK-based Rollercoaster Records label entitled Rockaphilly. The first top-rated female disc jockey in the country, she also worked as an announcer, writer and producer while also appearing on stage and in movies. In her later years, Starr operated a pizza/ice cream restaurant in Atco, New Jersey.

Starr also wrote an autobiography, Me, Thee & TV, which was published in 1994.

=== Awards and honors ===
Starr was inducted into the Broadcast Pioneers of Philadelphia Hall of Fame in 1995.

== Illness and death ==
On New Year's Eve in 1992, Starr suffered a severe heart attack. Following medical treatment, she completed her recuperation during early 1993 while residing at the home of her sister, Mary Boyd. Hundreds of her fans reportedly sent get well cards, artwork, and gifts.

Starr died at a Berlin, New Jersey nursing home on January 27, 2013, two days after her 90th birthday, from undisclosed causes.
