= Wally Kennedy =

American television and radio announcer (1948–2024)

Wally Kennedy (1948 – October 30, 2024) was an American television and radio announcer in Philadelphia. He hosted AM Philadelphia (later AM Live), Philly After Midnight, and Inside Story on WPVI-TV over a twenty-year period.

== Early life ==
Kennedy was a native of Chicago, where he graduated from Columbia College Chicago.

== Career ==
His programs won their respective time periods in the Nielsen ratings, remaining the most successful talk programs in the TV market. He hosted a local, news-driven Sunday morning talk program, Sunday Live, on WPVI. He was among a handful of broadcasters to be honored by the Philadelphia City Council for outstanding service. He appeared on CNN, NBC and ABC television networks, at different times, to discuss stories he covered.

Kennedy was profiled in Philadelphia Magazine, The Philadelphia Inquirer, The Philadelphia Daily News and Philadelphia City Paper. In 2004, he left WPVI and joined the faculty at Temple University's School of Journalism as an adjunct professor. Prior to WPVI, he was at WCAU in Philadelphia and WSB Radio in Atlanta.

Kennedy was an anchor for KYW NewsRadio 1060 from 2006. He was also an adjunct professor at Immaculata University.

Following his selection by the board of directors, Kennedy was inducted into the Broadcast Pioneers of Philadelphia "Hall of Fame" in 2011.

== Personal life and death ==
Kennedy lived in Chester County, Pennsylvania, with his wife, Glendia, and had three children.

Kennedy died on October 30, 2024, at the age of 76.
