= Matt O'Donnell (journalist) =

American journalist (born 1972)

- Born: May 31, 1972 (age 53)
- Education: University of Delaware
- Title: Channel 6 Action News Anchor
- Website: Channel 6 Action News Bio

Matt O'Donnell (born May 31, 1972) joined WPVI-TV in 1996 as a general assignment reporter. In 2004, he was promoted to the morning anchor position with Sarah Bloomquist and currently anchors the morning newscast with Tamala Edwards, who joined the news team in 2005.
