= Marc Howard (news anchor) =

American journalist

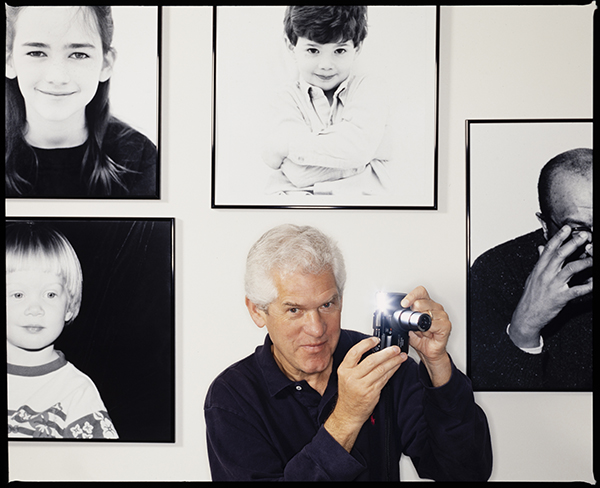
- Marc Howard in 1996
- Born: February 13, 1937 (age 89); Sharon, Pennsylvania, U.S.
- Occupation: Television news anchor

Marc Howard (born February 13, 1937) is a retired American news anchor based in Philadelphia. He last anchored at KYW-TV beginning in 2003 when he fronted the late newscasts, but soon only anchored the 4 p.m. news.

== Career ==
Howard's television career began at WFMJ-TV in Youngstown, Ohio. One of Howard's duties was hosting a late afternoon movie program called Showtime. While the program initially followed a mainstream movie format, during the Monster Craze of the 1960s, the program almost exclusively featured horror and sci-fi movies Monday through Friday. As host, Howard did not appear as a horror host character but as himself. He moved to New York City in 1967 as one of the original members of WNEW-TV's Ten O'Clock News team. After a brief reporting stint at WPRI-TV in Providence, Rhode Island, Howard returned to New York as a reporter for WPIX in 1968, staying there until 1970 when he took a job as press secretary to Howard J. Samuels during his unsuccessful run for Governor of New York; he later returned to WPIX as a political reporter.

In December 1974 Howard moved to Hartford, Connecticut, to work for WFSB as a reporter and weekend anchor, and then arrived in Philadelphia on June 27, 1977 to become the 5:30 p.m. co-anchor of WPVI's Action News; the newscast would expand to an hour in 1981. Howard would work at Action News alongside Jim O'Brien and later forming a long-running partnership with Lisa Thomas-Laury beginning in 1983.

In late 2002, he left after being hired at KYW-TV to replace Larry Kane on the 11 P.M. newscast. In addition to his anchoring duties, Howard also hosted the locally produced public affairs program Newsmakers, which focuses on a variety of political issues, both local and national, and airs on KYW-TV on Sunday mornings.

He retired from anchoring on November 30, 2007, ending a broadcasting career that began at WPIC 790 am in his hometown of Sharon, Pennsylvania.

== Notes ==
Media offices
Preceded by Larry Kane	CBS 3 6pm & 11pm Eyewitness news anchor 2003	Succeeded by Larry Mendte & Alycia Lane
