= Patricia Merbreier =

American actress (1924 - 2011)

Patricia "Pat" Merbreier (July 12, 1924 – June 23, 2011) was an American television personality and actress. She was best known for playing Mrs. Noah on the Philadelphia-based WPVI syndicated children's program, Captain Noah and His Magical Ark, for approximately 3,600 episodes between 1967 and 1994. Her real life husband, W. Carter Merbreier, who played Captain Noah, created and co-hosted the show.

Born Patricia Bosley, she majored in vocal studies at Oberlin College. she began singing opera in Cleveland, Ohio in 1946. Merbreier switched to roles in television commercials as television gained popularity. She also worked as an "industrial show entrepreneur" and a model, according to an article published by the Philadelphia Inquirer in 1975.

Merbreier's husband, W. Carter Merbreier, an ordained Lutheran minister, created Captain Noah and His Magical Ark in 1967 in conjunction with the Philadelphia Council of Churches. It initially started as a religious program, but switched to a children's television format in 1970. Pat Merbreier co-hosted the show as Mrs. Noah alongside her husband from 1967 to 1994. In addition to co-hosting the series as "Mrs. Noah", she also acted as the show's chief puppeteer. Funding for the original puppeteer's salary ran out during the show's 13th week on-air, so Pat Merbreier took over the role. Some of her more well known puppets included Maurice the Mouse, Mumwup the Monster and Wally the Walrus.

The show was syndicated and broadcast to television stations in twenty-two media market nationwide at its peak popularity. Numerous celebrities appeared opposite Merbreier during the course of the show, including Jon Stewart, Elvis Presley, Jim Henson, Charles Barkley and the Philly Phanatic, who was introduced to the public on the Captain Noah show in April 1978. The Merbreiers decided to retire and end the show in 1994.

Patricia Merbreier was a member of the Philadelphia Broadcast Pioneers Hall of Fame. In 2001, the Broadcast Pioneers of Philadelphia jointly honored W. Carter and Patricia Merbreier as their "Persons of the Year". Both insisted that their names be listed as Captain Noah and Mrs. Noah on their award.

== Death ==
She died at her home at the Shannondell in Audubon, Pennsylvania, after a long illness, on June 23, 2011, aged 86. Her funeral and burial was held at the St. Paul's Evangelical Lutheran Church in Ardmore. She was survived by her husband, W. Carter Merbreier and their daughter, Pam Cowie, as well as two granddaughters and four great-grandchildren.
