= Alycia Lane =

American television journalist (born 1972)

- Born: May 10, 1972 (age 54); Lake Grove, New York, U.S.
- Education: University at Albany, SUNY (BA); Medill School of Journalism (MA)
- Occupation: Television journalist
- Title: Newscaster
- Spouses: Dino Calandriello (m. 2000; div. 2004); Jay Adkins (m. 2005; div. 2007)
- Children: 1

Alycia Lane (born May 10, 1972) is a former American television journalist. Until October 2013, she served as weekday morning anchor at KNBC-TV in Los Angeles. From September 2003 until January 2008, she was co-anchor of the weekday evening newscasts on KYW-TV in Philadelphia, Pennsylvania. Lane's contract with KYW-TV was terminated shortly after being arrested for allegedly striking a New York police officer and calling her a homophobic slur.

== Background ==
Lane, a native of Lake Grove, New York, is of Puerto Rican descent on her mother's side and Welsh descent on her father's. She has a master's degree in Broadcast Journalism from the Medill School of Journalism at Northwestern University, and an undergraduate degree from the State University of New York at Albany, where she graduated with honors. She is a member of the National Association of Hispanic Journalists and speaks fluent Spanish. Lane has been married twice and gave birth to a daughter in June 2014.

== Career ==
Lane's television career began while completing her master's degree at Northwestern University, serving as a Washington, D.C.–based reporter for KSNT in Topeka, Kansas. After completing her studies, she returned to New York and joined Cablevision-owned News 12 the Bronx, where she served as an anchor and reporter. Among the stories she covered there was the 1999 shooting of African immigrant Amadou Diallo, who was shot to death by four New York City police officers.

In 2000, Lane moved to Miami, after being hired as a reporter for Fox affiliate WSVN. She joined a rival station, NBC-owned WTVJ a year later and spent two years there before moving to Philadelphia and CBS-owned KYW-TV in September 2003. KYW-TV paired her with Larry Mendte on their 11:00 p.m. edition of CBS 3 Eyewitness News. Mendte had been wooed away from rival WCAU-TV where he led the station to #1 in the ratings in some newscast slots for the first time in 30 years. By early 2004 KYW-TV had experienced "an amazing 61%" rise in the show's ratings. In 2005, she was awarded a local Emmy Award for co-hosting the annual "Holiday Traditions" special.

After her stint at KYW-TV, Lane moved to Los Angeles in July 2009 and was hired by NBC-owned KNBC on August 18. She debuted on the air on August 29 as anchor of the weekend editions of the Channel 4 News where she replaced Kim Baldonado. In February 2010, Lane became co-anchor of Today in L.A. on KNBC. In 2011, Lane received a National Edward R. Murrow Award for Writing on a special story about Angelman syndrome. In addition, she has won multiple local Emmy Awards at KNBC, along with two Golden Mic Awards.

In October 2013, KNBC announced that Lane was no longer employed by the station.

== Scandals ==
=== Bikini pictures ===
In May 2007, Lane became the center of a national media story when reports surfaced that she emailed pictures of herself and friends, in bikinis, to the NFL Network's Rich Eisen, via an account that he shared with his wife, Suzy Shuster. Shuster's email response became public. Lane insisted that the pictures were harmless and that she and Eisen have been "purely platonic" friends "for almost 10 years", and that they "regularly exchange e-mail and photos". In June 2010, CBS released emails between Lane and Eisen that suggested something more than a friendly relationship. The emails were released as part of a pre-trial motion in Lane's wrongful termination suit against CBS.

=== Assault charges ===
Lane was arrested in the early morning hours of December 16, 2007, in New York City, accused of physically and verbally assaulting a female police officer, as well as making homophobic comments, calling the officer a "fucking dyke". Lane was charged with one felony count of assault on a police officer. The criminal case was effectively closed on February 25, 2008, when a New York judge dropped the felony assault charges against her and reduced Lane's charges to misdemeanors. The case was then adjourned, with an additional provision that the charges against Lane would be dropped on the condition that she is not arrested, at any time, over the next six months. A New York City Police Association expressed "outrage" over the reduction and dismissal of charges against Lane.

== Dismissal from KYW-TV ==
On January 7, 2008, while suspended from KYW-TV for the assault on a New York police officer, the station announced that Lane had been released from her contract. In a statement, the station explained the decision to terminate Lane, stating:

After assessing the overall impact of a series of incidents resulting from judgments she has made ... we have concluded that it would be impossible for Alycia to continue to report the news as she, herself, has become the focus of so many news stories.

Lane's legal counsel, Paul Rosen, subsequently released a statement which challenged the station's reasoning:

The termination comes at a time when there has been absolutely no determination that Alycia is guilty of any wrongful conduct, and after KYW-TV has aired her categorical denial of the alleged charge that is pending against her. The termination is unfair because Alycia has never had an opportunity to defend against this charge, and tell her side of the story publicly, before KYW-TV has taken this unusual and unwarranted step to terminate her employment.

On January 30, 2008, Lane's lawyers filed a writ of summons on her behalf, a preemptive move towards a lawsuit against KYW-TV in connection with her dismissal. On February 19, 2008, lawyers for CBS, KYW-TV's parent company, sought to move Lane's state court writ to the U.S. District Court in Philadelphia, though a provision in Lane's contract stated that employment disputes were to be handled in New York, where the network is headquartered.

On June 19, 2008, Lane filed suit against KYW-TV and station manager Michael Colleran alleging that she was exploited and defamed. On December 12, 2013, Lane's lawsuit against CBS was dismissed after a hearing determined that Lane purposely destroyed evidence in the case. Philadelphia Common Pleas Court Judge Alan Tereshko ruled that it would be impossible for CBS to defend itself without Lane's laptop. In March, Tereshko also dismissed Lane's lawsuit against Mendte for the same reason.

== E-mail incident ==
On May 31, 2008, The Philadelphia Inquirer reported that Larry Mendte, Alycia Lane's former co-anchor, was under investigation by the FBI for allegedly reading Lane's private e-mail, and for feeding her private information to gossip columnists over the years including Dan Gross of the Philadelphia Daily News. On July 21, 2008, Mendte was charged with one felony count of intentionally accessing a protected computer without authorization. In August 2008, Mendte pleaded guilty and in November 2008 he was sentenced to three years' probation and six months' home confinement. Alycia Lane sued Larry Mendte, CBS, and the former general manager of KYW-TV over the incident. In December 2012 the suit against CBS was thrown out after the judge found that Alycia Lane had destroyed evidence. The suit against Mendte was settled in 2016.

Preceded by Marc Howard	CBS 3 6pm & 11pm Eyewitness news anchor 2003 – 2007 (with Larry Mendte)	Succeeded by Larry Mendte & Susan Barnett
