= WPSG =

Television station in Philadelphia

ATSC 3.0 station
- Philadelphia, Pennsylvania; United States
- Channels: Digital: 33 (UHF); Virtual: 57
- Branding: Philly 57

Programming
- Affiliations: 57.1: Independent; for others, see § Subchannels

Ownership
- Owner: CBS Television Stations; (Philadelphia Television Station WPSG, Inc.)
- Sister stations: KYW-TV

History
- First air date: June 15, 1981
- Former call signs: WWSG-TV (1981–1985); WGBS-TV (1985–1995)
- Former channel numbers: Analog: 57 (UHF, 1981–2009); Digital: 32 (UHF, 2002–2019)
- Former affiliations: FNN (1981–1983); SelecTV (1981–1983); PRISM (1983–1985); Independent (1985–1995); UPN (1995–2006); The CW (2006–2023)
- Call sign meaning: Forerunner owner Paramount Stations Group

Technical information
- Licensing authority: FCC
- Facility ID: 12499
- ERP: 1,000 kW
- HAAT: 386.7 m (1,269 ft)
- Transmitter coordinates: 40°2′33″N 75°14′32″W

Links
- Public license information: Public file; LMS
- Website: www.cbsnews.com/philadelphia/philly-57/

WPSG (channel 57), branded as Philly 57, is an independent television station in Philadelphia, Pennsylvania, United States. It is owned by the CBS Television Stations group alongside CBS outlet KYW-TV (channel 3). The two stations share studios on Hamilton Street north of Center City Philadelphia; WPSG's transmitter is located in the city's Roxborough section.

Channel 57 was allocated for commercial use in Philadelphia at the start of the 1970s; it was fought over by two groups who sought to broadcast subscription television (STV) programming to paying customers in the metropolitan area. Radio Broadcasting Company prevailed and launched WWSG-TV on June 15, 1981. It offered limited financial news programming, which was abandoned after 18 months, and a subscription service utilizing programming from SelecTV. Two years later, the station switched to broadcasting PRISM, a premium regional sports and movies service seeking to reach potential subscribers in areas beyond cable coverage, such as the city of Philadelphia.

The Grant Broadcasting System acquired the station and relaunched it in 1985 as general-entertainment independent WGBS-TV, known on air as "Philly 57". The new owners spent millions of dollars on programming and the rights to Philadelphia Flyers hockey and Villanova Wildcats basketball; the station filled the third independent void left when WKBS-TV (channel 48) folded in 1983, and its entrance into the market clipped multiple separate efforts to establish such a station. However, Grant's strategy to build "full-grown" independents with expensive acquisitions drove the company into bankruptcy in December 1986. Grant's three stations were assumed by a consortium of creditors and bondholders known as Combined Broadcasting; management was controlled from Philadelphia. Combined Broadcasting solicited offers on its stations in 1993; a deal was reached to sell to the Fox network, but an objection caused the sale to be delayed and canceled.

In 1995, Paramount Stations Group acquired WGBS-TV, which then became an owned-and-operated station of the United Paramount Network (UPN) under new WPSG call letters. Paramount returned professional sports to the station after an absence of several years; from the late 1990s to the late 2000s, Flyers, Philadelphia 76ers basketball, and Philadelphia Phillies baseball games were broadcast on channel 57. Paramount's corporate parent, Viacom, merged with CBS in 2000, and WPSG's operations were merged with those of KYW-TV. Upon the merger of The WB and UPN into The CW in 2006, channel 57 began broadcasting that network's programming; after CBS sold most of its stake in the network to Nexstar Media Group in 2022, CBS disaffiliated its eight CW stations from the network effective September 1, 2023. Since the CBS merger, there have been several instances of local news programming on the station.

== History ==
=== WWSG-TV: The STV years ===
Channel 57 had been assigned to Philadelphia as an educational channel, but in 1970, Vue-Metrics, Inc. expressed interest in starting a station in Philadelphia. Its goal was to broadcast over-the-air subscription television (STV) programming on the station—in fact, Vue-Metrics filed the first request to the Federal Communications Commission (FCC) for regular authorization. It originally filed for channel 23, but the FCC was in the process of redesignating that channel for educational use at Camden, New Jersey, leading to the designation of channel 57 for commercial use in Philadelphia. Vue-Metrics was not the only company to express interest in channel 57 as a conduit for STV: Radio Broadcasting Company (RBC) applied on December 24, 1971, for the channel. The two groups proposed different systems for delivering the STV service. Vue-Metrics specified the use of the Phonevision system by Zenith Electronics, while RBC intended to use equipment made by Blonder-Tongue.

A designation of the Vue-Metrics and Radio Broadcasting Company applications for comparative hearing did not come until June 24, 1976; issues to be raised in the hearing primarily centered around the finances of each bidder. An initial decision from an FCC hearing examiner, favoring Radio Broadcasting Company, was issued in September 1977. By this time, there had been substantial changes in the proposal. Instead of Phonevision, the subscription operation proposed for channel 57 would be a franchisee of ON TV, whose first service in Los Angeles had launched that March, and use equipment developed by one of ON TV's owners, Oak Industries. The examiner's initial decision did not represent an immediate green light to start building. Vue-Metrics, which was now headed by Robert S. Block (whose SelecTV was about to launch), had appealed the examiner's earlier move to dismiss its application as incomplete to the full FCC. The commission upheld the initial decision in October 1978. Construction began in 1979, with the company opting to begin the process of erecting facilities in the Manayunk area despite Vue-Metrics continuing its appeals in federal court.

On June 15, 1981, WWSG-TV—named for RBC owner William S. Gross—took to the air for the first time with the movie The North Avenue Irregulars. Its first program broadcasts were entirely scrambled and seen by next to nobody: there were fewer than 50 installed households, all of them belonging to station employees. Even though its STV service used Oak equipment, it utilized movies from SelecTV, Oak's primary competitor. WWSG-TV joined a series of communications-related businesses under the RBC umbrella, including mobile paging, background music, and the distribution of HBO to area multipoint microwave services. Delays in the launch of its daytime commercial program provider, the new Financial News Network (FNN), postponed the start of non-STV broadcasts to November 30. With FNN on air, the station aired financial programming and talk shows from 9 a.m. to 8 p.m., when STV service began.

WWSG-TV's SelecTV was not the only subscription service to enter the Delaware Valley in 1981. Later that year, Wometco Home Theater (WHT) expanded south from its base in New York City by launching on WRBV-TV (channel 65) in Vineland, New Jersey. Even though SelecTV got on the air first, WHT initially took the lead in subscribers. By January 1983, WHT had 20,000 subscribers to SelecTV's 12,000. After subscription TV was deregulated by the FCC in 1982, removing a rule that stations had to provide 28 hours a week of free programs, WWSG-TV dropped FNN programming and began offering SelecTV around the clock on January 9, 1983.

1983 was a year of change for channel 57. In January, The Philadelphia Inquirer reported that a consortium led by Oak and Ed Snider, owner of the Philadelphia Flyers hockey team, was seeking to buy WWSG-TV from RBC. Their proposal would replace SelecTV with an STV broadcast of regional premium cable service PRISM, which offered feature films and telecasts of home games of the Flyers, Philadelphia 76ers, and Philadelphia Phillies. A sale never transpired; in September, RBC reached a two-year deal to begin broadcasting PRISM on October 31, with the goal being to reach the city of Philadelphia, which did not have any cable service at the time. Even though subscribers would pay $3 more per month to watch PRISM than they had for SelecTV, very few subscribers opted to discontinue service, and the new availability of PRISM's sports coverage led to a surge in interest; a waiting list was necessary because RBC could not procure new decoders fast enough.

In its first unscrambled sports telecast in history, the station aired a Flyers telecast on November 15, 1984—Bobby Clarke Night—that was available to non-subscribers. The success of PRISM as a subscription service led WHT to leave the Philadelphia market at the end of November 1984.

=== WGBS-TV: The Grant years ===
We are not out to build a television station. We are out to come on full-grown.

— Milton Grant

At the start of 1985, rumors began to swirl that WWSG-TV was about to be sold and turned into a full-time ad-supported commercial station. Milton Grant, an independent station builder who had just put WBFS-TV on the air in Miami the year prior, was buying the rights to show various syndicated reruns, such as Dallas and Eight Is Enough, in the Philadelphia market, contingent on the purchase of channel 57. In March, the rumors were confirmed: Grant's company, Grant Broadcasting System (GBS), was purchasing WWSG-TV from RBC for $30 million at the same time that the Gross family sought to buy WWAC-TV in Atlantic City, New Jersey. Grant intended not only to convert channel 57 to ad-supported programming but upgrade its underpowered transmitting facility to the UHF maximum of five million watts. The filing of the application revealed that RBC had lost nearly $750,000 since 1981 on its STV venture. This compared with the $32.5 million RBC had made the year before by selling its successful paging business to communications conglomerate Metromedia. In the sale, Gross retained lifetime rights to conduct datacasting in the vertical blanking interval of the television station, which he used to start a business transmitting text information to scrolling displays in bars and restaurants. On October 20, 1985, WWSG-TV became WGBS-TV—call letters representing the Grant Broadcasting System—operating from studios on 20th Street and branding as Philly 57.

Grant promised to "come on full-grown" with his new channel 57, and his company was able to make splashy acquisitions in part because Philadelphia only had two independent stations. The station that had been the third independent in the market, WKBS-TV (channel 48), had been shuttered in 1983 owing to the dissolution of its owner, Field Communications. When Grant inquired who had the rights to air Villanova men's basketball, the answer was nobody: there had been no regular broadcasts of the Philadelphia Big 5 since channel 48 left the air. GBS, seeking to mirror the tentpole sports acquisitions it had made in Miami, signed a three-year deal for at least 20 Villanova basketball games and telecasts of the revived Villanova football team, worth nearly $1 million. Three months later, the Flyers ended a 15-year relationship with WTAF-TV (channel 29) to become the primary sports attraction on channel 57 as part of a $3.3 million contract; the team cited the recent purchase of the Phillies by a group headed by Taft Broadcasting, WTAF-TV's owner. The start of the first season of WGBS-TV was marred by the fact that not all cable systems added it to their lineups in the wake of must-carry regulations being struck down by a federal court earlier that year; this slightly limited the station's reach, particularly compared to its independent competitors.

In the field of entertainment programming, Grant brought its free-spending ways to the Philadelphia market. This would send ripples through several other groups' plans to enter the market. At the time, channel 48 was in the comparative hearing stage for a new licensee, and one company, BCT Communications, withdrew from the contest in November 1985. The company's lawyer told The Inquirer, "I think Milt Grant was doing a pretty good number on tying up whatever programming was available." In July 1986, WTGI-TV launched from Wilmington, Delaware; channel 57's relaunch eclipsed its original programming plan, and the station switched to a home shopping and later multicultural format. Another competitor, WSJT-TV—the former WRBV-TV—took itself out of the running that same year by selling to the Home Shopping Network.

=== Grant bankruptcy and Combined Broadcasting ownership (1986–1993) ===
Grant Broadcasting System launched a third major-market independent, WGBO-TV in Chicago, in January 1986 after purchasing the former WFBN late in 1985. However, a flat advertising market and the high prices paid for syndicated programming combined to fuel substantial losses at GBS. On December 8, 1986, GBS filed for federal bankruptcy protection in Philadelphia, seeking to avoid its creditors forcing it into involuntary bankruptcy. In 1986, WGBS-TV lost $9.72 million, which was more than the $6.54 million lost by WBFS-TV in Miami but less than WGBO-TV's $13.76 million loss for the year; the company as a whole lost $35.96 million. The flat market, higher programming costs, and defensive maneuvers by competing broadcasters had prevented Grant from achieving the same success he had with the strategy in the Dallas and Houston markets, where he built KTXA and KTXH and was able to sell them for a significant profit.

In a March 1987 bankruptcy court proceeding in Philadelphia, Grant was allowed to continue operating its stations until at least July 1 through cash and accounts receivables to fund operations, denying a motion by the company's creditors to assume control of the stations or force their sale. However, on July 7, Grant agreed to enter into receivership and turn over control of the company and its three stations to its television program suppliers and bondholders under a reorganization plan—which was formally filed on October 13 and approved on March 30, 1988—to repay $420 million in debt from the stations' operations by 1995, at which point the stations would be sold off. In July 1988, Combined Broadcasting, a creditor-controlled company, took over Grant and the three stations. Combined entered into new agreements that kept the Flyers and Villanova athletics on channel 57. While the company was based in Los Angeles, Philadelphia served as the hub for Combined management.

The Flyers left channel 57 for WPHL-TV in 1991; interest in the team had fallen after missing the playoffs in back-to-back seasons, and the station was lukewarm about renewal. Additionally, the new deal gradually decreased the team's over-the-air inventory.

=== Attempted sale to Fox (1993–1994) ===
In February 1993, Combined retained a bank to evaluate offers for the three ex-Grant stations. Six months later, Combined announced it had a buyer for WGBS-TV: Fox Television Stations, which would purchase channel 57 for $70 million and make it the new Fox station for Philadelphia, replacing WTXF-TV (the former WTAF-TV). WTXF-TV's owner, Paramount Stations Group (a subsidiary of Paramount Pictures), strongly criticized Fox's plans to pull its affiliation. It warned, "All affiliates of Fox should take note of the level of loyalty and commitment Fox has exhibited. Apparently Fox's loyalty only recognizes the partnership nature of a network affiliate's relationship when it is convenient to Fox's own economic interest." The move brought speculation of what was next for channel 57 as a Fox affiliate. With a switch that would have taken place in April 1994, at the end of channel 29's Fox affiliation agreement, the station was also seen as likely to start a local newsroom, providing the first competition to WTXF's 10 p.m. newscast. It also fueled existing speculation that Paramount was planning to join with Chris-Craft Industries to create a new network; when what eventually became the United Paramount Network (UPN) was announced that October as a joint venture of the two companies (with Paramount/Viacom holding only a programming partnership until it purchased 50 percent of the network in 1996), WTXF was named as its Philadelphia affiliate.

However, in November, legal opposition formed. The New York City chapter of the National Association for the Advancement of Colored People (NAACP) filed a formal objection to Fox's planned purchase of WGBS due to concerns about Fox's ownership structure. The NAACP contended that Fox's then-owner, News Corporation—based in Australia at the time—was the de facto parent company of Fox Television Stations' holding company, Twentieth Holdings Corporation (THC). News Corp's chairman, Rupert Murdoch, owned 76 percent of THC's stock in his own name; he had become an American citizen in 1985 so he could buy U.S. television stations. The NAACP contended that News Corp owned at least 36% of THC's stock, including all of the common stock, at a time when FCC regulations limited foreign ownership of broadcast outlets to 25 percent. As FCC approval did not come before the planned January 30, 1994, completion of the deal, Combined walked away from the $57 million sale a few weeks later after one extension, preserving WTXF's Fox affiliation. Even while the deal was still pending, however, other opportunities drew Fox's attention. In January, when Fox was rebuffed in a bid to purchase Group W—which included KYW-TV in Philadelphia—Mediaweek reported that another station executive found Fox lacking "its customary vigor" in trying to close the WGBS-TV deal.

The NAACP protest would have implications for Fox that outlasted its attempt to buy WGBS-TV. In June 1994, the FCC opened a foreign ownership review into Murdoch's existing station holdings; had it ruled negatively, a forced ownership change or license loss could have meant the end of the network. It was not until July 1995, when Fox won approval to buy television stations in Boston, Denver, and Memphis, Tennessee, that the foreign-ownership issue was resolved, removing a roadblock to purchases by the company.

=== WPSG: Sale to Paramount and UPN affiliation (1994–2006) ===
Later in 1994, in the context of a major realignment fueled by Fox's acquisition of rights to a package of National Football League games, Group W reached an agreement to align all five of its stations with CBS, resulting in affiliation switches at three of its five stations, including KYW-TV. New World Communications had recently partnered with Fox in most of the markets where the company owned stations and emerged as a candidate to purchase CBS's longtime owned-and-operated station WCAU-TV (channel 10). Fox also entered into the bidding for WCAU, just in case New World's offer fell through or New World chose to affiliate WCAU with NBC. However, on August 31, 1994, Viacom (which had acquired Paramount several months earlier) announced that it would sell WTXF to Fox for over $200 million; NBC and CBS then opted to make a complicated multi-market station swap which gave WCAU-TV to NBC. Using the cash received from Fox for channel 29, Viacom then bought WGBS and its Miami sister station, WBFS-TV. As soon as the deal was announced, Viacom announced that both stations would join UPN; channel 57 had not previously had a network affiliation confirmed.

UPN launched on January 16, 1995, with WGBS-TV as the Philadelphia affiliate. The Viacom acquisition of WGBS-TV and WBFS-TV closed in August, simultaneous with the sale of WTXF-TV, and on December 11, the station changed its call letters once more to reflect a new owner, this time becoming WPSG for Paramount Stations Group. Under Paramount, the station once again became a heavy sports broadcaster, with the help of local regional sports network Comcast SportsNet. After three seasons with no broadcast partner, the 76ers signed a deal with the station to air 21 games a season beginning in 1997. The Flyers returned to channel 57 for the 1998–1999 season, airing 20 regular-season games a year, after WPHL-TV objected to the preemptions of WB network programming that the team had generated in recent seasons. They were joined by the Phillies, for the first time in station history, which began airing 70 telecasts a season on WPSG in 1999.

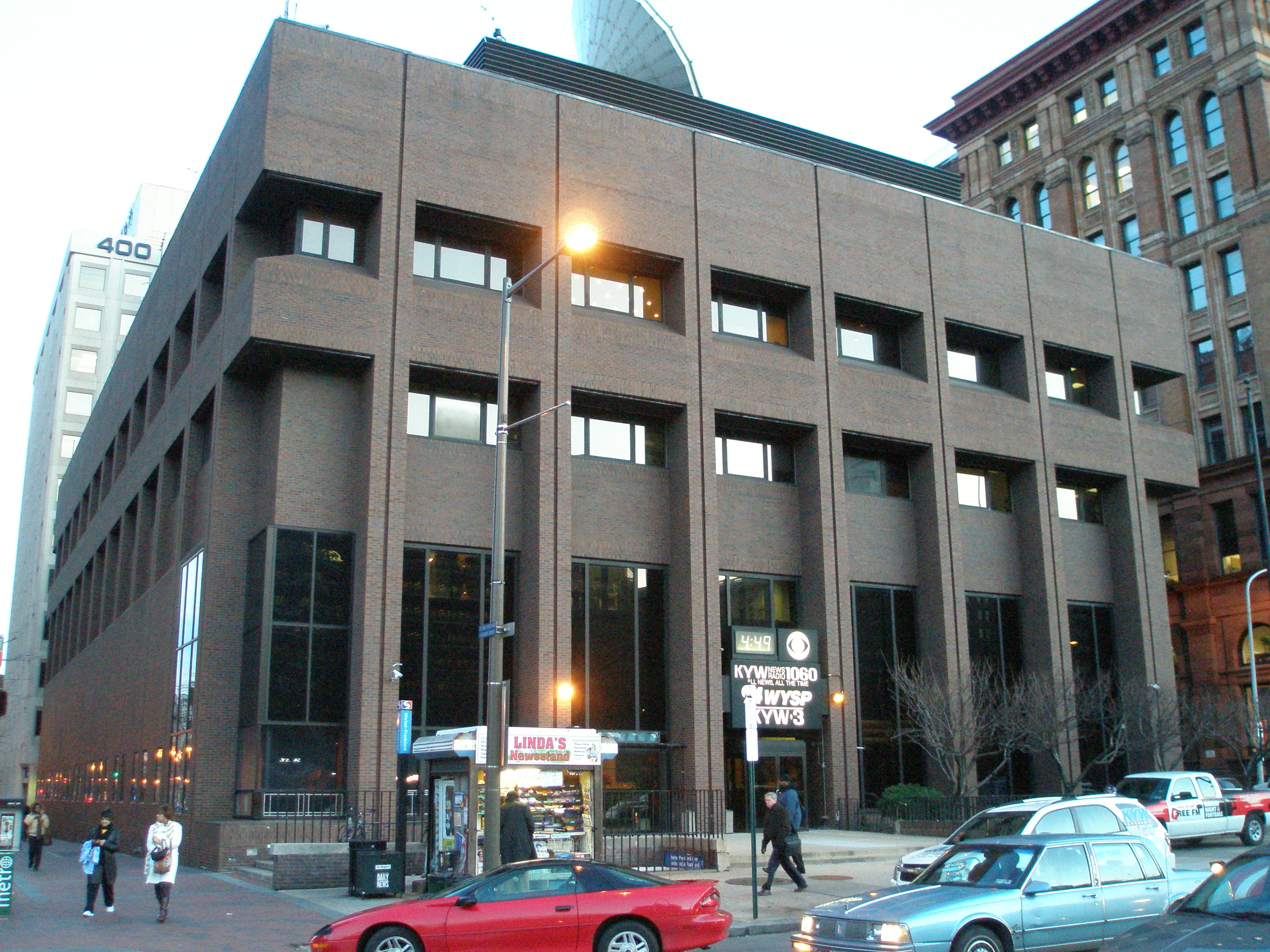
After the Viacom–CBS merger in 2000, WPSG moved into the Independence Mall studios (pictured) of KYW-TV.

In 1999, Paramount Stations Group acquired WNPA, the UPN affiliate in Pittsburgh. Immediately upon taking over that station, 19 people were laid off as Paramount moved all technical operations to WPSG in Philadelphia.

Viacom bought CBS in 2000, creating a duopoly with KYW-TV; that same year, Viacom also purchased Chris-Craft's 50% share of UPN for $5.5 billion. Though WPSG's operations were migrated into KYW-TV's studios at Independence Mall and the station started running prime time weather updates from KYW-TV meteorologists, separate general managers were retained for both stations, and the consolidation process moved gradually. CBS-owned KDKA-TV in Pittsburgh assumed operational responsibility for WNPA.

=== The CW Philly 57 (2006–2023) ===
Former logo as The CW Philly 57

On January 24, 2006, the Warner Bros. unit of Time Warner and CBS Corporation (which had been created as a result of the split of Viacom at the end of 2005) announced that the two companies would shut down The WB and UPN and combine the networks' respective programming to create a new "fifth" network called The CW; the day of the announcement, it was revealed that 11 of CBS Corporation's 15 UPN affiliates, including WPSG, would become CW stations. The station partially revived the "Philly 57" name upon the network change, becoming "CW Philly 57".

On April 2, 2007, WPSG and KYW-TV relocated their operations to new studios at 1500 Spring Garden Street in Philadelphia, near the Community College of Philadelphia; the former studio facility was then demolished to make way for the National Museum of American Jewish History. Meanwhile, the station gradually lost its sports franchises. After the 2008 season, the Phillies returned to WPHL-TV. In 2009, all local telecasts of Flyers and Sixers games moved to Comcast SportsNet and The Comcast Network.

WPSG shut down its analog signal, over UHF channel 57, on June 12, 2009, as part of the federally mandated transition from analog to digital broadcasts. The station's digital signal continued to broadcast on its pre-transition UHF channel 32, using virtual channel 57. In 2019, the station was repacked from channel 32 to channel 33 as a result of the 2016 United States wireless spectrum auction. On December 4, 2019, CBS Corporation and Viacom re-merged to create ViacomCBS.

=== Return to independence (2023) ===
On October 3, 2022, Nexstar Media Group acquired majority ownership of The CW. Under the agreement, CBS was given the right to pull its affiliations from WPSG and its seven other CW stations which was exercised on May 5, 2023. On June 14, Nexstar-owned WPHL-TV, then a MyNetworkTV affiliate, was announced to assume the CW affiliation. Along with reverting to independent status on September 1, WPSG fully revived the "Philly 57" brand on-air as part of a larger rebranding process among the disaffiliated stations.

WPSG began serving as the Philadelphia market's lighthouse station for the ATSC 3.0 broadcast standard on August 10, 2023, with its channels hosted in ATSC 1.0 from among Philadelphia's other stations.

== Newscasts ==
In September 2002, KYW radio (1060 AM) and KYW-TV launched a weekday morning news program called KYW NewsRadio This Morning on WPSG. The broadcast was essentially an embellished radio newscast with simple graphics and video borrowed from KYW-TV. This was replaced in 2005 with Wake Up News, a similarly formatted program produced by Traffic Pulse (later known as Traffic.com).

KYW-TV began to produce a 10 p.m. newscast for WPSG on February 2, 2009. This partnership would extend into the mornings on June 29, 2009, when Wake Up News was replaced with a two-hour extension of KYW-TV's Eyewitness News This Morning. The morning newscast continued until June 2015, when it was canceled as part of major programming and staff changes. A morning newscast returned in January 2023, with a simulcast of CBS News Philadelphia's streaming 7 a.m. newscast.

On July 18, 2022, Eyewitness News at 10 on The CW Philly was changed to become CBS News Philadelphia Now on The CW Philly, a hybrid local/national newscast that launched across several CBS-owned CW affiliates and independent stations. Coinciding with the relaunch as an independent station in September 2023, this was replaced with an 8 p.m. newscast.

== Technical information ==
=== Subchannels ===
The station's ATSC 1.0 channels are carried on the multiplexed signals of other Philadelphia television stations:

Subchannels provided by WPSG (ATSC 1.0)
Subchannel	Res.	Short name	Programming	ATSC 1.0 host
57.1	720p	WPSG	Main WPSG programming	KYW-TV
57.2	480i	Nest	The Nest	WTXF-TV
57.3	480i	Confess	Confess by Nosey	WTXF-TV
57.4	480i	NOSEY	Nosey	WPVI-TV
57.5	480i	BLK365	365BLK	WPVI-TV

On August 10, 2023, WPSG became the ATSC 3.0 (NextGen TV) host station for Philadelphia, broadcasting from its transmitter in Roxborough.

Subchannels of WPSG (ATSC 3.0)
Subchannel	Res.	Short name	Programming
3.1	1080p	KYW-TV	CBS (KYW-TV)
6.1	1080p	WPVI-HD	ABC (WPVI-TV)
10.1	1080p	WCAU-TV	NBC (WCAU)
12.1	1080p	WHYY-NG	PBS (WHYY-TV)
29.1	1080p	WTXFDT	Fox (WTXF-TV)
57.1	1080p	WPSG	Main WPSG programming
65.1	1080p	WUVP-DT	Univision (WUVP-DT)

Subchannel broadcast with digital rights management
Subchannel streamed via the Internet
