= Larry Mendte =

American television news anchor and commentator

- Born: Lawrence David Mendte; January 16, 1957 (age 69); Lansdowne, Pennsylvania, U.S.
- Education: West Chester University (BA); Quinnipiac University (MS)
- Occupations: American television commentator and news anchor
- Years active: 1979–present
- Notable credit(s): Access Hollywood, WABC-TV, New York, WBBM-TV, Chicago, WCAU-TV, Philadelphia, KYW-TV, Philadelphia, WDPN-TV, Wilmington, Delaware, WJLP Middletown Township, New Jersey, WABC (AM), New York, KFMB-TV, San Diego, WCMH-TV, Columbus, Ohio
- Spouse: Dawn Stensland-Mendte (m. 2000)
- Children: 4

Lawrence David Mendte (born January 16, 1957) is a American television news anchor, commentator and host. He is the host of Mendte in the Morning on WOR radio in New York City, after spending a year at the station as news director and anchor. Mendte

Until 2022, Mendte hosted three TV shows, Jersey Matters, The Delaware Way, and Another Thing with Larry Mendte. Mendte also hosted The Larry Mendte Show on WABC (AM) in New York. He was heard on the Len Berman and Michael Riedel In-the-Morning Show, and wrote and delivered nightly commentaries at WPIX in New York City that were aired at TV stations across the country. He continued writing and delivering the commentaries on Another Thing with Larry Mendte, which airs in the New York and Philadelphia TV markets. Mendte was the first male host of the American syndicated television show Access Hollywood. From 2003 to mid-2008, he was the lead anchor of the 6pm and 11pm newscasts for KYW-TV (Channel 3), the CBS O&O in Philadelphia. After nearly two decades in last place, Mendte led the station to compete with first place WPVI-TV (Channel 6). KYW lured Mendte away from WCAU-TV (Channel 10), where he had anchored the 4, 6 and 11 pm newscasts and led the station to win news ratings in some time slots for the first time in 30 years.

== Biography ==
Born and raised in Lansdowne, Pennsylvania, a suburb of Philadelphia, he attended St. Philomena Catholic School elementary school. During this time, he began delivering the Philadelphia Bulletin. Mendte graduated from Monsignor Bonner High School in nearby Drexel Hill. In 2003, Mendte was inducted into the high school's Hall of Fame. He earned a B.A. in Communications from West Chester University and was named a distinguished alumnus. After giving a commencement address in 2006, Mendte was awarded the President's Medal for Service in recognition of his community work.

== Career ==
From 1984 to 1988, he was a weekend anchor on WABC, as well as fill-in sports anchor. He anchored the news and was an investigative reporter at WBBM in Chicago from 1991 to 1995. While at WBBM, Mendte's series of reports on school bus safety resulted in a new state law. Mendte won a record 27 Emmy Awards in Chicago and was twice named Best reporter by the Illinois Associated Press. He anchored the news at WCMH in Columbus, Ohio, WLYH in Lebanon, Pennsylvania (where he also did the sportscast), WTAJ in Altoona and KIEM in Eureka, California.

Mendte was a weather personality at San Diego's KFMB and also performed stand-up comedy in Southern California comedy clubs. Mendte wrote and produced a humor commentary feature called "How Come?" for the Paramount Studios syndicated program Hard Copy. Mendte was the first male host of Access Hollywood when the show debuted in 1996. He co-hosted Monday through Friday with Giselle Fernández and also co-hosted the weekend edition with future weekday host Nancy O'Dell. Mendte debuted "Access Hollywood" on September 9, 1996, with the words "Hello everyone, I'm Larry Mendte and this is Access Hollywood."

=== Returning home ===
Mendte left Access Hollywood in 1997 to return to Philadelphia and became the main anchor of WCAU (Channel 10)'s newscasts, including the 4 pm, 6pm and 11 pm programs, with the 4 pm show being the first on at that time in the market. He also created and hosted the Sunday morning news talk program Live at Issue. During his time at WCAU the 11 pm newscast outrated market leader WPVI (Channel 6) for the first time since the 1970s.

=== Anchoring at KYW ===
Mendte joined KYW in 2003 after being wooed from WCAU. KYW launched a massive "Make the Switch" promotional campaign when Mendte arrived. The idea for the campaign was Mendte's. He also helped reformat the newscast and introduced the "walking anchor" to KYW that he was famous for at WCAU. KYW's ratings immediately jumped with Mendte in the main seat with Alycia Lane co-anchoring, and within a year the station would overtake WCAU at 11 pm and 6 pm for second place. Lane was later fired in December 2007 after being charged with a felony for assaulting a female police officer in New York. Mendte then anchored solo for a short time before being teamed with Susan Barnett, but Mendte was fired in June 2008 after an investigation revealed he accessed Lane's email accounts.

While at KYW, Mendte also co-hosted the Eagles pre-game show from Lincoln Financial Field. Mendte wrote and directed several documentaries while at KYW, including "Stealing Lightning From The Sky," about Ben Franklin's kite experiment, "Alex Scott: A Stand for Hope," about the little girl who started Alex's Lemonade Stand, "The Children of 9/11," about the children who lost parents in the 9/11 attacks and "The Beanie Baby Soldier," about Corporal Stephen McGowan, a soldier who died in Iraq but left a legacy of caring for the Iraqi children. For his work, Mendte won over 50 regional Emmys at KYW.

=== Commentary for Tribune ===
In February 2010, Mendte returned to television with a nightly commentary on current events, originating from Tribune Broadcasting's WPIX in New York. This segment is also seen on WPHL-TV's 10 pm newscast (which, until September 2012, was produced by NBC's WCAU, a former employer of Mendte), WGN-TV in Chicago and several other Tribune and Local TV-owned stations across the country.

In June 2010, Mendte aired the first of several commentaries urging Congress to pass the "9/11 First Responders Health and Compensation Bill". Six months later when the bill was passed, Mendte was given several award from 9/11 First Responders organizations, including 2011 Humanitarian Award from the New York Fire Department's Columbia Association.

In 2011, 2012 2013, and 2014, and 2015, all five years he was eligible, Mendte won the New York regional Emmy award for Outstanding Commentary/Editorialist, setting a record and Mendte won a total of 8 Emmys during his time at WPIX. Aside from the record five Emmys for Outstanding Commentary/Editorialist, Mendte won in 2011 and 2014 for Outstanding Writer for his commentaries and for Outstanding Speciality Reporting in 2014 for his series of commentaries on the media.

=== Anchoring at WPIX ===
In October 2012, Mendte co-anchored with Kaity Tong the day that Hurricane Sandy pounded the New York City area. For the next ten days, he co-anchored an extended 5 and 10 pm newscast at WPIX with Jodi Applegate. In April 2013, Mendte solo anchored the coverage of the Boston Marathon bombing and then co-anchored 12 hours straight with Tamsen Fadal as Boston Police killed one of the suspects, Tamerlan Tsarnaev, in a shootout, and later captured his brother and second suspect, Dzhokhar Tsarnaev.

=== Trip to Libya ===
In April 2011, Mendte was the only journalist to travel with former Congressman Curt Weldon on a peace mission to end the conflict in Libya. It was promoted that Weldon would meet with Muammar Gaddafi and that Mendte might get an interview. But Gaddafi reportedly cancelled a face-to-face meeting after Weldon's op-ed piece in The New York Times ran on the same day as the scheduled meeting. But Weldon did return with direct communication between the Iraqi Prime Minister to Secretary of State Hillary Clinton and the promise that four detained journalists would be freed.

=== Philadelphia magazine ===
Mendte was a contributor to the online version of Philadelphia Magazinefrom 2010 to 2015. Mendte's post on the drowning death of his niece stands as one of the most read columns ever on the site. Mendte occasionally writes for the print version of the magazine including a feature article on his life after he was let go by KYW. Mendte wrote over 200 articles for the site in five years.

=== IQ 106.9 FM ===
Mendte made his return to the Philadelphia air waves on May 7, 2012, with the debut of WWIQ. Mendte started with the station as co-host of the morning drive from 5 am to 9 am with radio veteran Al Gardner, who is originally from Philadelphia and anchored the same format at WBT in Charlotte, North Carolina. Mendte provided commentary on news events in a format that is a mixture of talk and news. Mendte started solo hosting a talk show from 8:30 until 9 in July 2012. On October 1, 2012, Mendte's was expanded from 8:30 to 10 am. On the new show, Mendte broke the national story of the high school student who was bullied for wearing a Romney/Ryan T-shirt to class.

On December 31, 2012, Mendte was fired, claiming his tenure there was 'a big experiment'. The dismissal of Mendte only fueled speculation that the radio station was up for sale. After Mendte's firing, the station's ratings dropped in half from a 3.6 rating in November to 1.8 in January. In August 2013 it was announced that Merlin was selling the station to Educational Media Foundation.

=== WDPN and WJLP ===
In late June 2014, Mendte was hired by KJWP (now WDPN-TV), a station moved from Wyoming under an FCC loophole, which carries MeTV and is now licensed to Wilmington, Delaware, with a commitment to serve the state of Delaware. He served as the station's public affairs director and hosted two programs for the station. Aired on Saturday nights before primetime, they were The Delaware Way, a week-in-review rundown of state issues, and Another Thing with Larry Mendte, a more general news and commentary program which featured Mendte's traditional commentary segments.

In 2016, Mendte won a Mid-Atlantic Emmy award for in the category, Outstanding Writer News/Commentary for his commentaries that air at the conclusion of And Another Thing with Larry Mendte. It was Mendte's 95th Emmy award and was the first for WDPN.

Mendte also served as the public affairs director for WJLP, WDPN-TV's sister station in the New York market licensed to Middletown Township, New Jersey. Another Thing with Larry Mendte was also carried by WJLP, along with a New Jersey-specific program for WJLP hosted by Mendte, Jersey Matters. In 2016, Mendte won three more Emmy Awards, this time for WJLP in the New York Chapter of the National Academy of Television Arts and Sciences (NATAS). One was for On-Camera Talent: Commentator/Editorialist; one for Writer: Commentary/Editorial; and one for On-Camera Talent: Reporter - Specialty Assignment, for a series of reports called "Mendte on the Media".

=== WABC Radio ===
In June 2014, Mendte was hired by WABC (AM) radio in New York City to host a Sunday Night talk show called The Larry Mendte Show. He also fills in frequently for Geraldo Rivera and Curtis Sliwa during the week. Mendte has also filled in for Ronn Owens on KGO-AM radio in San Francisco.

Mendte returned to WABC in October 2016 to host The Larry Mendte Show on Saturday nights from 11 pm to 2 am.

On election night 2016, Mendte co-hosted the station's coverage with Rita Cosby.

=== iHeartMedia Delaware ===
In June 2015, Mendte was hired by iHeartMedia in Delaware, as the morning talk show anchor for WILM-AM in Wilmington, Delaware and WDOV-AM in Dover, Delaware. The Larry Mendte Show was heard from 5:30 to 9 am in both markets. After helping change the format from news to talk and increasing the morning ratings, Mendte returned to WABC in New York in October 2016.

== Honors ==
Mendte received acclaim for a series of reports he did on the eternal flame, a tribute to American veterans, in Philadelphia's historic Washington Square. Mendte highlighted the flame's failing infrastructure, forcing the city to take action to repair the natural gas line which provided the flame's fuel and relight it. His efforts were read into the Congressional record by U.S. Senator Rick Santorum (R-PA). Mendte was also honored with a regional Edward R. Murrow Award in the writing category for his reports on the eternal flame and a report on the Iraq War. He received a national Edward R. Murrow Award in 2008 for a report he wrote and produced about a soldier from Delaware, Stephen McGowan, who died in Iraq.

Mendte wrote, narrated and directed "Alex Scott: A Stand for Hope" in 2006. It told the story of the little girl who started Alex's Lemonade Stand to raise money to fight pediatric cancer, before dying of cancer. The documentary won several film festivals, including the West Chester Film Festival, where Mendte was named Pennsylvania Filmmaker of the year in 2006. Mendte also won the national Sigma Delta Chi Award from the Society of Professional Journalists in Washington D.C. for the documentary. The documentary was honored and placed on exhibit by The Paley Center for Media in New York in 2008.

In 2006, Mendte was inducted into the Broadcast Pioneers of Philadelphia Hall of Fame. Mendte has over 80 Regional Emmy Awards from the New York, San Diego, Chicago and Philadelphia markets, and holds the record in several categories in Philadelphia and Chicago. In Philadelphia, he has won a record 4 Emmy Awards in the Outstanding Anchor category and seven in various writing categories. In 2007, Mendte was named as one of the 75 Greatest Living Philadelphians by the Philadelphia Daily News in honor of the Philadelphia Eagles 75th anniversary.

Mendte is a member of the Halls of Fame of Saint Philomena, his elementary school in Lansdowne, Pennsylvania; Monsignor Bonner, his high school; and West Chester University, his college. He was inducted into the Philadelphia Broadcast Pioneers' Hall of Fame in 2006. Mendte is also a member of the Philadelphia Irish Americans Hall of Fame,

== Guilty plea ==
On August 22, 2008, Mendte pleaded guilty to the charge of intentionally accessing his co-anchor Alycia Lane's email account without authorization. Mendte read a statement and acknowledged having had an "improper relationship" with Lane. He said that he ended the relationship and it "quickly turned into a personal feud" and that a vengeful Lane was attempting to get him fired. On November 24, 2008, Mendte received a sentence of 3 years probation (later reduced), including 6 months home confinement and 150 hours of community service. Federal Judge Mary A. McLaughlin ended Mendte's probation and all other sentencing requirements.

Mendte continued to fight the felony conviction on several grounds. In a court filing, Mendte claimed that the U.S. Attorney promised a misdemeanor charge in return for his cooperation. Mendte and his attorney agreed to a proffer wherein Mendte told investigators the entire story. However, they claimed that the US Attorney informed them weeks later that they were going back on the deal and charging Mendte with a felony. In his post-sentence motion, Mendte's lawyer claimed his client's civil rights had been violated. The filing accuses then-U.S. Attorney Pat Meehan of changing the deal so he could hold a news conference to launch his political career. The filing details a purported early morning phone call wherein Meehan "beg[ged]" Mendte's attorney for a guilty plea before Meehan left office so that Meehan could make a "policy statement". The appeal was turned down by the United States Court of Appeals for the Third Circuit citing that Mendte pleaded guilty and gave up his rights to appeal.

== Family ==
Mendte has been married to Dawn Stensland, the former 10 pm news co-anchor at Fox's WTXF (Channel 29), since 2000. She came to Philadelphia in 1997 as an anchor for KYW, then anchored CBS News Saturday Morning for a year and a half. In the 1990s, she was an anchor and reporter at WBBM in Chicago, Illinois, and WKYC in Cleveland, Ohio. Together, they have two sons: Michael was born in 2004, and David was born in 2006. In addition, Mendte has two adult children, Stacia and Jonathan, from a previous marriage.

== Filmography ==
Mendte appeared in three movies in cameo roles: Primary Colors, Shadow of Doubt, and Snipes. He wrote and directed four short documentaries. Ben Franklin: Stealing Lightning from the Sky aired across the country on Benjamin Franklin's birthday in 2006. The documentary questioned whether Franklin really did conduct his famous kite experiment. Later that year, Mendte wrote and directed Alex Scott: A Stand for Hope, a short documentary about Alex Scott, founder of Alex's Lemonade Stand. Alex Scott: A Stand for Hope won the award for Best Documentary at the Reno, Oxford, Danville, West Chester, Lake Arrowhead and Reel Award film Festivals. Mendte was named best Pennsylvania Filmmaker for 2006 at the West Chester Film Festival.

Media offices
Preceded by none	Host of Access Hollywood with Giselle Fernández; 1996–1997	Succeeded by Pat O'Brien with Giselle Fernández
Preceded by Ken Matz & Renee Chenault-Fattah	NBC10 4pm, 6pm & 11pm NBC 10 anchor 1997 – 2003 with Renee Chenault-Fattah	Succeeded by Tim Lake & Renee Chenault-Fattah
Preceded by Marc Howard	CBS 3 6pm & 11pm Eyewitness news anchor 2003 – 2008 (with Alycia Lane) 12/2008 – 1/2008 (solo anchor) 2/2008 – 6/2008 (with Susan Barnett)	Succeeded by Chris May & Susan Barnett
