= Operation Alphabet (TV series) =

- Genre: Educational
- Starring: Alexander Shevlin
- Country of origin: United States
- Original language: English
- No. of seasons: 2
- No. of episodes: 190

Production
- Production locations: Philadelphia, Pennsylvania
- Running time: 30 minutes

Original release
- Network: WFIL-TV
- Release: 1961 – 1965

Operation Alphabet was a daily educational television program designed to teach literacy to adults. Produced in Philadelphia by WFIL-TV (now WPVI-TV) in association with the Philadelphia Junior Chamber of Commerce and the National Association for Public School Adult Education, the program was hosted by Alexander Shevlin of the Philadelphia Board of Education.

The series was designed to teach the basics of reading and writing to adults who were illiterate, using subjects that are relevant to adults; the program especially benefited immigrants, prisoners and those in the military. Operation Alphabet was not only one of the first educational programs to deal with literacy, it was one of the first to be aimed at an adult population, rather than towards children. Two series of the program were produced—the first (100 episodes), aimed for reading at a fourth-grade level, was produced in 1961; a second series (90 episodes), for reading at an eighth-grade level, was filmed in 1964. Each series was designed for daily, weekday telecasts.

In Philadelphia, WFIL-TV broadcast the series at 6 AM on weekdays—the station opted to place the program in that early time slot, so that adults could watch the program and take the coursework before going to work. The early hour also benefited the viewers, as they could learn to read without fear of embarrassment.

An instructional book published for the Civic Adult Education Project by Noble and Noble was designed as support material for the program, featuring supplementary material that correlated with each show. In many areas, tutoring service, supported by "The Clubwomen Across America", was offered to viewers to help reinforce the material presented in the program.

Operation Alphabet was also syndicated by WFIL-TV to commercial and educational television stations nationwide—stations received tapes or films of the program free of charge, provided that they were returned after broadcast.

WFIL-TV and the later WPVI-TV had regularly included Operation Alphabet in their daily schedules from its 1962 debut into the early 1980s, making it one of Philadelphia's longest-running programs, despite the fact that it was only in production in the early 1960s.
