= Let's Pop the Question =

American television series (1947–1948)

Let's Pop the Question is an American television series which aired from 1947 to 1948. While only aired on a single station, it is of some interest as an early example of a television game show. It aired on Philadelphia station WFIL-TV, and was a half-hour show. It is not known if it ever had a sponsor (it is listed in a 1947 edition of Billboard as not having one during the episode reviewed, see below). George Cahan was the host of the "telephone quizzer". In the show, pictures of famous people were shown, and contestants at home tried to identify them. There were also local celebrity guests. It is unlikely that any episodes survive of the series, as only a very tiny handful of kinescopes exist of 1940s local programming (mostly from New York City and Los Angeles, such as an episode of Swing Into Sports, a couple of episodes of Photographic Horizons, along with a few other kinescopes)

== Reception ==
November 22, 1947 edition of Billboard called the series "a lively and entertaining weekly half-hour stanza", and called the host "a cheerful and gracious lad". Billboard said it was one of the few genuinely entertaining series being produced in Philadelphia at the time.
