= CBS News Now =

Set of hybrid local/national newscasts

CBS News Now was the de facto umbrella title for a set of hybrid local/national newscasts produced by CBS News and Stations and aired on most of the group's CW affiliates or independent stations, with production led by the CBS Local News Innovation Lab at the studios of KTVT / KTXA in Fort Worth, Texas. In markets where the company has a full news operation, the newscast was named after the applicable CBS News Local streaming service, while in other markets (including those where CBS owns a station that carries the newscast, but the CBS network affiliate is owned by a third party) the title followed the format [Location] Now News.

The program, which generally aired at either 9:00 or 10:00 p.m. local time, included short local news and weather briefs, presented by a local anchor (or in some cases a surrogate anchor hosting remotely), but consisted mainly of nationally oriented news coverage produced in Fort Worth. The newscast's national anchors were Tom Hanson on weeknights and Trason Bragg on weekends.

The format debuted on July 18, 2022, on the following stations:

- WLNY-TV in Riverhead–New York (as CBS News New York Now at 9:00 on WLNY-TV 10/55)
- WPSG in Philadelphia (as CBS News Philadelphia Now at 10:00 on The CW Philly)
- KTXA in Fort Worth–Dallas (as CBS News Texas Now at 9:00 on TXA 21)
- WUPA in Atlanta (as Atlanta Now News at 10:00 on Atlanta's CW 69) (Note: Local segments produced remotely; the CBS affiliate in the market during this period produced local news but was owned by a third party.)
- KBCW in San Francisco (as CBS News Bay Area Now at 10:00 on KBCW)
- WSBK-TV in Boston (as CBS News Boston Now at 10:00 on TV38)
- KSTW in Seattle (as Seattle Now News at 10:00 on CW 11)
- WTOG in St. Petersburg/Tampa (as Tampa Bay Now News at 10:00 on CW 44)
- WKBD-TV in Detroit (as Detroit Now News at 10:00 on CW 50) (Note: Local segments initially produced remotely; CBS News Detroit launched in January 2023.)
- WBFS-TV in Miami (as CBS News Miami Now at 9:00 on TV33)

The program was discontinued in most markets on August 31, 2023, after CBS converted its CW affiliates to independent stations; in duopoly markets (excluding Detroit), the program was replaced with new 8:00 p.m. newscasts produced by the parent station's news department. As an exception, WUPA maintained the Atlanta Now News branding for a primetime newscast produced out of WCBS-TV, until becoming a CBS O&O and launching its own local news operation in 2025.

== See also ==
- News Central, similar newscasts produced by Sinclair Broadcast Group from 2002 to 2006
