= W. Carter Merbreier =

American television personality and minister

- Born: August 2, 1926; Pleasantville, New Jersey, U.S.
- Died: August 9, 2016 (aged 90); Audubon, Pennsylvania, U.S.
- Television: Captain Noah and His Magical Ark (1967 - 1994)
- Spouse: Patricia Merbreier
- Children: 1 daughter
- Parents: Adolphe Merbreier (father); Retta Carter (mother)

W. Carter Merbreier (August 2, 1926 – August 9, 2016) was an American television personality, ordained Lutheran minister and former police chaplain for the Philadelphia Police Department. Merbreier created and co-hosted the syndicated children's television series, Captain Noah and His Magical Ark, in 1967. The show aired until 1994.

Born to Adolphe and Retta (née Carter) Merbreier, Carter Merbreier (he apparently later added the initial "W.") co-hosted Captain Noah and His Magical Ark with his real-life wife, Patricia. He played Captain Noah while Patricia Merbreier played Mrs. Noah and acted as the show's puppeteer, beginning with its 13th week on the air. Merbreier originally created the series as a Sunday morning religious program, but switched the format to a children's show in 1970. The Philadelphia Council of Churches produced the show, which was filmed at the studios on WPVI (Channel 6). At its peak in the early 1970s, Merbreier's Captain Noah and His Magical Ark aired in syndication on twenty-two television stations throughout the United States and attracted a larger local Philadelphia audience than both Captain Kangaroo and Sesame Street combined.

Carter and Patricia Merbreier jointly decided to retire and end the show in 1994 after co-hosting approximately 3,600 episodes since 1967. They resided at their home in Gladwyne, Pennsylvania, following their retirement from the show.

In 2001, Carter and Patricia Merbreier were jointly named "Persons of the Year" by the Broadcast Pioneers of Philadelphia. Both insisted that their names be listed as Captain Noah and Mrs. Noah on the award. Carter Merbreier also served on the board of directors for the Broadcast Pioneers of Philadelphia. Patricia Merbreier died on June 23, 2011, aged 86, following a long illness. Merbreier died at the age of 90, on August 9, 2016, he was survived by his daughter and two grandchildren.
