= Junior Television Club =

- Genre: Children's television news magazine
- Presented by: Graham Phillips; Gregory Helm; Avril Campbell; Margaret Stott; Bobby Olson
- Country of origin: Canada
- Original language: English
- No. of seasons: 1

Production
- Producer: Ron Kelly
- Production locations: Vancouver, British Columbia, Canada
- Running time: 30 minutes

Original release
- Network: CBC
- Release: May 1 – June 26, 1957

Related
- Hidden Pages

Junior Television Club is a Canadian children's television news magazine program. It was broadcast on CBC Television from Vancouver, British Columbia, between May 1, 1957 and June 26, 1957. The show featured five preteen hosts, including 10-year-old Kim Campbell (then known as Avril Campbell), who later became Canada's first female prime minister. Campbell moderated discussions on subjects of responsibility, such as pocket money and the use of lipstick, and was also the host for guest performers.

The show aired Wednesdays at 5:00 pm for two months.
