= Captain Noah and His Magical Ark =

American children's television series

- Genre: Children's television series
- Starring: W. Carter Merbreier as Captain Noah; Patricia Merbreier as Mrs. Noah
- Opening theme: "Overture" from the 1958 film Windjammer, composed by Morton Gould
- Ending theme: "I Can Sing a Rainbow" by Arthur Hamilton
- Composer: Larry Ferrari
- Country of origin: United States
- Original language: English

Production
- Production company: Philadelphia Council of Churches

Original release
- Network: WPVI
- Release: 1967 – 1994

Captain Noah and His Magical Ark was a television program for children and was generally broadcast around the Philadelphia area. The series aired from 1967 to 1994. It was filmed and produced at the WPVI-TV, Channel 6 (then called WFIL when the program began) studios in Philadelphia, Pennsylvania.

Captain Noah and His Magical Ark, was created by W. Carter Merbreier, an ordained Lutheran minister and former Philadelphia police chaplain, and produced by the Philadelphia Council of Churches. The show initially aired as a religious program beginning in 1967 before switching to a children's program in 1970. The show starred Merbreier as Captain Noah and his real life wife, Patricia Merbreier, as Mrs. Noah.

At its height, Captain Noah and His Magical Ark was syndicated to 22 television stations in markets throughout the United States. During the early 1970s, Captain Noah and His Magical Ark attracted a larger local audience in the Philadelphia region than Sesame Street and Captain Kangaroo combined.

== Background ==
Started as a religious-oriented program, Captain Noah and His Magical Ark became a daily children's program in 1970. The show aired from 7:00 a.m. to 9 a.m. on weekdays and for 30 minutes on Sunday morning leading out of ABC Sunday-morning cartoons and into the Al Alberts Show. The show also featured four cartoon shorts per day during the week. These included Gumby, Popeye (the made for TV cartoons from the 1960s only), Porky Pig (pre-1940 and post-1947 episodes), and Bugs Bunny (post-1948 episodes).

In 1975, when ABC began their morning show Good Morning America, WPVI-TV opted to preempt that in favor of Captain Noah and His Magical Ark. Starting in September 1976, WPVI began running the 7:00 a.m. hour of Good Morning America and scaled Captain Noah back to the 8:00 a.m. to 9:00 a.m. slot. The format remained the same.

While Captain Noah, a former Lutheran minister, was the main "host" of the show, Mrs. Noah was the puppeteer and a trained singer. Famous Philadelphian entertainer Larry Ferrari provided the music. Favorite puppets included Maurice the Mouse, Mumwup the Monster, and Wally the Walrus.

In 1978, when the Popeye cartoons moved to WTAF-29 (now WTXF, Fox-29) and the Warner Brothers cartoons moved to Channel 17 WPHL-TV (later to 48 WKBS and then back to WPHL), WPVI dropped the weekday edition of Captain Noah and began running Good Morning America in its entirety. Captain Noah continued as a weekend program. It would run an hour on Saturday mornings and on that showing often contained the 8 a.m. cartoon (when it was a half-hour offering) offered by ABC within the show. On Sunday mornings, it now ran for 30 minutes before Kids Are People Too. For a while a 15-minute edition was inserted into the showing of Kids Are People Too. In 1983, Captain Noah was scaled back to 30 minutes on Saturday mornings and ran this way until 1994 with no cartoons inserted. The staples of the show were the puppets, cartoons and songs.

The theme song was, "I Can Sing a Rainbow" sung by Andy Williams. Another notable song that was played every episode was "Send Your Pictures to Dear Old Captain Noah". Celebrity guests on the show included Elvis Presley, Charles Barkley, Jon Stewart, Jim Henson, Martina Navratilova and Frank Perdue. The Phillie Phanatic, mascot of the Philadelphia Phillies, debuted to the public on the show in 1978.

Carter and Pat Merbreier jointly decided to retire and end the show in 1994. Captain and Mrs. Noah were both inducted into the Philadelphia Broadcast Pioneers Hall of Fame in 2001. They were also honored that year by the same organization as their Persons of the Year. A 35th anniversary show was aired in 2005 on WPVI from the Please Touch Museum.

The set of the show has been preserved at the Philadelphia's Please Touch Museum's new home at Memorial Hall in Fairmount Park, which opened on October 18, 2008.

The show is now repeated every Saturday at 8:30 a.m. on one of WPVI's digital feeds. The reruns generally consist of the last few seasons the show aired (1993 or 1994). Captain Noah was grand marshal of the "Night in Venice" boat parade in Ocean City, New Jersey, on Saturday July 24, 2010. Patricia Merbreier died at age 86 on June 23, 2011 in Philadelphia. W. Carter Merbrier died at age 90 on August 9, 2016, following a short illness; he was living in Audubon, Pennsylvania at the time of his death.

== Personal ==
Carter Merbreier, a.k.a. Captain Noah, and Patricia Merbreier had one daughter, Pamela. In October 2014, Carter Merbreier published the book Captain Noah and His Magical Ark, detailing his experiences as a children's television show host on WPVI for over 30 years.
