= Renee Chenault-Fattah =

American television news anchor, attorney and social justice activist

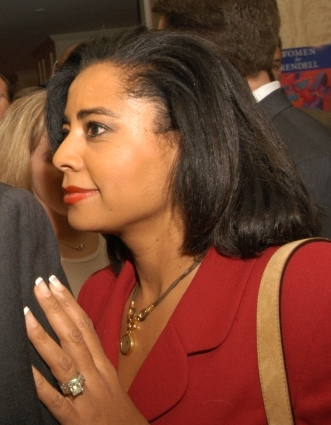
- Renee Chenault-Fattah in March 2007
- Born: Renée Yvette Chenault; October 12, 1957 (age 69); Littleton, Colorado, U.S.
- Other name: Renee Y. Chenault
- Education: University of Missouri; University of Pennsylvania Law School; Johns Hopkins University
- Occupations: NBC 10 (Philadelphia, PA) News Anchor
- Title: NBC 10 News Anchor
- Spouse: Chaka Fattah

Renee Chenault-Fattah (born October 12, 1957) is an American journalist and former co-anchor of the WCAU NBC 10 News at 4 and 6 p.m. on weeknights in Philadelphia. She worked as a lawyer in New York City in the 1980s. She is married to former U.S. Representative Chaka Fattah.

== Biography ==
=== Early life and education ===
Chenault-Fattah majored in political science at Johns Hopkins University, and went on to earn her J.D. at the University of Pennsylvania Law School. She worked at Hughes Hubbard & Reed, a law firm in New York, and then clerked for Judge Damon Keith of the Sixth Circuit Court of Appeals. She then began her media career, earning a master's degree in journalism at the University of Missouri in Columbia, Missouri.

=== Career ===
Chenault-Fattah joined WCAU, then the Philadelphia CBS TV affiliate, in September 1991, and served as an anchor and a reporter. After a few years anchoring the noon broadcast with Tim Lake, she was promoted to the 6 p.m. and 11 p.m. news in March 1995. By then, WCAU had become the NBC affiliate in Philadelphia. In 2003, Lake joined Chenault as co-anchor at 4 p.m., 6 p.m., and 11 p.m., after she had spent 8 years co-anchoring newscasts at 6 and 11, first with Ken Matz and then with Larry Mendte.

The criminal case involving her husband, Congressman Chaka Fattah, made it increasingly difficult for Chenault-Fattah to continue as an anchor, and she went on leave for seven months following his indictment. Ultimately, she left the station on February 24, 2016. Although she was mentioned in a business dealing of her husband's, Chenault-Fattah was never charged with anything in connection with the activities that ultimately led to his conviction.

Chenault-Fattah serves on the board of trustees of Johns Hopkins University.

After serving for several years on its board of directors, Chenault-Fattah was named Executive Director of Philadelphia Lawyers for Social Equity, a non-profit dedicated to assisting low-income Philadelphians in overcoming hurdles caused by past criminal records.

On June 30, 2025, Chenault-Fattah was appointed as the Executive Director of the Philadelphia Commission on Human Relations and the Philadelphia Commission on Fair Housing.

==== Honors and awards ====
Chenault-Fattah was named to the PoliticsPA list of "Sy Snyder's Power 50" list of influential individuals in Pennsylvania politics in 2002. She was also named to the PoliticsPA list of "Pennsylvania's Most Politically Powerful Women"

The Broadcast Pioneers of Philadelphia inducted Chenault-Fattah into their Hall of Fame in 2009.
