= Tamala Edwards =

American television news anchor and reporter

- Born: Tamala Monique Edwards; April 7, 1971 (age 55); Georgia, U.S.
- Education: B.A., Stanford University
- Years active: 1993 - present
- Television: Channel 6 Action News Mornings
- Title: Co-Anchor
- Website: Tamala Edwards

Tamala Monique Edwards (born April 7, 1971) is an American television news anchor and reporter.

She began her journalism career as a correspondent for Time magazine in 1993, eventually working in the Washington, D.C., bureau. In August 2001, she came to work for ABC News as a White House correspondent, later moving on to be a Washington, D.C.–based general correspondent appearing on World News Tonight and Good Morning America.

Edwards also anchored two ABC News newscasts, World News Now and World News This Morning and developed a bit of a cult following as several other World News Now anchors have.

In 2005, she moved to ABC owned and operated station WPVI-TV in Philadelphia, Pennsylvania, where she currently is the weekday morning Action News anchor and a feature reporter.

Edwards married Rocco Lugrine, executive pastry chef of Le Bec Fin, on September 19, 2006. They became first-time parents on August 31, 2009, when Tamala gave birth to a boy, Rocco Alexander Edwards Lugrine. Mrs. Edwards gave birth to another boy, Massimo John Edwards Lugrine, on September 11, 2012.

Her parents are Edith and Redick Edwards, who live in Houston, Texas.
