= Traynor Ora Halftown =

American entertainer (1917-2003)

Chief Halftown
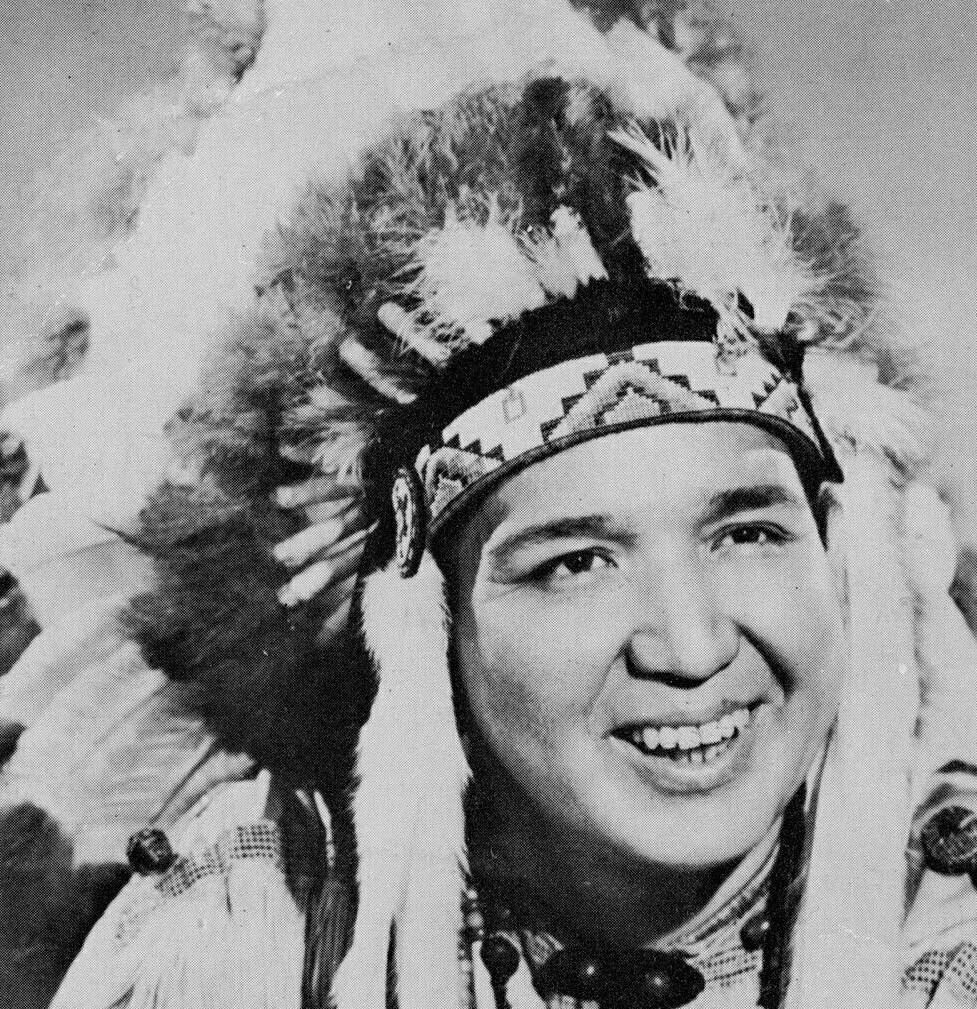
- Traynor Ora Halftown, c. 1960s
- Born: Traynor Ora Halftown; February 24, 1917; Cattaraugus Reservation
- Died: July 8, 2003 (aged 86); Brigantine, New Jersey, U.S.
- Occupation: Entertainer
- Years active: 1950–1999
- Title: Honorary chief of Seneca tribe
- Spouse: Margaret Halftown
- Children: 3

Traynor Ora Halftown (February 24, 1917 – July 5, 2003), better known as Chief Halftown, was a Native American entertainer who hosted a children's show that aired on WFIL-TV (which became WPVI-TV in 1972) in Philadelphia from 1950 to 1999. Originally intended for a six-week series, his show went on to become the world's longest running local TV children's show.

Following Halftown's death in 2003, Dave Davis, the president and general manager of Philadelphia's television station WPVI-TV6, said of Halftown:

"It would be difficult to find another local television host who connected with so many generations of children. Chief Halftown will be missed, but more importantly, he will be fondly remembered by us all."

== Formative years ==
Born on February 24, 1917, on the Cattaraugus Reservation, which is located roughly twenty-five miles south of Buffalo, New York, Halftown was a member of the Seneca Nation of New York.

== Bowling career and military service ==
During his teenage years, Halftown worked as a pinboy at a local bowling alley in Jamestown, New York. A member of the United States Army during World War II, he competed with the army's bowling team. Following his honorable discharge from the military, he briefly resumed his musical career that he had begun prior to the war when he was billed as "the Singing Seneca," but left that career behind when he began work in television.

While working as the host of a popular children's television program in Philadelphia, he also continued to pursue his love of bowling, working as a professional bowler and spokesman for the Brunswick Bowling Manufacturing Corporation. As part of this work, he became a certified bowling instructor, and launched a series of popular bowling clinics for children, each of which frequently attracted large numbers of participants. One report estimated the impact of his outreach through these clinics at 300,000 children and teenagers.

== Broadcast career ==
Halftown hosted a children's show that aired on WFIL-TV (which became WPVI-TV in 1972) in Philadelphia from 1950 to 1999.

His signature greeting was "ees da sa sussaway," which is Seneca for "Let's get started." Originally intended for a six-week series, his show went on to become the world's longest running children's program on local television. The Broadcast Pioneers of Philadelphia inducted Halftown into their Hall of Fame in 2004.

== Later years, illness and death ==
Sometime around 2001, Halftown relocated with his wife to Brigantine, New Jersey, to be closer to their children and grandchildren. Diagnosed with diabetes, Halftown died in Brigantine from complications related to the disease on July 8, 2003. The Rev. Robert J. Fritz delivered the homily at his funeral at St. Thomas' church in Brigantine.

His widow, Margaret, died in Brigantine on February 17, 2004.
