= List of Christmas and holiday season parades =

The following is a list of holiday parades that occur between Thanksgiving Day (in the U.S.) and early January, coinciding with the Christmas and holiday season.

== Africa ==
=== South Africa ===
- Cape Town: Kaapse Klopse (Cape Town Minstrel Carnival), held annually on 2 January (Second New Year)

== Asia ==
=== India ===
- Kolkata: Kolkata Christmas Festival. Parade held along Park Street in the week prior to Christmas.:)

=== Japan ===
- Osaka: Universal Studios Christmas parade. Annual parades staged in the lead up to Christmas, hosted by Universal Studios Japan
- Tokyo: Disney Christmas stories. Annual parade staged by Tokyo Disneyland.

=== Malaysia ===
- Miri: Miri Christmas Parade. Held annually since 2008.

=== Philippines ===
- Bay City, Metro Manila: The Grand Festival of Lights Parade. Annual Christmas parade staged by SM Mall of Asia, on each Saturday evening leading up to Christmas.
- San Fernando: Giant Lantern Parade. Part of the annual Giant Lantern Festival.

=== South Korea ===
- Yongin: Everland Christmas Fantasy. Various daily Christmas themed parades held at the Everland theme park, annually in November and December.

=== Thailand ===
- Sakon Nakhon: Christmas Star Procession. Held annually since 1982.

== Europe ==
=== Belgium ===
- Brussels and other Belgian cities: La Parade de Noël RTL. Annual Christmas parades held in Belgium, sponsored by television RTL-TVI and radio Bel RTL.

=== Finland ===
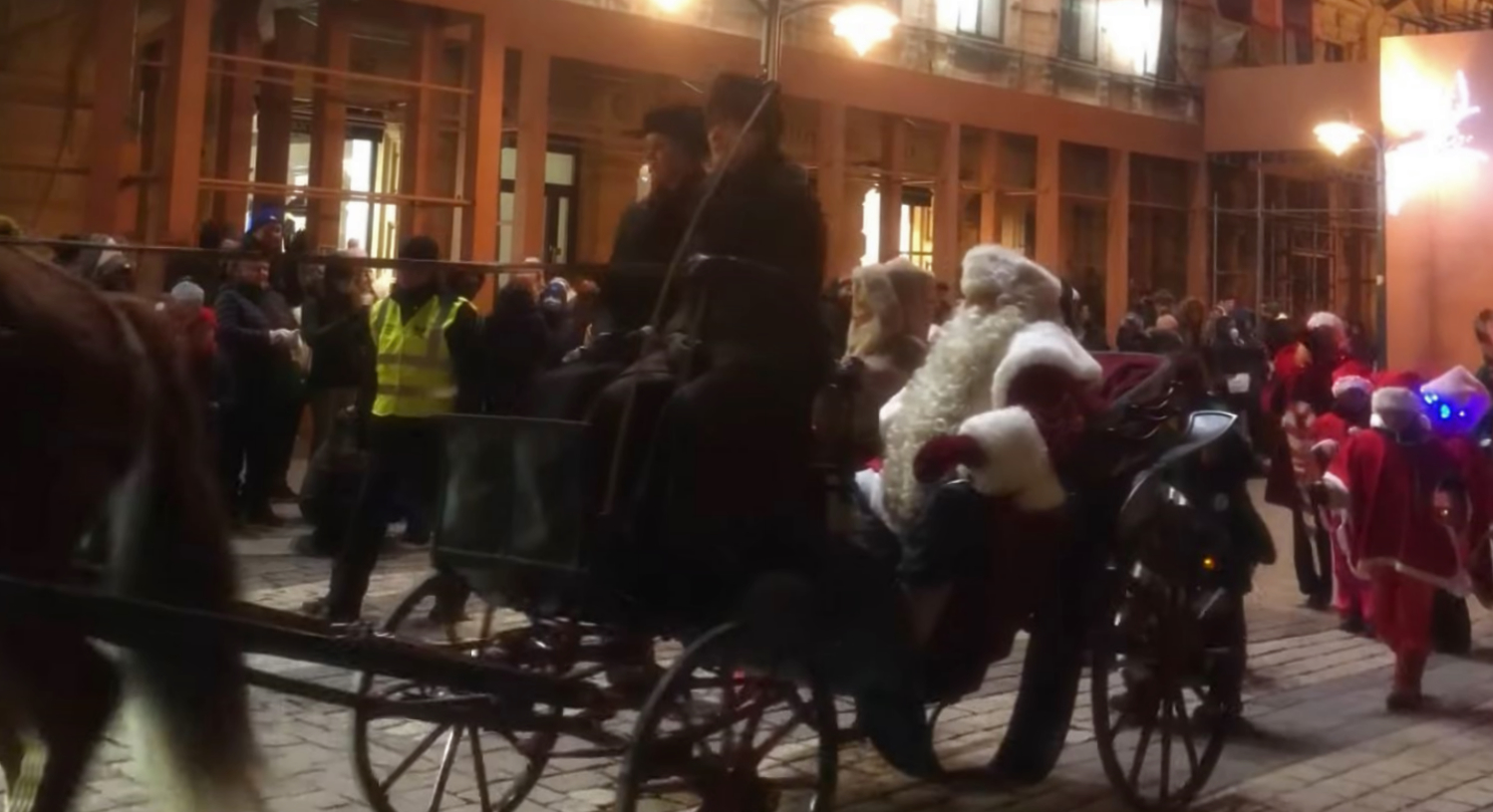
Father Christmas at the 2021 Christmas Parade in Helsinki, Finland

- Helsinki: Helsinki Christmas Parade. Held annually in late November since 1949, as part of the Opening of the Aleksanterinkatu Christmas Street festivities.

=== France ===
- Hautmont: La Parade Lumineuse magique (The Magic Luminous Parade). Held annually in December as part of the Hautmont Capitale de Noël (capital of Christmas) festivities.
- Paris: Disneyland Paris Christmas Parade

=== Germany ===
- Hamburg: Hamburger Weihnachtsparade (Hamburg Christmas parade). Held annually on all four Advent Saturdays.

=== Ireland ===
- Dingle, County Kerry: Wren's Day parades, held on 26 December, Saint Stephen's Day. (Article)

=== Netherlands ===
- Valkenburg: Valkenburg Christmas Parade

=== Spain ===
- Alcoy: Cabalgata de Reyes Magos de Alcoy (Cavalcade of Magi of Alcoy), held on the night of January 5 (night of the Three Wise Men), since the mid 19th century. (Article)
- Barcelona: Three Kings’ Parade (a Cavalcada de Reis Mags d'Orient), held 5 January, attracting crowds up to 500,000. (Article)
- Madrid: La Cabalgata de los Reyes Magos de Madrid (The Cavalcade of the Magi from Madrid). (Spanish site)

=== Sweden ===
- Stockholm: Sankta Lucia procession, held annually on 13 December since 1927.

=== United Kingdom ===
==== England ====
- Birmingham: Birmingham Christmas Parade
- Buckingham: Buckingham Christmas Parade. Held annually since 1984
- London: Hamleys Christmas Toy Parade
- London: London's New Year's Day Parade
- Penzance: Montol Festival. Procession held annually on 21 December
- Windsor: Reindeer Parade

==== Scotland ====
- Edinburgh: Torchlight Procession. Held annually on the evening of December 30, as the opening event of Edinburgh's Hogmanay festival.

== Oceania ==
=== Australia ===
==== New South Wales ====
- Gerringong: Gerringong Christmas Street Parade
- Gosford: Gosford City Christmas Parade. Held annually since the 1950s.
- Sydney: Sydney Christmas Parade

==== Queensland ====
- Brisbane: Myer Christmas Parade and Pantomime
- Bundaberg: Pageant of Lights. Held annually in early December.
- Cooroy: Christmas in Cooroy. A two-day annual event, with the street parade held on the first Saturday in December
- Gold Coast: White Christmas (Warner Bros. Movie World)
- Ipswich: Christmas Parade of Lights
- Mooloolaba: Mooloolaba Christmas Boat Parade
- Rockhampton: Rockhampton Christmas Parade

==== South Australia ====
- Adelaide: Adelaide Christmas Pageant. Established in 1933, the event is staged on the second Saturday of November and draws crowds reaching 500,000.
- Blackwood: Blackwood Christmas Pageant. Typically held first Friday in December.
- Glenelg: Glenelg Christmas Pageant. Held annually since 1954
- Mount Barker: Mount Barker Christmas Pageant. Held first Saturday in December.
- Mount Gambier: Mount Gambier Christmas Parade. First held in 1959, the event is always staged on the third Saturday of November
- Norwood: Norwood Christmas Pageant
- Port Adelaide: Twilight Christmas Parade
- Salisbury: Salisbury City Centre Christmas Parade
- Tanunda: Barossa Christmas Parade
- Whyalla: Whyalla Christmas Pageant

==== Tasmania ====
- Burnie: Burnie Christmas Parade
- George Town: George Town Annual Christmas Parade
- Hobart: Myer Hobart Christmas Pageant. Held on the third Saturday of November each year.
- Launceston: Apex Launceston Christmas Parade. Held on the first Saturday in December.
- Wynyard: Wynyard Christmas Parade

==== Victoria ====
- Geelong: Gala Day Parade. First held in 1916, to raise money for the Red Cross Society at the height of World War I.
- Melbourne: Myer Christmas Parade

==== Western Australia ====
- Albany: City of Albany Christmas Festival and Pageant
- Bunbury: City of Bunbury Christmas Carnival and Parade
- Mandurah: Mandurah Community Christmas Pageant
- Perth: Perth Christmas Pageant

=== New Zealand ===
- Auckland: Farmers Santa Parade (4th Sunday of November)
- Christchurch: Christchurch Children's Christmas Parade Trust (1st Sunday of December)
- Dunedin: Dunedin Santa Parade (1st or 2nd Sunday of December)
- Hamilton: Hamilton Christmas Parade (2nd Sunday of December)
- Palmerston North: Palmerston North Christmas Parade (2nd Sunday of December) ()
- Rotorua: Rotorua Christmas Parade (1st Saturday of December)
- Wellington: A Very Welly Christmas

== North America ==
=== Bahamas ===
- Nassau: Boxing Day Junkanoo Parade. Part of the Bahamian national festival of Junkanoo

=== Canada ===
==== Alberta ====
- Edmonton: Santa's Parade of Lights.

==== British Columbia ====
- Maple Ridge: Christmas in the Park and the Santa Claus Parade
- Nanaimo: Nanaimo's Santa Claus Parade
- Surrey: Big Rig for Kids Lighted Truck Parade
- Surrey: Surrey Santa Parade of Lights
- Vancouver: Rogers' Santa Claus Parade
- Victoria: Island Farms Santa's Light Parade
- Victoria: Truck Light Convoy and Food Drive

==== Manitoba ====
- Winnipeg: Winnipeg Santa Parade

==== New Brunswick ====
- Quispamsis and Rothesay: Kennebecasis Valley Santa Claus Parade
- Moncton, Riverview, and Dieppe: Greater Moncton Santa Claus Parade

St Andrews: Saturday Dec 6 Fredericton: Saturday Nov 29 Caraquet: Saturday Nov 15 Sussex: Saturday Dec 6 Bathurst: Sunday Dec 7

==== Newfoundland and Labrador ====
- St. John's: Downtown Christmas Parade.

==== Nova Scotia ====
- Christmas Parade of Lights- Halifax, Nova Scotia
- Halifax Christmas Parades- Halifax, Nova Scotia

==== Ontario ====
- Acton: Acton Firefighters Santa Claus Parade
- Ajax: Santa Claus Parade
- Beeton: Santa Claus Parade, route from Jackson Plaza to the Fairgrounds. (Article)
- Bowmanville: Santa Claus Parade
- Brampton: Brampton Santa Claus Parade organized by the Brampton Board of Trade, Santa's Parade at Shoppers World Brampton
- Brantford: JCI Brantford Santa Claus Parade
- Brighton: Santa Claus Parade
- Brockville: Brockville Santa Claus Parade
- Bolton (part of Caledon): Christmas Parade, organized by the Kinsmen Club
- Carleton Place: Carleton Place Santa Claus Parade
- Deseronto: Santa Claus Parade
- Elora: Santa Claus Parade
- Fergus: Fergus Santa Claus Parade
- Frankford: Santa Claus Parade
- Georgetown: Annual Santa Claus Parade
- Goderich: Santa Claus Parade, Article
- Guelph: Guelph Community Santa Claus Parade
- Grimsby: Grimsby Santa Claus Parade
- Hamilton: Hamilton Santa Claus and Grey Cup Parade
- Hespeler (Cambridge): Hespeler Santa Claus Parade (Article)
- London: London Santa Claus Parade, since 1956
- Markham: Markham Santa Claus Parade
- Mattawa: The Mattawa Santa Claus Parade
- Milton: Milton Santa Claus Parade, Heritage Parade of Lights at Country Heritage Park
- Mississauga (Streetsville): Mississauga Santa Claus Parade
- Newcastle: Newcastle Santa Parade
- North Bay: North Bay Santa Claus Parade
- Oakville: Oakville Santa Claus Parade
- Orillia: Orillia Santa Claus Parade
- Oshawa: Santa's Parade of Lights
- Ottawa: Help Santa Toy Parade
  - Ottawa (Barrhaven): Barrhaven Lions Light Up The Night Parade
  - Ottawa (Kanata): Kanata Hazeldean Mall Santa Claus Parade
  - Ottawa (Orleans): Sanata's Parade of Lights
- Pickering: Annual Kinsmen & Kinette Club Santa Claus Parade (Press release)
- Port Hope: Port Hope Santa Claus Parade
- Port Perry: Port Perry Santa Claus Parade
- Puslinch: Puslinch Santa Claus Parade
- Rockwood: Rockwood's Farmers' Santa Claus Parade of Lights
- Sault Ste. Marie: Rotary Santa Claus Parade
- Smith Falls: Smith Falls Santa Claus Parade
- Stratford: Santa's Parade of Lights
- Sturgeon Falls: The Sturgeon Falls Parade of Lights
- Timmins: Timmins Santa Claus Parade (Article)
- Toronto: Toronto Santa Claus Parade, Independent organization, formally Eaton's
  - Toronto (Etobicoke): Etobicoke Lakeshore Christmas Parade
  - Toronto (Weston): Weston Village Santa Claus Parade
  - Toronto (The Beaches): Hamper's Santa Claus Parade
- Trenton: Trenton Santa Claus Parade
- Uxbridge: Uxbridge Santa Claus Parade
- Vaughan: Vaughan Santa Claus Parade (SantaFest)
- Watford: Santa Claus Parade
- Whitby: JCI Whitby Santa Claus

==== Quebec ====
- Gatineau: Gatineau Santa Claus Parade
- Montreal: Montreal Santa Claus Parade

==== Saskatchewan ====
- Saskatoon: Saskatoon Santa Claus Parade. Originated in 1990.

==== Yukon ====
- Whitehorse: Winterval Santa Parade (Article)

=== Mexico ===
- Irapuato, Guanajuato: Three Kings Parade (Cabalgata de Reyes Magos)
- Oaxaca City: Las Calendas Christmas processions. Held on the night of December 24, concluding the Las Posadas celebrations.
- Querétaro City: Desfile de Carro Biblicos (Biblical Float Parade). Held each year on Christmas Eve since 1828.

=== United States ===
==== Alabama ====
- Montgomery: Hornet Homecoming Parade (held by Alabama State University)
- Opelika: Small scale community parade in Downtown Opelika with different schools, pageants, churches, businesses and community service operations. Held on the first Wednesday of November. Associated with "Christmas in a Railroad Town" also in Downtown Opelika.

==== Arizona ====
- Apache Junction: Holiday Program and Light Parade
- Beaver Dam: Beaver Dam Christmas Parade
- Benson: Benson Christmas Parade
- Buckeye: Glow on Monroe Electric Light Parade
- Camp Verde: Christmas Bazaar and Parade of Lights
- Carefree: Carefree Christmas Festival and Electric Light Parade
- Casa Grande: Electric Light Parade
- Chandler: Parade of Lights
- Clifton: Clifton Light Parade
- Coolidge: Christmas Light Parade
- Cottonwood: Annual Cottonwood Christmas Parade
- Duncan: Duncan Small Town Christmas Parade
- Eagar: Round Valley Christmas Light Parade
- Flagstaff: Northern Lights Holiday Parade
- Fountain Hills: Thanksgiving Day Parade aka Parada de los Cerros
- Florence: Christmas on Main Street and Holiday Light Parade
- Gila Bend: All A Glow Christmas Light Parade
- Glendale: Hometown Christmas Parade
- Globe: Christmas Light Parade
- Holbrook: Christmas Festival of Lights and Parade
- Kingman: Parade of Lights
- Lake Havasu City: Boat Parade of Lights
- Litchfield Park: Christmas in the Park Festival and Parade
- Nogales: The Light of Christmas Parade
- Page: Lake Powell Christmas Parade
- Payson: Electric Light Parade
- Peoria: Annual Santa Claus Parade
- Phoenix: APS Electric Light Parade
- Phoenix: Fiesta Bowl Parade
- Prescott: Prescott Chamber Christmas Parade
- Prescott Valley: Holiday Festival of Lights & Parade
- Quartzsite: Quartzsite Christmas Light Parade
- Queen Creek: Queen Creek Holiday Festival and Parade
- Safford: Holiday Light Parade
- Sahuarita: Winter Festival and Holiday Light Parade
- San Luis: Holiday of Lights Parade
- Show Low: Show Low Shines Christmas Parade
- Sierra Vista: Christmas Light Parade
- Somerton: Somerton Light Parade
- Springerville: Round Valley Christmas Light Parad
- Tempe: Festival of Lights Boat Parade
- Tempe: Festival of Lights Opening Night Parade
- Tolleson: Luces de Navidad aka Lights of Christmas Parade
- Tombstone: Christmas Light Parade
- Tuba City: Tuba City Christmas Light Parade
- Tucson: Parade of Lights
- Wickenburg: Annual Christmas Parade of Lights
- Willcox: Christmas Lighted Parade
- Williams: Parade of Lights
- Winslow: Annual Christmas Parade
- Yuma: Dorothy Young Memorial Electric Light Parade
- Yuma: Foothills Parade of Lights

==== California ====
- Adelanto: Adelanto Christmas Parade
- Alpine: Alpine Christmas Parade of Lights & Snow Festival
- Alturas: Alturas Winter Fest and Parade
- American Canyon: Holiday Tree Lighting & Lighted Parade
- Anaheim: A Christmas Fantasy Parade at Disneyland
- Anderson: Anderson Christmas Parade
- Angels Camp: Lighted Christmas Parade
- Antioch: Antioch Holiday Parade and Tree Lighting
- Antioch: Bridge Marina Lighted Boat Parade
- Arroyo Grande: Arroyo Grande Christmas Parade
- Arvin: Arvin Christmas Parade
- Atwater: Atwater Christmas Parade
- Auburn: Festival of Lights Parade
- Bakersfield: Bakersfield Christmas Parade
- Bass Lake: Christmas Tree Lighting and Parade of Lights
- Beaumont: Annual Christmas Light Parade
- Berkeley: Winter on the Waterfront & Lighted Boat Parade
- Bethel Island: Bethel Island San Joaquin Yacht Club Lighted Boat Parade
- Benicia: Benicia Christmas Parade & Holiday Market
- Benicia: Lighted Boat Parade
- Big Bear Lake: Snow Summit Ski Resort New Year's Eve Torchlight Parade
- Bishop: Bishop's Christmas Parade, Tree Lighting and Street of Lights
- Blythe: Blythe Christmas Parade
- Brentwood: Annual Holiday Parade
- Burlingame: Downtown Holiday Parade
- Calexico: Calexico Christmas Parade
- Calistoga: Calistoga Lighted Tractor Parade
- Camarillo: Camarillo Christmas Parade and Holiday Carnival
- Canyon Lake: Canyon Lake Christmas Boat Parade of Lights
- Carpinteria: Carpinteria Holiday Spirit Parade
- Caruthers: Caruthers Christmas Parade and Winter Fest
- Cathedral City: Snow-Fest Parade
- Chatsworth: Chatsworth Holiday Parade & Festival
- Chico: Chico Parade of Lights
- Chino: Chino Youth Christmas Parade and Fair
- Chino Hills: Chino Hills Boat Parade
- Chula Vista: Chula Vista Starlight Parade
- Clearlake: Clearlake Christmas Parade
- Clovis: Children's Electric Christmas Parade
- Coachella: Holiday Parade
- Colfax: Colfax Winterfest Parade of Lights
- Colton: Annual Christmas Parade & Christmas in the Park
- Colton: Colton & Loma Lina Fire Departments Parade of Lights
- Columbia: Columbia Christmas Equestrian Parade
- Compton: Compton Christmas Parade
- Coronado: Coronado Annual Holiday Parade
- Covina: Covina Christmas Parade and Tree Lighting
- Crescent City: Christmas Parade
- Dana Point: Dana Point Harbor Boat Parade of Lights
- Davis: Children's Candlelight Parade
- Delano: Delano Christmas Parade
- Desert Hot Springs: Sands Annual Christmas Cart Parade
- Discovery Bay: Discovery Bay Parade of Lights
- Discovery Bay: Discovery Bay Yacht Club Lighted Boat Parade
- Discovery Bay: Willow Lake Lighted Boat Parade
- Dorris: Annual Butte Valley Christmas Festival and Parade
- Downey: Downey Christmas Parade
- East Los Angeles: East Los Angeles Christmas Parade
- El Cajon: Mother Goose Parade
- El Centro: El Centro Christmas Parade
- El Segundo: El Segundo Holiday Parade
- Elk Grove: Holiday Parade of Lights
- Emeryville: Holiday Tree Lighting and Community Parade
- Encinitas: Encinitas Holiday Parade
- Escalon: Christmas on Main and Parade of Lights
- Escondido: Escondido Jaycees Christmas Parade
- Eureka: Truckers Christmas Parade
- Exeter: Exeter Christmas Parade
- Exeter: Exeter's New Year's Eve Doo-Dah Parade and Free Fireworks Show
- Fair Oaks: Christmas in the Village and Parade
- Fallbrook: Annual Christmas Parade
- Ferndale: Christmas Lighted Tractor Parade
- Folsom: Folsom Police Department and Folsom Fire Department Santa Sleigh Parade
- Fontana: Fontana Christmas Parade
- Fort Bragg: Fort Bragg's Holiday Lights Parade
- Fort Jones: Fort Jones Christmas Parade
- Fortuna: Electric Lighted Parade & Downtown Open House
- Fremont: Niles Festival of Lights Tree Lighting and Parade
- Fresno: Downtown Fresno Christmas Parade
- Galt: Lighting of the Night Parade
- Garberville: Lighted Parade
- Geyserville: Geyserville Tree Lighting and Tractor Parade
- Gilroy: Gilroy Holiday Parade, Tree Lighting and Doggie Dress-Up
- Glendale: Montrose-Glendale Christmas Parade
- Glendora: Glendora's Hometown Christmas Parade
- Granada Hills: Granada Hills Holiday Parade
- Grass Valley: Annual Donation Day Parade
- Gridley: Gridley Holiday Parade of Lights
- Grover Beach: Annual South County Holiday Parade
- Gualala: Lighted Truck Parade and Arrival of Santa Claus
- Guerneville: Holiday Parade of Lights
- Gustine: Gustine's Downtown Christmas Lighted Parade
- Half Moon Bay: Half Moon Bay Night of Lights Parade
- Hanford: Hanford Christmas Parade
- Hayfork: Hayfork Tree Lighting and Light Parade
- Hemet: Hemet Christmas Parade
- Hesperia: Hesperia Jolly Parade
- Hollister: Annual Lights On Celebration & Parade
- Hollywood/Los Angeles: Hollywood Christmas Parade
- Hughson: Hughson Christmas Festival & Parade
- Huntington Beach: Huntington Beach Light a Light of Love Parade
- Huntington Beach: Huntington Harbour Christmas Boat Parade
- Indio: Indio International Tamale Festival Parade
- Indio: Sun City Shadow Hills Christmas Golf Cart Parade
- Ione: Ione Christmas Parade and Open House
- Kelseyville: Kelseyville Christmas in the Country Parade of Lights
- Kerman: Pageantry of Lights Christmas Parade
- King City: King City Chamber of Commerce Christmas Parade
- Kingsburg: Santa Lucia Celebration and Festival of Lights Parade
- La Jolla: The Annual La Jolla Christmas Parade & Holiday Festival
- La Puente: La Puente Holiday Parade and Tree Lighting Ceremony
- Laguna Niguel: Laguna Niguel Holiday Parade
- Lake Perris: Lights on the Lake Holiday Boat Parade
- Lakeport: Lakeport Christmas Parade
- Lancaster: Lancaster Holiday Parade
- Lathrop: Lathrop Christmas Parade
- Lemoore: Lemoore Christmas Parade
- Lincoln: Lincoln Hometown Christmas Parade & Tree Lighting
- Lindsay: Lindsay Parade of Lights
- Livermore: Annual Holiday Sights & Sounds Parade and Tree Lighting
- Livingston: Lighted Christmas Parade and Gift Fair
- Lodi: Lodi Parade of Lights
- Loma Linda: Colton & Loma Lina Fire Departments Parade of Lights
- Lompoc: Lompoc Children's Christmas Season Parade
- Lone Pine: Lone Pine Christmas Parade
- London: London Christmas Parade
- Belmont Shore, Long Beach: Belmont Shore Christmas Parade
- Long Beach: Long Beach Christmas Boat Parade of 1,000 Lights
- Long Beach: Naples Island Annual Holiday Boat Parade
- Loomis: Loomis Day Before Thanksgiving Parade
- Los Altos: Los Altos Festival of Lights Parade
- Los Angeles: Holiday Parade of Boats
- Los Banos: Downtown Christmas Parade
- Los Gatos: Annual Los Gatos Children's Christmas & Holidays Parade of Boats
- Los Osos: Annual Christmas Parade
- Madera: Madera Candlelight Christmas Parade
- Malibu: Annual Malibu Christmas Woodie Parade at Malibu Village
- Mammoth Lakes: Mammoth Mountain New Year's Eve Torchlight Parade
- Manteca: Manteca Holiday Parade
- Mariposa: Merry Mountain Christmas Parade
- Marina del rey: Marina Del Rey Snow Wonder and Holiday Boat Parade
- Martinez: Holiday Light Parade
- Marysville: Marysville Christmas Parade
- Mecca: Desfile de Luces
- Merced: Merced Christmas Parade
- Mission Viejo/Lake Mission Viejo: Lake Mission Viejo Boat Parade
- Modesto: Celebration of Lights Parade
- Monrovia: Monrovia Tree Lighting Ceremony & Holiday Parade
- Monterey: Annual Parade of Lights
- Monterey: Harbor Lighted Boat Parade
- Montrose: Montrose-Glendale Christmas Parade
- Morro Bay: Caroling Cop Cars and Christmas Trolley Parade
- Morro Bay: Morro Bay Christmas Boat Parade
- Mount Shasta: Winter Magic Festival & Holiday Hometown Light Parade
- Mountain View: Menorah Parade
- Murphys: Murphys Open House Parade
- Murrieta: Holiday Magic Parade
- Newport Beach: Newport Beach Christmas Boat Parade & Ring of Lights
- Needles: Needles Holiday Fun Fair Lighted Christmas Parade
- Napa: Napa's Christmas Parade
- Norco: Annual Horsetown Parade of Lights
- North Fork: North Fork Christmas Parade
- Oakland: Comcast Oakland Holiday Parade – America's Children's Parade
- Oakland: Oakland Lighted Yacht Parade
- Ocean Beach: Ocean Beach Holiday Parade
- Oceanside: Oceanside Parade of Lights Boat Parade
- Oildale: North of the River Christmas Parade
- Ontario: Christmas on Euclid Menorah Parade
- Orcutt: Old Town Orcutt Christmas Parade
- Oroville: Oroville Parade of Lights
- Oxnard: Oxnard Boat Parade of Lights
- Oxnard: Oxnard Christmas Parade
- Pacific Grove: Annual Parade of Lights
- Pacoima: Pacoima Christmas Parade
- Palm Springs: Palm Springs Festival of Lights Parade
- Palmdale: Palmdale Christmas Parade
- Palo Alto: Menorah Parade
- Paradise: Christmas Lighted Truck Parade
- Parlier: Parlier Christmas Tree Lighting and Parade
- Pasadena: Pasadena Doo Dah Parade
- Pasadena: Rose Parade
- Paso Robles: Annual Christmas Light Parade
- Penngrove: Holiday Parade of Light
- Perris: Perris Christmas Parade
- Petaluma: Petaluma Holiday Lighted Boat Parade
- Pittsburg: Pittsburg Christmas Parade
- Placerville: Placerville Hangtown Christmas Parade
- Pleasanton: Chanukah Parade & Menorah Lighting
- Pleasanton: Hometown Holiday Parade
- Pomona: Pomona Christmas Parade
- Porterville: Children's Christmas Parade
- Quincy: Main Street Sparkle Reindog Parade and Light Parade
- Rancho Cordova: Rancho Cordova Holiday Light Parade
- Rancho Cucamonga: The Ho Ho Parade in Ranch Cucamonga
- Red Bluff: Red Bluff Christmas Parade
- Redding: Redding Lighted Christmas Parade
- Redlands: Redlands Christmas Parade
- Redondo Beach: King Harbor Yacht Club's Annual Holiday Boat Parade
- Redondo Beach: Riviera Village Holiday Stroll Parade
- Redondo Beach: Santa Float Parade
- Redwood City: Hometown Holidays Parade
- Reedley: Reedley Electrical Farm Equipment Christmas Parade
- Rialto: Rialto Holiday Parade and Vendor Fair
- Ridgecrest: Ridgecrest Children's Christmas Parade
- Rio Linda: Rio Linda Elverta Christmas Light Parade
- Riverbank: Riverbank Christmas Festival & Parade
- Ripon: Ripon Christmas Parade
- Rolling Hills Estates: Annual Palos Verdes Peninsula Holiday Parade
- Roseville: Annual Sylvia Besana Holiday Parade
- Sacramento: Capital City Yacht Club's Lighted Boat Parade
- Sacramento: Sacramento Santa Parade
- Salinas: Salinas Holiday Parade of Lights
- San Bernardino: Annual Community Ho Ho Parade
- San Bernardino: Winter Wonderland and Christmas Parade
- Gaslamp Quarter, San Diego: Gaslamp Holiday Pet Parade
- Mission Bay, San Diego: Mission Bay Christmas Boat Parade
- San Diego: North Park Toyland Parade and Festival
- San Diego: Port of San Diego Holiday Bowl Parade
- Ocean Beach, San Diego: Ocean Beach Holiday Parade
- San Diego: San Diego Bay Parade of Lights
- San Francisco: Fisherman's Wharf Holiday Lights & Sights Boat Parade
- San Francisco: Parol Lantern Festival and Parade
- San Juan Bautista: San Juan Bautista Holiday of Lights Celebration & Parade
- San Jose: San Jose Holiday Parade
- San Luis Obispo: San Luis Obispo Holiday Parade
- San Marcos: Kiwanis San Marcos Holiday Parade
- San Pedro: San Pedro Holiday Parade
- San Rafael: San Rafael Lighted Boat Parade
- San Rafael: San Rafael Parade of Lights and Winter Wonderland
- Sanger: Annual Nation's Christmas Tree City Toyland Parade
- Santa Barbara: Downtown Holiday Parade
- Santa Barbara: Santa Barbara Parade of Lights
- Santa Cruz: Santa Cruz Holiday Parade
- Santa Cruz: Santa Cruz Yacht Club Harbor Boat Parade
- Santa Maria: Santa Maria Parade of Lights
- Sausalito: Sausalito Lighted Boat Parade & Fireworks
- Seal Beach: Seal Beach Christmas Parade
- Solvang: Solvang Julefest Parade
- Sonora: Annual Downtown Sonora Christmas Parade
- South Gate: South Gate Christmas Parade
- Squaw Valley: Squaw Valley New Year's Eve Torchlight Parade
- Stockton: Lynn Hahn Memorial Delta Reflections Lighted Boat Parade
- Suisun City: Christmas at the Waterfront Lighted Boat Parade
- Sunnyvale: Lakewood Village Holiday Parade
- Susanville: Annual Magical Country Christmas Celebration & Parade
- Sutter Creek: Sutter Creek Parade of Lights
- Taft: Annual Taft Christmas Parade
- Tahoe City: Granlibakken's Annual Torchlight Parade
- Tehachapi: Tehachapi Christmas Parade & Tree Lighting
- Temecula: Santa's Electric Light Parade
- Temple City: Lights on Temple City Parade and Tree Lighting
- Tracy: Downtown Tracy Holiday Parade & Tree Lighting
- Tulare: Tulare Children's Christmas Parade
- Turlock: Turlock Christmas Parade
- Twain Harte: Winter Wonderland Parade
- Ukiah: Ukiah Parade of Lights
- Upland: Annual Upland Christmas Parade & Holiday Faire
- Upper Lake: Upper Lake Holiday Parade
- Vacaville: Menorah on Main – Menorah Lighting & Community Chanukah Celebration & Parade
- Vallejo: Vallejo Lighted Boat Parade
- Vallejo: Mad Hatter Holiday Festival and Parade
- Valley Springs: Valley Springs Christmas Parade
- Venice: Venice Christmas Boat Parade
- Ventura: Ventura Harbor Parade of Lights
- Victorville: Victorville Christmas Parade
- Villa Park: Villa Park Dry Land Boat Parade
- Visalia: Visalia Annual Candy Cane Lane Parade
- Vista: Visata Christmas Parade
- Walnut Creek: Broadway Plaza's Annual Holiday Parade of Lights, Retailer Open House & Tree Lighting
- Weed: Olde Fashioned Christmas Parade and Tree Lighting Ceremony
- Westwood: Christmas in the Mountains Light Parade
- White Pines: White Pines Parade of Lights
- Whittier: Uptown Christmas Parade
- Wilmington: Heart of the Harbor Holiday Parade
- Winters: Tractor Parade & Tree Lighting
- Woodlake: Woodlake Christmas Parade
- Woodland: Woodlake Holiday Parade
- Wrightwood: Mountain High Resort New Year's Eve Torchlight Parade
- Yreka: Candy Cane Stripes and Christmas Lights Holiday Parade
- Yuba City: Yuba City Holiday Parade

==== Connecticut ====
- Stamford: UBS Parade Spectacular (held the Sunday before Thanksgiving to not directly compete with the Macy's Thanksgiving Day Parade 30 miles away)

==== Colorado ====
- Denver: Parade of Lights
- Mount Crested Butte: Annual Crested Butte Mountain Resort Torchlight Parade

==== Delaware ====
- Seaford: Parade Spectacular Event. It is held the first Saturday of December.

==== Florida ====
- Alachua: Alachua Annual Christmas Parade
- Altha: Alatha Christmas Parade & Celebration
- Amelia Island: Lighted Christmas Parade
- Apollo Beach: Apollo Beach Christmas Golf Cart Parade
- Apollo Beach: Apollo Beach Lighted Boat Parade
- Apopka: Apopka Christmas Parade
- Astor: Annual Lighted Parade of Boats (Santa's Workshop)
- Auburndale: Havendale Christmas Parade
- Avon Park: Avon Park Christmas Parade
- Barefoot Bay: Bayfoot Bay Christmas Parade
- Bartow: Christmas Golf Cart Parade
- Bartow: Downtown Bartow Christmas Parade
- Belleview: Belleview Christmas Parade
- Beverly Hills: Christmas in the Hills Parade
- Boca Raton: Boca Raton Boat Parade
- Bonita Springs: Bonita Springs Christmas Boat Parade
- Bowling Green: Bowling Green Christmas Parade
- Boynton Beach: Boynton/Delray Holiday Boat Parade
- Bradenton: Annual Christmas Golf Cart Parade
- Bradenton: Christmas on the Braden River
- Callahan: Callahan Christmas Parade
- Cape Coral: Cape Coral Christmas Boat Parade
- Captiva Island: Captiva Holiday Village Golf Cart Parade
- Carabelle: Holiday on the Harbor Boat Parade of Lights
- Casselberry: Lake Howell Boat Parade
- Cedar Key: Cedar Key Christmas Boat Parade aka A Cedar Key Christmas
- Chipley: Chipley Christmas Fest Parade
- Christmas: Wedgefield HOA Christmas Golf Cart Parade
- Citrus Springs: Citrus Springs Christmas Parade
- Clearwater: Clearwater Holiday Lighted Boat Parade
- Clearwater: Island Estates Yacht Club Boat Parade
- Clermont: Johns Lake Boat Parade
- Cocoa Beach: Cocoa Beach Christmas Boat Parade
- Coral Gables: Junior Orange Bowl Parade
- Crestview: Crestview Christmas Parade
- Crystal River: Crystal River Christmas Parade
- Crystal River: Crystal River Community Holiday Boat Parade
- Dade City: Annual Magical Night Christmas Parade
- Davenport: Davenport Winterfest and Parade
- Daytona Beach: Daytona Beach Christmas Boat Parade
- Daytona Beach Shores: Shores Christmas Parade
- DeBary: DeBary Christmas Parade
- DeFuniak Springs: DeFuniak Springs Christmas Parade
- DeLand: DeLand Christmas Boat Parade
- DeLand: Downtown DeLand Christmas Parade
- Deltona: Deltona Christmas Parade
- Destin: Destin Christmas Parade
- Destin: Holiday on the Harbor Destin Lighted Boat Parade
- Dundee: Dundee Christmas Parade
- Dunedin: Dunedin Holiday Boat Parade
- Eastpoint: Eastpoint Christmas Celebration & Parade
- Edgewater: Edgewater Christmas Parade
- Fanning Springs: Festival of Lights and Boat Parade
- Fernandina Beach: Lighted Christmas Parade
- Fleming Island: Whitey's Fish Camp Lighted Boat Parade
- Fort Lauderdale: Chanukah Car Menorah Parade
- Fort Lauderdale: Seminole Hard Rock Winterfest Boat Parade
- Fort Meade: Old Fort Meade Christmas Festival and Parade
- Fort Myers: Fort Myers Beach Christmas Boat Parade
- Fort Pierce: Lighted Boat Parade and Paddleboard/Kayak Parade of Lights
- Fort Walton Beach: Fort Walton Beach Christmas Parade
- Freeport: Freeport Christmas Parade
- Gibsonton: Annual Alafia Lighted Boat Parade
- Grand Ridge: Grand Ridge Christmas Parade
- Groveland: Annual Groveland Christmas Parade
- Gulf Breeze: Gulf Breeze Christmas Parade
- Gulfport: Annual Gulfport & Boca Ciega Yacht Club Lighted Christmas Boat Parade
- Haines City: Haines City's Glitter, Glisten & Snow
- Hastings: Hastings Annual Christmas Parade
- Hawthorne: Hawthorne Annual Christmas Parade & Festival
- Hernando Beach: Boat Parade
- High Springs: Annual Twilight Christmas Parade
- Hobe Sound: Hobe Sound Christmas Parade
- Holly Hill: Holly Hill Christmas Parade
- Hollywood: Candy Cane Parade
- Holmes Beach: Privateers Christmas Parade and Santa Open House
- Homosassa: Holiday Boat Parade
- Indian Rocks Beach: Indian Rocks Beach Holiday Lighted Boat Parade
- Indian Rocks Beach: Indian Rocks Beach Holiday Street Parade
- Indian Shores: Redington Beach and Indian Shores Holiday Boat Parade
- Inverness: Citrus County Airboat Alliance Parade
- Inverness: Citrus County Christmas Parade
- Jacksonville: Jacksonville Light Parade
- Jacksonville: Julington Creek Holiday Light Parade aka Holiday on the Creek
- Jasper: Sweets N the Streets Christmas Festival and Parade
- Jay: Jay Christmas Parade
- Jupiter: Jupiter Boat Parade and Celebration
- Jupiter: Jupiter Tequesta Athletic Association Holiday Parade
- Key Colony Beach: Key Colony Beach Christmas Boat Parade
- Key Largo: Key Largo Boat Parade
- Key West: Hometown Holiday Parade
- Key West: Schooner Wharf Bar/Absolut Vodka Lighted Boat Parade
- Keystone Heights: Keystone Heights Christmas Parade
- Kissimmee: Kissimmee Festival of Lights Parade
- Lady Lake: Lady Lake Christmas Parade
- Lake Alfred: Lake Alfred Christmas Parade
- Lake City: Lake City Rotary Christmas Parade
- Lake Wales: Lake Wales Christmas Parade
- Lakeland: Christmas Parade
- Lakeport: Lakeport Christmas Boat Parade
- Lantana: Annual Lake Osborne Holiday Boat Parade
- Leesburg: Leesburg Christmas Parade
- Leesburg: Leesburg's Christmas on the Water aka Toys for Tots Lighted Holiday Boat Parade
- Leesburg: The Villages Christmas Parade
- Little Havana: Parada de los Reyes Mago (Three Kings Parade), held annually since 1971
- Longwood: Longwood Christmas Parade
- Lower Keys: Lower Keys Lighted Boat Parade
- Madeira Beach: Festival of Lights Boat Parade
- Marathon: Boot Key Harbor Lighted Christmas Parade
- Marianna: Main Street Christmas Parade
- Marco Island: Marco Island Christmas Island Style Boat Parade
- Matlacha: Christmas Boat Parade
- Melbourne: Melbourne Light Parade
- Melbourne Beach: Annual Children's Christmas Parade
- Melrose: Merry Melrose Parade and Arts and Crafts Festival
- Merritt Island: Merritt Island Christmas Boat Parade
- Merritt Island: Merritt Island Holiday Parade
- Miami: Miami Outboard Club Holiday Boat Parade
- Mount Dora: Christmas Parade
- Mount Dora: Christmas Lighted Boat Parade
- Milton: Blackwater Pyrates Christmas Boat Parade aka Christmas on the River
- Mulberry: Mulberry's Christmas Parade
- Naples: Naples Christmas Boat Parade on Naples Bay
- Naples: Naples Christmas Parade
- Naples: The Village at Venetian Bay Boat Parade
- New Port Richey: Cotee River Christmas Boat Parade
- New Smyrna Beach: Annual Christmas Parade
- New Smyrna Beach: Annual Holiday Boat Parade
- Newberry: Newberry Christmas Parade
- Niceville: Bluewater Christmas Boat Parade
- Niceville: Boggy Bayou Holiday Boat Parade
- Niceville: Niceville Christmas Parade
- North Fort Myers: North Fort Myers Christmas Parade
- North Miami: North Miami Thanksgiving Parade
- Oak Hill: Oak Hill Christmas Parade
- Ocala: Christmas Golf Cart Parade
- Ocala: Ocala/Marion County Christmas Parade
- Ocoee: Ocoee Christmas Parade
- Okeechobee: Christmas Boat Parade
- Okeechobee: Top of the Lake Christmas Festival and Parade
- Orange City: Christmas Light Up Village and Parade
- Orlando: Chanukah Parade & Celebration
- Orlando: Florida Citrus Parade
- Orlando: Orlando Christmas Parade
- Orlando: Winter Spark in Baldwin Park – Christmas Parade
- Ozona: Christmas Golf Cart Parade
- Palm Bay: Palm Bay Hospital Holiday Light Parade
- Palm Beach: Jupiter Boat Parade and Celebration
- Palm City: Meridian Marina's Martin County Christmas Boat Parade
- Palm Coast: Christmas Boat Parade
- Palm Valley: Palm Valley Boat Parade
- Palmetto: Manatee River Holiday Boat Parade
- Panama City: Panama City Christmas Boat Parade
- Panama City: Panama City Christmas Parade
- Panama City: Pier Park Christmas Parade
- Pensacola: Pensacola Elf Parade
- Pensacola: Lighted Boat Parade
- Pinellas Park: Pinellas Park Christmas Parade
- Placida: Gasparilla Marina Christmas Boat Parade
- Plant City: Plant City Christmas Parade
- Poinciana: Christmas Parade & Celebration
- Pompano Beach: Holiday Boat Parade
- Polk City: Polk City Christmas Parade
- Port Orange: Port Orange Christmas Parade
- Punta Gorda: Charlotte County Chamber of Commerce's Annual Christmas Parade
- Punta Gorda: The Annual Saturday Night Before Christmas Eve Boat Parade
- Redington Beach: Redington Beach and Indian Shores Holiday Boat Parade
- Safety Harbor: Safety Harbor Holiday Parade
- St. Augustine: Holiday Regatta of Lights
- St. Augustine: St. Augustine Annual Christmas Parade
- St. Cloud: St. Cloud Annual Christmas Parade
- St. James City: Pine Island Lighted Christmas Boat Parade
- St. Pete Beach: Pass-a-Grille/Vina Del Mar Parade
- St. Pete Beach: Christmas Market and Parade
- St. Pete Beach: St. Pete Beach & South Pasadena Holiday Lighted Boat Parade
- St. Pete Beach: St. Pete Beach Boat Parade and Winter Festival in the Park
- St. Petersburg: St. Petersburg's Illuminated Boat Parade
- Sanford: Sanford Muddy Waters ATV Assn. Christmas Parade
- Sanford: Sanford's Annual Illuminated Christmas Parade
- Sanford: Sanford's Illuminated Holiday Boat Parade
- Sarasota: Sarasota Holiday Boat Parade of Lights
- Satellite Beach: Grand Canal Holiday Boat Parade
- Sebastian: Sebastian Christmas Parade
- Sebring: Sebring Christmas Parade
- South Pasadena: St. Pete Beach & South Pasadena Holiday Lighted Boat Parade
- Spring Hill: Weeki Wachee River Lighted Boat Parade
- Steinhatchee: Boat Parade
- Stuart: Stuart Christmas Boat Parade
- Stuart: Stuart Christmas Parade
- Tallahassee: Tallahassee Winter Festival & Parade
- Tampa: Hillsborough River Holiday Boat Parade
- Tampa: Outback Bowl New Year's Eve Parade
- Tampa: SantaFest & Christmas Parade
- Tarpon Springs: Annual Tarpon Springs Boat Parade
- Tarpon Springs: Tarpon Springs Christmas Parade
- Titusville: Mims Christmas Parade
- Titusville: Titusville Holiday Boat Parade
- Treasure Island: Treasure Island's Lighted Boat Parade
- Umatilla: Cracker Christmas Parade and Festival
- Venice: Venice Christmas Boat Parade
- Venice: Venice Holiday Parade
- Vero Beach: Christmas Boat Parade
- Vero Beach: Vero Beach Christmas Parade
- Walt Disney World (Magic Kingdom): Disney Parks Christmas Day Parade, previously the "Walt Disney World Very Merry Christmas Parade" and the "Walt Disney World Christmas Day Parade"
- Wauchula: Christmas Parade
- Webster: Webster Christmas Parade
- Welaka: Welaka Christmas Boat Parade
- Wellington: Wellington Holiday Parade
- Williston: Light Up Williston Christmas Parade
- Windermere: Windermere Christmas Golf Cart Parade
- Winter Garden: Johns Lake Boat Parade
- Winter Garden: Winter Garden Christmas Golf Cart Parade
- Winter Haven: Havendale Christmas Parade
- Winter Haven: Light Up The Lakes Christmas Boat Parade
- Winter Park: Winter Park Boat Parade and Festival of Lights
- Winter Park: Winter Park Christmas Parade
- Winter Springs: Winter Wonderland Holiday Parade
- Zephyrhills: Main Street Zephyrhills Festival of Lights Christmas Parade

==== Georgia ====
- Atlanta: Peach Bowl Parade around New Year's Day
- Atlanta: Children's Christmas Parade, first Saturday in December (second after Thanksgiving)
- Bainbridge: Boat Parade of Lights
- Bainbridge: Bainbridge Christmas Parade
- Rome: Rome Christmas Parade
- Valdosta: Valdosta Christmas Parade

==== Hawaii ====
- Waikiki: Waikiki Holiday Parade

==== Illinois ====
- Bradley: Bradley Christmas Fantasy Parade
- Chicago: State Street Thanksgiving Day Parade/McDonald's Thanksgiving Parade
- Chicago: Magnificent Mile Lights Festival Tree-Lighting Parade
- Granite City, Illinois Santa's Holiday Avenue Parade Every year on the Saturday before Thanksgiving.
- Havana: Christmas Parade
- O'Fallon: Illuminated Christmas Parade
- Peoria: Santa Claus Parade
- St. Charles: St. Charles Holiday Homecoming and Electric Christmas Parade
- Streator: Annual Santa Claus Parade

==== Indiana ====
- Noblesville: Christmas parade

==== Iowa ====
- Anamosa: Festival of Lights Parade
- Atlantic: Christmas in Atlantic Lighted Parade
- Belle Plaine: Belle Plaine Old Fashioned Lighted Christmas Parade
- Belmond: Parade of Lights
- Boone: Holiday Lighted Parade
- Burlington: Burlington Lighted Holiday Parade
- Cantril: Lighted Christmas Parade and Soup Supper
- Cedar Rapids: Holiday DeLight Parade
- Chariton: Dazzle Fest Lighted Parade
- Charles City: Holiday Lighted Parade
- Cherokee: Lighted Christmas Parade
- Clarinda: Clarinda Christmas Parade
- Clear Lake: Christmas by the Lake Lighted Parade
- Corning: Light Up The Night Lighted Parade
- Cresco: Santa Holiday Parade
- Creston: No Place Like Creston for the Holidays Celebration
- Davenport: Quad City Arts Festival of Trees Holiday Parade
- Decorah: Decorah Hometown Holidays Lighted Holiday Parade
- DeWitt: DeWitt's Hometown Christmas Parade
- Ely: Lighted Winterfest Parade
- Estherville: The Chocolate Walk and Parade of Lights
- Fairfield: Fairfield Rotary Christmas Parade
- Forest City: Forest City Christmas Parade
- Fort Madison: Fort Madison Parade of Lights
- Greenfield: Festival of Lights Parade
- Humboldt: Lighted Christmas Parade
- Indianola: Holiday Extravaganza and Parade
- Lake City: Christmas Festival Parade
- Lamoni: Christmas Parade
- Le Mars: Le Mars Lighted Christmas Parade
- Madrid: Christmas Extravaganza & Parade
- Manchester: Window Walk and Static Christmas Parade
- Marshalltown: Holiday Stroll Lighted Parade
- Menlo: Menlo Christmas Parade
- Milo: Milo's Small Town Country Christmas Lighted Parade
- Monona: Lighted Holiday Parade & Festival
- Newton: Jasper County Courthouse Lighting and Lighted Christmas Parade
- Northwood: Christmas in Northwood Lighted Parade
- Ogden: Lighted Christmas Parade
- Osage: Christmas on Market Street Parade
- Oskaloosa: Main Street Lighted Christmas Parade
- Pella: Sinterklaas Arrives in Pella
- Perry: Lighted Christmas Parade
- Sac City: Sac City Christmas Parade
- Sibley: Sibley Christmas Parade
- Sioux City: Downtown Holiday Parade
- Storm Lake: Miracle on Lake Avenue Lighted Holiday Parade
- Swisher: Lighted Christmas Parade
- Tama: Christmas Parade
- Toledo: Christmas Parade
- Traer: Traer Lighted Parade
- Vinton: Vinton Christmas Parade
- Washington: Downtown Lighting Ceremony & Lighted Parade
- Webster City: Lighted Parade
- Williams: Lighted Christmas Parade
- Wilton: Wilton Christmas Parade

==== Kentucky ====
- Owensboro: Owensboro-Daviess County Christmas Parade – Where Kentucky Starts Christmas

==== Louisiana ====
- New Orleans: Bayou Classic Thanksgiving Day Parade

==== Maryland ====
- Hampden, Baltimore: The Mayor's Annual Christmas Parade
- Cambridge: Cambridge-Dorchester County Christmas Parade
- Westminster: "Miracle on Main Street Holiday Electric Parade"

==== Massachusetts ====
- North Attleborough: The Downtown Associates of North Attleborough (DANA) Annual Santa Claus Parade North Attleborough Santa Parade
- Plymouth: America's Hometown Thanksgiving Parade

==== Michigan ====
- Blissfield: Holiday Parade
- Chelsea: Chelsea Hometown Holidays and Light Parade
- Coopersville: Annual Nighttime Christmas Parade
- Detroit: America's Thanksgiving Parade
- Garden City: Downtown Garden City Santaland Parade
- Lansing: Silver Bells in the City
- Marlette: Marlette Country Christmas Parade
- Marshall: Annual Holiday Parade
- Midland: Midland Santa Parade
- Mount Clemens: Mount Clemens Santa Parade
- Northville: Holiday Lighted Parade
- Rochester: Rochester Hometown Christmas Parade
- Saline: Saline's Annual Holiday Parade

==== Minnesota ====
- Minneapolis: The Minneapolis Holidazzle Parade/Target Holidazzle Parade multiple nights at the Nicollet Mall

==== Mississippi ====
- Greenwood Roy Martin Delta Band Festival Holiday parade is held each year on the first Friday of December followed by fireworks over the Yazoo River

==== Missouri ====
- Jefferson City: The Jefferson City Christmas Parade
- Kansas City: The Holiday Promenade of Stars Parade
- Kearney: Magical Night Lighted Parade
- St. Louis: Ameren St. Louis Thanksgiving Day Parade

==== Nevada ====
- Battle Mountain: Battle Mountain Parade of Lights
- Boulder City: Boulder City Christmas Parade
- Carson City: Carson City Parade of Lights
- Elko: Snowflake Festival & Parade of Lights
- Ely: Ely Christmas Parade
- Fernley: Fernley Christmas Extravaganza and Parade
- Gardnerville: Annual Parade of Lights
- Hawthorne: Annual Parade of Lights
- Henderson: WinterFest Evening Light Parade
- Las Vegas: Downtown Summerlin Holiday Parade
- Las Vegas: Menorah Car Chanukah Parade
- Lovelock: Lovelock Parade of Lights
- Mesquite: Annual Christmas Parade of Lights
- Minden: Annual Parade of Lights
- Reno: Mount Rose Ski Tahoe Falcons New Year's Eve Torchlight Parade
- Reno: Annual Hidden Valley Parade of Lights
- Sparks: Annual Hometowne Christmas Celebration and Parade
- Virginia City: Christmas on the Comstock Parade
- West Wendover: Light Up the Sky Holiday Parade
- Winnemucca: Christmas Parade of Lights
- Yerington: Yerington Christmas Parade

==== New Jersey ====
- Bridgeton: Greater Bridgeton Area Holiday Parade, organized by the Bridgeton Main Street Association
- Burlington: at Burlington Center Mall
- Cherry Hill: at Cherry Hill Mall
- Jersey City: Santa's Arrival Parade at the Newport Centre Mall. (Article)
- Raritan: John Basilone parade
- Stone Harbor: Stone Harbor Christmas Parade
- Voorhees Township: Parade is part of the Tree Lighting Ceremony at Voorhees Town Center.
- Westwood: Westwood Holiday Parade ()
- Woodbridge: Woodbridge Township Holiday Parade (Press release), Annual Santa Arrival Parade in Woodbridge Center mall

==== New Mexico ====
- Albuquerque: Twinkle Light Parade

==== New York ====
- Clayton: Clayton Christmas Parade
- Frewsburg: Frewsburg Old Fashioned Santa Parade (held Saturday after Thanksgiving)
- Jamestown: Wide World of Christmas Parade
- New York City: Macy's Thanksgiving Day Parade
- Olean: Santa Claus Lane Parade
- Schenectady Holiday Parade
- Watertown: Holiday Parade

==== North Carolina ====
- Chapel Hill: Chapel Hill Arts Parade
- Charlotte: Novant Health Thanksgiving Day Parade
- Burgaw: Burgaw Annual Christmas Parade
- Greensboro: Greensboro Jaycees Christmas Parade
- Raleigh: Raleigh Christmas Parade

==== North Dakota ====
- Fargo-Moorhead: "Xcel Energy Holiday Lights Parade"

==== Ohio ====
- Cambridge: "A Dickens of a Christmas" Holiday Parade
- Carroll: "Carroll Old Timers Festival Aug 21–23 Parade on Aug. 23"
- Fairborn: Christmas Parade
- Gahanna: Lighted Nighttime Parade
- Granville: Christmas Parade
- Greenville: Hometown Holiday Parade
- Lancaster: Old-Fashioned Christmas Parade
- Lebanon: Horse-drawn Carriage Parade
- Marion: Christmas Parade
- Shandon: Christmas in the Country Parade
- Steubenville: Downtown Christmas Parade
- Toledo: Downtown Holiday Parade
- Waverly: Jingle Bell Parade Weekend

==== Oklahoma ====
- Ada: Christmas Parade ()
- Tulsa: Tulsa Christmas Parade. Held annually since 1926.
- Waurika: Christmas Parade () (Second weekend in December)

==== Oregon ====
- Bend: Bend Christmas Parade
- Pendleton: Pendleton Christmas Carriage Parade
- Portland: Macy's Holiday Parade
- Portland: Christmas Ship Parade

==== Pennsylvania ====
- Bradford: Cruisin' into Christmas Parade
- North Wales: Santa Arrival Parade at Montgomery Mall
- Philadelphia: 6abc Dunkin' Thanksgiving Day Parade
- Philadelphia: Mummers Parade on New Year's Day
- Pittsburgh: Celebrate the Season Parade
- Scranton: Greater Scranton Jaycees Santa Parade
- State College: Penn State Homecoming Parade
- West Chester: QVC West Chester Christmas Parade

==== South Carolina ====
- Boykin: Boykin Christmas Parade (Sunday before Christmas)
- Camden: Kershaw County Christmas Parade (Second Saturday in December)
- Columbia: (First week in December)
- Elgin: Elgin Catfish Stomp (First Saturday in December)
- Greenville: Poinsettia Christmas Parade (Early December)
- Lugoff: (Week after Elgin Catfish Stomp)
- Rock Hill: (First week in December)

==== South Dakota ====
- Rapid City: Christmas Light Parade (Two Saturday's after Thanksgiving)

==== Tennessee ====
- Donelson: Annual Donelson-Hermitage Chamber of Commerce Christmas Parade
- Gatlinburg: Fantasy of Lights Christmas Parade
- Nashville: Annual Nashville Gas Christmas Parade
- Parrottsville: Annual Parrottsville Christmas Parade

==== Texas ====
- Dallas: Comerica Bank New Year's Parade
- Dallas: Children's Health Holiday Parade
- El Paso: First Light Federal Credit Union Sun Bowl Parade. Note: Contrary to the Sun Bowl often being played on New Year's Eve, the associated parade is actually held on Thanksgiving.
- Houston: H-E-B Thanksgiving Day Parade
- Nacogdoches: Nine Flags Christmas Parade
- San Antonio: Ford Holiday River Parade

==== Virginia ====
- Chesapeake: Christmas Tree Lighting and Parade
- Leesburg: Annual Christmas and Holiday Parade
- Norfolk: Grand Illumination Parade
- Purcellville: Christmas Parade
- Richmond: Dominion Christmas Parade
- Virginia Beach: Light Up the Town

==== Washington ====
- Lewis County: Centralia Lighted Tractor Parade
- Seattle: Macy's Parade (not to be confused with the Macy's Thanksgiving Day Parade in New York City)

==== West Virginia ====
- Wheeling: Perkins Restaurant & Bakery Fantasy in Lights Parade

==== Wisconsin ====
- Appleton: The Annual Downtown Appleton Christmas Parade
- Berlin: Holiday Parade
- Jefferson: Parade of Lights
- Menomonie: WinterDaze Holiday Parade
- Mukwonago: Midnight Magic
- Omro: Holiday Parade & Celebration
- Sauk City: Holiday Light Parade
- Sheboygan Falls: Main Street Memories and Holiday Parade
- Waukesha: Waukesha Christmas Parade

==== Wyoming ====
- Big Piney: Big Piney Holiday Parade (Article)
- Buffalo: Buffalo Lighted Christmas Parade and Chili Feed
- Casper: Downtown Christmas Parade
- Cheyenne: Cheyenne Christmas Parade
- Cody: Cody Christmas Stroll and Lighted Parade
- Gillette: Gillette Parade of Lights
- Grand Targhee Resort: Grand Targhee Resort Torchlight Parade
- Jackson Hole Mountain Resort: Jackson Hole Mountain Resort New Year's Eve Torchlight Parade & Fireworks
- La Barge: La Barge Christmas Parade (Article)
- Lander: Light Up Lander Christmas Parade
- Laramie: Holiday Tree Lighting & Parade
- Pinedale: Annual Mountain Man Christmas Parade
- Powell: Powell Lighted Christmas Parade
- Rawlins: Rawlins Winterfest Weekend Starlight Christmas Parade
- Rock Springs: Annual Lighted Holiday Parade
- Saratoga: Christmas Parade and Winter Wonderland
- Snow King Mountain Resort: Snow King Mountain Resort Torchlight Parade
- Sundance: Sundance Lighted Parade
- White Pine Ski Resort: White Pine Ski Resort Torchlight Parade
- Worland: Worland Christmas Parade

== South America ==
=== Chile ===
- Santiago: Paris Parade

=== Colombia ===
- Medellín: es:Desfile de Mitos y Leyendas (Parade of Myths and Legends). Held annually on 7 December since 1974.

== See also ==
- Santa Claus parade
- List of objects dropped on New Year's Eve
