= Lolly scramble =

Children's party game

A lolly scramble is a children's party game common in New Zealand and Australia, in which an adult throws fistfuls of lollies into the air while the children 'scramble' to catch them or gather them from the ground.

The phrase lolly scramble is also used metaphorically in reference to government budgets and pre-election promises.

== History ==
The first recorded New Zealand lolly scramble was held in 1870. Nut scrambles were also recorded in the following decades.

Lolly scrambles were first held at picnics and parties, but by the 1930s had grown popular at galas, cinemas, ice skating rinks, and annual Santa parades.

== Procedure ==
One or more adults take on the role of distributing the lollies. This may be a parent at a small party, the principal at a school gala, or Santa at a Santa parade. Children are called to gather around, often with smaller children near the front. The adult then throws lollies into the air, in different directions so that all children have a chance to gather lollies. Children then compete to gather the lollies. When all the lollies have been claimed, adults may encourage the more successful children to share with less successful (especially younger) children. In some cases, the organisers may institute a limit to reduce competition and disappointment.

In an early variant, lollies were attached to the suit of the adult, and children snatched the lollies off as he ran.

== Controversy ==
Hygiene was raised as a concern by parents when unwrapped sweets were distributed by dirty hands and landed on 'polluted' ground.

Later as aerial drops became more popular, the speed at which lollies could hurt children. A child in 1992 dove under a moving Santa parade float to retrieve a lolly and broke his arm. This and other incidents caused many events to cancel or tighten restrictions on lolly scrambles. However, despite fears of government bans, no laws or bylaws were enacted against them, and under health and safety regulations, "Being hit by a flying lolly would not be defined as a significant hazard."
