= 6abc Dunkin' Thanksgiving Day Parade =

Annual Thanksgiving Day parade in Philadelphia

- Parade logo with Dunkin' Donuts's co-sponsorship, 2011
- Country of origin: United States
- Original language: English
- No. of episodes: 105

Production
- Production locations: 20th and JFK Boulevard, and then across JFK Boulevard, around Philadelphia City Hall, across the Benjamin Franklin Parkway, and ending at the Philadelphia Museum of Art
- Running time: 3.5 hours (with commercials)
- Production companies: 1920–1985: Gimbels; 1986–present: WPVI; 1986–2007: Boscov's; 2008–2010: IKEA; 2011–present: Dunkin'

Original release
- Network: WPVI-TV
- Release: November 25, 1920 – present

The 6abc Dunkin' Thanksgiving Day Parade is an annual Thanksgiving Day parade held in Philadelphia, Pennsylvania. It is currently sponsored and broadcast by ABC owned-and-operated television station WPVI-TV, through a co-sponsorship agreement with restaurant chain Dunkin'. It is currently the oldest Thanksgiving parade in the United States, having been held through the Great Depression and World War II, and was created by Gimbels department store in 1920. Gimbels sponsored the parade until the store's bankruptcy and closure in 1986.

== History ==
=== 20th century ===
Parade logo during Boscov's title sponsorship

The parade's logo, introduced in 2008, with IKEA's sponsorship of the parade

The annual Philadelphia Thanksgiving Day Parade began in 1920. It is the longest continuously held Thanksgiving day parade in the country. Like other parades of its type, it features balloons, floats, high school marching bands, and celebrities. Gimbels department store sponsored the 1920 parade as the Gimbels Thanksgiving Day Parade; it continued annually despite World War II.

Ellis Gimbel, one of the founders of Gimbels Department Stores, wanted his toy land to be the destination of holiday shoppers everywhere. He had more than 50 store employees dressed in costume and sent to walk in their first Thanksgiving Day parade. The parade featured floats as marchers paraded down Market Street, with the parade's finale featuring Santa Claus arriving at the eighth-floor toy department at Gimbels, where he climbed the ladder of a Philadelphia Fire Department ladder truck. Gimbels emulated other holiday parades already in existence. The Santa Claus Parade in Peoria, Illinois, is held on the day after Thanksgiving and is the oldest, continuously held holiday parade in the country since 1887, under the sponsorship of Frederick Block and the Schipper & Block, later renamed Block & Kuhl Department Store. Block's example led to the founding of similar parades in other cities. The parade tradition continues today.

When Batus Inc., which then owned Gimbels, was unable to find a buyer for the store in 1986, the Gimbels' chain was liquidated, leaving the fate of the country's oldest parade uncertain. Boscov's, a family-owned department store based in Reading, Pennsylvania, and WPVI (also known as 6abc), the ABC owned and operated station in Philadelphia, replaced Gimbels as sponsorships of the parade. They renamed the event as the 6abc Boscov's Thanksgiving Day Parade.

=== 21st century ===
In 2004, the parade celebrated its 85th anniversary with new balloons and floats. An opening number paid tribute to the celebrities who had participated during its history. In 2005, it featured the most celebrities in history, as well as eight new balloons, also the most in its history. In 2007, the parade presented the first parade float with a built-in ice rink. Disney's High School Musical: The Ice Tour utilized the rink.

In August 2008, Boscov's Department Stores filed for Chapter 11 bankruptcy protection and planned to close several stores, due to financial problems from the widespread recession. They withdrew their sponsorship of the parade. Swedish furniture manufacturer IKEA, which has a store and its North American home office in nearby Conshohocken, Pennsylvania, replaced Boscov's as parade co-sponsor from that year until 2010.

In June 2011, Dunkin' Donuts announced that they would sponsor the parade. In addition to balloons and marching bands, the show features ABC stars, actors from stage and screen, Disney characters, and local personalities, including members of the Action News team.

In 2020, due to the COVID-19 pandemic, the parade was held as a television-only event. The 6abc Dunkin' Thanksgiving Celebration featured modifications similar to those made by the Macy's and America's Thanksgiving Parades. The parade returned to its traditional format in 2021.

== Television coverage ==
Since 1966, the parade has been broadcast on WPVI, as well as simulcast on other television stations throughout the United States. Viewers could also watch the telecast on the station's website, 6abc.com, ABC News Live, Disney+ and Hulu, and since 2023, the parade has been aired internationally via the YouTube page of ABC News.

Good Morning America, ABC's national morning news program, sends a reporter to the event each year and covers festivities leading up to the parade. In 2013, then-Good Morning America weather anchor Sam Champion participated in hosting in his sixth year. In more recent years, current GMA weekday weather anchor Ginger Zee has participated in hosting.

Jim O'Brien was the program's first host; Dave Roberts became a perennial host upon joining the station in 1978. After the sudden death of O'Brien in 1983, WPVI's Lisa Thomas-Laury joined as Roberts's co-host. Together, Roberts and Thomas-Laury hosted the parade for nearly 20 years. When Thomas-Laury began to experience health problems in 2002, WPVI weather anchor Cecily Tynan replaced her. 2006 marked the program's first high-definition telecast.

Since her return to WPVI, Thomas-Laury helped host the finale in 2006 and 2007. In 2009, the station announced that Roberts would retire from broadcasting on December 11 of that year. Thomas-Laury made a special appearance in 2009, to celebrate Roberts's years as host. Thomas-Laury (who would subsequently retire from broadcasting in 2016) and Roberts both made a special appearance in the broadcast booth during the centennial edition of the parade in 2019.

Rick Williams took over for Roberts, starting with the 2010 edition. Tynan retired from broadcasting in August 2026 and Alicia Vitarelli will take over for her, starting with the 2026 edition.

Since 2024, the parade has simulcastly streamed nationally on ABC News Live, Disney+, and Hulu.

WPVI also broadcasts annual live coverage of Philadelphia's Pulaski, Columbus, and Puerto Rican parades.

== Balloons ==
Balloons have been created to represent a wide variety of characters from popular children's books, including folk tales, toys, comic books, animated movies and cartoons, television series (such as Sesame Street), films and other genres. Increasingly over the years, the balloons have featured characters who have tie-in marketing of toys, games, and accessories.

Year	Featured Balloons
2010	New: Bugs Bunny, Fred Flintstone, The Jetsons Returning: Cornucopia, Sam I Am from Green Eggs and Ham, Mr. Potato Head, Big Bird, Toy Train, Scooby-Doo, Twinkles the Snowman, Nutcracker, Turkey, Horton the Elephant, Elmo
2011	New: Buddy the Dinosaur from Dinosaur Train, Red from Fraggle Rock, Apollo the Dog Returning: Turkey, Cornucopia, Madeline, Curious George, Scooby-Doo, 2 Gift Packages, Bugs Bunny, Fred Flintstone, Toy Train, 2 Gingerbread Men, Kermit the Frog
2012	New: Thomas the Tank Engine, The Very Hungry Caterpillar, The Lorax, Mr. Conductor from Dinosaur Train, Fireman Mr. Potato Head, Sid the Science Kid Returning: Cookie Monster, Scooby-Doo, Bugs Bunny, Elmo, Pizzazz the Snowman, T-Rex, 2 Gift Packages, Turkey
2013	New: Chuggington Returning: Mr. Potato Head, Snowflake, Holiday Stocking and Christmas Bell: Balloons were limited this year due to winds
2014	New: Maisy Mouse, Caillou, Garfield Santa, Bob the Builder, Mistletoes the Snowman Returning: My Little Pony, Mr. Potato Head, Clifford the Big Red Dog, Plex from Yo Gabba Gabba, Strawberry Shortcake, The Lorax, The Grinch, Pajanimals, Mr. Conductor from Dinosaur Train, The Cat in the Hat, Horton, Nutcrackers
2015	New: Phila-A-Turkey, Tasmanian Devil, Daniel Tiger, Bubbles the Goldfish Returning: Red from Fraggle Rock, Garfield Santa, Strawberry Shortcake, Sam I Am from Green Eggs and Ham, Scooby-Doo, Mr. Potato Head Fireman, Gift Boxes, Thomas the Tank Engine, The Grinch, Rudolph the Red-Nosed Reindeer, My Little Pony
2016	New: Foofa from Yo Gabba Gabba, Tweety Bird, Captain Barnacles Returning: Olivia the Pig, T-Rex, Tasmanian Devil, Curious George, The Cat in the Hat, Mr. Potato Head, The Very Hungry Caterpillar, Bugs Bunny, The Grinch, Scooby-Doo, Daniel Tiger
2017	New: Buddy the Dinosaur (from Dinosaur Train), Penguins of Madagascar, Fiddlesticks the Holiday Mouse, Thing 1 and Thing 2 Returning: Bugs Bunny, Clifford the Big Red Dog, Daniel Tiger, Strawberry Shortcake, Gingerbread Man, Red from Fraggle Rock, Very Hungry Caterpillar, Pajanimals
2018	New: Where's Waldo? Returning: The Grinch, Thing 1, Thing 2, Hello Kitty. Santa Claus, Brainy Smurf, Strawberry Shortcake, T-Rex, Daniel Tiger, Underdog, Pizzazz the Snowman
2019	All balloons grounded due to severe winds
2020	None
2021	New: Pac-Man, Jerold the Bookworm, Bumble the Abominable Snowman, Gingersnap the Elf Returning: Fiddlesticks, Daniel Tiger, Rudolph, Turkey, Buddy the Dinosaur, Clifford the Big Red Dog, The Cat in the Hat, Cupcakes
2022	New: Smurfette, Peppa Pig, Alma, Leonardo from Teenage Mutant Ninja Turtles, Eva Green Tree Returning: Mr. Potato Head, Thomas the Tank Engine, Bumble the Abominable Snowman, Gift Box, 2 Ornaments, Bugs Bunny, Strawberry Shortcake, Turkey
2023	New: Sunny Starscout from My Little Pony: Make Your Mark, Hermie the Elf, Gobo from Fraggle Rock Returning: Turkey, Bumble the Abominable Snowman, Mr. Potato Head Fireman, Pac-Man, Horton the Elephant, Magenta and Tartan Ornaments, Pizazz the Snowman, Red from Fraggle Rock, My Little Pony, Strawberry Shortcake, Neon Gift Box, Smurfette
2024	New: Butterscotch the Elf, Dunkin’ Gift Boxes, Daniel Tiger as The Drum Major, Sunny Starscout from My Little Pony: Make Your Mark, Twinkles the Snowman, Bumble the Abominable Snowman Returning: Turkey, Fancy Holiday Bell, Gingersnap the Elf, Brainy Smurf, Tweety Bird, Tasmanian Devil, Holiday Wreath, Rudolph
2025	New: Ray (Good Morning America’s mascot), Green Nutcracker, Hiccup Returning: Turkey, Strawberry Shortcake, Smurfette, Clifford the Big Red Dog, Fancy Holiday Bell, Peppa Pig, Twinkles the Snowman, Hermie the Elf, Daniel Tiger as The Drum Major, Gingerbread Man
To be featured in 2026	New: Wintry Daniel Tiger, Chip the Dog Returning: Ray (Good Morning America’s mascot), Turkey, Hiccup, Fancy Holiday Bell, Sunny Starscout from My Little Pony, Smurfette, Tweety Bird, Nutcracker, Pizazz the Snowman, Hermie the Elf, Orange Gift Box, Pink Gift Box, Rudolph, Gingerbread Man, Blue Gift Box

== Stars, performers, and acts ==
In addition to the well-known balloons and floats, the parade also features live music and other performances. High-school marching bands from across the country participate, and the television broadcasts feature performances by famous singers and bands as well as appearances by local celebrities and actors from ABC shows. Since 1997, the parade has also featured a tap routine called "FanTAPulous," with more than 450 dancers from the East Coast. Other special guests include state and national beauty contest winners, cheerleaders of major sports teams, casts from musicals performing in Philadelphia, and Santa and Mrs. Claus.

In 2024, the Philadelphia Ghostbusters joined the parade line up for the first time. They were accompanied by members of the Delco Ghostbusters, Ghostbusters of New Jersey, and Diamond State Ghostbusters.

== Marching bands ==
Year	Performing Marching Bands
2013	A.I. DuPont Tiger Marching Band (Greenville, DE), Arab High School Marching Band (Arab, AL), Brentwood High School Band (Brentwood, TN), Central Carroll High School Marching Band (Carrolton, GA), Campaign Central High School Marching Marroons (Champaign, IL), East Mississippi Community College Marching Band (Scooba, MS), Greater Richmond Combined Marching Band (Richmond, VA), Jay County High School Band (Portland, IN), Nansemond River High School Magnificent Marching Warrior Band (Suffolk, VA), Naples High School Golden Eagle Marching Band (Naples, FL), Pennsbury High School Band (Fairless Hills, PA), The Pride of Southside High School (Southside, AL), Sullivan South High School Rebel Band (Kingsport, TN), Tournament of Bands All Star Marching Band (from 9 states), Ridge View High School Band (Columbia, SC), West Chester University Golden Rams Marching Band (West Chester, PA), Whiteland Community High School Marching Warriors (Whiteland, IN)
2014	A.I. DuPont Tiger Marching Band (Greenville, DE), Tate High School Band (Cantonment, FL), Cardinal Regiment and Cardettes (Athlens, TX), Coffman High School Band (Dublin, OH), Tournament of Bands All-Star Band (from 14 states), Decatur Central High School Marching Band (Indianapolis, IN), Bellefontaine High School Band (Bellefontaine, OH), Athens Drive High School Band (Raleigh, NC), Georgia All Select High School Band (Georgia), Jerome High School Band (Dublin, OH), Freedom High School Band (Orlando, FL), Colquitt County High School Band (Moultrie, GA), Hartselle High School Band (Hartselle, AL), Albertville High School Band (Albertville, AL), Scioto High School Band (Dublin, OH), Destrehan High School Band (Destrehan, LA), Middletown - Appoquiniming combined High School Band (Middletown, DE), Brunswick High School Band (Brunswick, GA), Boardman High School Band (Youngstown, OH)
2015	Tournament of Bands All-Star Marching Band (from 14 states), A.I. Dupont Tiger Marching Band (Greenville, DE), Smiths Station High School Panther Spirit Band (Smith Station, AL), Alan B. Shepard Marching Band (Palos Heights, IL), Pennsbury High School Marching Band (Fairless Hills, PA), The Sound of Brownsburg High School Marching Band (Brownsburg, IN), Laporte High School Marching Band (Laporte, IN), Jackson Memorial Jaguar Band (Jackson, NJ), Combined bands of Midland Valley and Silver Bluff High Schools (Granitville, SC), Fishers High School Marching Tiger Band (Fishers, IN), Riverview High School Band (Sarasota, FL), Oneonta High School Band (Oneonta, AL), Kutztown University Marching Unit (Kutztown, PA), Pendleton Heights High School Marching Band (Pendleton, IN), Heights Youth Club and Marching Band (Montego Bay - St. James, Jamaica)
2016	A.I. DuPont High School Tiger Band (Greenville, DE), Anthony Wayne High School Marching Generals (Whitehouse, OH), Baldwin County All-Star Band (Baldwin County, AL), Brooks High School Marching Band (Killen, AL), Dwight Morrow High School Marching Band (Englewood, NJ), East Hills Middle School Band (Bethlehem, PA), Heights Marching Band (Montego Bay, Jamaica), Homewood High School Patriot Band (Homewood, AL), Huntsville High School Crimson Panther Marching Band (Huntsville, AL), Jonathan Adler High School Marching Band (Plain City, OH), North Augusta High School Jacket Regiment (North Augusta, SC), NorthWood High School Red Regiment (Nappanee, IN), Penn High School Marching Kingsmen (Mishawaka, IN), Pennsbury High School Marching Band (Fairless Hills, PA), The Pickens and Fannin Count High School Band (Jasper and Blue Ridge, GA), Rome High School Marching Band (Rome, GA), Tournament of Bands All Star Marching Band (from 9 states), Wayne County High School Marching Band (Jesup, GA), Winchester Community High School Band (Winchester, IN), Woodland High School Marching Band (Stockbridge, GA)
2017	
2018	A.I. DuPont High School Marching Band (Wilmington, DE), Bellefontaine High School Band (Delaware), Biloxi High School Band (Biloxi, MS), Bedford North Lawrence Marching Stars (Bedford, IN), Bloomington North High School Band (Bloomington, IN), Braden River High School Band (Bradenton, FL), Brien McMahon High School Band (Norwalk, CT), Crestview High School Band (Crestview, FL), University of Delaware Band (Newark, DE), Defiance High School Band (Delaware), Dublin Jerome High School Band (Dublin, OH), Dublin Scioto Irish Band (Dublin, OH), Dublin Coffman Band (Dublin, OH), Lafayette Jefferson High School Band (Lafayette, IN), Lowndes High Marching Band (Valdosta, GA), Lenape Regional High School Band (Burlington County, NJ), Muskego High School Marching Band (Muskego, WI), Olentangy Orange High School Band (Lewis Center, OH), Pearl City High School Marching Band (Pearl City, HI), Pennsbury High School Band (Fairless Hills, PA), Tournament of Bands All Star Marching Band (from 9 states), Scotland County High School Band (Laurinburg, NC), Wyoming All-State Band (Wyoming)
2019	A.I. DuPont High School Tiger Marching Band (Wilmington, DE), Bainbridge High School Marching Band (Bainbridge, GA), Ben Davis Marching Giants (Indianapolis), Brunswick Marching Pirates (Brunswick, GA), Colquitt County High School Band (Norman Park, GA), East Hills Middle School Band (Bethlehem, PA), Freedom Patriot Band (Bethlehem, PA), Gulf Coast High School Marching Sharks (Naples, FL), Guntersville High School Crimson Guard (Guntersville, AL), Jackson High School Marching Band (Ohio), Jacket Pride Marching Band (Denham Springs, LA), Kingsway Regional Marching Band (Gloucester County, NJ), Mary G. Montgomery High School Band (Semmes, AL), Morgantown High School Marching Band (Morgantown, WV), Pennsbury High School Band (Fairless Hills, PA), Pride of Portage Marching Band (Portage, IN), Spirit of Twin Lakes High School Band (Monticello, IN), Tournament of Bands All Star Marching Band (multiple states), University of New Hampshire Marching Band (Durham, NH), West Chester University Golden Rams Marching Band (West Chester, PA), White Knoll High School Band (Lexington, SC)
2020	None
2021	None
2022	Clearview Regional High School Band (Gloucester County, NJ), Decatur Central High School Marching Band and Color Guard (Indianapolis), East Hills Middle School Marching Band (Bethlehem, PA), Jasper High School Band (Jasper, IN), Kingsway Regional High School Band (Gloucester County, NJ), Mount Vernon High School Marching Band (Indiana), Parkland High School Band (Allentown, PA), Pennsbury High School Marching Band (Fairless Hills, PA), Pocono Mountain East High School Band (Swiftwater, PA), Reynoldsburg Raider Marching Band (Reynoldsburg, OH), Salem High School Marching Band (Virginia), Whiteland Community High School Band (Whiteland, IN)

== 6abc Dunkin' Donuts Holiday Food Drive ==
For more than 25 years, WPVI-TV has partnered with the Boy Scouts of America Cradle of Liberty Council in their Scouting For Food program to collectively coordinate one of the most massive food drives in the nation. Until 2006, it was called the 6abc/Boy Scouts Holiday Food Drive. In 2006, the Holiday Food Drive amassed 120,000 lbs of food, and for 2010 Boy Scouts troops' efforts led to the collection of over 40,000 pounds of food towards the cumulative total. The food drive distributes paper bags to residents' homes and collection boxes at local stores in the region. A few weeks later, they are sent to help those in need at Thanksgiving and the end of year holidays. The Boy Scouts also go to the parade route every year and collect food from spectators. The parade and food drive sponsors are generally the same. In June 2011, Dunkin' Donuts announced that they would also co-sponsor the food drive. Proceeds of the food drive currently benefit Philabundance.

== See also ==
- Mummers Parade
- Philadelphia Welcome America Festival
- Santa Claus parades
- List of Christmas and holiday season parades
- Macy's Thanksgiving Day Parade
- Toronto Santa Claus Parade
- Adelaide Christmas Pageant
- America's Thanksgiving Parade
