= WMB =

WMB may refer to:

== Marching bands ==
- University of New Hampshire Wildcat Marching Band
- Western Mustang Band, of the University of Western Ontario
- Wildcat Marching Band, of the University of Kentucky

== Transport ==
- Warrnambool Airport in Victoria, Australia
- Wembley Central station in London, England
- West Midlands Bus in the Midlands, England
- Wetzikon–Meilen tramway, Zürich, Switzerland

== Other uses ==
- WMB (AM), a radio station in Auburn, Maine, United States, licensed from 1922 until 1923
- IBM WebSphere Message Broker
- Wambaya language, spoken in Australia
- Williams Companies, an American energy company
- WMB 3D: World's Most Beautiful, an American fashion magazine
- "Variation IV (Allegro di molto) 'W.M.B.'", of the Enigma Variations
