= Cavalcade of Magi =

Traditional parade

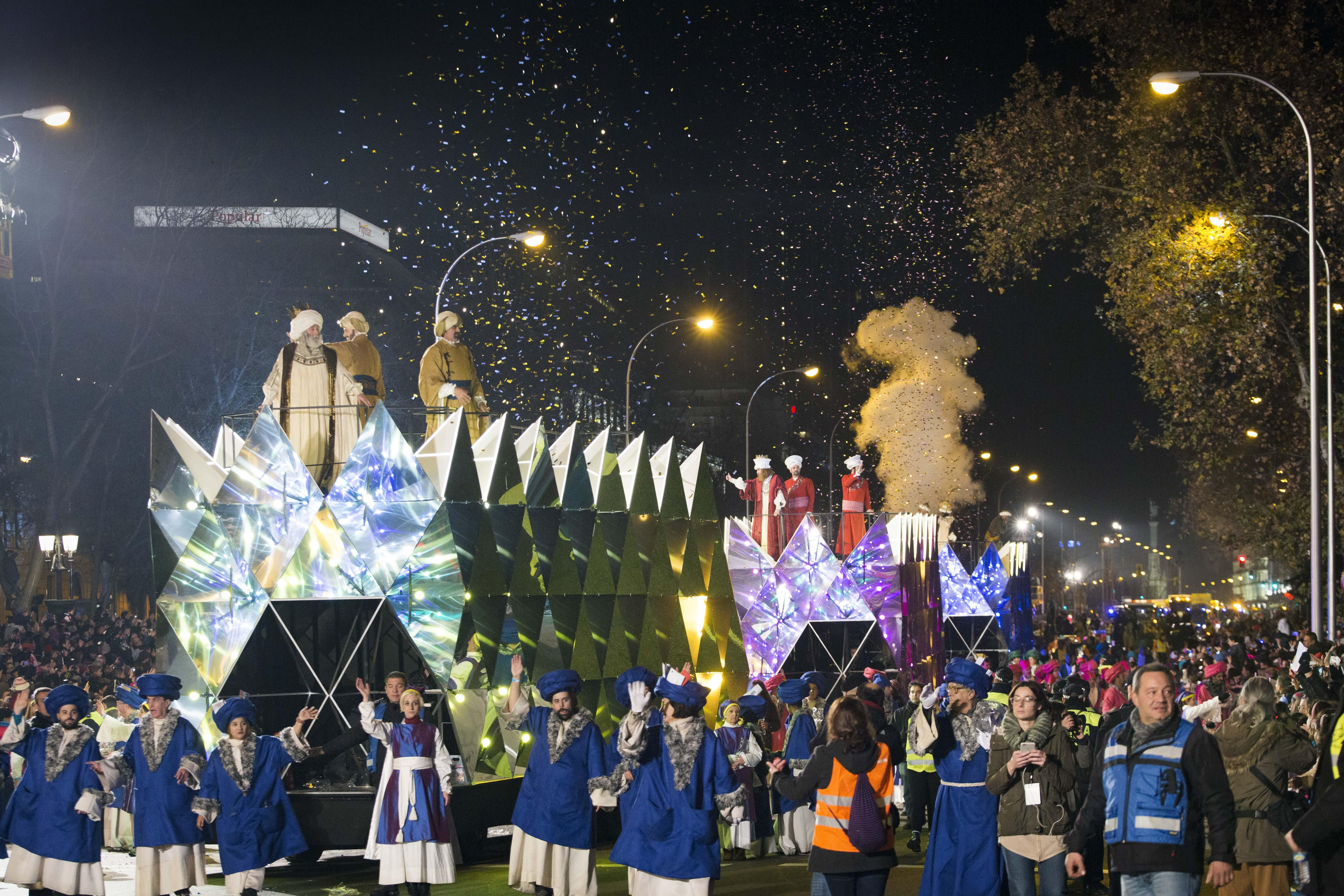
Cavalcade of Magi in Madrid

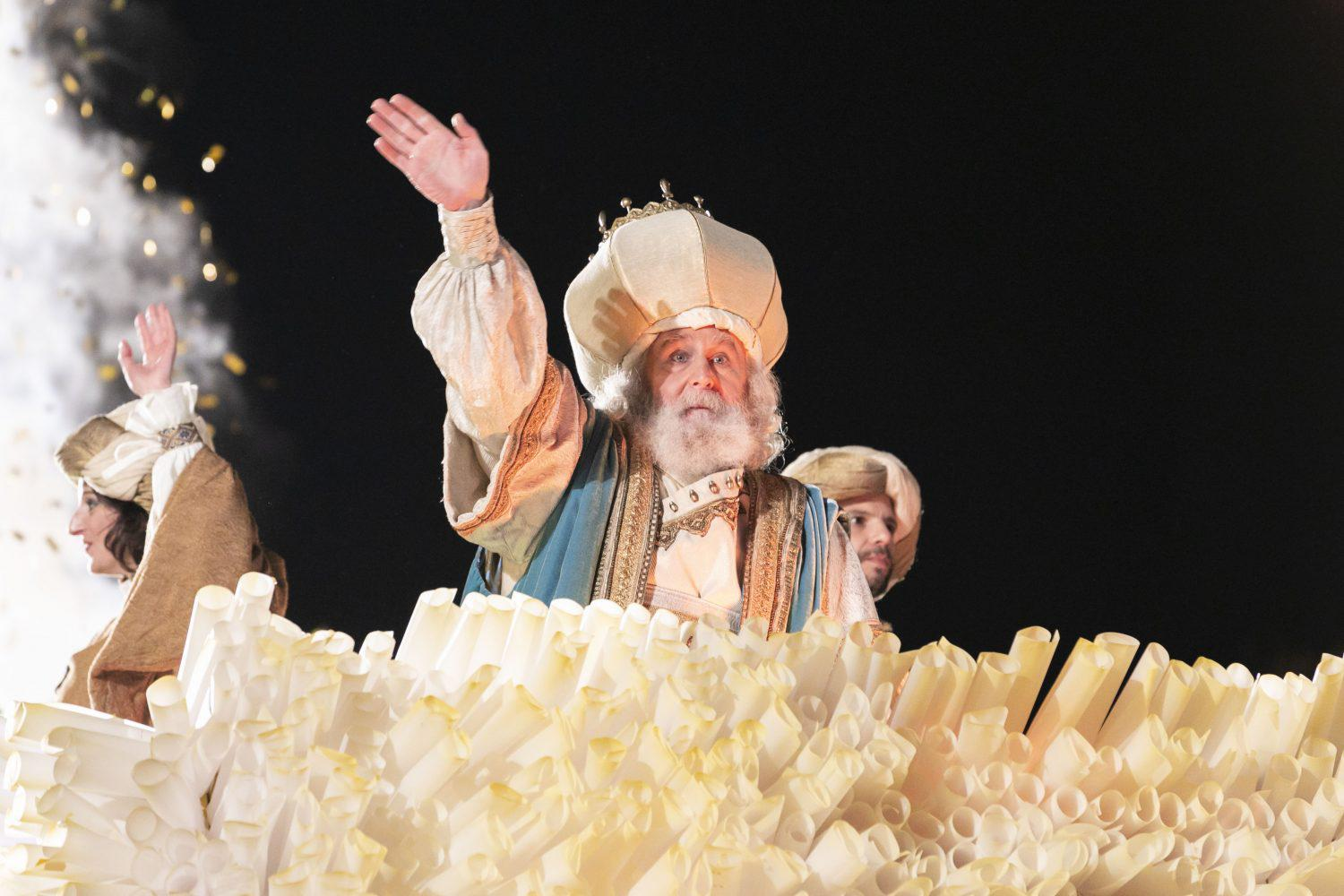
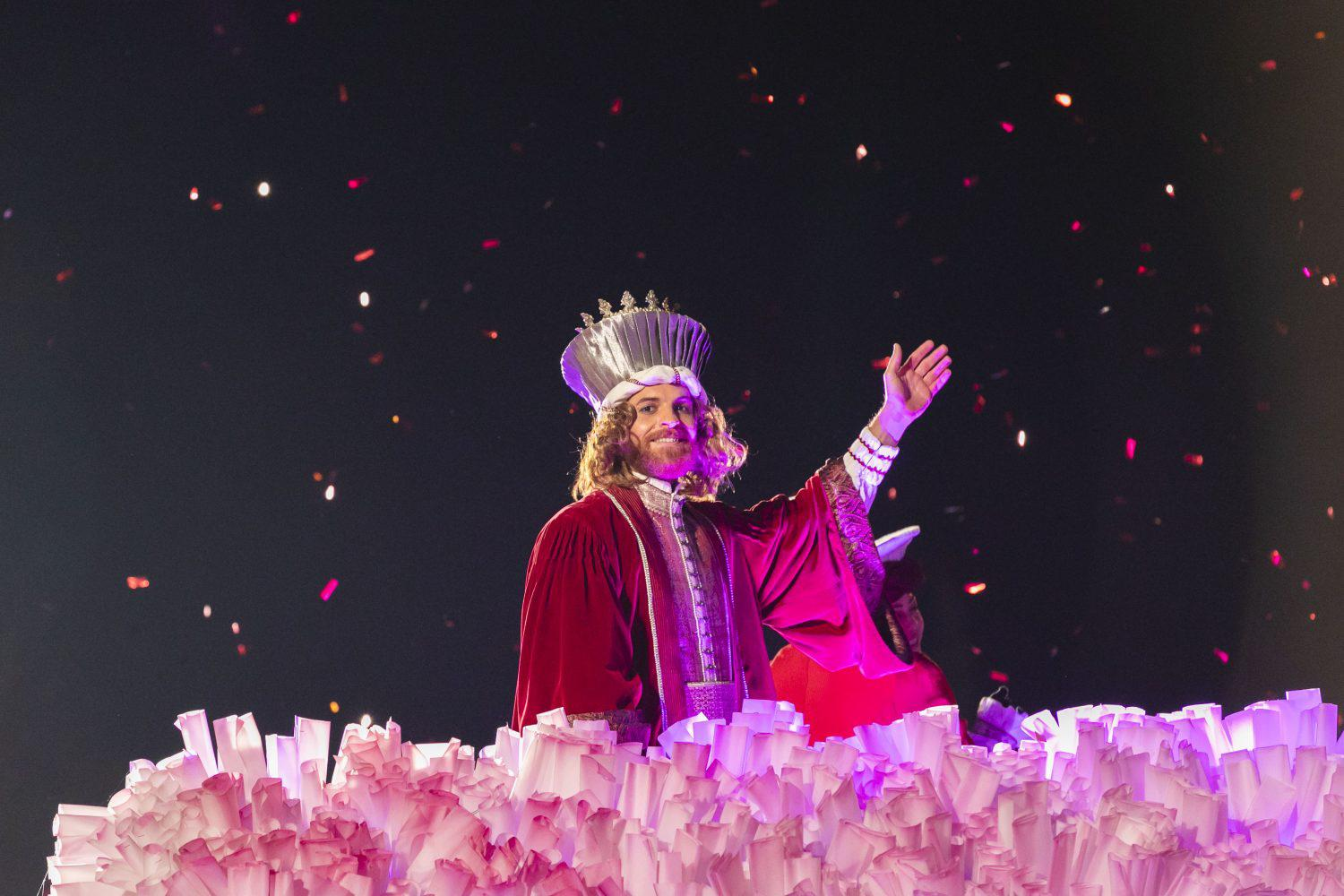
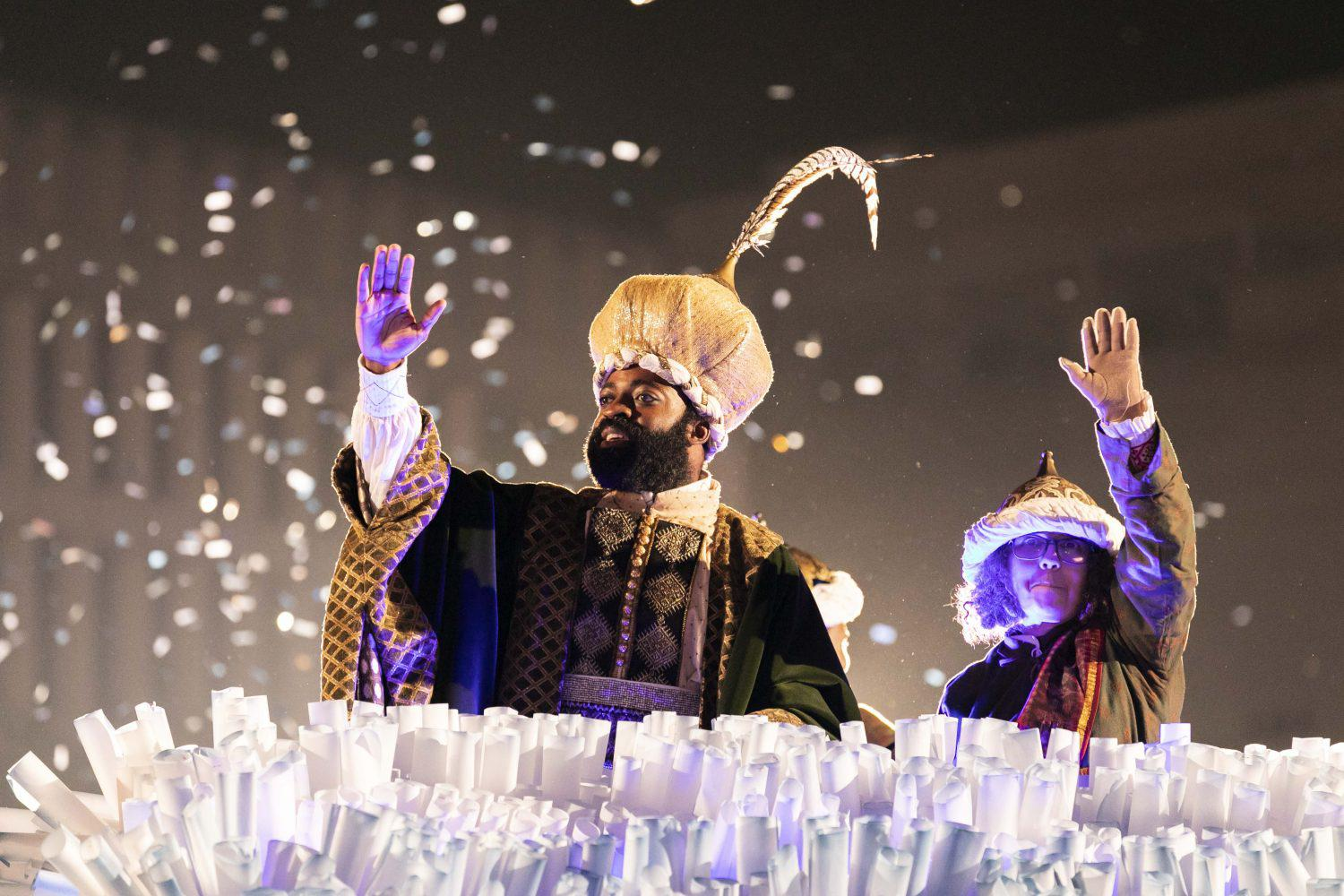
Melchior, Caspar, and Balthazar waving from their floats during their cavalcade in Madrid

The Cavalcade of Magi (Note: Known in Spanish as Cabalgata de los Reyes Magos, in Galician as Cabalgata dos Reis Magos, in Basque as Errege magoen desfilea, in Catalan Cavalcada de Reis, in Esperanto as Kavalkado de la Tri Reĝoj, and in Polish as Orszak Trzech Króli.) is a traditional parade with floats carrying the Three Magi taking place in practically all cities and villages in Spain on the evening of 5 January (Epiphany Eve). The three Biblical Magi – Melchior, Caspar, and Balthazar – ride through the streets, as their pages collect the last letters from the children and throw candy to the people in attendance. The cavalcade usually includes dancers and musicians, as well as other assistants to the Magi. The cavalcades are also held in Andorra, Gibraltar, Argentina, Poland, and in some towns in Mexico and Venezuela.

According to the tradition, the Magi come from the Orient on their camels to visit the houses of all the children while they are sleeping, entering the houses through the balconies using ladders to leave the children the gifts they have asked for in their letters. So after greeting the Magi at the cavalcade in town, children are supposed to go home, clean and put their shoes beside the Christmas tree or the nativity scene, and go to bed early. Paper cut-outs are usually also put out to adorn the scene, and the children usually put out some sweets and something to drink for the Magi to sit and enjoy themselves for a moment before moving on to the next house, and a bucket of water for their camels. The following morning, the children find the gifts from the Magi in and around their shoes. Those who have behaved badly during the previous year receive coal rather than gifts, though (as in the case of Santa Claus) this is not a frequent occurrence. They might get coal candy, though.

The oldest cavalcade is documented in 1855 in Barcelona, and the longest-running cavalcade takes place in Alcoi (Alicante), which is first documented in 1866 and celebrated uninterruptedly since 1885.

The great cavalcade of Madrid is broadcast live on Televisión Española every year since 1964, whereas regional television channels broadcast their own parades. Small towns and villages celebrate cavalcades with traditional props, some of which involve Romans, shepherds and camels, while other places have modernized to tractors and fancy cars, though most of the parade goes by on foot and in a few floats.

In Poland the first cavalcade took place in 2009 in Warsaw. Since 2010, the Warsaw cavalcade has been broadcast live on Telewizja Polska. In 2016, over 450 Polish cities held their own cavalcade.

== See also ==
- List of Christmas and holiday season parades
- Biblical Magi
- Epiphany
- King cake
- Twelfth Night
- Star boys' singing procession
- Santa Claus parade
