= Cecily Tynan =

American television meteorologist (born 1969)

- Born: Cecily Joan Tynan; March 19, 1969 (age 57); Newtown, Connecticut, U.S.
- Education: Washington and Lee University
- Occupations: Broadcast television anchor; journalist; weathercaster
- Years active: 1991–2026
- Notable credit: Action News
- Height: 5 ft 5 in (1.65 m)
- Spouse: Greg Watson
- Children: 2

Cecily Joan Tynan (born March 19, 1969) is a retired American television meteorologist who worked with WPVI-TV from 1995 until her retirement in 2026. She formerly hosted the Saturday evening public affairs program Primetime Weekend.

== Education ==
Tynan is a 1991 graduate of Washington and Lee University, from where she earned a degree with majors in journalism and politics. She holds American Meteorological Society television seal number 1099.

== Career ==
She came to WPVI from KTNV-TV in Las Vegas, Nevada, where she worked as a weather and news anchor for Good Morning Las Vegas. Prior to that, she was the weekend weather anchor and a general assignment reporter for WDBJ in Roanoke, Virginia.

At WPVI, she started out as a weekend weathercaster and general reporter. She later became the weekday morning weathercaster. When Dave Roberts cut back his duties in 2003, she became the weathercaster for weeknights at 5:30 and 11 pm. After Lisa Thomas-Laury went on medical leave, Tynan took over as co-host of several locally produced specials, including the 6abc Dunkin' Donuts Thanksgiving Day Parade, the 4th of July Parade, Philly on Wheels, and the Philadelphia Flower Show. In 2009, after Dave Roberts retired, she replaced him on the 5 pm and 6 pm weathercasts while maintaining her role as the 11 pm meteorologist.

After 30 years with WPVI, Cecily announced on July 23, 2026, she will be retiring. Her final broadcast was during the 6 pm broadcast on Monday, August 31 of that year.

== Personal life ==
After she and her first husband, school teacher Michael Badger, divorced, she married Greg Watson, who was married to another when they started dating The couple has two children.

Tynan is a triathlete and has run marathons. She was featured on the February 2001 cover of Runner's World magazine. The Broadcast Pioneers of Philadelphia inducted Tynan into their Hall of Fame in 2012.
