= Hollywood Christmas Parade =

Annual American holiday parade

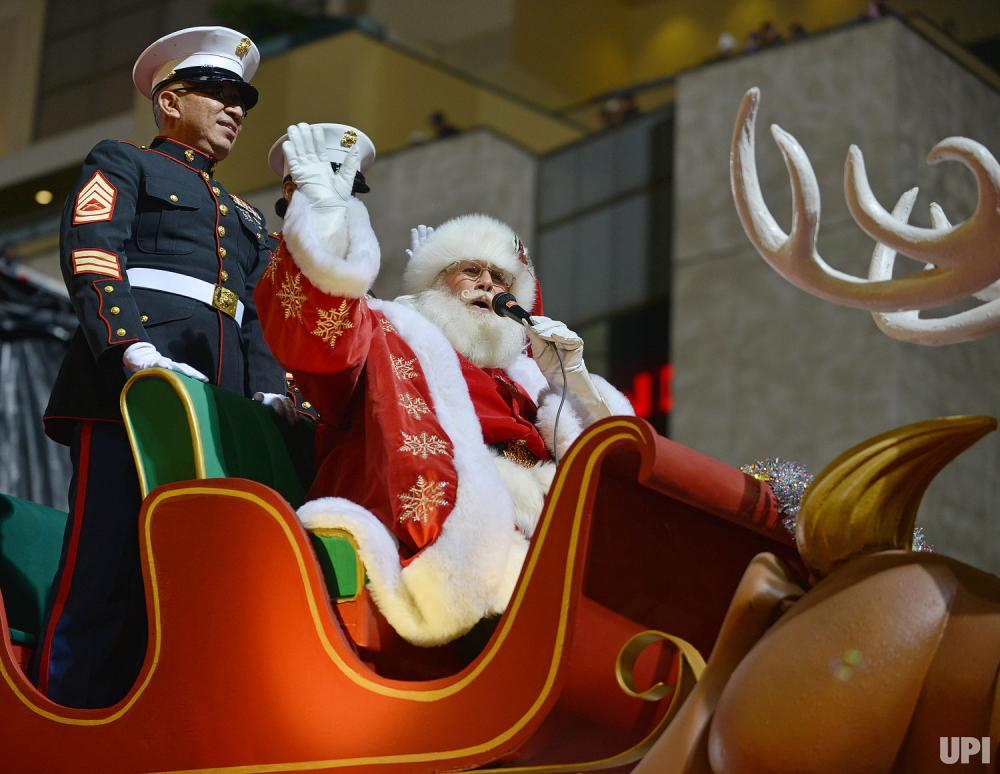
National Santa Tim Connaghan appeared for over 20 years as Santa for the Hollywood Christmas Parade.

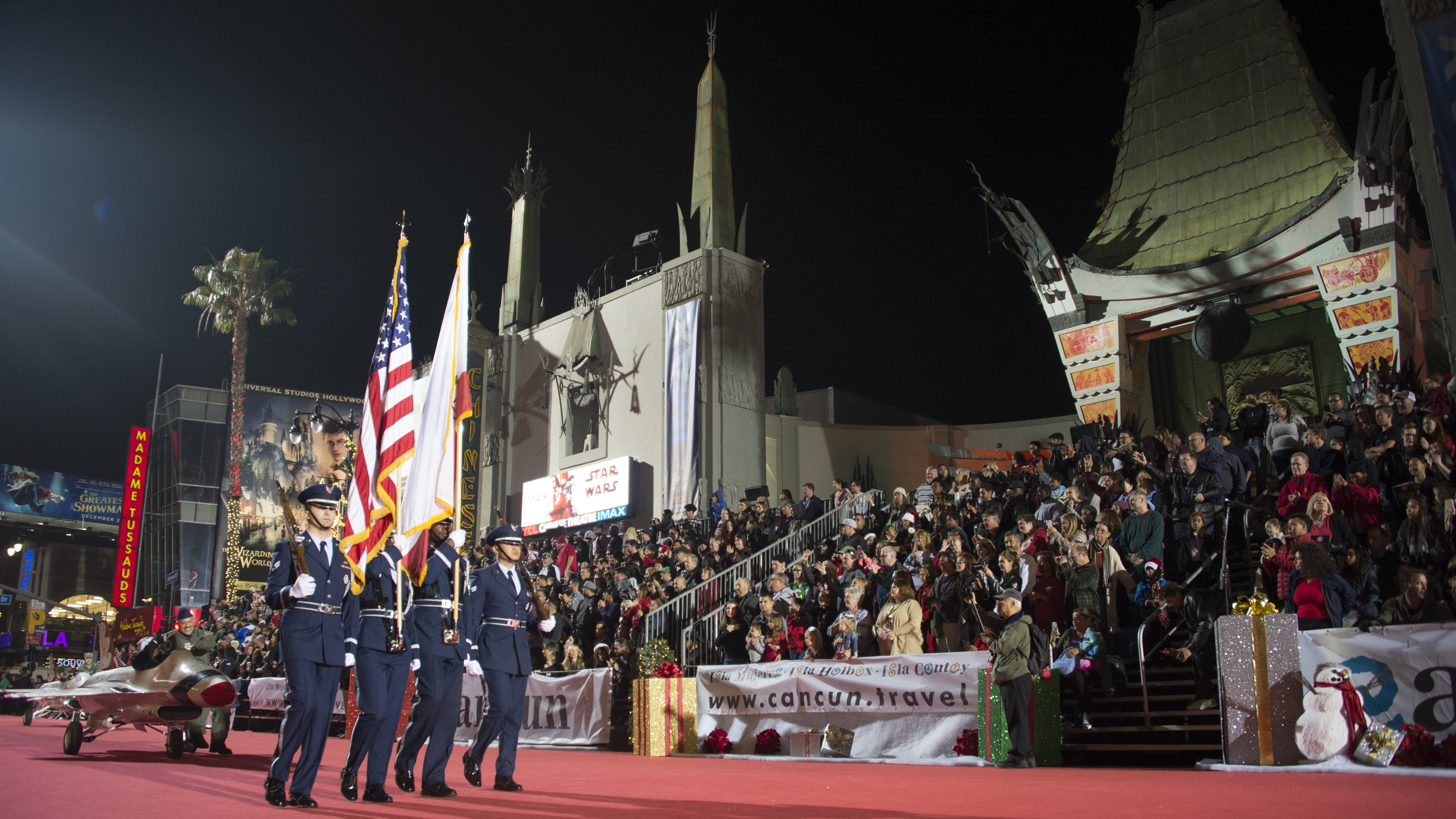
Hollywood Christmas parade

The Hollywood Christmas Parade (formerly the Hollywood Santa Parade and Santa Claus Lane Parade) is an annual parade held on the Sunday after Thanksgiving in Hollywood, Los Angeles, California. It follows a 3.5-mile (5.6 km) route along Hollywood Boulevard, then back along Sunset Boulevard, featuring various celebrities.

Traditionally, Santa Claus appears at the end.

== History ==
=== 1900s ===
Beginning in 1928, Hollywood merchants transformed a one-mile stretch of Hollywood Boulevard into "Santa Claus Lane" to boost shopping. Part of the promotion was a daily parade featuring Santa Claus and a film star. Originally called the Santa Claus Lane Parade, the inaugural event featured only Santa Claus and the actress Jeanette Loff.

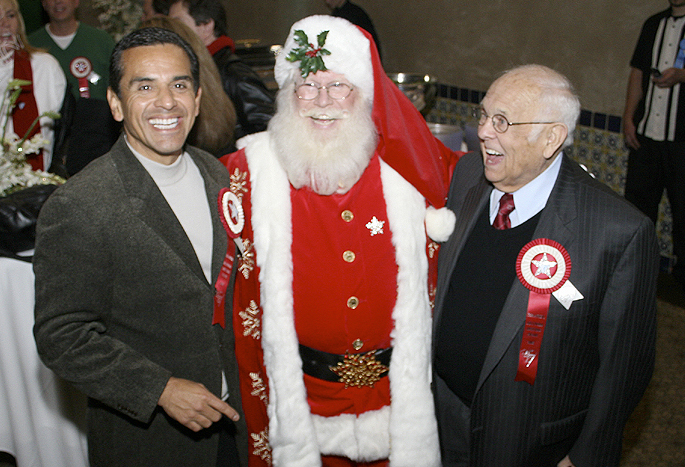
Los Angeles Mayor Anthony Villaraigosa, National Santa and Honorary Hollywood Mayor Johnny Grant at Hollywood Christmas Parade.

The parade continued to grow in scale with the help of local businesses and the community. In 1931, Santa Claus rode a truck-pulled float instead of the reindeer-pulled carriage of previous years. American Legion Post 43 marched with a color guard, drum line, and bugle corps.

The parade was suspended from 1942 to 1944 due to World War II and reopened in 1945 with record attendance.

In 1947, Gene Autry asked his vice president and business partner songwriter Oakley Haldeman, to write a Christmas song for Autry's first Grand Marshall appearance at that years Santa Claus Lane Christmas parade. It was wife Dixie Haldeman who came up with the title verse "Here Comes Santa Claus (Right Down Santa Claus Lane)" on June 21, 1947. Autry would become a perennial Grand Marshal of the parade thereafter.

The parade continued to grow throughout the 1950s, '60s, and '70s, adding floats, animals, bands and celebrities. By 1978, the parade had been renamed the Hollywood Christmas Parade in order to attract more celebrities, and was broadcast locally on KTLA (which was purchased by Autry's Golden West Broadcasters in 1964) with the help of Autry and Johnny Grant. This change coincided with a shift in the parade's scheduling from Thanksgiving Eve to the Sunday after Thanksgiving, and continued to be a decades-long tradition on Los Angeles's channel 5, even after Autry's sale of KTLA to KKR in 1982, then Tribune Broadcasting in 1985.

=== 2000s ===
In 2002, an attempt to present the parade as a primetime special on NBC sponsored by Blockbuster imperiled the future of the parade, as the presentation was lowly-rated. Renamed the Blockbuster Hollywood Christmas Spectacular and produced by Bob Bain, the parade was nearly completely dispensed with for pre-recorded and rehearsed spotlights in the vein of NBC's popular Macy's Thanksgiving Day Parade, pre-recorded musical performances from LeAnn Rimes and Destiny's Child to promote their new holiday albums, along with much lower wattage star power, as most of the celebrities highlighted were either older or lower-tier actors exclusively starring on NBC series. Inexplicably, the special ended with a completely unrelated stunt involving a 170 foot (52 m) fall by stuntperson Mikal Kartvedt off a 12-story building to promote the Blockbuster-exclusive home video rental release of the film XXX (the actual parade would air without any of the Bain-produced elements on Christmas morning on KCOP-TV). The following year, the Hollywood Chamber of Commerce announced it would discontinue airing the parade on KTLA and other Tribune Broadcasting stations due to rising production costs.

In March 2007, the Hollywood Chamber of Commerce decided to end the parade's run due to lack of celebrities and a loss of $100,000 for the 2006 production, which The Associated Press said cost about $1 million to mount.

However, later in 2007, the City of Los Angeles created a new parade to replace the Hollywood Christmas Parade, entitled the Hollywood Santa Parade and produced on the weekend after Thanksgiving (the original parade had traditionally been held on the Wednesday evening before the holiday). Participation in the new parade became by invitation only, and Bob Barker, fresh from his farewell tapings as host of The Price Is Right, was that year's Parade Grand Marshal. 2007 and 2008, KTLA aired the new parade on a tape-delayed basis.

It was later announced that MyNetworkTV would telecast the 2009 parade (with the Hollywood Christmas Parade name restored) in two consecutive prime-time showings: the first scheduled for December 10, the second for Christmas Eve night. The parade has since been produced annually by Associated Television International, which then coordinated airings on the Hallmark Channel, and in traditional syndication in later years.

Since 2015, the parade has been recorded and edited, then aired as a part of The CW's annual holiday programming, still being produced by ATI (thus airing on KTLA locally as a part of the CW lineup). Lifestyle also carries the parade internationally.

The parade was not held in 2020 because of the COVID-19 pandemic. Instead, a TV special titled The Hollywood Christmas Parade Greatest Moments premiered on December 4, 2020 on The CW.

== Grand Marshals ==
- 1928 - Jeanette Loff
- 1932 - Joe E. Brown
- 1939 - Gene Autry
- 1940
  - Sheriff Eugene Biscailuz
  - Joan Leslie
  - Roy Rogers
  - Harry Sherman
- 1941 - Irene Rich
- 1948 - Bob Hope
- 1949–1951 Sheriff Eugene Biscailuz
- 1957 - Art Linkletter
- 1958 - Lawrence Welk
- 1959 - Charlton Heston
- 1960, 1981 - Dale Evans and Roy Rogers
- 1961 - Gene Autry
- 1962 - Danny Thomas
- 1963 - Mary Pickford
- 1964 - Dick Van Dyke
- 1965 - Robert Vaughn
- 1966 - Pat Boone
- 1967 - Fred MacMurray
- 1968 - Buddy Ebsen
- 1969 - Walter Matthau
- 1970 - Ernest Borgnine
- 1971 - Johnny Mathis
- 1972 - General Robert E. Cushman Jr.
- 1973 - Danny Thomas
- 1974 - John Wayne
- 1975 - Lawrence Welk
- 1976 - General Omar Bradley
- 1977 - Jimmy Stewart
- 1978 - Bob Hope
- 1979 - Robert Wagner and Natalie Wood
- 1980 - Gene Autry
- 1982 - Ron Howard
- 1983 - George Peppard
- 1984 - Michael Landon
- 1985 - William Shatner
- 1986 - Mickey and Minnie Mouse
- 1987 - James Stewart
- 1988 - Tony Danza
- 1989 - Sammy Davis Jr.
- 1990 - Arnold Schwarzenegger
- 1991 - Charlton Heston
- 1992 - Tom Arnold and Roseanne Barr
- 1993 - Bob and Dolores Hope
- 1994 - Louis Gossett Jr.
- 1995 - Tony Danza
- 1996 - David Hasselhoff
- 1997 - Tom Arnold
- 1998 - Robert Urich
- 1999 - Beau Bridges
- 2000 - Dennis Hopper and Frankie Muñiz
- 2001 - Peter Fonda
- 2002 - Mickey Rooney
- 2003 - Johnny Grant
- 2004 - Magic Johnson
- 2005 - Antonio Villaraigosa
- 2006 - George Lopez
- 2007 - Bob Barker
- 2008 - Joy and Regis Philbin
- 2009 - Susan Lucci
- 2010 - Larry King
- 2011 - Marie Osmond
- 2012 - Joe Mantegna
- 2013 - Buzz Aldrin
- 2014 - Stevie Wonder
- 2015 - Penn & Teller
- 2016 - Olivia Newton-John
- 2017 - Mehmet C. Oz
- 2018 - Nancy O'Dell
- 2019 - Mario López
- 2021 - Sheryl Underwood
- 2022 - Danny Trejo
- 2023 - Paris Davis
- 2024 - Jeremy Renner
- 2025 - Luke Wilson
- 2026 - Nischelle Turner and Kevin Frazier
- 2027 - Lulu Wilson

== See also ==
- List of Christmas and holiday season parades
- Santa Claus parades

== Resources ==
- Official website
- Hollywood Christmas Parade (seeing-stars)
- Hollywood Christmas Parade (Chamber of Commerce)
