= Kolkata Christmas Festival =

Christmas carnival in India

Kolkata Christmas Festival, held every December in on Park Street, Kolkata, is one of the largest dedicated Christmas carnivals in India. The themed lighting starts from St Xavier's College and ends at Jawaharlal Nehru Road. This has been extended in recent years at both ends: up to the Mullick Bazar crossing on Park Street, and up to St Paul's Cathedral on Cathedral Road, an offshoot of Jawaharlal Nehru Road. Another offshoot of celebrations and lighting has been extended to Vardaan Market on Camac Street. This themed lighting is designed by artisans from the nearby town of Chandannagar.

Bands and various choir groups perform on the stage at Allen Park on Park Street. A two-hour Christmas Parade is also organised on one of the days in which about 500 school children participate.

== Inception ==
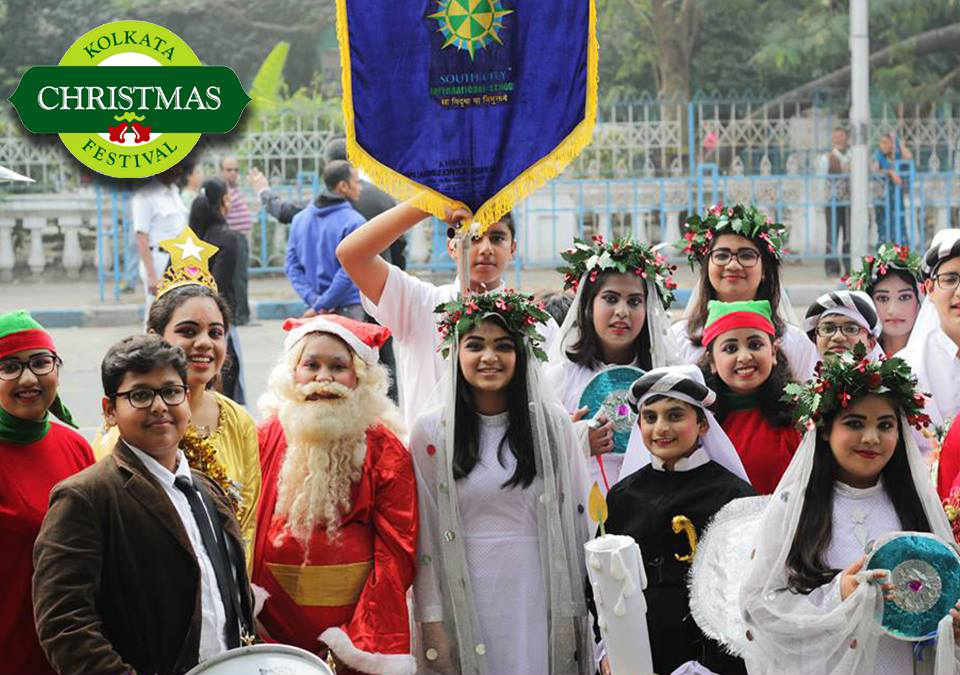
The group of students from South City International School at the Christmas Parade on Park Street during the Kolkata Christmas Festival (KCF) in 2016

The Kolkata Christmas Festival (KCF) was started in 2011 by the Tourism Department of the Government of West Bengal, in association with the Christian community.

It was conceptualised by Mamata Banerjee, the Chief Minister of West Bengal. This festival is a result of the combined efforts of the West Bengal Government, Kolkata Municipal Corporation, Kolkata Police, and a few private organisations.

== The festival ==
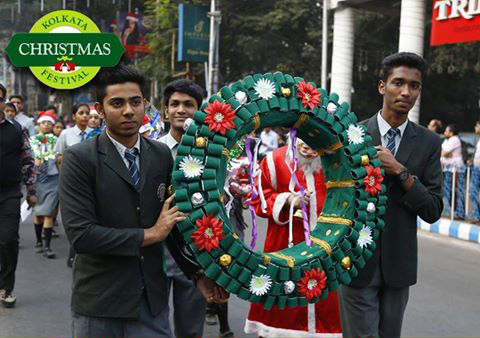
Christmas Parade by students at the 2016 Kolkata Christmas Festival

Kolkata Christmas Festival is held in December (from December 22 to December 30 in 2017). It initially spanned just the period around Christmas Day but has since been extended.

The festival is hosted at Allen Park on Park Street (renamed Mother Teresa Sarani). Park Street is turned into a walk-only zone during Christmas and New Year's eves. Allen Park is the nucleus of the carnival where the live music performances take place.

The choir of Dr Graham's Homes School from Kalimpong, Calcutta Symphony Orchestra from the Calcutta School of Music and choirs have performed at the KCF. Usha Uthup, Barefoot, Krosswindz, Orient Express have performed live at KCF over the years.

A large Christmas tree is placed near Mother Teresa's statue at the Park Street-Camac Street crossing. Park Street becomes a pedestrian street on Christmas Eve, Christmas Day, New Year's Eve and New Year's Day.

== See also ==
- List of Christmas and holiday season parades

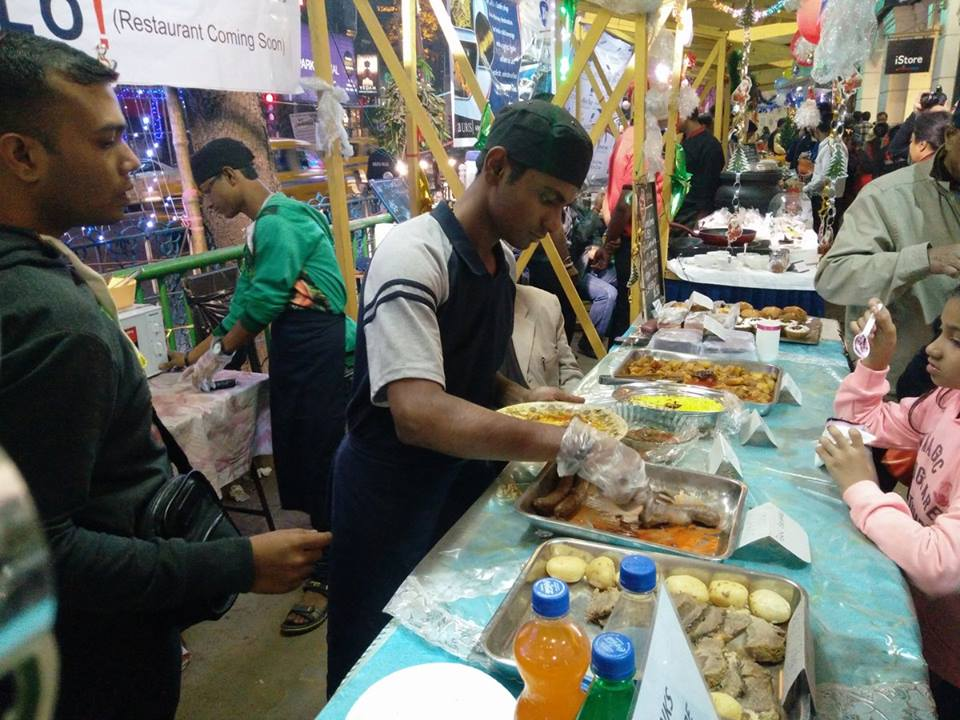
Food stall at the 2016 Kolkata Christmas Festival
