= Rome Christmas Parade =

Annual parade in Rome, Georgia, USA

Coordinates: 34°15′7″N 85°10′32″W

The Rome Christmas Parade is an annual parade that is held in Rome, Georgia. The procession lines up down Glenn Milner Boulevard onto East First Avenue and begins at Broad St and E1st Ave, and ends on Broad Street at 6th Avenue, in front of City Hall. Thousands of Georgians come to the parade yearly to see the parade participants such as: local high school bands, vintage automobiles, church and club floats pulled by tractors, law enforcement and rescue vehicles and Santa Claus. The Rome Christmas Parade has been a tradition in Rome for many decades.

Rome's Christmas parade is the oldest and largest Christmas parade in Georgia dating from 1950. This Christmas celebration is a non-commercial and non-profit event organized by local citizens. Hundreds of participants enter the parade each year: some walking groups waving to onlookers, others riding on floats, beauty pageant winners atop convertible cars, and even emergency vehicles driven by local law enforcement and rescue personnel. The floats are required to be decorated to match the parade's theme for that year, selected by a group of local citizens.

There are a few rules that govern the parade such as: horses having to wear diapers and no candy being thrown out to the crowd. Santa Claus is always on the last float in the parade.

The 2018 Christmas parade theme was "The King is Born".

The parade was moved in 2020 to Braves Blvd where the entries remained stable and the viewers drove by to view them. This was the only time the parade was moved and it was due to Covid.
