= Santa Claus parade =

Christmas and holiday season parade

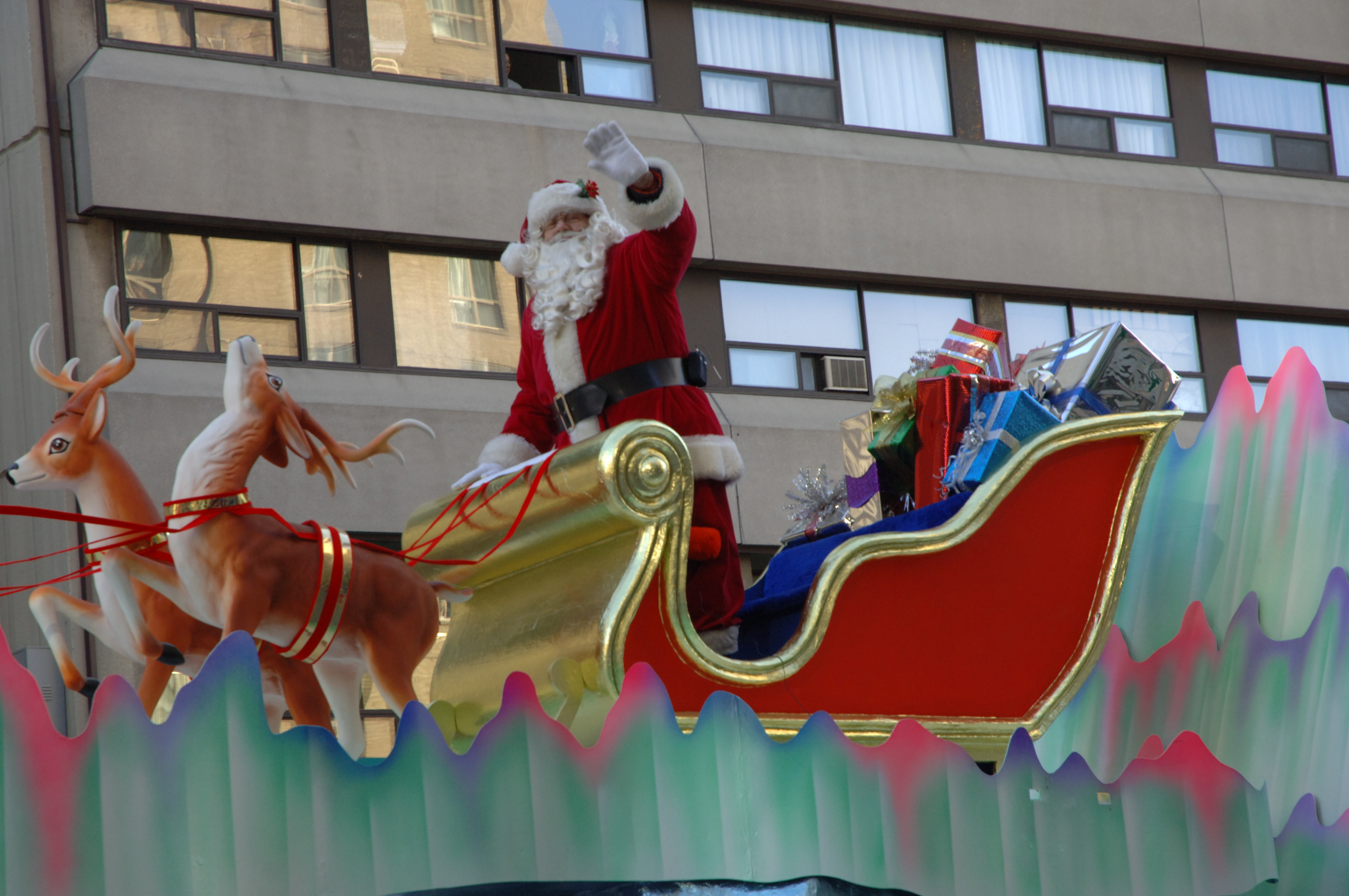
Toronto Santa Claus Parade, one of the largest in the world, in 2007

Santa Claus parades, also called Christmas parades, are parades held in some countries to celebrate the official opening of the Christmas season with the arrival of Santa Claus who always appears in the last float. The parades usually include themed floats, dancing or marching groups and bands playing Christmas songs. They are moving pageants that typically end near the centre of a city. Often sponsored by department stores, they may reinforce the store's brand recognition during the important Christmas shopping season.

== History ==
A rocket ship float with Santa Claus during a Christmas parade in Los Angeles, 1940

The Christmas parade is a direct descendant of late Medieval and Renaissance revivals of Roman Triumphs, which had music and banners, wagons filled with the spoils of war, and climaxed with the dux riding in a chariot, preferably drawn by two horses, and thus called the biga. (A quadriga such as surmounts the Brandenburg Gate is drawn by four horses.) Similarly, the climax of a Santa Claus parade is always Santa in his sleigh, drawn by eight reindeer (an octigia). Roman Triumphs were themselves consciously modeled on ceremonies honoring the gods. The Santa Claus parade directly corresponds to the modern triumphal entry of Santa Claus.

== Notable parades ==
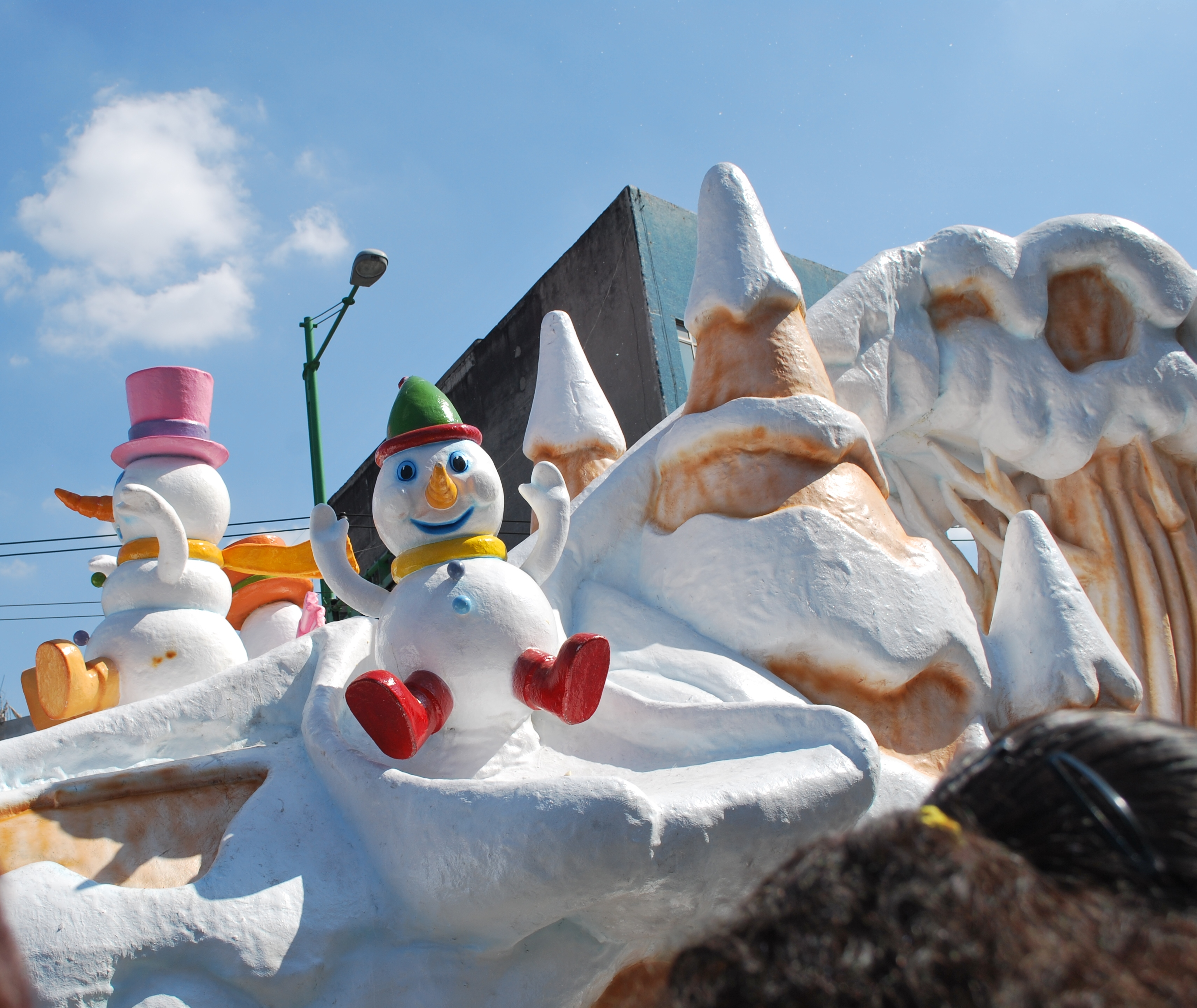
Float at the 2011 Christmas parade in Mexico City

Santa Claus parades are most common in North America.

One of the largest is the Toronto Santa Claus Parade, held annually in mid-November in Toronto, started in 1905 by the Eaton's department store. That year Santa arrived on a train and met Mr. and Mrs. Timothy Eaton, then walked to the Eaton's Downtown store. The first float was introduced in 1908 and consisted of one truck with a band to accompany Santa. The parade now has over 24 floats, 24 bands, and 1,700 participants, and is broadcast in several countries.

Peoria, Illinois has the longest running Santa Claus Parade in the U.S. The parade celebrated its 131st edition on November 23, 2018. The first parade in 1887 consisted of boats and derricks sailing down the river as part of the new bridge construction. In 1888, Peoria held a parade through town, celebrating the completion of the new Upper Free Bridge. The following December, Frederick Block of the Schipper and Block Department Store (later Block & Kuhl's) sponsored a parade that followed the same route and featured Santa Claus. This created the concept of a department-store parade that was later emulated in larger cities. Various attractions in the parade through the years included fireworks, circus wagons, a calliope, live reindeer and numerous parade floats. The parade was first televised in 1958.

In Vancouver, the Santa Claus Parade, originally sponsored by Rogers, and later Telus, has also grown to be one of the largest, with 65 floats and bands. A special train also circulates through the parade, collecting donations for the Greater Vancouver Food Bank and the Lower Mainland Christmas Bureau. In 2005, the parade collected over 4,300 kg (9,500 lb) of food and 2,300 toy donations. The last parade occurred in 2019, with the COVID-19 pandemic, followed by lack of sponsorship, leading to its cancellation.

Houston, Texas hosts the H-E-B Thanksgiving Day Parade annually since 1950. The previous sponsor was Foley's, until Macy's bought it.

Gimbels Department Store in Philadelphia started its parade in 1920. The parade is now known as the 6abc Dunkin' Donuts Thanksgiving Day Parade and was formerly sponsored by IKEA and Boscov's. It is the oldest parade in the United States held on Thanksgiving Day as the older parade in Peoria is held the day after.

In New York City, the Macy's Thanksgiving Day Parade, famous for its giant helium-filled balloons, began in 1924, inspired by the Eaton's parade in Toronto, with Macy's employees in costume, and— a distinctively Roman touch— animals borrowed from the Central Park Zoo. The giant balloons made an early appearance, with Felix the Cat in 1927. The inflation of the balloons in the streets flanking the American Museum of Natural History the night before has become a traditional gathering for New York's Upper West Side.

Also in 1924, the J. L. Hudson Company staged its first Thanksgiving Parade in Detroit, Michigan. Among the early features were large papier-mâché heads similar to those seen by Hudson's display director, Charles Wendel, on a recent trip to Viareggio, Italy. The heads continue to be a feature in the annual event. Hudson's sponsored the parade until 1979 when it was turned over to a non-profit group. In 1983, it became the Michigan Thanksgiving Parade and is currently known as America's Thanksgiving Parade.

Grand Rapids, Michigan's annual Santa Claus parade, known today as the Art Van Santa Parade, made history in 1971 when it became the first parade to end with the arrival of an African-American Santa Claus.

The Hollywood Christmas Parade (formerly The Santa Claus Lane Parade) in Southern California is a seasonal tradition that somewhat competes with the Tournament of Roses Parade and the Doo Dah Parade. Gene Autry wrote the well known Christmas song "Here Comes Santa Claus" after hearing children on the Santa Claus Lane Parade route yelling "Here Comes Santa Claus!" upon glimpsing Santa in the distance.

As part of its citywide Christmas celebrations, known as Gran Festival Navideño, Mexico City holds a parade on Eje Central. The 2011 version featured mobile machines that blew artificial snow on participants and spectators. This parade has been telecast on the Televisa and Azteca networks, with Televisa's coverage being the official coverage and being the most-widely aired coverage, being broadcast in other Spanish-speaking countries and on Galavision in the United States.

Elsewhere, especially in Commonwealth countries outside Canada, Santa Claus parades are sometimes known as Christmas pageants. The largest is the Adelaide Christmas Pageant, which was begun in 1933 and is held annually in November. In New Zealand most main centres have a Santa Parade, with many held since the early 20th century. Early New Zealand parades often had Santa arrive by unusual means, including on an elephant, by plane, and by parachute.

== See also ==
- List of Christmas and holiday season parades
- Santa's Grotto – a faux cavern (typically in a department store) where an actor portraying Santa Claus would give gifts to children
- SantaCon – an annual pub crawl of people dressed in cheap Santa suits
- Cavalcade of Magi – a parade with floats carrying portrayals of the Biblical magi
