= White Pines, California =

Unincorporated community in California, United States

White Pines
- Unincorporated community
- Location in California White Pines (the United States)
- Coordinates: 38°15′58″N 120°20′27″W
- Country: United States
- State: California
- County: Calaveras
- Elevation: 3,907 ft (1,191 m)

White Pines is an unincorporated community in Calaveras County, California, United States. It lies at an elevation of 3907 feet (1191 m). White Pines was the site of a lumber mill completed in 1940. The White Pines mill closed due to exhaustion of the local timber in 1962. White Pines Lake was constructed in 1970, after which time White Pines became a recreational community.

A post office operated in White Pines from 1940 to 1975.
