= University of New Hampshire Wildcat Marching Band =

College marching band in Durham, New Hampshire

Wildcat Marching Band
- School: University of New Hampshire
- Location: Durham, New Hampshire, U.S.
- Conference: CAA
- Director: Casey M. Speed
- Members: 90–110

The University of New Hampshire Wildcat Marching Band (UNHWMB or WMB), is the official marching band of the University of New Hampshire. The WMB plays at home games of the Wildcat football team, typically one away game per season, the Dover and Salem band shows, and various parades across New England. The band has traditionally had an equal mix of music and non-music majors and claims to have an average GPA consistently above the university's average. The WMB usually marches 90 to 110 members, depending on the year. Its largest roster in the past decade was approximately 125.

In 2001, the WMB was invited to perform for Prince Rainier in Monaco as part of a nine-day tour through Italy and France.

== Performance style and instrumentation ==
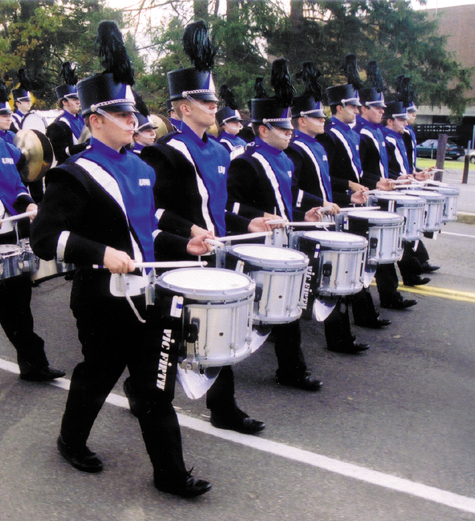
2002–2003 WMB snareline during the traditional pregame march to Cowell Stadium

The UNH Wildcat Marching Band is a corps-style band, which means it employs drill techniques taken from the tradition of Drum Corps International (DCI), and has in some capacity since 1991. The WMB's instrumentation comprises piccolos, flutes, clarinets, saxophones (alto and tenor, occasionally also baritone), trumpets, mellophones, trombones, marching baritones, sousaphones, and a battery consisting of snare, tenors (sextet), and 5 pitched bass drums, as well as cymbals. The WMB also uses a pit (front ensemble). The WMB also fields a color guard that primarily uses flags, but sabres and rifles are often used in feature. A featured twirler is sometimes also used.

== Organization ==
=== Directors ===
The director of the UNH Wildcat Marching Band is Casey Speed, a UNH alumna and former WMB Drum Major and Graduate Assistant. As Director of Athletic Bands, Speed is also the director of the Beast of the East Pep Band, a separate organization that performs for men's and women's ice hockey and basketball games, and the UNH Concert Band. She also teaches undergraduate courses in the areas of conducting and music education. Prior to her appointment at UNH, Speed was the Director of Instrumental Music at Marshwood High School in South Berwick, ME.

==== Recent directors ====
- 2006–Present Casey Speed
- 2003–2006 Erika Svanoe
- 1998–2003 Thomas Keck
- 1997–1998 Jeff Bolduc
- 1987–1997 Christopher Humphrey
- 1983–1987 Bill Reeve
- 1982–1983 Larry Lang
- 1965–1979 Stanley Hettinger
- 1961–1964 Donald Mattran
- 1959–1961 Allan Owen

=== Instructors and graduate assistants ===
Working directly under the director are a Percussion Instructor and a Color Guard Instructor. In addition, the Wildcat Marching Band typically fields a staff of Graduate assistants — graduate students from the UNH Department of Music — who help as drill technicians, arrange music for halftime shows, and assist with rehearsals and performances.

=== Student leadership ===
The WMB has traditionally fielded three Drum Majors of equal rank. However, for the 2012 season, there will be a designated "head" drum major, who will conduct the band from center podium during halftime shows, while one or two "assistant" drum majors will take turns on center podium for pre-game ceremonies and other special events. Additionally, each section has one or two Section Leaders, who are responsible for teaching music, running warm-up and drill block sessions, and generally serving as an example to the rest of their section.

=== WMB Council ===
The WMB Council was formed in 2007, made up of the student leaders and three at-large members. The WMB Council is responsible for assisting with recruiting, events, organization, alumni relations, and band camp. The members also serve as a representative voice for the general membership of the WMB.

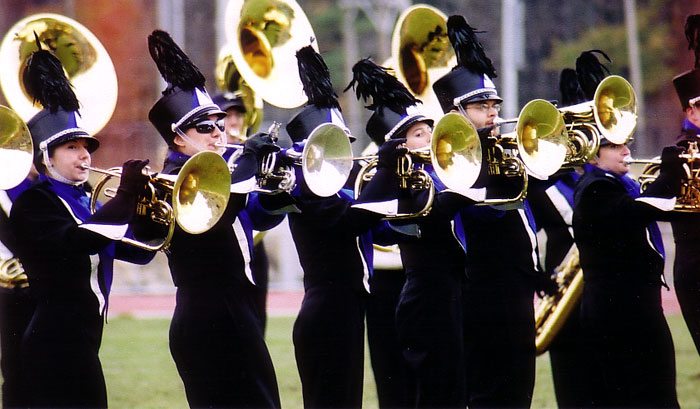
2002–2003 UNHWMB brass during a halftime performance at Cowell Stadium

== Trivia ==
- The UNHWMB began as an offshoot of the ROTC in the early 1900s and became part of the Department of Music later on. Because no official records were kept, the exact date remains unknown.
- Chuck Winfield of Blood, Sweat & Tears was a guest soloist on the UNHWMB recording of the 1986 BS&T halftime show.
- In the late 1960s, Arthur Fiedler was a guest conductor for UNH Band Day.
- Stanley Hettinger first introduced the Corps style of marching at UNH in 1991. Prior to that UNH had used the Big Ten style complete with high stepping and 270 degree turns, but brought the former style back for one more game in 2006, at Northwestern in Evanston, Illinois. New Hampshire won 34-17.
- In 1971, there was no UNH Marching Band due to funding issues
- The UNHWMB marched a halftime show at a New York Giants game in 1985.
- The UNHWMB performed at a Montreal Alouettes game in November 2000.
- The UNHWMB performed for Rainier III, Prince of Monaco in December 2001.
- The band marched at Walt Disney World's "Magic Kingdom" on December 31, 2009.

== See also ==
- UNH Wind Symphony
- UNH Symphonic Band
