= Dan Ashley =

American journalist

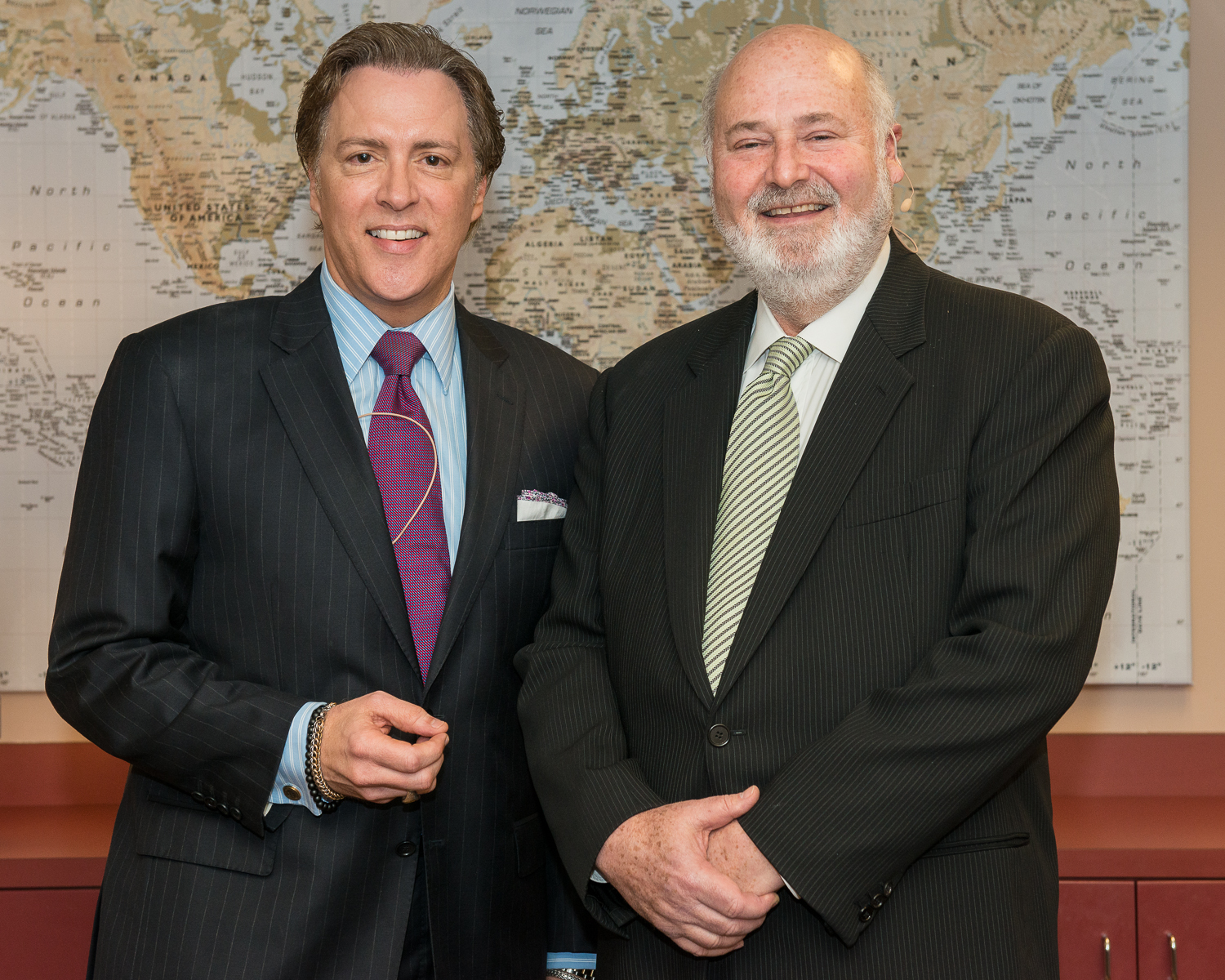
- Rob Reiner (right) poses with Dan Ashley (left) before they head to the stage of The Commonwealth Club of California, February 2013
- Born: August 29, 1963 (age 63); Chapel Hill, North Carolina
- Citizenship: United States
- Education: University of North Carolina
- Occupations: TV News Anchor/Reporter, Broadcaster, Journalist, Singer, Musician
- Years active: 1986–present
- Employer(s): KGO-TV (ABC7), San Francisco
- Known for: What Really Matters, Investigative Reporting

Dan Ashley is an American journalist. He graduated from the University of North Carolina in 1985 with degrees in English and Speech Communication. He is an anchor of ABC7 (KGO-TV) San Francisco Bay Area News.

Ashley came to ABC7 in 1995 as the weekday 5:00 p.m. news anchor and investigative reporter. One year later, in 1996, he was promoted to the anchor of the 6:00 and 11:00 broadcasts in addition to the 5:00 newscast.

== Career as a journalist ==
In June 1996, Ashley replaced anchor Richard Brown on the 6 & 11pm news broadcasts.

In February 2013, Ashley was given an inside look at the White House while there for a 1-on-1 interview With President Barack Obama.

Other notable interviews conducted by Ashley include George W. Bush, General Colin Powell, Rob Reiner, Tom Brokaw, Rahm Emanuel, and Ben Carson.

Ashley is the longest-tenured main male news anchor in the history of ABC7 (KGO-TV) in San Francisco.

When Hurricane Hugo struck Charleston, SC in 1989, Ashley was the last broadcaster to remain on the air covering the events.

In 2005, he reported from Poland on the March of the Living with Bay Area holocaust survivors.

=== Awards ===
During his news tenure in Charleston, Ashley received the prestigious DuPont Columbia and the Edward R. Murrow Awards.

In 2015, Ashley was inducted into the Silver Circle of the National Academy of Television Arts & Sciences San Francisco/Northern California Chapter .

Ashley has won numerous Emmy Awards for his reporting, anchoring, and producing as well as a National Emmy Nomination for reporting.

== Philanthropy ==
Friends of Camp Concord (FOCC) is a nonprofit organization dedicated to supporting Camp Concord, located in South Lake Tahoe. Ashley is on the board of directors and hosts an annual golf tournament fundraiser for the group.

Dan Ashley's Rock The CASA is an annual benefit concert to raise funding and awareness for both CASA of Contra Costa County and Friends of Camp Concord.

In 2015, Ashley became the Chairman of the board of directors for Music In Schools Today (MUST) He also serves on the boards of the Bay Area American Red Cross, Court Appointed Special Advocates (CASA) of Contra Costa County, and the Commonwealth Club of California.

In 2023, Dan was elected to the Board of Visitors for the University of North Carolina at Chapel Hill, his alma mater and hometown.

== Personal life ==
Ashley is a singer/songwriter who leads his own Americana/Rock band whose members include widely recognized and accomplished touring musicians.

Ashley was once a figure skating instructor.

Ashley is married to his wife, Angela, and has two grown sons and three grown stepsons.
