= Doug McConnell =

American journalist (1945–2026)

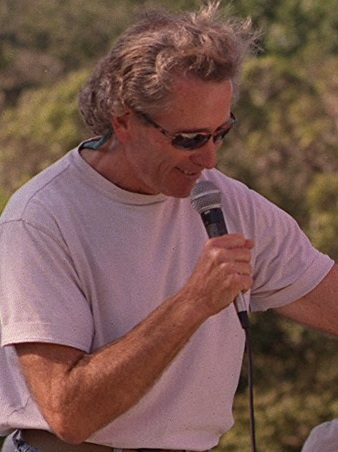
- McConnell in 2002
- Born: Douglas Gene McConnell; April 30, 1945; Santa Monica, California, U.S.
- Died: January 13, 2026 (aged 80); San Geronimo, California, U.S.
- Education: Pomona College (BSc, 1967); Eagleton Institute of Politics (MSc, 1968)
- Occupation: Television journalist
- Years active: 1982–2026
- Children: 2
- Awards: Iris Award; Gabriel Award

Douglas Gene McConnell (April 30, 1945 – January 13, 2026) was an American television journalist who focused on environmental issues, with programs on the air continuously from 1982. He created, produced and hosted many series, special programs, and news projects for local, national and international distribution. His broadcast awards include multiple Emmys, an Iris, and a Gabriel.

McConnell was co-founder and managing partner of ConvergenceMedia Productions (CMP) in Sausalito, California. One of CMP's principal products is OpenRoad with Doug McConnell, Exploring the West for Public Television nationally. OpenRoad on Public Television is closely linked to OpenRoad.tv, The Traveler's Video Guide to the West. McConnell was co-executive producer and managing editor for both ventures. McConnell also developed and oversaw other media projects undertaken by CMP.

From 1993 to 2009, McConnell was the host and senior editor of the Bay Area Backroads television series on KRON in the San Francisco Bay Area. Bay Area Backroads was one of the longest-running regional television series in American broadcast history, and was consistently the highest-rated locally produced, non-news program in the nation's sixth-largest market. During his Backroads years, McConnell co-authored two best-selling travel publications for Chronicle Books.

== Life and career ==
McConnell was born in Santa Monica on April 30, 1945. He received a bachelor's degree in government from Pomona College (1967), and a master's degree in political science from the Eagleton Institute of Politics at Rutgers University (1968).

From 1983, McConnell lived in the San Francisco Bay Area with his wife, two children, and a bevy of pets. He maintained a schedule of community activities, including serving on the advisory board of the local environmental watchdog San Francisco Baykeeper, and was honored by the Marin Humane Society as "Humanitarian of the Year," by the San Francisco Bay Trail Project as "Volunteer of the Year," by California State Parks as "Honorary Ranger of the Year," and by the National Park Service as "Honorary National Park Ranger." McConnell received many regional Emmys and other broadcast awards during his long career in television. In addition, McConnell was given the Harold Gilliam Award for environmental reporting and storytelling in Northern California.

Beyond his television work, McConnell managed significant communications programs for the President's Commission on Coal, the Governor of Alaska, the University of Alaska, the Institute of Ecology, the Gordon and Betty Moore Foundation, among many other institutions.

One of McConnell's later ventures was the creation of an online travel community called "OpenRoad.tv – The Traveler's Video Guide to the American West". OpenRoad.tv will be stocked with all the video, imagery and information that McConnell compiled over the years and continued to collect.

McConnell died in San Geronimo on January 13, 2026, at the age of 80. He had been struggling with health complications stemming from a stroke he suffered in 2023.

== Television programs ==
=== OpenRoad with Doug McConnell, Exploring the West ===
OpenRoad with Doug McConnell, Exploring the West began on San Francisco Public Television station KQED and its sister station in San Jose, KTEH, in April 2009.

=== Bay Area Backroads ===
The Bay Area Backroads program aired for 23 years in the San Francisco Bay Area, from 1985 until 2008.

In 1985, Jerry Graham (born Gerald Granowsky in Indianapolis) a former TV announcer, WNEW-FM employee, WGRG co-owner, KSAN general manager (1975–1977), and KPIX "Pacific Currents" show host, was cast by Bob Klein, KRON Executive Producer, who developed the travel show for locals, as "Bay Area Backroads". Its first segment profiled, by Jerry Graham, a local eccentric who carved tiki statues in his front yard. At age 60, Graham retired and moved to Santa Cruz.

In 1993, McConnell was hired to complete the 1993 season after Graham's retirement, and remained as host for 15 years, until 2008. The show's theme was to highlight offbeat individuals from the Bay Area, creating the impression that the production crew was simply encountering them on a recreational driving tour (when in fact, there was a small research team that had planned every show).

- Graham, Jerry (1990). Jerry Graham's Bay Area backroads (1st, rev. and updated ed.). New York: Perennial Library. ISBN 9780060964702.
- Graham, Jerry (1994). Jerry Graham's complete Bay Area backroads (1st ed.). New York, NY: HarperPerennial. ISBN 978-0-06-273238-5.
- McConnell, Doug (1999). Bay Area back roads (1st ed.). San Francisco: Chronicle Books. ISBN 9780811820912.

=== Other programs ===
In addition to Bay Area Backroads, McConnell's television programs included:

- Mac and Mutley, producer and host, KPIX-TV, Discovery Channel USA, Discovery International, and Westinghouse International
- The Adventurers, host, Discovery USA and Discovery International
- Wild Things, host, Discovery USA
- Wild Guide, narrator, Westinghouse International and Discovery's Animal Planet Channel
- Petline, co-host, Discovery's Animal Planet Channel
- Preview Vacation Bargains, co-host, NBC stations in eight cities
- Pacific Currents, producer and host, KPIX-TV
- KING 5 Magazine, producer and reporter, KING-TV in Seattle

McConnell's national specials and mini-series include:

- Discoveries of a Lost Voyage, co-host, Discovery USA
- Secrets of Alcatraz, producer and host, Discovery USA
- Secrets of Alcatraz: Return to the Rock, producer and host, PBS
- Secrets of the Gold Rush, producer and host, PBS
- Secrets of the Wine Country, producer and host, PBS
- Big Cat Tales, host, Discovery USA
- Prime Time Primates, host, Discovery USA
- The Crusaders, Pilot, producer and reporter, Buena Vista Television
