= Lives of Style =

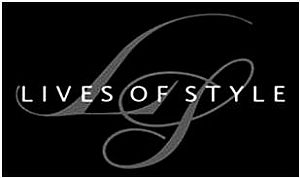
- "The Best of the Best of Fashion, Runway, Beauty, and Style"
- Created by: Elisabeth Laurence, Erin Laurence
- Presented by: Elisabeth Laurence
- Country of origin: United States
- No. of episodes: 5

Production
- Running time: 30 minutes/Weekly

Original release
- Network: KRON 4 KCAL 9
- Release: 2010 – present

Lives of Style, is a broadcast television and newsmagazine show that features the "best of the best" celebrity style, fashion, beauty and lifestyle in the world. It airs on TV stations on the West Coast of the United States.

The show reports on New York, Paris, Milan, and London fashion weeks, the Academy Awards, the Golden Globes, the Emmys, Hollywood Premieres, Fashion's Night Out, Concours d’Elegance, Napa Wine Auction and the Cannes Film Festival.

The show features backstage and behind-the-scenes interviews with celebrities, TV personalities, designers, make-up artists, models, leaders and innovators and covers pop culture and lifestyle.

Elisabeth Laurence, the creator of Lives of Style, is also the host on the show which airs on KCAL 9 in Los Angeles and KRON 4 in San Francisco.

The show first aired in San Francisco, then Los Angeles, will launch in New York City and Miami in Winter 2012 and then go national in late 2012.

== Celebrity Interviews ==
Lives of Style's episodes features behind-the-scenes of fashion shows and events, as well as interviews with designers, make-up artists, fashion insiders, and celebrities. Elisabeth has also interviewed jewelers, luxury automobile representatives, as well as owners of impressive homes and estates.

== The Last Word ==
Lives of Style's The Last Word is a blog that provides news on fashion, celebrities, designers, and makeup. Lives of style enlisted Michael Canale to write a weekly column, sharing tips and expertise he uses for his celebrity clients.

The Last Word features articles from Relationship Expert Dr. Pat Allen. http://livesofstyle.com/thelastword/?p=6230 Dr. Pat Allen talks about how to magnetize men, dating how-to's and do's and don't's.
