= KGO-TV =

Television station in San Francisco

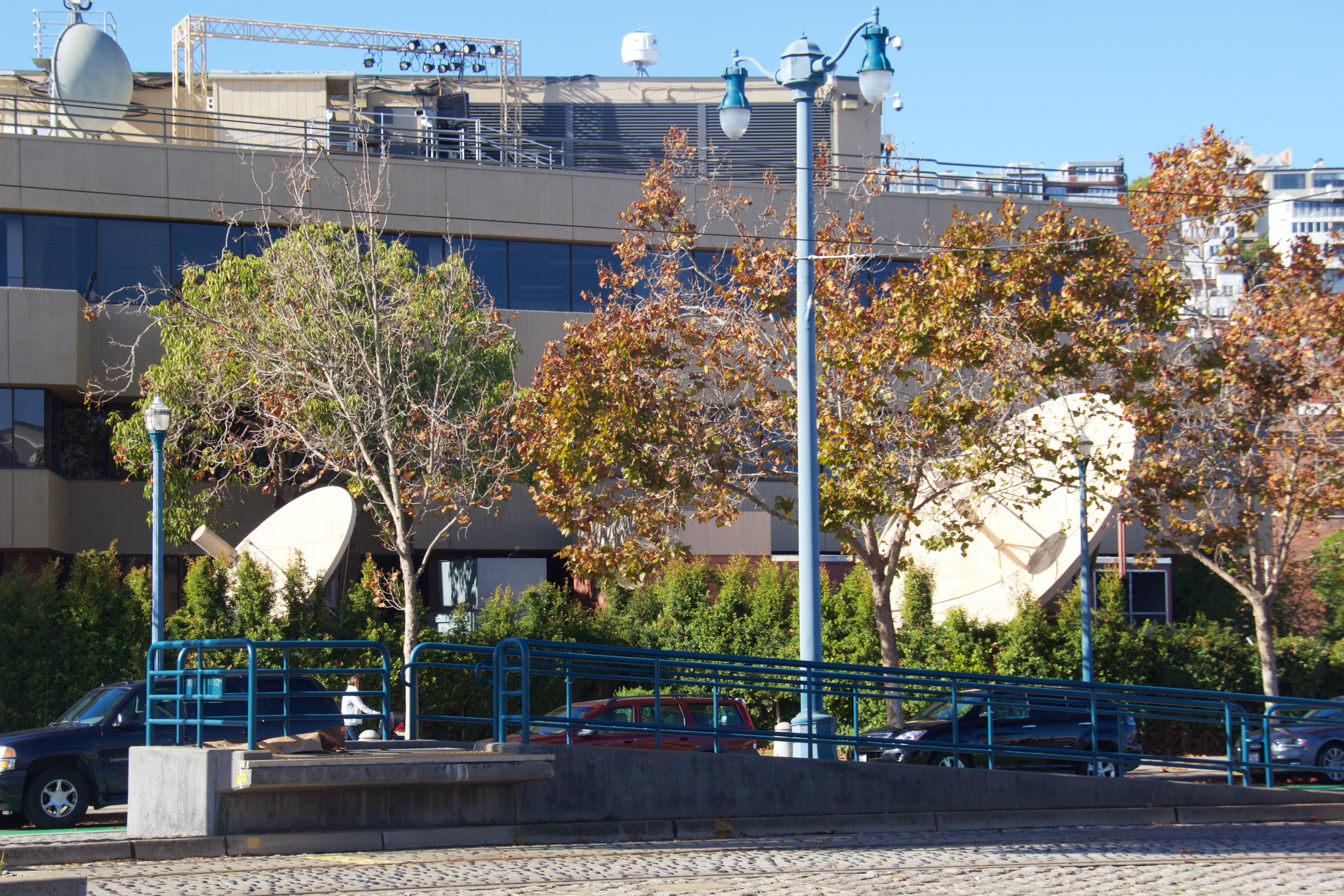
- Satellite antennas outside the KGO studios in San Francisco
- San Francisco–Oakland–San Jose, California; United States
- City: San Francisco, California
- Channels: Digital: 12 (VHF); Virtual: 7
- Branding: ABC 7; ABC 7 Eyewitness News

Programming
- Affiliations: 7.1: ABC; for others, see § Subchannels

Ownership
- Owner: ABC Owned Television Stations; (KGO Television, Inc.)

History
- First air date: May 5, 1949
- Former channel numbers: Analog: 7 (VHF, 1949–2009); Digital: 24 (UHF, 1998–2009), 7 (VHF, 2009–2020)
- Call sign meaning: General Electric Oakland (original owner and location of KGO radio)

Technical information
- Licensing authority: FCC
- Facility ID: 34470
- ERP: 47 kW
- HAAT: 520.5 m (1,708 ft)
- Transmitter coordinates: 37°45′19″N 122°27′10″W
- Translator(s): see § Translators

Links
- Public license information: Public file; LMS
- Website: abc7news.com

KGO-TV (channel 7) is a television station licensed to San Francisco, California, United States, serving the San Francisco Bay Area. It has been owned and operated by the ABC television network through its ABC Owned Television Stations division since the station's inception. KGO-TV's studios are located at the ABC Broadcast Center immediately west of The Embarcadero in the city's North Waterfront district, and its transmitter is located atop Sutro Tower. In addition, KGO-TV leases part of its building to CW outlet KRON-TV (channel 4, owned by Nexstar Media Group), but with completely separate operations.

== History ==
KGO-TV first signed on the air on May 5, 1949, as the San Francisco Bay Area's second-oldest television station, signing on five months after KPIX (channel 5) and the 50th in the United States. In fact, KPIX had a hand in getting KGO-TV on the air, as the CBS-affiliated station produced informational programming on how to receive and view ABC's channel 7. KGO-TV's original studios were located in the renovated Sutro Mansion near Mount Sutro in San Francisco, next to the transmitter tower it shared with KPIX.

KGO-TV was the fourth of ABC's five original owned-and-operated stations to sign on, after WABC-TV in New York City, WLS-TV in Chicago, and WXYZ-TV in Detroit, and before KABC-TV in Los Angeles. The call letters were inherited from KGO radio (810 AM). In addition to airing ABC programming, KGO-TV also aired syndicated programs from the Paramount Television Network; among the Paramount programs aired were Time For Beany, Hollywood Reel, Sandy Dreams, Hollywood Wrestling, and Cowboy G-Men.

Channel 7 had a limited broadcasting schedule during its first year on the air. It was not until September 1950 that the station announced, in the San Francisco Chronicle, that it would broadcast on all seven days of the week. For much of the 1950s, the station signed on late in the morning or early afternoon, especially on the weekends, because the ABC network did not offer many daytime programs then. For many years, Saturday programming began with King Norman's Kingdom of Toys, a popular children's program hosted by the owner of a San Francisco toy store, Norman Rosenberg, from 1954 until 1961. He died in December 2016 at the age of 98.

In 1954, KGO-TV moved to one of the most modern broadcasting facilities on the West Coast at the time, at 277 Golden Gate Avenue, formerly known as the Eagle Building. The building was demolished between 2010 and 2011 to make way for apartments. As an ABC-owned station, KGO-TV originated a few network daytime shows, including programs hosted by fitness expert Jack La Lanne, singer Tennessee Ernie Ford, and entertainer Gypsy Rose Lee. Syndicated game shows Oh My Word and The Anniversary Game were produced at KGO-TV by Circle Seven Productions. In the mid-1950s, KGO-TV telecast live weeknight variety shows hosted by Don Sherwood, a disc jockey for KSFO, until Sherwood was fired for making a political comment in defiance of a warning from station management. In September 1962, KGO began carrying ABC's first color program, the animated series The Jetsons, followed by The Flintstones. In the mid 1960s, KGO became the first Bay Area station to broadcast local programs in color, including its newscasts. In 1985, KGO-TV began broadcasting from its current studios at 900 Front Street, sharing the facility with radio stations KGO (AM 810), KSFO and KMKY (the former two are now owned by Cumulus Media).

By 2012, the radio stations had vacated 900 Front Street. In late 2014, KRON-TV (channel 4; then a primary MyNetworkTV affiliate) moved its operations from 1001 Van Ness Avenue, a building it had occupied since 1967, to the ABC Broadcast Center, leasing from KGO-TV/ABC the space on the third floor that had been occupied by the radio stations. KRON-TV, which became a CW owned-and-operated station in 2023, also uses one of the two studios on the first floor for production of its news programming.

=== KGO in the Salinas–Monterey–Santa Cruz market ===
In 1999, KGO-TV—seeking to gain advertising revenue in the South Bay—reached an agreement with the Granite Broadcasting Corporation, then-owner of San Jose's ABC affiliate KNTV to pay Granite to drop KNTV's ABC affiliation, resulting in KGO-TV becoming the network's exclusive Bay Area outlet. This resulted in the Salinas–Monterey–Santa Cruz market losing over-the-air reception of ABC programs since KNTV had also served those communities (the station temporarily affiliated with The WB, before replacing KRON-TV as the Bay Area's NBC affiliate in January 2002). In response, a cable-only ABC affiliate was set up for the areas affected, that simulcast KGO-TV's programming (including ABC programming and local newscasts), with the exception of programs that channel 7 was only allowed to show within the San Francisco market under syndication exclusivity rules. On December 20, 2010, Hearst Television, owners of NBC affiliate KSBW, signed an affiliation agreement with ABC to bring the network's programming to KSBW's second digital subchannel. The new subchannel (branded on-air as "Central Coast ABC") debuted on April 18, 2011, and took the pay-TV channel slots of KGO's market-only feed throughout California's Central Coast, with the latter wound down at the same time.

=== Logos ===
The Circle 7 logo, now in widespread use by ABC affiliates, was initially designed for KGO-TV in 1962. According to Broadcasting magazine, KGO unveiled this logo, created by San Francisco design consultant G. Dean Smith, on August 27, 1962. When the station incorporated ABC into its branding in the late 1990s (initially as "Channel 7 ABC" from 1996 to 1997, then as "ABC 7"), the station—along with several other ABC stations broadcasting on channel 7 that used the original version of the Circle 7 logo—simply attached the ABC logo to the Circle 7.

== Programming ==
The station carries a high-profile lineup of daytime programming with shows such as Live with Kelly and Mark, Tamron Hall, Jeopardy!, and Wheel of Fortune (the first two programs are distributed by the station's corporate cousin, Disney Media Distribution, while the latter two are produced by Sony Pictures Television and distributed by CBS Media Ventures). Jeopardy! and Wheel of Fortune have aired on KGO-TV since both shows moved to the station from KRON-TV in 1992. The Oprah Winfrey Show aired on KGO-TV throughout the program's tenure from 1986 to 2011. The station was among the handful of ABC affiliates to have aired the syndicated Who Wants to Be a Millionaire, first-run on the network, until the game show's cancellation in 2019. It also paired Donahue with Oprah on the station's afternoon lineup in the late 1980s, after the station acquired Donahue from KTVU; however, in January 1995, KGO-TV became the first affiliate in the country to drop the talk show, sixteen months before its cancellation in May 1996 (New York City's NBC O&O WNBC dropped Donahue during the summer of 1995 as well, even though the program originated from WNBC's studios at Rockefeller Center until being ousted and relocated to new studios in Manhattan to finish its final season).

KGO also airs the pre-show of the Academy Awards (which is produced by Los Angeles sister station KABC-TV). The station had sometimes aired the Bay to Breakers race during the 1980s, and the KGO Cure-a-thon with its radio partner, KGO-AM 810. KGO-TV was the first station to produce documentaries of the 1906 San Francisco earthquake and the 1989 Loma Prieta earthquake on April 8, 2006.

In the 1970s and 1980s, KGO-TV produced weekday talk/variety shows in the 9 to 10 am time slot following Good Morning America. A.M. San Francisco ran from 1975 to 1987/1988, when it was replaced by Good Morning, Bay Area, hosted by Susan Sikora. Hosts of A.M. San Francisco included the husband-and-wife team of Fred LaCosse and Terry Lowry (other ABC owned-and-operated stations produced their own A.M. programs in the 1980s; for example, A.M. Chicago at WLS-TV evolved into The Oprah Winfrey Show, and Live with Kelly and Mark evolved from a similar A.M. program on WABC). For a week or two in the summer of 1988, A.M. Los Angeles was simulcast on KGO-TV, with a few KGO-TV produced segments.

For most of its existence, KGO-TV was the only network-owned television station in the Bay Area, even throughout the time when ABC underwent ownership changes: Capital Cities Communications bought out ABC and merged with the network in 1985, the combined company Capital Cities/ABC was then sold to The Walt Disney Company in 1996. As such, the station did not heavily preempt network programming unlike its local competitors or its sister stations—such as Philadelphia's WPVI-TV, Houston's KTRK-TV and Fresno's KFSN-TV—which were known for doing so in those days (as of 2007, some exceptions to this policy may be made when breaking news events or selected ABC Sports programs warrant exclusive coverage). The distinction of being the Bay Area's only O&O station ended in 1995 when several other stations in the San Francisco-Oakland market became network-owned stations over the next twenty years—including KBHK-TV (now KPYX) becoming a charter member of UPN (in which the station's then-owner was a partner) in 1995, KPIX becoming a CBS O&O with the network's 1995 merger with Westinghouse, KNTV becoming an NBC O&O in 2002 after being bought by the network after it disaffiliated from KRON-TV, KTVU becoming a Fox O&O in 2015 after being acquired by the network alongside sister station KICU-TV a year prior (although KICU remains an independent station due to KRON-TV's affiliation with MyNetworkTV), and KRON-TV becoming a CW O&O after picking up the affiliation in 2024 following KBCW (now KPYX) and seven other CBS-owned stations disaffiliating with The CW. After ABC sold Detroit's WXYZ-TV to Scripps–Howard Broadcasting in 1986 as part of the Capital Cities/ABC merger, KGO-TV went on to be the longest-serving ABC O&O outside of New York, Los Angeles, and Chicago.

=== Sports programming ===
Owing to its common ownership with ESPN, Channel 7 holds the right of first refusal to Monday Night Football games involving the San Francisco 49ers. The station carried coverage of the 49ers' victories in Super Bowl XIX, which was played locally at Stanford Stadium, and Super Bowl XXIX. The station also carried coverage of the Oakland Raiders' appearance in Super Bowl XXXVII. Also, Channel 7 airs NBA on ABC contests involving the Golden State Warriors via the network's contract with the NBA and, since 2021, San Jose Sharks games through the network's contract with the NHL. KGO-TV has aired the Warriors' championship victories in the 2015, 2017, 2018, and 2022 NBA Finals and the Warriors' championship appearances in the 2016 and 2019 NBA Finals.

The station carried the 1989 World Series, a matchup between the Oakland Athletics and San Francisco Giants which would be interrupted by the Loma Prieta earthquake shortly before Game 3 was to begin at Candlestick Park.

=== The View from the Bay ===
From June 26, 2006, to September 10, 2010, KGO-TV broadcast a locally produced weekday variety show called The View from the Bay, hosted by Spencer Christian and Janelle Wang. The hour-long show focused on local attractions as well as interviews and other interests in the Bay Area. Aimed at female viewers, the show aired weekdays at 3 pm, and was also live-streamed online. Los Angeles sister station KABC-TV also aired the program weeknights at 10 pm on its second digital subchannel, with the program also airing at various times on digital subchannels of other ABC O&O stations. The program was also syndicated to the Live Well Network in 2010, retitled as Everyday Living.

=== 7 Live ===
The View from the Bay was replaced by a new local afternoon talk program called 7 Live on September 13, 2010 (which was similar in format to one of MSNBC's earliest programs, The Site), taking the former program's previous 3 pm time slot. The program was hosted by longtime KGO-AM radio host Brian Copeland and Lizzie Bermudez, who stood at a computerized podium and alternatively acted as "sidekick" or "sounding board" to Copeland and shared material from her computer; Bermudez focused on technology and pop culture segments. 7 Live had an innovative format with a studio audience called "The Voice Box" and viewer-submitter e-mail, Facebook, and Twitter comments that were read by the hosts during the program. Copeland spent most of the program walking about the studio, peppering his material with humorous comments. Each edition of 7 Live generally ended with Copeland sharing a "Thought of the Day".

Jennifer Jolly served as the technology/social media co-host from a computerized podium (on a par with Bermudez) from its premiere until August 2011, when she became a frequent technology and social media guest contributor for the now-defunct CBS morning news program, The Early Show. The program played off the "seven" theme by sometimes incorporating a seven-item list (referred to as "The List") into the program. 7 Live was canceled by KGO, due to low ratings, airing its last broadcast on April 27, 2012.

=== News operation ===
KGO-TV presently broadcasts 42 hours, 55 minutes of locally produced newscasts each week (with 6 hours, 35 minutes each weekday; six hours on Saturdays; and four hours on Sundays). The program usually rebroadcasts stories previously shown during the 6 pm newscast and national and international news reports from ABC News.

KGO-TV had followed the lead of its New York City sister station, WABC-TV, and adopted the Eyewitness News format for its newscasts in the late 1960s; however, the Eyewitness News title was already being used on KPIX-TV, which inherited its version of the format from its Philadelphia sister station KYW-TV. As a result, KGO-TV instead called its newscasts Channel 7 News Scene throughout the 1970s, and Channel 7 News from 1982 to 1998, when it switched to the current ABC 7 News branding. Along with the other ABC O&Os, KGO-TV also used an edited version of the "Tar Sequence" from the soundtrack of Cool Hand Luke as the theme music for its newscasts starting in 1969. After its Chicago sister station, WLS-TV, began to reuse the Eyewitness News branding in 2013, KGO-TV became the only ABC O&O that did not use the Eyewitness News or Action News brand for its newscasts, as with other ABC O&O stations.

The station broadcast a 4:30 pm newscast named Early News in 1970, anchored by Ray Tannehill and John Reed King, with Pete Giddings covering weather and Bob Fouts presenting sports. Lu Hurley provided live helicopter traffic coverage, one of the first television programs in the San Francisco Bay Area to offer traffic reports. KGO-TV was one of the last ABC affiliates that broadcast the network's evening news program in the 7 pm time slot. By early 1992, World News Tonight had been displaced to 5:30 pm, replacing the last half of the 5 pm news hour. KGO-TV has long broadcast an 11 pm newscast; it was originally a half-hour program before expanding to 35 minutes in the early 1990s. In the 2000s, a staple of the 11 pm. Sunday newscast was Richard Hart's segment about technological developments, alternatively titled "Next Step" and "Drive to Discover".

The station previously used the market's first helicopter equipped to shoot and transmit high definition video, branded as "Sky 7HD", which made its on-air debut in February 2006. Due to logistical and equipment limitations, video from the helicopter was only available in 4:3 standard definition at times (when this occurs, the helicopter is branded simply "Sky 7"). KGO became the second television station in the Bay Area (after KTVU) to begin broadcasting its local newscasts in high definition on February 17, 2007.

From January 8, 2007, until March 11, 2022, KGO-TV also produced an hour-long 9 pm newscast for independent station KOFY-TV (channel 20). On September 6, 2021, KOFY moved ABC 7 News from 7 to 8 pm. KGO aired its final news broadcast on KOFY on March 11, 2022, in anticipation of KOFY becoming a Grit affiliate and switching to western programming on April 16, 2022.

On July 20, 2007, longtime evening news anchor and KGO radio talk show host Pete Wilson died at age 62, following a massive heart attack that he suffered during a hip replacement procedure at Stanford University Medical Center in Palo Alto, California. The station aired extensive tributes to Wilson when his death was publicly announced the following day. His final newscast and radio show were on July 18, 2007.

In 2008, KGO became the first station in the market to start its early morning newscast before 5 am, with the expansion of its weekday morning program to 4:30 am. Around that same time and prompted by a sluggish economy and the station's conversion to the "Ignite" automated control room system, on May 26, 2011, KGO debuted an hour-long 4 pm newscast, which filled the timeslot formerly held by The Oprah Winfrey Show (which ended its 25-year syndication run the previous day). On September 10, 2011, KGO-TV expanded its weekend 11 pm newscasts to one hour.

On August 8, 2014, KGO announced a partnership with Univision O&O KDTV-DT to provide newsgathering resources to the station. It mirrors a similar partnership between Philadelphia sister station WPVI and WUVP-DT.

On July 9, 2015, KGO became the first station in Northern California to fly a commercial drone under newly approved FAA guidelines. Called "DroneView7", the aircraft flew over the demolition of Candlestick Park, broadcasting live. On February 4, 2022, the station launched ABC 7 Bay Area 24/7, a continuous online streaming channel showing local news and information.

On February 1, 2026, aided by KPIX having discontinued use of the branding in 2013, KGO rebranded its newscasts as ABC 7 Eyewitness News for the first time.

==== Notable current on–air staff ====
===== Anchors =====
- Dan Ashley
- Larry Beil
- Kristen Sze

===== On-air meteorologist =====
- Spencer Christian

==== Notable former on-air staff ====
- Jessica Aguirre – anchor
- Dr. Dean Edell – health reporter with "House Calls"
- Pete Giddings – meteorologist
- Roger Grimsby – anchor and news director
- Carolyn Johnson – anchor
- Vic Lee – reporter
- Dion Lim – anchor
- Christine Lund – reporter
- Dude Martin – host
- Bryan Norcross – meteorologist
- Maury Povich – anchor and host of AM San Francisco
- Pete Wilson – anchor
- Natasha Zouves – anchor

== Technical information ==
=== Subchannels ===
The station's signal is multiplexed:

Subchannels of KGO-TV
Subchannel	Res.	Short name	Programming
7.1	720p	KGO-HD	ABC
7.2	720p	LOCLish	Localish
7.3	480i	Charge	Charge!
7.4	480i	HSN	HSN
4.5	480i	Defy	Defy (KRON-TV)

Broadcast on behalf of another station

==== Localish ====
In May 2010, KGO-TV began carrying the Disney/ABC-owned Live Well HD (later Live Well Network, now Localish) on its second digital subchannel; KGO-TV also produces the cooking show Good Cookin' with Bruce Aidells for the network. In 2007, KGO was among the few commercial television stations in California that scheduled an alternative set of programs on a digital subchannel; at the time, the 7.2 subchannel ran simulcasts and rebroadcasts of most KGO newscasts and other locally produced programs, along with repeats of ABC News programs in non-traditional timeslots (for example, the weeknight editions of ABC World News Tonight aired at 7 pm, while Nightline aired most weekdays at 9 am and 7:30 pm). Some programs seen on channel 7.2, such as the Commonwealth Club Speaker's Luncheon and reruns of the 1960s ABC prime time western The Guns of Will Sonnett, were not shown on channel 7.1.

=== Analog-to-digital conversion ===
KGO-TV shut down its analog signal, over VHF channel 7, on June 12, 2009, as part of the federally mandated transition from analog to digital television. The station's digital signal relocated from its pre-transition UHF channel 24 to VHF channel 7. As a result, KGO-TV is the only Bay Area television station to retain the same channel allocation post-transition and the only other station alongside KNTV to remain on the VHF dial (KQED moved from VHF channel 9 to UHF channel 30). During the 2019 digital television repack, KGO-TV moved to VHF channel 12, while KRON-TV moved to VHF channel 7.

KGO-TV has a construction permit for a fill-in translator on UHF channel 35, serving the southern portion of the viewing area, including San Jose, for UHF antenna viewers, until the digital transition. It has since returned to RF channel 7, which is a VHF channel, therefore its reception can be difficult for people with UHF HDTV antennas.

=== Translators ===
- KGO-TV (DRT) 35 San Jose
- K21CD-D Ukiah

== See also ==
- Circle 7 logo
- KSFO
- KABC-TV
- WABC-TV
- WLS-TV
- List of three-letter broadcast call signs in the United States
