= Sigma Beta Delta =

International business management honor society

- ΣΒΔ
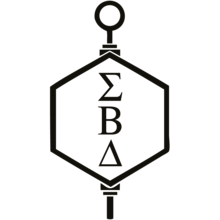
- Founded: January 16, 1994; 32 years ago La Jolla, California
- Type: Honor
- Affiliation: ACHS
- Status: Active
- Emphasis: Business and Administration
- Scope: International
- Motto: "Wisdom...Honor...Aspirations".
- Colors: Hunter green and Gold
- Publication: Aspirations
- Chapters: 378 active
- Members: 80,000 lifetime
- Headquarters: 3730 Grand Boulevard; Brookfield, Illinois 60513; United States
- Website: www.sigmabetadelta.org

Sigma Beta Delta (ΣΒΔ) is an international scholastic honor society that recognizes academic achievement among students in the fields of business, management, and administration. It was established in 1994 in La Jolla, California.

== History ==
Sigma Beta Delta was founded by Beta Gamma Sigma on January 16, 1994, in La Jolla, California. Beta Gamma Sigma, itself an honor society for students enrolled in AACSB-accredited business schools, formed Sigma Beta Delta to recognize the achievements of students at regionally accredited universities that lacked AACSB accreditation. Since its formation, Sigma Beta Delta has been considered the "sister" honor society of Beta Gamma Sigma. The organizations have many shared goals, including the promotion and recognition of scholarship in business-related fields of study.

Initially a small, U.S.-based honor society, Sigma Beta Delta's founding chapters were established in June 1994 at Belmont University, North Carolina State University, Morehouse College, McKendree College, and Southern University. Its first national executive council president was James H. Bearden of East Carolina University.

Sigma Beta Delta was admitted to the Association of College Honor Societies in 1994. By 2012, it had 378 active chapters and 6,312 active members.

In 2024, Sigma Beta Delta has chartered more than 400 chapters and has initiated more than 80,000 members. Its national headquarters is at 3730 Grand Boulevard in Brookfield, Illinois.

== Symbols ==
The Greek letters Sigma Beta Delta were selected to represent the Greek words Σοφια (honor), Βεβαοσ (honor), and Διωκω (pursuit of meaningful aspirations). The society's motto is "Wisdom...Honor...Aspirations".

Its colors are hunter green and gold. Its publication is called Aspirations.

== Membership ==
Eligibility for membership in Sigma Beta Delta applies to all students at a non-AACSB, regionally accredited school of business in the United States, who rank in the upper twenty percent of their undergraduate or graduate class. All students enrolled in a regionally accredited doctoral program in business are eligible to join the honor society upon graduation. Generally, undergraduate and graduate students must have completed at least half of their coursework to be considered for membership. An offer of membership, once accepted, is a lifetime distinction for high-achieving students of business programs. Membership is for life.

== Chapters ==
As of 2024, Sigma Beta Delta has chartered more than 400 chapters in the United States and abroad. Following is an incomplete list of chapters, with inactive institutions indicated in italics.

Chapter	Charter date	Location	Status	Ref.
McKendree University	1994	Lebanon, Illinois	Active	
Concordia University Irvine	1995	Irvine, California	Active	
Hilbert College	1995	Hamburg, New York	Active	
Spalding University	1995	Louisville, Kentucky	Active	
University of Holy Cross	1995	New Orleans, Louisiana	Active	
Austin Peay State University	1998	Clarksville, Tennessee	Active	
Cabrini University	1998	Radnor Township, Pennsylvania	Active	
Centenary College of Louisiana	1998	Shreveport, Louisiana	Active	
Chowan University	1998	Murfreesboro, North Carolina	Active	
Coe College	1998	Cedar Rapids, Iowa	Active	
East Texas Baptist University	1998	Marshall, Texas	Active	
Elmira College	1998	Elmira, New York	Active	
Emmanuel University	1998	Franklin Springs, Georgia	Active	
Hampton University	1998	Hampton, Virginia	Active	
Hartwick College	1998	Oneonta, New York	Active	
Hillsdale College	1998	Hillsdale, Michigan	Active	
Howard Payne University	1998	Brownwood, Texas	Active	
Huntingdon College	1998	Montgomery, Alabama	Active	
Husson University	1998	Bangor, Maine	Active	
Judson College	1998	Marion, Alabama	Inactive	(Note: Judson College closed in July 2021.)
Lees–McRae College	1998	Banner Elk, North Carolina	Active	
Liberty University	1998	Lynchburg, Virginia	Active	
Lincoln University	1998	Lincoln University, Pennsylvania	Active	
Marian University	1998	Fond du Lac, Wisconsin	Active	
Mount St. Joseph University	1998	Cincinnati, Ohio	Active	
Nova Southeastern University	1998	Fort Lauderdale, Florida	Active	
Ohio Wesleyan University	1998	Delaware, Ohio	Active	
Palm Beach Atlantic University	1998	West Palm Beach, Florida	Active	
Robert Morris University, Orland Park	1998	Orland Park, Illinois	Inactive	(Note: Robert Morris University's Orland Park campus moved to Aurora and became the DuPage Campus in 2001.)
Saint Elizabeth University	1998	Morristown, New Jersey	Active	
Saint Francis University	1998	Loretto, Pennsylvania	Active	
Salve Regina University	1998	Newport, Rhode Island	Active	
Thomas University	1998	Thomasville, Georgia	Active	
University of Mary Washington	1998	Fredericksburg, Virginia	Active	
University of Tennessee Southern	1998	Pulaski, Tennessee	Active	(Note: Chapter formed at Martin Methodist College, now the University of Tennessee Southern.)
Urbana University	1998	Urbana, Ohio	Inactive	(Note: Urbana University closed in 2020.)
Washington College	1998	Chestertown, Maryland	Active	
Williams Baptist University	1998	Walnut Ridge, Arkansas	Active	
Wilmington University	1998	New Castle, Delaware	Active	
California Lutheran University	1999	Thousand Oaks, California	Active	
Charleston Southern University	1999	Charleston, South Carolina	Active	
College of St. Joseph	1999	Rutland, Vermont	Active	
Concordia University Texas	1999	Austin, Texas	Active	
Dickinson College	1999	Carlisle, Pennsylvania	Active	
Dickinson State University	1999	Dickinson, North Dakota	Active	
Farmingdale State College	1999	East Farmingdale, New York	Active	
Hope College	1999	Holland, Michigan	Active	
Long Island University	1999	Brooklyn, New York	Active	
National University	1999	La Jolla, California	Active	
Nazareth University	1999	Pittsford, New York	Active	
Robert Morris University Illinois, Chicago	1999	Chicago, Illinois	Inactive	(Note: Robert Morris University Illinois merged with Roosevelt University in March 2020.)
Robert Morris University Illinois, Springfield	1999	Springfield, Illinois	Inactive	
Davis & Elkins College	2000	Elkins, West Virginia	Active	
Holy Names University	2000	Oakland, California	Inactive	(Note: Holy Names University closed in 2023.)
Marymount Manhattan College	2000	New York City, New York	Active	
Alliance University	2000	New York City, New York	Inactive	(Note: Chapter formed at Nyack College, which became Alliance University in 2022. The university closed in August 2023.)
Curry College School of Business and Technology	2000	Milton, Massachusetts	Active	
St. Norbert College	2000	De Pere, Wisconsin	Active	
Touro University	2000	Brooklyn, New York	Active	
Virginia Wesleyan University	2000	Virginia Beach, Virginia	Active	
Alaska Pacific University	2001	Anchorage, Alaska	Active	
California State University Maritime Academy	2001	Vallejo, California	Active	
Felician University	2001	Lodi, New Jersey	Active	
McKendree University, Louisville	2001	Louisville, Kentucky	Inactive	(Note: The Louisville campus closed in 2016.)
Mount Saint Mary's University, Los Angeles	2001	Los Angeles, California	Active	
Pacific Union College	2001	Angwin, California	Active	
State University of New York at Potsdam	2001	Potsdam, New York	Active	
Southwestern Adventist University	2001	Keene, Texas	Active	
Aquinas College	2002	Nashville, Tennessee	Active	
Buffalo State University	2002	Buffalo, New York	Active	
Franklin Pierce University	2002	Rindge, New Hampshire	Active	
Culver–Stockton College	2002	Canton, Missouri	Active	
Lynn University	2002	Boca Raton, Florida	Active	
Salem College	2002	Winston-Salem, North Carolina	Active	
Siena Heights University	2002	Adrian, Michigan	Active	
Sullivan University	2002	Louisville, Kentucky	Active	
University of Pikeville	2002	Pikeville, Kentucky	Active	
Westfield State University	2002	Westfield, Massachusetts	Active	
Berkeley College	2003	New York City, New York	Active	
Daemen University	2003	Amherst, New York	Active	
Penn State Scranton	2003	Dunmore, Pennsylvania	Active	
Reinhardt University	2003	Waleska, Georgia	Active	
Robert Morris University Illinois, Peoria	2003	Peoria, Illinois	Inactive	
Saint Michael's College	2003	Colchester, Vermont	Active	
Shorter University	2003	Atlanta, Georgia	Active	
Wayne State College	2003	Wayne, Nebraska	Active	
Aquinas College	2004	Grand Rapids, Michigan	Active	
Briarcliffe College, Bethpage Campus	2004	Bethpage, New York	Inactive	(Note: Briarcliffe College closed in 2018.)
Christian Brothers University	2004	Memphis, Tennessee	Active	
Endicott College	2004	Beverly, Massachusetts	Active	
Kentucky Wesleyan College	2004	Owensboro, Kentucky	Active	
Robert Morris University Illinois, Bensenville	2004	Bensenville, Illinois	Inactive	
Robert Morris University Illinois, DuPage	2004	Aurora, Illinois	Inactive	
St. Andrews University	2004	Laurinburg, North Carolina	Active	
University of Wisconsin–Green Bay	2004	Green Bay, Wisconsin	Active	
Walsh University	2004	North Canton, Ohio	Active	
Warner University	2004	Lake Wales, Florida	Active	
Wentworth Institute of Technology	2004	Boston, Massachusetts	Active	
Bellevue University	2005	Bellevue, Nebraska	Active	
Bryan College	2005	Dayton, Tennessee	Active	
Flagler College	2005	St. Augustine, Florida	Active	
Heritage University	2005	Toppenish, Washington	Active	
Hodges University	2005	Naples, Florida	Inactive	(Note: The Naples campus closed and consolidated with the Fort Myers campus in September 2021. The university closed in August 2024.)
Medaille University	2005	Williamsville, New York	Inactive	(Note: Medaille closed in August 2023.)
Molloy University	2005	Rockville Centre, New York	Active	
Montana Technological University	2005	Butte, Montana	Active	
Olivet Nazarene University	2005	Bourbonnais, Illinois	Active	
Rogers State University	2005	Claremore, Oklahoma	Active	
St. Petersburg College, Largo Campus	2005	Largo, Florida	Active	
Belhaven University	2006	Jackson, Mississippi	Active	
Brevard College	2006	Brevard, North Carolina	Active	
Bryant & Stratton College, Western New York	2006	Getzville, New York	Active	
Bushnell University	2006	Eugene, Oregon	Active	(Note: Chapter formed at Northwest Christian University, which became Bushnell University in 2020.)
Chestnut Hill College	2006	Philadelphia, Pennsylvania	Active	
Columbia College	2006	Columbia, Missouri	Active	
Keiser University	2006	Fort Lauderdale, Florida	Active	
University of the Cumberlands	2006	Williamsburg, Kentucky	Active	
Wayland Baptist University	2006	Plainview, Texas	Active	
Berkeley College	2007	Paramus, New Jersey	Active	
Bryant & Stratton College, Virginia Beach	2007	Virginia Beach, Virginia	Active	
Castleton University	2007	Castleton, Vermont	Active	
Cornerstone University	2007	Grand Rapids, Michigan	Active	
Daytona State College	2007	Daytona Beach, Florida	Active	
Emmanuel College	2007	Boston, Massachusetts	Active	
Kean University	2007	Union Township, New Jersey	Active	
Keuka College	2007	Keuka Park, New York	Active	
Mount Ida College	2007	Newton, Massachusetts	Inactive	(Note: The University of Massachusetts Amherst acquired Mount Ida College in 2018.)
Quincy University	2007	Quincy, Illinois	Active	
Schreiner University	2007	Kerrville, Texas	Active	
University of Saint Joseph	2007	West Hartford, Connecticut	Active	
Averett University	2008	Danville, Virginia	Active	
Bridgewater State University	2008	Bridgewater, Massachusetts	Active	
Capitol Technology University	2008	South Laurel, Maryland	Active	
College of the Ozarks	2008	Point Lookout, Missouri	Active	
College of Westchester	2008	White Plains, New York	Active	
Dominican University of California	2008	San Rafael, California	Active	
Edward Waters University	2008	Jacksonville, Florida	Active	
North Carolina Wesleyan University	2008	Rocky Mount, North Carolina	Active	
Penn State Lehigh Valley	2008	Center Valley, Pennsylvania	Active	
Saint Peter's University	2008	Jersey City, New Jersey	Active	
Shorter University	2008	Rome, Georgia	Active	
Sullivan University, Lexington Campus	2008	Lexington, Kentucky	Active	
Wesley College	2008	Dover, Delaware	Inactive	(Note: The college was acquired by Delaware State University in 2021.)
Worcester State University	2008	Worcester, Massachusetts	Active	
Bemidji State University	2009	Bemidji, Minnesota	Active	
Bethany College	2009	Lindsborg, Kansas	Active	
Carroll College	2009	Helena, Montana	Active	
Davenport University	2009	Grand Rapids, Michigan	Active	
East Stroudsburg University of Pennsylvania	2009	East Stroudsburg, Pennsylvania	Active	
Hamline University	2009	Saint Paul, Minnesota	Active	
Lehman College	2009	Bronx, New York	Active	
LeTourneau University	2009	Longview, Texas	Active	
Life University	2009	Marietta, Georgia	Active	
Mary Baldwin University	2009	Staunton, Virginia	Active	
Mid-America Christian University	2009	Oklahoma City, Oklahoma	Active	
Presbyterian College	2009	Clinton, South Carolina	Active	
Whittier College	2009	Whittier, California	Active	
Bryant & Stratton College	2010	Wauwatosa, Wisconsin	Active	
Misericordia University	2010	Dallas, Pennsylvania	Active	
Penn State Greater Allegheny	2010	McKeesport, Pennsylvania	Active	
William Carey University	2010	Hattiesburg, Mississippi	Active	
Adams State University	2011	Alamosa, Colorado	Active	
Barton College	2011	Wilson, North Carolina	Active	
Florida SouthWestern State College	2011	Fort Myers, Florida	Active	
Franklin University	2011	Columbus, Ohio	Active	
Georgia Gwinnett College	2011	Lawrenceville, Georgia	Active	
Indian River State College	2011	Fort Pierce, Florida	Active	
Kendall College	2011	Chicago, Illinois	Active	
Loras College	2011	Dubuque, Iowa	Active	
Penn State Altoona	2011	Altoona, Pennsylvania	Active	
Pensacola State College	2011	Pensacola, Florida	Active	
Vanguard University	2011	Costa Mesa, California	Active	
Washington Adventist University	2011	Takoma Park, Maryland	Active	
American Military University	2012	Manassas, Virginia	Active	
American Public University System	2012	Manassas, Virginia	Active	
College of Staten Island	2012	Staten Island, New York	Active	
Delaware Valley University	2012	Doylestown, Pennsylvania	Active	
Dominican University New York	2012	Orangeburg, New York	Active	
Grace College	2012	Winona Lake, Indiana	Active	
Indiana Institute of Technology	2012	Fort Wayne, Indiana	Active	
Stevenson University	2012	Owings Mills, Maryland	Active	
Texas College	2012	Tyler, Texas	Active	
Birmingham–Southern College	2013	Birmingham, Alabama	Inactive	(Note: Birmingham–Southern closed in 2024.)
Cambridge College	2013	Cambridge, Massachusetts	Active	
Excelsior University	2013	Albany, New York	Active	
Gwynedd Mercy University	2013	Gwynedd Valley, Pennsylvania	Active	
Lycoming College	2013	Williamsport, Pennsylvania	Active	
Ohio Christian University	2013	Circleville, Ohio	Active	
Ohio Valley University	2013	Vienna, West Virginia	Active	
Rockford University	2013	Rockford, Illinois	Active	
Southern Adventist University	2013	Collegedale, Tennessee	Active	
Spring Hill College	2013	Mobile, Alabama	Active	
Springfield College	2013	Springfield, Massachusetts	Active	
St. Francis College	2013	Brooklyn Heights, New York	Active	
Waynesburg University	2013	Waynesburg, Pennsylvania	Active	
William Penn University	2013	Oskaloosa, Iowa	Active	
Anna Maria College	2014	Paxton, Massachusetts	Active	
Ave Maria University	2014	Ave Maria, Florida	Active	
Bridgewater College	2014	Bridgewater, Virginia	Active	
Erskine College	2014	Due West, South Carolina	Active	
Lake–Sumter State College	2014	Leesburg, Florida	Active	
Lourdes University	2014	Sylvania, Ohio	Active	
McPherson College	2014	McPherson, Kansas	Active	
Miami Dade College	2014	Miami, Florida	Active	
Morningside University	2014	Sioux City, Iowa	Active	
Notre Dame College	2014	South Euclid, Ohio	Active	
Truett McConnell University	2014	Cleveland, Georgia	Active	
University of Phoenix	2014	Phoenix, Arizona	Active	
Baker University, Overland Park Campus	2015	Overland Park, Kansas	Active	
Bethany College	2015	Bethany, West Virginia	Active	
Concordia University Wisconsin	2015	Mequon, Wisconsin	Active	
Colorado State University–Global Campus	2015	Greenwood Village, Colorado	Active	
Johnson University Florida	2015	Kissimmee, Florida	Active	
Louisiana State University of Alexandria	2015	Alexandria, Louisiana	Active	
MacMurray College	2015	Jacksonville, Illinois	Inactive	(Note: MacMurray College closed in May 2020.)
Saint Anselm College	2015	Manchester, New Hampshire	Active	
University of North Texas at Dallas	2015	Dallas, Texas	Active	
Wilberforce University	2015	Wilberforce, Ohio	Active	
Young Harris College	2015	Young Harris, Georgia	Active	
Ashford University	2016 – 2023	San Diego, California	Inactive	(Note: Ashford University was acquired by the University of Arizona in 2023.)
California Southern University, Irvine Campus	2016 – 2022	Irvine, California	Inactive	
Central Christian College of Kansas	2016	McPherson, Kansas	Active	
College of Saint Benedict and Saint John's University	2016	St. Joseph, Minnesota	Active	
Faulkner University	2016	Montgomery, Alabama	Active	
Fitchburg State University	2016	Fitchburg, Massachusetts	Active	
Framingham State University	2016	Framingham, Massachusetts	Active	
Hope International University	2016	Fullerton, California	Active	
International College of the Cayman Islands	2016	Newlands, Cayman Islands	Active	
Monmouth College	2016	Monmouth, Illinois	Active	
State University of New York at Morrisville	2016	Morrisville, New York	Active	
Newbold College of Higher Education	2016	Bracknell, Berkshire, United Kingdom	Active	
North Central College	2016	Naperville, Illinois	Active	
Regent University	2016	Virginia Beach, Virginia	Active	
The Sage Colleges	2016	Albany, New York	Active	
University of Pittsburgh at Johnstown	2016	Johnstown, Pennsylvania	Active	
Bacone College	2017	Muskogee, Oklahoma	Active	
Benedictine University	2017	Lisle, Illinois	Active	
Blue Mountain Christian University	2017	Blue Mountain, Mississippi	Active	(Note: Chapter formed at Blue Mountain College, which became Blue Mountain Christian University in 2022.)
Bryant & Stratton College	2017	Buffalo, New York	Active	
Pennsylvania Western University, California	2017	California, Pennsylvania	Active	(Note: Chapter formed at California University of Pennsylvania, which became Pennsylvania Western University, California, in 2022.)
Chatham University	2017	Pittsburgh, Pennsylvania	Active	
Eastern Florida State College	2017	Melbourne, Florida	Active	
Lincoln College	2017	Lincoln, Illinois	Inactive	(Note: Lincoln College closed in May 2022.)
Newbury College	2017	Brookline, Massachusetts	Active	
North Haiti Christian University	2017	Limbé, Nord, Haiti	Active	
Saint Joseph's College of Maine	2017	Standish, Maine	Active	
St. Thomas University	2017	Miami Gardens, Florida	Active	
Universidad Iberoamericana	2017	Santo Domingo, Dominican Republic	Active	
University of Montana Western	2017	Dillon, Montana	Active	
William Peace University	2017	Raleigh, North Carolina	Active	
American University of Science and Technology	2018	Beirut, Lebanon	Active	
Bryn Athyn College	2018	Bryn Athyn, Pennsylvania	Active	
Columbia College SC	2018	Columbia, South Carolina	Active	
Lancaster Bible College	2018	Lancaster, Pennsylvania	Active	
North Central University	2018	Minneapolis, Minnesota	Active	
Northern Marianas College	2018	Saipan, Northern Mariana Islands	Active	
Randolph–Macon College	2018	Ashland, Virginia	Active	
University College of the Cayman Islands	2019	George Town, Cayman Islands	Active	
Colby-Sawyer College	2020	New London, New Hampshire	Active	
Lewis–Clark State College	2020	Lewiston, Idaho	Active	
Mid-America College	2021	Cordova, Tennessee	Active	
Thomas Edison State University	2021	Trenton, New Jersey	Active	
Buena Vista University	2022	Storm Lake, Iowa	Active	
Judson University	2023	Elgin, Illinois	Active	
University of Arizona Global Campus	2023	Chandler, Arizona	Active	
University of North Carolina at Asheville	2023	Asheville, North Carolina	Active	
University of Pittsburgh at Greensburg	2023	Hempfield Township, Pennsylvania	Active	
Talladega College	2024	Talladega, Alabama	Active	
Universidad del Sagrado Corazón	2024	San Juan, Puerto Rico	Active	
CUNY School of Professional Studies	2025	New York City, New York	Active	

== Notable members ==
- Anthony Allison, professional soccer player
- Rhubarb Jones, radio personality
- Belind Këlliçi, Albanian politician
- Jim Paymar, journalist

== See also ==
- Honor cords
- Professional fraternities and sororities
