= Wayne Shannon =

American news reporter, humorist

Gerald Wayne "Gerry" Schetzle, best known by the broadcast pseudonym Wayne Shannon, (1948-2011) was an American television news reporter, political pundit, and humorist who worked in Detroit, Philadelphia, and San Francisco during the late 1970s and 1980s.

Shannon became popular with San Francisco viewers from 1982 through 1988 for his nightly "Just 4 You" segments on KRON-TV, where his name received billing in newscast introductions along with the anchors and weather and sports presenters. Many of his commentaries, which dealt with local and global matters alike, were published in the 1986 essay collection Shannon: What's It All Mean? — a book which drew its title from the catchphrase Shannon used to end many of his segments. From 1989 until 1991 Shannon was a prominent on-air personality as a video essayist on national cable channel CNBC.

== Biography ==
=== Early years ===
Gerald Wayne Schetzle, known to his friends as "Gerry," was born January 16, 1948, in Spokane, Washington, but moved soon after to San Francisco, where he remained until age 12. Shannon attended junior high and high school in the small community of Moses Lake, where he first performed as an amateur/professional comedian. Following high school, he went to the American Academy of Dramatic Art in New York City, appeared off-Broadway as an actor and directed children's theater off-off Broadway.

Schetzle returned to Washington and attended Highline Community College in Des Moines, near Seattle, before enrolling in the University of Washington, from which he would graduate.

=== Career ===
Schetzle was a veteran of the Vietnam War as a member of the U.S. Army and was in Vietnam for one year from December 1969. It was there that he began his life under the stage name "Wayne Shannon," as part of the Army's Command Military Touring Shows in a 10-person touring company performing the musical comedy The Fantasticks for American troops stationed in the field.

Upon his return to the Pacific Northwest, Shannon worked as a typist for Boeing. This proved temporary and during the middle 1970s Shannon was able to fulfill his aspiration of a career in show business when he landed his first television job as a movie host. Shannon later moved to WJBK-TV in Detroit, where he reported on consumer issues.

After his time in Detroit, Shannon took a position with Philadelphia's KYW-TV where he worked as a feature reporter and essayist from 1980 to 1982.

Shannon premiered as a commentator at KRON-TV in San Francisco on July 5, 1982. "Even without opening his mouth, he projects an iconoclastic aura: There are pinchable cherubic cheeks and a rotund body of 240 pounds … that reminds one of Oliver Hardy. In his eyes there is the glint of Dennis the Menace, the twinkle of Thalia the Muse. His delivery has the same cute mannerisms of Hardy: He cocks his head in funny ways, arches his eyebrows on a slant to match his arch humor, and dares to indulge in a wordplay for which there is not fit punishment," a journalist wrote about Shannon's style. After Shannon's KRON-TV contract was not renewed in the spring of 1988, he migrated to national cable television channel CNBC where he worked as one of the network's originating commentators, delivering humorous and topical pieces in rotation throughout the broadcast day. Shannon prepared as many as three short essays a day for CNBC and was a prominent figure on the air for the network until it shifted its orientation to business coverage in the early 1990s.

Following his departure from CNBC in 1991, Shannon returned once more to the Pacific Northwest, working as a television reporter for several stations in the Portland, Oregon, and Vancouver, Washington, media market. He later worked from his home as a humorous internet weather forecaster for Yahoo.com under the moniker "The Weather Guru."

In his last years Shannon made his home in the town of Lewiston, Idaho.

=== Death and legacy ===
Wayne Shannon was reported missing by his family in September 2011. On April 28, 2012, Shannon's remains were found in the woods near Skookumchuck in Idaho County, Idaho, by a pair of hunters. An autopsy was completed on May 1, which found no signs of trauma and led investigators to conclude that Shannon took his own life. Shannon was 64 years old at the time of his death.

Shannon was the recipient of six Emmy Awards and four CableACE nominations for his reporting. He was eulogized by his friend the popular culture commentator Edward Champion as a "broadcasting innovator" as well as a topical satirist who was a "precursor to Jon Stewart, Stephen Colbert, and Michael Moore."

Joe Eskenazi of SF Weekly remembered Shannon as "a rotund, walrus-like man" who "sported a salt-and-pepper helmet-like hairstyle and a mustache that, to put it gently, went out of style after 1945." Shannon had, Eskenazi recalled, "a comedian's timing, a journalist's drive, and a satirist's bile" and whose delivery "felt like a guy in a bar telling you what's what."

== Works ==
- Shannon: What's It All Mean? Ross, CA: May-Murdock Publications, 1986.
