= Pete Wilson (broadcaster) =

American broadcaster (1945–2007)

- Born: April 5, 1945
- Died: July 20, 2007 (aged 62); Stanford, California, US
- Education: University of Wisconsin–Madison
- Years active: 1979-2007
- Notable credit(s): WTMJ-TV, KTXL, KGO-TV, KRON-TV

Peter James Wilson (April 5, 1945 – July 20, 2007) was an American broadcaster born in Wisconsin. For more than 20 years prior to his death, he worked in the San Francisco Bay Area. He was not related to the former California governor of the same name.

== Personal life ==
Wilson was a graduate of the University of Wisconsin–Madison and a Vietnam era veteran.

== Broadcasting career ==
Wilson's first broadcasting stint was at WTMJ in Milwaukee, Wisconsin, followed by stint as news anchor at KTXL in Sacramento, California in 1979 and later at his first stint at ABC-owned KGO-TV in 1983 before moving to then-NBC affiliate KRON-TV in 1990. In October 2001, he became one of the first high-profile employees to leave KRON after it was announced that the station would be losing its affiliation with the NBC television network. Subsequent to this, he returned to KGO-TV.

Wilson hosted a talk radio show on the number-one rated 50,000-watt KGO (AM) weekdays 2–4 p.m. up until his death in 2007. He was the winner of five Emmy Awards and a Peabody. Wilson also co-anchored the 6 p.m weekday editions of KGO-TV's ABC 7 News.

== Political stances ==
In the San Francisco Bay Area, Wilson was considered a moderate Democrat to moderate conservative, while others have referred to him as a common-sense liberal. He was not known to immediately endorse the fad or "politically correct" thinking of the day. Contemporaries considered him a journalist and a "traditional" newsman.

In his role as an inflammatory talk radio show host, Wilson raised controversy with comments he made on KGO radio on October 10, 2006, criticizing San Francisco Supervisor Bevan Dufty, who is gay, for his nonromantic co-parenting relationship with a lesbian friend, sparking calls for Wilson's resignation from four members of the San Francisco Board of Supervisors. Wilson later issued an apology for the harshness of his criticism, while standing by his opinion on such nontraditional relationships.

== Death ==
Pete Wilson died at age 62 after suffering a "massive heart attack during the operation, was put on life support, and last night (2007/07/20) was taken off" while having hip replacement surgery at Stanford University Medical Center.

During the last hour of his final radio broadcast, the day before his surgery, Wilson talked about his worries concerning the surgery with fellow KGO talk show host Gene Burns and invited callers to recount their own surgical experiences. It was reported later that Wilson had severe anxiety about the surgery and was hospitalized briefly at Stanford University Medical Center to recover from it. On September 17, 2007, longtime ABC reporter/anchor Gil Gross was named to replace Wilson in his radio post.

== Legacy ==
After his passing, Wilson's friends and colleagues at ABC7/KGO-TV-DT established a scholarship in his name. The annual scholarship is administered by the Radio Television Digital News Association. The scholarship is granted to either an undergraduate or graduate journalism student from the Bay area.

== Personal ==
Wilson lived in Mill Valley, California, with his wife Sandra and son Brendan.

Wilson publicly acknowledged his frequent use of Wikipedia.

== Obituaries ==
- Gold & Silver Circle Profiles
- Pete Wilson Obituary on WTMJ (archived on September 27, 2011 at the Wayback Machine)
- PETE WILSON | 1945-2007 / TV news anchor was a straight shooter
- TV anchor Pete Wilson’s death reveals limits of medicine
- Newsman Pete Wilson, a Marin resident, dies
- Pete Wilson, 62, news anchor
- ABC7 anchor Pete Wilson dies :: Bay Area Reporter
- KGO anchor Pete Wilson dead at 62
- KGO-TV co-anchor Wilson dies
- KGO's Pete Wilson dies at 62
- Pete Wilson Obituary (2007) - San Jose, CA - Mercury News
