= Vic Lee (journalist) =

American journalist (born 1946)

Victor Lee
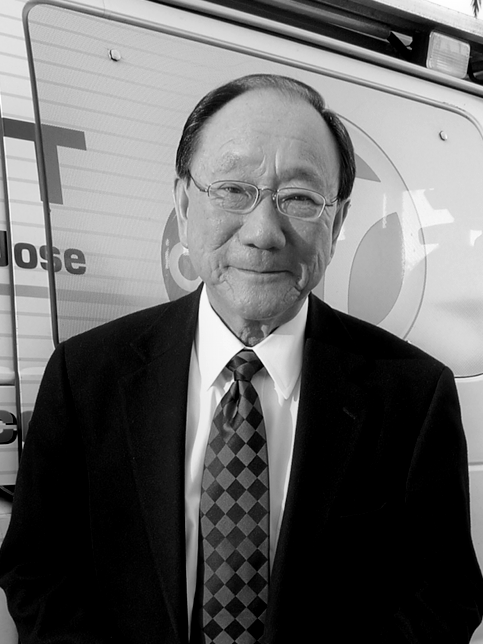
- Vic Lee in 2011
- Born: September 29, 1946 (age 79); Shanghai, China
- Occupation: Journalist

Vic Lee (born 29 September 1946) is a veteran TV reporter in the San Francisco Bay Area in the United States. He most recently worked for KGO-TV, with his reports broadcast on the five o'clock news, the six o'clock news, and ABC7 news at nine on KOFY.

== Early life ==
Lee was born in Shanghai, China and fled in 1949, to Tokyo, Japan. He went to The American School in Japan (1964) and San Jose State University Lee got an internship at the New York Times from his father's relationship with Abe Rosenthal.

== Career ==
After college, he and college cohorts founded a marketing company, in New York City, National Academic Services, to college student governments.

In 1969, Lee went to work for United Press International in Tokyo, Portland and Los Angeles.

Lee worked at KRON from 1972 to 2006, where he won several awards for his reporting.

"He left KRON briefly to continue Chinese studies, adding that language to his native language of Japanese. Returning to KRON, he became that station’s general assignment reporter with a specialty in Asian Affairs."

"on my assignments to Japan when i worked for NBC San Francisco KRON TV, I actually met and interviewed Watanabe, the Oyabun of the Yamaguchi-gumi gang in Kobe in his compound during the aftermath of the (1995) Quake there.... in the 80’s and early 90’s I did several stories on the Yakuza infiltration into San Francisco and also met a Yakuza Oyabun here through an FBI agent who was monitoring his activities" — Vic Lee 2013-12-07

He is known for his political reporting and contacts he has from his many years in the Bay Area.

Lee later worked at KGO-TV.

"...awards including the prestigious George Polk award of Journalism, Best Investigative Reporting, Best Live Coverage and Best Enterprise awards from the Associated Press and Best Spot News Story award from United Press International. For his work on the documentary “Airlift Africa and the Faces of Hunger,” he received a CINE Golden Eagle award, a New York Film Festival gold award; plus Best Documentary and Best Mini-Series awards from UPI, AP and several local Emmys."

On Wednesday, January 8, 2020, after 50 years of broadcasting in the San Francisco Bay Area, Lee announced his retirement.

== Personal life ==
Lee has a wife, Suzanne, daughter, Natallie, and lives in San Mateo.
