= Catherine Heenan =

Catherine Heenan (full name Mary Catherine Elizabeth Heenan) is a television news anchor and reporter at KRON-TV in San Francisco. She grew up in Indiana and Illinois, and spent several summers in Northern Ireland and England. She graduated from Illinois State University, where she majored in communication and journalism. In Milwaukee, Wisconsin, she covered legal and political beats, and received numerous awards for her investigative and general assignment reporting. When she left Milwaukee for San Francisco to anchor the KRON weekend news, a city proclamation naming a day in her honor was issued. Today, she anchors the KRON evening newscasts on a fill-in basis, and continues as a reporter.

Her work has ranged from political reporting to feature pieces, covering everything from papal visits to mafia trials. Particularly noteworthy is her exclusive series "Cloistered Nuns." She and her photographer became the only outsiders ever allowed to enter the monastery of the Poor Clares in Los Altos Hills.

Heenan is one of the most highly honored reporters in the San Francisco Bay Area. In addition to many regional Emmys, she has won a National Emmy and a Peabody Award.

She has also covered the peace plan process in Northern Ireland, the Women's World Cup Championship and the 1994 Northridge earthquake.

Heenan has been cited in local newspaper "best of" lists as one of the top anchors in the San Francisco Bay Area.
