= Jim Paymar =

American journalist

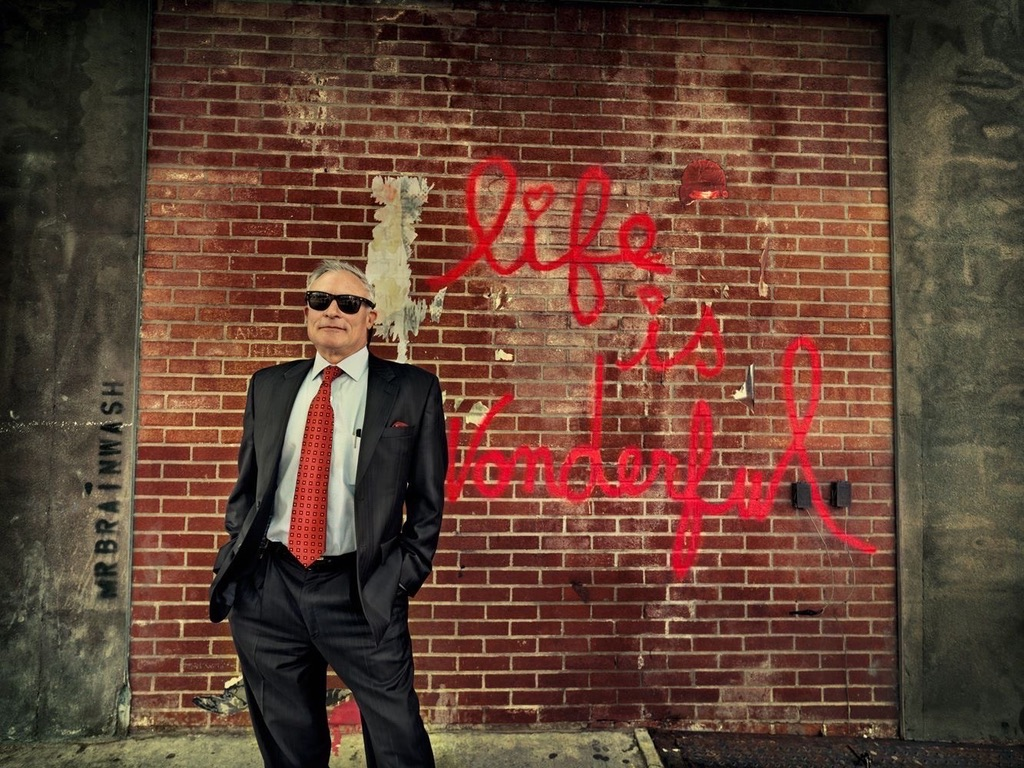
- Paymar with Mr. Brainwash street art behind
- Born: Duluth, Minnesota, U.S.
- Education: University of Minnesota (Graduated 1973) Molloy University (Graduated 2013)
- Occupations: American Journalist and Communications Specialist, President of Paymar Communications
- Spouse: Diane Masciale
- Children: 5
- Website: www.paymarcommunications.com

James Paymar is an American journalist and strategic communications specialist. He has worked as a financial correspondent and anchor for CNBC and BusinessWeek in New York and served as general manager of KCNS-TV in San Francisco. He anchored and reported the news for New York network flagship stations WNBC-TV, WABC-TV and Fox Broadcasting Company in New York. He also anchored and reported for KRON-NBC-TV in San Francisco, KOMO-ABC-TV in Seattle and KNTV-ABC-TV in San Jose. He now hosts a podcast, THE BIG SHIFT with Jim Paymar, available on Apple, Amazon, Google, Spotify and YouTube.

== Early life ==
Paymar was born in Duluth, Minnesota. His father Gordy Paymar was a broadcast pioneer in the early 1950s at WFTV and KDAL-TV in Duluth.

Paymar attended Washburn Elementary School, Woodland Junior High and East High School in Duluth, Minnesota. Paymar attended the University of Minnesota and graduated in 1973 with a degree in History and a teaching certificate. He received his MBA in Management at Molloy College in Rockville Centre, NY.

== Career ==
=== Radio anchor and reporter ===
After graduation, Paymar's first broadcast news anchor job was at CFAX 1070 in Victoria, British Columbia, Canada. He later moved on to another Victoria radio station, CKDA 1220. Realizing his goal of moving into TV at the Canadian Broadcasting Company (CBC) was limited because he was not a Canadian citizen, Paymar moved to the San Francisco Bay Area.

=== Television anchor ===
In 1976, Paymar became the Editorial Director and Investigative Correspondent at KNTV, the ABC station in San Jose. He won two Emmy Awards for editorial writing. While at KNTV, Paymar conducted an exclusive half-hour interview with Governor Jerry Brown. He also covered United Farm Workers leader César Chávez and the trials of Black Panther leader Huey Newton. He won commendations from the City of San Jose and Santa Clara County for his reporting. He later moved to the anchor desk.

In 1980, Paymar was offered a position anchoring and reporting at KOMO-TV, the ABC affiliate in Seattle, where he covered the Mount St. Helens volcanic eruption and its devastating aftermath. He also specialized government affairs and transportation.

In 1981, Paymar was offered an anchor and reporting position at WABC-TV., Channel 7 Eyewitness News., the flagship station of the ABC television network in New York. Paymar anchored the weekend news with Kaity Tong. He covered the Democratic gubernatorial primary race between New York City Mayor Ed Koch and Governor Mario Cuomo.

In 1982, Paymar returned to San Francisco to work at the weekend anchor desk at KRON-TV, then an NBC affiliate (it is now with MyNetworkTV). He soon became the prime-time anchor along with Roz Abrams and later Sylvia Chase. Paymar won two Emmy Awards, one for outstanding news talent and the other for outstanding documentary. During his tenure at KRON, Paymar conducted the last television interview with world-renowned photographer Ansel Adams. He also created Cover Story Magazine, a weekly news magazine program.

In 1988, Paymar became a news correspondent and anchor at the newly formed Fox Broadcasting Company in New York. He became a featured correspondent on the news magazine The Reporters. During his time at FOX, Paymar traveled to Germany during the fall of the Berlin Wall to report on the emergence of neo-Nazism in East Germany. He reported and anchored a special hour-long program on the crack cocaine epidemic, traveling throughout the U.S. and to the source of the U.S. cocaine supply in Colombia, South America. He also reported on the sex slave trade in Japan run by the Yakuza, the Japanese mafia.

In 2012, Paymar became the Executive Producer and anchor of the Long Island Business Report on WLIW/21. He also reports for WNET/13 for the program Metro Focus. WNET and WLIW are two of the top five PBS stations in America.

=== Television management ===
In 1991, Paymar became general manager of KCNS-TV. in San Francisco and created the first, all-Asian television station in the United States. He brought together local broadcasters and foreign news programs, including those from NHK in Japan, CCTV in China and KBS in Korea. Paymar also developed the Pacific Rim report with KPIX-TV, the CBS affiliate in San Francisco.

When KCNS was sold in 1993, Paymar returned to New York where he was a correspondent and anchor at WNBC-TV., NBC's flagship station in New York. He covered local politics and general news.

Paymar was soon hired at American Journal, a new national daily magazine program. He covered the O. J. Simpson story for a year in Los Angeles. He won a National Headliner Award for reporting on the hazards of bird strikes on aircraft which were plaguing the nation's airports.

=== Business correspondent ===
In 1997, Paymar became a correspondent at CNBC's new prime-time flagship business program Business Center, anchored by Maria Bartiromo. Paymar also covered the equity markets, interviewed the head of the U.S. Securities and Exchange Commission, Arthur Levitt, as well as the heads of NASDAQ and the New York Stock Exchange. Paymar interviewed leading business figures including Larry Ellison, CEO of Oracle; John Chambers, CEO of Cisco, Michael Dell, CEO of Dell Computer; and Hugh McColl, CEO of Bank of America. Paymar also anchored news programs, news updates and breaking news while at CNBC. He also founded the Molloy Business Channel,“MBC” at Molloy College in New York.

=== Business consultant ===
In 2002, Paymar formed his own media consultancy, Paymar Communications Group, and focused his efforts on the financial world. Paymar's clients included JPMorgan Chase, The Wall Street Journal, Standard & Poor's, The Royal Bank of Scotland, Bank of America, ING, Morgan Stanley, and Thomson Reuters.

In 2006 Paymar went back into broadcasting as chief financial anchor for BusinessWeek, broadcasting to the ABC News Radio and Satellite Networks and ABC owned stations, including WABC 770 in New York. He also contributed to BusinessWeek Weekend, the nationally syndicated television program.

Paymar writes a blog on the Paymar Communications Group website and his writing has appeared in Forbes Magazine.

=== Corporate communications ===
In 2007, one of his former media consulting clients, Indra Nooyi, the CEO of PepsiCo, offered him the position of Senior Vice President of Corporate Communications at the global headquarters in Purchase, New York. Paymar was responsible for all internal and external communications and web based efforts as well as acting as liaison with major news media such as the Wall Street Journal, the Financial Times, Fortune Magazine and Bloomberg.

In 2009, Paymar returned to his media consultancy, Paymar Communications Group, working with Fortune 500 clients including Citi Smith Barney, Morgan Stanley, Pfizer, AOL, Royal Bank of Scotland, Bank of America, AOL, FTSE, UBS, NBC, About.Com, GlaxoSmithKline and McGraw-Hill Financial.

== Awards, commendations and education ==
Awards

- Press Club of Long Island, Society of Professional Journalists, Business Programming 2013
- Folio Award Long Island's Fair Media Council Talk Show/Commentary 2013
- National Headliner Investigative Reporting 1997
- Emmy Documentary 1987
- Emmy News Talent 1985
- UPI (USA & CA) Investigative Reporting 1980
- Gabriel Documentary 1978
- Emmy Editorial Writing 1978
- Emmy Editorial Writing 1977

Commendations

- Santa Clara County Board of Supervisors
- San Jose City Council
- American Cancer Society
- Western Telecommunications Education Association

Education

- Molloy University, MBA, Management
- Sigma Beta Delta – Int’l Business Honor Society
- University of Minnesota, Bachelor of Science, History/Education
- University of Pennsylvania, Wharton School, Business Seminar Program

== Personal life ==
Paymar is married to Diane Masciale Vice-President and General Manager of WLIW21 New York, formerly with ABC and NBC News. He has five children, Sheryl, Joseph, Daniel, Max and Leana.
