= Pete Giddings =

American meteorologist (born 1939)

- Born: Peter F. Giddings; 1939 (age 86–87); New York City, New York, U.S.
- Occupation: Meteorologist

Peter F. Giddings (born in 1939 in New York City) is a multiple Emmy Award winning television meteorologist.

He worked as a local television news meteorologist in Northern California and Northern Nevada. He is best known for his 29 years as a meteorologist at KGO-TV in San Francisco. Giddings earned six Emmy Awards during his tenure at KGO. He now works at Second Harvest Food of Santa Clara and San Mateo Counties as a volunteer coordinator.

== Career ==
Giddings' first television job was at WTVT-TV in Tampa, Florida where he worked for five years. After a stop in Nashville, Tennessee, he moved to KGO in 1970. He joined Reno, Nevada’s KOLO-TV in January 1999. In 2001, he returned to predicting coastal storms in California as he returned to KGO (AM) and at the same time, Giddings forecast the weather at KION and KCBA in Salinas from 2003 to 2007. Giddings began one of the first regional broadcast ski reports in the 1960s. He is now doing web based forecasts for the Bay Area on his own website.

In Disney's 1997 film George of the Jungle (based on Jay Ward's 1960s animated television series of the same name), Giddings appears as the ABC7 meteorologist that George (Brendan Fraser) is watching while hyped up on coffee.

== Meteorology ==
- Fellow, American Meteorological Society (AMS)
- AMS Certified Consulting Meteorologist (CCM)
- Member, AMS Board of Directors of Radio and Television
- Member, AMS Board of School and Popular Meteorological Education
- Fellow, Royal Meteorological Society (United Kingdom)
- Lecturer, UC Berkeley, Stanford University, Dominican University, and Desert Research Institute

In 1990, the AMS honored Giddings with the Award for Outstanding Service by a broadcast meteorologist in recognition of his efforts to combat scientific illiteracy among youth.

In 1996, Giddings was one of fifty meteorologists from around the world to be invited by the Clinton administration to participate in a summit on Climate Change.

== Education ==
Giddings won a national Emmy Award in 1977 for his work producing an educational program entitled What Makes the Wind Blow.

In 1990, the California State Legislature and congresswoman Nancy Pelosi honored Giddings with an official resolution for Weather Fun with Pete Giddings a twenty lesson basic meteorology course for fourth, fifth, and sixth graders. The program ran in more than 200 California schools.

== Personal life ==
Originally from New York City, Giddings attended the University of Maryland and University of South Florida in Tampa. Pete and his wife live in San Jose, California. They have one son. Pete has a daughter and son from previous marriage.
