= Court Appointed Special Advocates =

U.S. non-profit organization

- Abbreviation: CASA
- Formation: 1977
- Type: Youth organization
- Legal status: Non-profit organization
- Headquarters: Seattle, Washington
- Region served: United States
- Website: www.nationalcasagal.org

Court Appointed Special Advocates (CASA) is a national organization in the United States that supports and promotes the use of trained volunteers to advocate for children who have experienced abuse or neglect. CASA volunteers are appointed by a judge and are responsible for gathering information, maintaining contact with the child, and providing recommendations to the court based on the child’s best interests while also considering the child’s expressed wishes. Volunteers typically remain assigned to a case for its duration, which can provide continuity in situations where children may experience multiple placements or changes in service providers. CASA volunteers may also serve as a consistent adult presence for children involved in the child welfare system, helping ensure that their needs, experiences, and perspectives are represented throughout the legal process.

== History ==
In 1977, King County Superior Court Judge David Soukup was tasked with making decisions about abused and neglected children using only the information provided by Child Protective Services. Recognizing that courts often lacked consistent, child-focused insight, Soukup developed the idea of appointing trained community volunteers to gather information and advocate for a child’s best interests. His approach was intended to provide judges with more complete and individualized information when making decisions that could significantly affect a child’s life.

Fifty volunteers initially responded to this idea, forming the foundation of the CASA program. The model expanded beyond King County and was adopted in jurisdictions across the United States as courts and child welfare systems sought additional support in managing complex dependency cases. Over time, CASA programs became integrated into many local systems as a supplemental source of information and advocacy.

By 2007, the National CASA Association had served more than 2 million children nationwide. The continued growth of CASA programs reflects ongoing efforts to improve how courts receive information and make decisions in cases involving abuse and neglect.

== Current situation ==
Since its founding, CASA programming has expanded to 49 U.S. states and the District of Columbia. Each state program operates independently and is responsible for developing and funding its own budget. Some programs receive government funding, while others rely on private donations, grants, and partnerships with nonprofit organizations and community groups.

CASA volunteers are typically appointed early in a child welfare case, often at or near the first hearing. Once assigned, volunteers gather information from multiple sources, including the child, caregivers, educators, medical providers, and social workers, to provide the court with a more comprehensive understanding of the child’s circumstances. This may include reviewing records, attending meetings, and observing interactions in different environments.

Volunteers often maintain regular contact with the child throughout the case, which can provide continuity and updated insight over time. In systems where children may experience multiple placements or changes in caseworkers, this consistency can contribute to a more stable understanding of the child’s needs and experiences.

In some jurisdictions, a child may also be assigned a guardian ad litem (GAL), an attorney responsible for representing the child’s legal interests in court. Depending on the state, the roles of CASA and GAL may overlap, or a child may have both assigned simultaneously.

CASA programs operate within a broader child welfare system that often involves high caseloads and limited court time. In this context, CASA volunteers are intended to provide additional attention to individual cases by focusing specifically on the child’s needs and circumstances. Their role is not to replace legal or social work professionals, but to supplement existing information available to the court.

There are over 400,000 children in foster care in the United States, while CASA programs serve approximately 200,000 to 250,000 children annually.

== Training ==
CASA volunteers are members of the community who complete training provided by their state or local CASA program before being appointed to a case. Pre-service training typically includes at least 30 hours of instruction, court observation, and ongoing continuing education requirements. Volunteers must also pass a criminal background check prior to working with children.

Training programs are designed to prepare volunteers to work within the child welfare and legal systems and may include topics such as child development, trauma, family dynamics, cultural awareness, and communication with children and professionals. Volunteers are also introduced to documentation practices, court procedures, and ethical considerations related to confidentiality and professional boundaries.

Each state develops its own program while following national standards. Although there are no formal educational requirements beyond completing training, volunteers are expected to demonstrate the ability to understand case information, communicate effectively, and act in the best interests of the child.

== Criticism ==
A 2019 study examining outcomes for 31,754 children in Texas found that children assigned a CASA were less likely to reach legal permanency as a final case outcome. The study noted that CASA volunteers are often assigned to more complex cases and emphasized limitations, including that findings were specific to Texas and focused on legal permanency rather than broader measures of well-being.

Other research has noted that evaluating CASA effectiveness is complex due to variation in program implementation, differences across jurisdictions, and the broader structure of the child welfare system. Outcomes may depend on factors such as case characteristics, level of volunteer involvement, and available services.

Some studies suggest CASA involvement may be associated with increased access to services, improved information available to the court, and more individualized attention to children’s needs, though these outcomes are not always reflected in legal case timelines.

A law review article has raised concerns about structural inequities within CASA programs, noting that volunteers are often from predominantly white and middle-class backgrounds while serving families who are disproportionately nonwhite and economically disadvantaged. Scholars have suggested that this dynamic may influence how families are perceived and represented within the system.

Overall, research on CASA programs presents mixed findings, with scholars emphasizing that outcomes are shaped by the complexity of the child welfare system rather than any single intervention.

== See also ==
- Child Protection and Obscenity Enforcement Act
- Convention on the Rights of the Child
