= San Francisco Baykeeper =

Non-profit organization in the USA

San Francisco Baykeeper is a nonprofit environmental advocacy organization that uses science and the law to protect, preserve, and enhance the health of the ecosystems and communities that depend upon the San Francisco Bay, the San Francisco Bay-Delta Estuary, and its watershed. SF Baykeeper is the only organization, governmental or non-profit, that regularly patrols the Bay by boat and drone to document sources of pollution.

The San Francisco Bay watershed—in addition to its recreational value and the biological diversity it supports—provides drinking water for more than 23 million people, and is vital to California's economy. Beginning in the high reaches of the Sierra Nevada and Cascade Mountains, the Bay-Delta watershed encompasses the entirety of the Bay Area as well as the Great Central Valley of California. This vast watershed includes virtually all of the state's remaining coastal wetlands, and provides rare and fragile habitat for marine mammals, migrating birds, and California's few remaining endangered salmon runs.

Baykeeper was founded in 1989 by research scientist Dr. Michael Herz, on the principle that California's waterways are common property, owned by all who use and enjoy them. Baykeeper works to rehabilitate natural environments and promote new strategies and policies to protect the water quality of the Bay-Delta Estuary.

Baykeeper and its Deltakeeper project operate both in the San Francisco Bay and the Sacramento-San Joaquin River Delta. It was the fourth "Waterkeeper" organization in the nation and the first on the West Coast of the United States. The organization withdrew from the Waterkeeper Alliance in 2022 over jurisdictional issues.
