= Jennifer Jolly =

American journalist and broadcaster

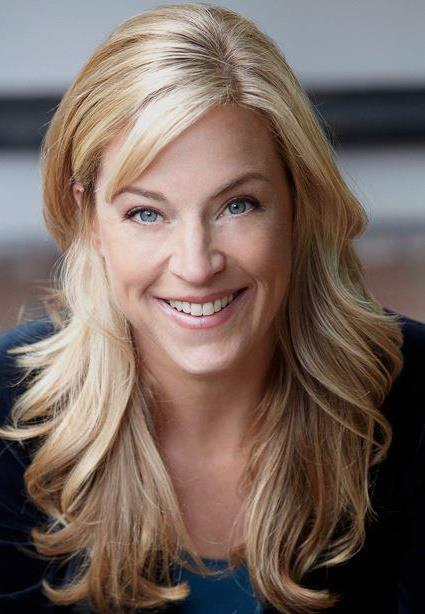
- Born: Jennifer Jolly; February 22, 1971 (age 55); Alaska, United States
- Education: University of San Francisco
- Occupation: Consumer Technology Journalist
- Children: 1

Jennifer Jolly (born February 22, 1971) is an American consumer technology journalist and TV broadcaster. She is a Wired Well columnist for The New York Times, tech-life columnist and host of Tech Now for USA Today, and a digital lifestyle contributor for The Today Show.

== Career ==
Jennifer Jolly is an Emmy Award-winning journalist who reviews new gadgets and provides insight on technology trends. Her work can be seen on The Huffington Post, Yahoo Tech, The CBS Early Show, The Talk, Rachael Ray, The Dr. Oz Show, The Meredith Vieira Show, Katie Couric and Reader's Digest Magazine. Jolly is also a public speaker who focuses on women in technology, digital parenting, health and fitness technology and tech-related consumer advocacy.

Jolly was a general assignment TV news reporter for 12 years before shifting her focus to consumer technology. She worked for KTVU-TV in Oakland, California (1997-2005), KTUU-TV in Anchorage, Alaska (1995-1997), KXLY-TV in Spokane, Washington, (1994-1995) and KECI-TV in Bozeman and Missoula, Montana (1993-1994). Over the course of her career she received awards from the Society of Professional Journalists, Associated Press and the Radio Television News Director's Association.

In late 2005, Jolly took a job with global media agency, Allison PR, to "be home in time to tuck my daughter in bed," and to "break into the world of consumer technology reporting, which was still a man's world." Jolly created the firm's Media Training program, while still maintaining a role in TV. She was a frequent guest contributor to several TV news programs and host of the weekly series All That's Fit on the Fine Living Network.

In 2010, Jolly took a full-time position back in television, as the technology/social media contributor of ABC's afternoon program, 7Live. She worked there from the show's first broadcast until August, 2011, when she became a frequent technology and social media guest contributor for the nationally televised morning program, CBS Early Show. Also in 2011, she became the Tech Life Editor for the female-focused tech news site, Tecca. At Tecca, Jolly created and hosted Tech's Appeal, The Girlfriend's Guide To Gadgets, which aired on Yahoo Tech, Time, and other partner outlets.

Tecca shut down in late 2012 and USA Today brought Jolly on-board, where the renamed Tech Now series now runs weekly. Jolly began writing the Wired Well column for the New York Times in May 2015.

== Personal life ==
Jolly grew up in Kenai, Alaska, and worked alongside her family on a small commercial salmon fishing boat during the summers until she graduated from college. She received a journalism scholarship to the University of San Francisco, where she graduated with a degree in Mass Media Studies in 1993.

Jolly has been active in community theater, a competitive equestrian, distance runner and triathlete. She also helped create a series of outdoor fitness companies in the San Francisco Bay Area, OutFIT, Mom&Baby, and Team Love Multisports.
