= KRON-TV =

Television station in San Francisco

ATSC 3.0 station
- San Francisco–Oakland–San Jose, California; United States
- City: San Francisco, California
- Channels: Digital: 7 (VHF); Virtual: 4
- Branding: KRON 4 (pronounced "chron"); KRON 4 News; KRON 4 CW (for CW programming)

Programming
- Affiliations: 4.1: The CW; for others, see § Subchannels

Ownership
- Owner: Nexstar Media Group; (Nexstar Media Inc.)

History
- First air date: November 15, 1949
- Former call signs: KCPR (CP, 1946–1948)
- Former channel numbers: Analog: 4 (VHF, 1949–2009); Digital: 57 (UHF, 1998–2009), 38 (UHF, 2009–2020)
- Former affiliations: NBC (primary 1949–2001, secondary 2010–2011); Independent (2001–2006); MyNetworkTV (primary 2006–2023, secondary 2023–2024)
- Call sign meaning: San Francisco Chronicle (former co-owned newspaper)

Technical information
- Licensing authority: FCC
- Facility ID: 65526
- ERP: 50 kW
- HAAT: 507.2 m (1,664 ft)
- Transmitter coordinates: 37°45′19″N 122°27′10″W

Links
- Public license information: Public file; LMS
- Website: www.kron4.com

KRON-TV (channel 4) is a television station licensed to San Francisco, California, United States, serving as the CW network outlet for the San Francisco Bay Area. Owned by Nexstar Media Group, KRON-TV maintains studios at the ABC Broadcast Center on Front Street in the city's historic Northeast Waterfront district, immediately west of The Embarcadero, in the same building as ABC owned-and-operated station KGO-TV, channel 7 (but with completely separate operations from that station). The transmitting antenna is located atop Sutro Tower in San Francisco.

== History ==
=== NBC affiliation (1949–2001) ===
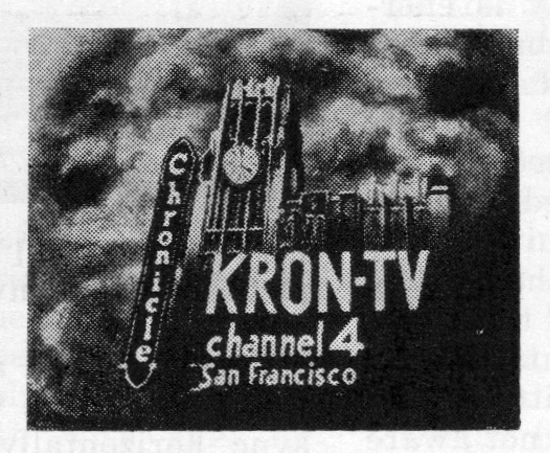
KRON's original logo, from 1949, depicted what would become its 50-year association with the San Francisco Chronicle.

In 1948, the Federal Communications Commission (FCC) authorized a construction permit by the Chronicle Publishing Company, publishers of the San Francisco Chronicle daily newspaper, for a new television station in San Francisco, KRON-TV. Chronicle Publishing was founded by brothers Charles and Michael de Young. The company already owned radio station KRON-FM.

Managed by Michael de Young's grandson Charles de Young Thieriot, KRON-TV signed on the air on November 15, 1949, as a full-time NBC affiliate. Its opening night program schedule included a special about San Francisco entertainment followed by the usual NBC prime time lineup of the Texaco Star Theater with Milton Berle, The Life of Riley, Mohawk Showroom, and The Chesterfield Supper Club. KRON-TV was the third television outlet in the Bay Area behind KGO-TV (channel 7) and KPIX-TV (channel 5), all going on the air within a year, and the last license before the FCC placed a moratorium on new television station licenses that would last the next four years.

KRON-TV originally broadcast from studios located in the basement of the Chronicle Building at Fifth and Mission Streets. Newscasts benefited from the resources of the Chronicle and there was cooperation between KRON-TV and the newspaper. It originally maintained transmitter facilities, master control and a small insert studio on San Bruno Mountain. In August 1959, the Chronicle reported that the tower was severely damaged by an unusually strong thunderstorm, requiring major repairs before KRON-TV could return to the air. In 1960, NBC attempted to purchase its own station in the Bay Area, when they attempted to buy KTVU. The sale was canceled that October due to pre-existing concerns over the sale cited by the FCC that were related to NBC's ownership of radio and television stations in Philadelphia; as a result, NBC stayed with KRON-TV.

In the early 1960s, KRON-TV's profits were keeping the Chronicle Publishing Company financially solvent at a time when the San Francisco Chronicle was losing money, around $3 million from 1958 to 1965. In 1967, KRON-FM-TV moved to a new studio at 1001 Van Ness Avenue in the Western Addition neighborhood (a location that formerly served as the site of the Roman Catholic cathedral of San Francisco). The television transmitter was moved to Sutro Tower on July 4, 1973, while the FM transmitter remained on San Bruno Mountain.

Since the 1970s, KRON-TV's logo has incorporated a stylized number "4" design that is based on the Golden Gate Bridge. The vertical component is a bridge tower, the horizontal component is a portion of the bridge deck, and the curve is a portion of a suspension cable. This logo was used as early as April 1974, during coverage of a Symbionese Liberation Army bank robbery. By about 1991, this evolved into the "circle 4" logo in use to this day, with the "4" using a simpler bridge design.

In 1982, the deYoung family's Chronicle Publishing Company unit discussed a possible trade of KRON-TV to the Gannett Company (whose broadcasting division is now part of Tegna) in exchange for acquiring Gannett's Oklahoma City station KOCO-TV, plus an additional $100 million. The proposal ultimately fell apart by September 1983.

==== Sale to Young Broadcasting ====
On June 16, 1999, the deYoung family announced the liquidation of Chronicle Publishing's assets. By this point, the deYoungs owned three television stations (including KRON-TV) in large and mid-sized media markets around the country, two of which were sold off to LIN TV (which traded KAKE-TV in Wichita and WOWT in Omaha to Benedek Broadcasting in turn). The San Francisco Chronicle, meanwhile, was acquired by the Hearst Corporation in a $295 million deal in October of that year.

NBC had made many offers for channel 4 over the years, but the deYoungs turned them down each time. It finally saw the opportunity to get an owned-and-operated station in what was then the United States' fifth-largest television market and quickly jumped into the bidding war for KRON-TV. NBC was seen as the frontrunner to buy the station, but it was outbid at the last minute on November 16, 1999. KRON-TV was bought by New York City-based Young Broadcasting, then-owner of Los Angeles independent station KCAL-TV and several other stations in medium to small markets. Young's purchase price for the station ($750 million at the outset, rising to $820 million by closing) was a record price for a single station that stands to this day. To help finance the down payment, Young was forced to sell La Crosse, Wisconsin, CBS affiliate WKBT to Morgan Murphy Media.

NBC president and chief executive officer Bob Wright had warned that if NBC did not succeed in buying KRON-TV, it would require any prospective buyer to uphold specific terms if it wanted to retain the NBC affiliation. Wright did not rule out moving NBC's Bay Area affiliation elsewhere. When Young closed on its purchase of channel 4, NBC made good on these threats by demanding that Young operate KRON-TV under the same conventions as an NBC owned-and-operated outlet. Among other things, it demanded that KRON-TV change its on-air name to "NBC 4" and run the network's entire schedule in pattern (reducing prime time preemptions due to local programming from 20 hours to five hours a year). Preemptions would only be permitted for extended breaking news or severe weather coverage. NBC also demanded yearly payments of $10 million from Young, a form of reverse compensation, flipping around the then-normal mode of networks paying their affiliates for their airtime. (In turn, NBC would stop making annual payments to KRON-TV of $7.5 million to carry the network's programming.) Young would also have to give NBC the first option on the programming of additional subchannels on the station's digital signal.

Rather than give in to NBC's demands, Young decided not to renew channel 4's affiliation contract, which was set to expire at the beginning of 2002. San Jose-based KNTV (channel 11) approached NBC with a proposal to pay $37 million annually for the rights to broadcast its programming. In 1999, KNTV joined The WB in conjunction with the network's existing Bay Area affiliate, then co-owned KBWB (channel 20, now KOFY-TV). KNTV agreed to drop its ABC affiliation at the behest of network-owned KGO-TV, the market's primary ABC station. NBC accepted KNTV's deal in February 2000. It did so primarily as a stopgap in case NBC failed in its bid to buy KRON-TV from Young.

However, Young's asking price for the station was $735 million, only slightly less than what it paid to buy the station from Chronicle. NBC felt that price was too high, and walked away from the deal when Young refused to lower it.

In December 2001, NBC purchased KNTV from Granite Broadcasting for a fraction of KRON-TV's sale price of $230 million. That made NBC the only major broadcast network to have switched from one Bay Area station to another. The last NBC program to be broadcast by channel 4 was a repeat episode of Crossing Jordan, at 10 p.m. on December 31, 2001. KNTV officially joined NBC later that evening at 11:35 p.m. with the regular broadcast of The Tonight Show with Jay Leno. That ended KRON-TV's 52-year affiliation with the NBC network.

=== Independent station (2001–2006) ===
January 1, 2002, was KRON-TV's first full day as an independent station. That morning, KRON-TV broadcast the Rose Parade from the feed of Los Angeles station KTLA (then affiliated with The WB), with Bob Eubanks and Stephanie Edwards as co-hosts.

With ABC, CBS, UPN and now NBC carrying their programming locally on owned-and-operated stations (KGO-TV, KPIX-TV, KBHK—channel 44, now KPYX—and KNTV, respectively), and Fox and The WB under contract with KTVU and KBWB, respectively, KRON-TV became an independent station by default. The station filled time slots formerly occupied by NBC shows with syndicated programming and expanded newscasts. The NBC network was near the top of the ratings nationally at the time of the disaffiliation, due to strong shows such as Friends, Frasier, Law & Order and ER. Without those NBC shows, KRON's ratings started to decline. The viewership of its newscasts began to fall substantially by the time the station regained a network affiliation.

In 2005, KRON-TV downsized its news production staff to send teams of two people, specifically a reporter and camera operator, to generate news stories on scene. SF Weekly reported in 2006 that KRON-TV was the first major-market television station to make such a decision and commented, "the results at times are more akin to home movies than news programming broadcast to the nation's sixth-largest TV market."

=== MyNetworkTV affiliation (2006–2024) ===
KRON-TV's previous MyNetworkTV logo.

On February 22, 2006, News Corporation announced the launch of MyNetworkTV. The network was created partly in response to CBS Corporation and Time Warner's January 24 announcement that UPN and The WB would be shut down and replaced with the jointly owned CW Television Network. (CBS-owned UPN affiliate KBHK, whose call sign became KBCW by the network's launch, was named The CW's Bay Area affiliate. WB affiliate KBWB became an independent station.) KRON-TV became a MyNetworkTV affiliate when it debuted on September 5, 2006. (It was one of the largest MyNetworkTV-affiliated stations not to previously have been an affiliate of either The WB or UPN, second only to the network's Dallas O&O KDFI.) KRON-TV began branding itself as "MyKRON 4" for MyNetworkTV programming, although it promoted itself as "KRON 4" outside of the service's programming hours. After joining MyNetworkTV, the station moved its hour-long 9 p.m. newscast to 8 p.m. It chose to run the fledgling network's programming from 9 to 11 p.m., one hour later than MyNetworkTV's standard 8 to 10 p.m. scheduling in the Pacific Time Zone. As of December 2020, MyNetworkTV programming aired from midnight to 2 a.m. Upon affiliating with the CW on September 1, 2023, KRON-TV pushed MyNetworkTV programming back to 1 a.m. to 3 a.m. From July 2024 until its last airdate on September 14, 2024, MyNetworkTV programming aired from 2 a.m. to 4 a.m. The programming service moved to Fox-owned KICU-TV effective September 16, 2024.

==== Young Broadcasting bankruptcy ====
On January 10, 2008, Young Broadcasting announced it would sell KRON-TV. The company had been encountering difficulties in meeting interest payments on its outstanding debt. Young's stock, which had been trading for a few cents per share, was ultimately delisted from NASDAQ in January 2009, after failing to meet the minimum standards for being on the exchange. One month later on February 13, Young made a filing to place the company under Chapter 11 bankruptcy protection. Debt incurred from its 1999 purchase of KRON-TV was believed to be one key factor behind the company's cash problems. Young originally hoped to close a sale of the station by the end of the first quarter of 2008, but no buyer emerged.

On February 13, 2009, the company declared Chapter 11 bankruptcy. At the last minute, Young canceled a planned auction of all 10 of its stations five months later on July 14, a move believed to have been made due to a lack of suitable bids. Instead of auctioning off the stations, Young and its secured lenders reached a deal where the lenders (among them Wachovia and Credit Suisse) would take control of the company, and Gray Television would manage seven of Young's ten stations. KRON-TV, WATE-TV in Knoxville, Tennessee, and WLNS-TV in Lansing, Michigan (the latter two, unlike KRON-TV, compete with Gray-owned stations in their respective markets), were the only stations not included in the management deal.

In February 2010, Young discussed the possibility of entering into a shared services agreement (SSA) with KNTV's owner NBCUniversal. That year, KRON-TV informally reunited with NBC as it began to carry network programs during sports programming and breaking news events that force their preemptions on KNTV. (This responsibility as a backup NBC affiliate was assumed by KNTV's Cozi TV-affiliated second digital subchannel in 2014.)

Station management announced at a November 2011 meeting that no such agreement would take place, and that KRON-TV would instead relocate to a smaller, state-of-the-art facility within the next year to year-and-a-half. A week later, it was also announced the station's master control operations would be operated remotely from Atlanta beginning in mid-January 2012. The move to new studios, and plans to operate master control from Atlanta, were scrapped by June 2012.

==== Acquisitions by Media General, then Nexstar ====
On June 6, 2013, Media General announced it would acquire Young Broadcasting in an all-stock deal. The merger was completed on November 12, 2013. The move made KRON-TV the largest station by market size owned by Media General as well as the company's only station west of the Rocky Mountains until Media General acquired LIN Media, including Portland station KOIN in 2014. (Most of Media General's television stations were in the Southeastern, Midwestern and Northeastern United States.)

On February 10, 2014, Media General announced that KRON-TV would move into leased space on the third floor of KGO-TV's building (ABC Broadcast Center) at 900 Front Street, in space formerly occupied by radio stations KGO and KSFO. KRON-TV's studios at 1001 Van Ness Avenue would then be put up for sale; it was later demolished in 2019 to make way for a new assisted living facility for senior citizens. Despite the colocation, KRON-TV maintains separate broadcast facilities from KGO-TV and employs a completely separate staff. Each station's employees are restricted by keycards from entering the other's facilities.

In June 2014, Fox Television Stations announced it would acquire KTVU and KICU-TV in a trade with Cox Media Group in exchange for that company's stations in Boston and Memphis. Prior to the announcement it was rumored that Fox had considered buying KRON-TV and moving Fox network programming to channel 4. (Had Fox actually acquired KRON-TV, this would have made it one of the two major networks in the Bay Area, along with NBC, to switch from one station to another.) Fox completed its acquisition of KTVU and KICU-TV on October 8, 2014; despite MyNetworkTV being operated by Fox Television Stations, KRON-TV remained an affiliate of the service for another 10 years.

On January 27, 2016, Nexstar Broadcasting Group announced that it had reached an agreement to acquire Media General. The transaction was consummated on January 17, 2017, and with it, KRON-TV became part of the Nexstar Media Group.

=== CW affiliation (2023–present) ===
In May 2023, CBS News and Stations announced that its CW affiliates, including San Francisco station KBCW (now KPYX), would cease their affiliation with the network in September and become independent stations. Nexstar Media Group announced on June 14 that KRON-TV would take over the CW affiliation for the San Francisco market on September 1.

== Programming ==
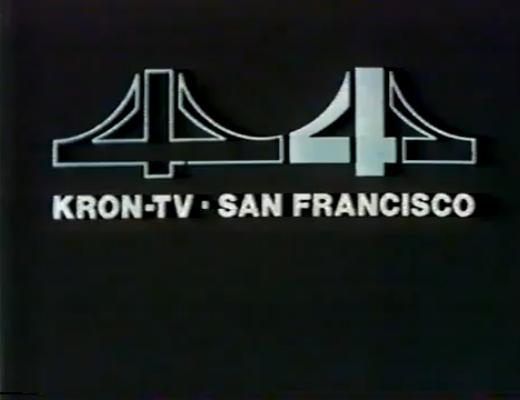
The original version of KRON-TV's current logo was based on the design of the Golden Gate Bridge. Station identifications used by the station during the 1970s and 1980s usually depicted the logo hidden in positive space within a full-scale design of the bridge.

Until the late 1970s, KRON-TV was known for being very San Francisco-centric in its news coverage and audience targeting, an approach that would become costly to the station as population growth in areas outside San Francisco soared. Realizing this and refocusing on the entire market enabled KRON-TV to become the dominant station in the Bay Area.

=== Syndicated programs ===
As of September 2024, syndicated programming on KRON-TV includes Inside Edition and Entertainment Tonight which are distributed by CBS Media Ventures, as well as Judy Justice. During the 1980s, KRON-TV continued its dominance by airing top-rated syndicated programs, including the Merv Griffin-produced game shows Jeopardy! and Wheel of Fortune (the original NBC daytime versions of both series also aired on KRON-TV), as well as Entertainment Tonight. The game show pair was moved to ABC-owned KGO-TV in February 1992—seven months ahead of schedule—as a direct result of KRON-TV's experiment with its early prime time schedule that year.

=== Past programming preemptions and deferrals ===
For most of its tenure with NBC, KRON-TV was the network's second-largest affiliate (behind only KYW-TV in Philadelphia) and its largest on the West Coast. Despite this, KRON-TV occasionally preempted NBC programming. One notable omission was Another World, which would eventually air on the station in the early 1990s; KRON-TV's decision to drop the daytime soap opera in the summer of 1998 (leaving Days of Our Lives and the struggling Sunset Beach as the only network soaps on its schedule) is thought to have hastened NBC's decision to cancel it altogether a year later. Two NBC daytime game shows, 50 Grand Slam and Just Men!, were never seen in the Bay Area. KRON-TV also did not air NBC's soap operas in pattern (for example, KRON-TV aired Days of Our Lives after Another World, rather than the standard slot for NBC affiliates in the Pacific Time Zone—at 2 or 3 p.m. depending on the season and time slot). Channel 4 also preempted some of the network's prime time programs. Similar to fellow NBC station KCRA-TV in neighboring Sacramento, KRON-TV stopped airing the Saturday morning TNBC lineup in the early 1990s. Historically, NBC was far less tolerant of preemptions than the other networks, but has recently eased its standards. The network would resort to purchasing stations for the sole purpose of switching or upgrading them to O&O status because of this (Miami's WTVJ and Salt Lake City's KUTV are two such examples) or would find independent stations to air NBC programs that the main affiliate did not air. In the case of KRON-TV, many of the shows it preempted ended up on independent KICU-TV. NBC had a somewhat contentious relationship with KRON-TV, especially since it often lost valuable advertising in one of the nation's largest markets. However, it had little reason to complain about its ratings performance in the Bay Area, as channel 4 was one of NBC's strongest affiliates for the better part of a half-century. A shuffle of network affiliations around the country (and NBC's acquisition of some stations in markets larger than San Francisco) in the mid-1990s made channel 4 NBC's largest affiliate.

=== Early prime time scheduling experiment ===
From February 1992 to September 1993, KRON-TV, along with KCRA-TV, participated in the "Early Prime" experiment in which prime time programs aired one hour earlier (mirroring the scheduling of the network's prime time lineup in the Central and Mountain time zones), the half-hour late evening newscast also moved from 11 to 10 p.m. as a result. While KRON-TV moved NBC's prime time programming back to the 8–11 p.m. timeslot in September 1993, CBS affiliate KPIX-TV, who adopted the early prime time schedule at the same time as KRON-TV, continued with the experiment until 1998—well after it had become owned by the network through CBS's 1994 acquisition by KPIX-TV's then-owner Westinghouse. Though both KRON-TV and KPIX-TV initially ran hour-long newscasts at 10 p.m. (KRON-TV switched to a half-hour within months), neither were able to beat Fox affiliate KTVU, due to that station's longtime dominance in the 10 o'clock hour that continues to this day.

=== Sports programming ===
In 1965, KRON-TV began broadcasting most Oakland Raiders games, which were at first part of the American Football League, which had a contract with NBC from 1965 to 1969, and then the National Football League's American Football Conference, which inherited the AFL's deal with NBC from 1970 to 1997 (the Raiders relocated to Los Angeles in 1982, stripping KRON-TV of its status as the team's home station until they returned to Oakland in 1995; the station then served as the unofficial home station until 1997). KRON-TV aired coverage of the Raiders' victories in Super Bowl XI and Super Bowl XV. In 2021, KRON-TV became the now Las Vegas Raiders' official Bay Area home station for pre-season games and special programming.

In addition, during those same years (1970–1997), KRON-TV also aired select San Francisco 49ers games whenever they played host to an AFC opponent at Candlestick Park (the station aired the team's victory in Super Bowl XXIII in January 1989).

In 1993, Channel 4 became the flagship station of the Oakland Athletics, after acquiring broadcast rights to the Major League Baseball team's games. This caused a problem in 1996, when the final day of the U.S. Olympic track and field trials conflicted with a scheduled Athletics broadcast. Since KRON-TV was contractually obligated to show the baseball game live, it rebroadcast the trials at midnight. KRON-TV lost the Athletics' television rights following the team's 1998 season. Both select Oakland A's and San Francisco Giants games were aired as part of NBC's broadcast contract with Major League Baseball from 1957 to 1989, including the A's string of three consecutive World Series victories in 1972, 1973, and 1974.

=== New Year's Live ===
From 1989 until January 2008, KRON-TV produced a countdown program called New Year's Live, which aired on New Year's Eve (sometimes beginning at 11 p.m.) and continued into New Year's Day (sometimes ending at 1 a.m.). Events in San Francisco were the focal point of KRON-TV's coverage, especially the midnight fireworks show near the Ferry Building. Other West Coast television stations joined KRON-TV in some years (including KCAL-TV in Los Angeles, KING-TV in Seattle, KCRA-TV in Sacramento, KNSD in San Diego and KLAS-TV in Las Vegas in December 1990), featuring midnight countdown events in other cities, such as Las Vegas casinos and at the Seattle Space Needle. Former KRON-TV weather anchor Mark Thompson served as the host during the program's early years. New Year's Live returned to KRON-TV in December 2010 as an hour-long broadcast, hosted by Catherine Heenan and George Rask in-studio, with live reports from Henry Tenenbaum at Pier 39 and Vicki Liviakis at Waterbar on the Embarcadero. Starting in 2011, Gary Radnich joined Heenan as host at various locations in San Francisco each year.

=== Other local programming ===
KRON-TV also produces two locally produced programs outside of local newscasts: Bay Area Living – Home Improvement Edition and LIVE! in the Bay. Past local programs include Bay Area Backroads, Bay Cafe, Henry's Home & Garden, Latin Eyes, Pacific Fusion, Bay Area Bargains, The Silver Lining; and several series and featured news segments that were developed by Jim Swanson, executive producer including Bay Area Bargains – Green Edition; Bay Area Living – Seniors Edition; KRON 4's Body Beautiful; KRON 4's Casino Adventures; Don't Invest and Forget; Health and Beauty with Dr Sonia; Living Green with Petersen Dean; KRON 4's Medical Mondays; KRON 4's Peninsula Beauty; KRON 4's Sizzling Hot Auto Deals and KRON 4's Spa Spectacular.

In the 1950s and 1960s, local programs produced by KRON-TV included the award-winning documentary series Assignment Four, Fireman Frank with George Lemont (died October 1985 at the age of 63) and his puppets (including a rooster named Rhode Island Red), and a live children's program hosted by Art Finley as Mayor Art. Bay Area kids, known as the "City Council," joined Mayor Art in the studio each day. The show featured Popeye cartoons mixed with science demonstrations, a newsreel feature entitled "Mayor Art's Almanac", games, prizes, and a sock puppet named "Ring-A-Ding."

Assignment Four was a documentary series that generally aired Monday evenings at 7 p.m. through much of the 1960s (beginning in February 1960). A promotional brochure declared, "each Assignment Four story is concerned with cultural and ethnic activities or perhaps some fascinating phase of life and living in the Greater San Francisco Bay Area." Subjects ranged from 'Skid Row' to 'The Single Girl,' the 'Green Intricate Country of Napa Valley' to 'No Deposit, No Return' (a study of garbage disposal that won a 1966 Emmy Award and Silver Medal Award in the 1966 New York International Film Festival). The documentary 'Not to Have Lived' (aired January 31, 1966) about mechanized society featured no dialogue or narration.

In the late 1980s, KRON-TV was among the few local television stations in the United States that produced a game show: Claim to Fame, a weekly half-hour program hosted by Patrick Van Horn that usually ran on Saturday evenings. During that timeframe, KRON-TV also produced a Saturday morning children's program called Buster and Me. From the 1970s into the late 1980s, the station used Gabriel Fauré's Pavane, Opus 50 as the music played during its nightly sign-off, alongside scenic rustic shots from around the Bay Area. KRON-TV also produced Bay Area Backroads, a half-hour program (which ran from the mid-1980s to 2008) that profiled places and people in the greater San Francisco Bay Area, and occasionally beyond. The program, which generally aired on Sunday evenings, featured hosts such as Jerry Graham and Doug McConnell.

=== News operation ===
KRON-TV's news logo, in use since 2024.

As of 2024, KRON-TV broadcasts 80 1/2 hours of local newscasts each week (with 14 1/2 hours each weekday, 3 1/2 hours on Saturdays, and 4 1/2 hours on Sundays); it has the highest newscast output of any television station in the San Francisco Bay Area. KRON-TV was one of only three MyNetworkTV affiliates that aired and produced their own newscasts, alongside WPHL-TV in Philadelphia (though only a morning newscast, while its 10 p.m. newscast is produced by WPVI-TV) and WJMN-TV in Marquette, Michigan (which maintained a news department when it was a CBS affiliate), after the service's owned-and-operated station WWOR-TV in Secaucus, New Jersey (whose news department operated separately from Fox-owned sister station WNYW stemming from license requirements imposed by WWOR's 1983 license transfer from New York City to New Jersey), closed theirs in July 2013.

KRON-TV's news operations were handled by the Chronicle until it launched its own news department in September 1957. It operated from a studio inside the Chronicle building at Fifth & Mission streets (the station's news department was located 30 feet from the Chronicle city desk). Appropriately for a station once owned by the Chronicle, KRON-TV has long been a very news-intensive station. it produced six daily newscasts at the time, including the Shell-sponsored 6 p.m. newscast Shell News, with Tom Franklin reporting from the studio at the Chronicle and in filmed field reports. Franklin began the broadcast standing next to a map of the San Francisco Bay Area, with lights illuminated on the map next to the various cities that the newscast was to feature stories from. Franklin anchored most of the program from behind a desk that had a large Shell logo next to a "Tom Franklin" nameplate, with a Shell "X-100" oil can that sat atop the desk. Live segments were used for late bulletins from the Chronicle city desk or for local and regional stories not suitable for film treatment. Some of the stories covered by Shell News in 1957 included the end of the "pedestrian scramble" system at downtown San Francisco street intersections, the end of the San Francisco-Oakland Southern Pacific railroad passenger ferry and the final game of the San Francisco Seals baseball team (to be replaced by the San Francisco Giants in 1958). In the 1960s, KRON-TV had anchors Art Brown and Jerry Jensen (who later moved to KGO-TV), and Linda Richards, who wrote predicted temperatures backwards on sliding glass panels with maps drawn on them, for viewers to see the weather forecast. Ed Hart, and later Frank Dill, reported sports with a focus on only the area's professional teams. KRON-TV's early morning news digests in the 1960s utilized sign language by Peter Wechsberg and Jane Norman.

KRON-TV eventually branded its newscasts as Newswatch 4 in the early 1970s. By early 1972, the station ran newscasts at noon, 5:30, 6:30 and 11 p.m. on weekdays and 6 and 11 p.m. on weekends; it also ran a late newscast that aired (then) immediately after The Tonight Show called the Newswatch Sign-Off Edition. Presenters then included Terry Lowry, Phil Wilson, Karna Small, Bob Marsden, Paul Ryan, Art Brown and Dave Valentine. The station's newscasts were branded as NewsCenter 4 from 1977 until 2001, when it was changed to the current KRON 4 News. A major change in KRON-TV's evening news broadcasts occurred on April 6, 1981, when the station launched the 90-minute newscast "Live on 4" (from 4 to 5:30 p.m.). NBC Nightly News also moved from 7 to 5:30 p.m. (KPIX-TV and KGO-TV would follow this move with their national newscasts during the following decade). From late 1981 to late 1988, the 5 p.m. weekday newscast was Live at Five; Bob Jimenez anchored in the studio with Evan White in the newsroom. Live on 4 was replaced in 1983 with T.G.I.4, an hour-long light local news and interview program co-hosted by Jan Rasmussen and Patrick Van Horn. In the mid-1980s, KRON-TV produced and aired an afternoon talk program called Bay City Limits.

In 1981, KRON-TV launched its first morning newscast with a seven-minute program (at 6:53 a.m.); the program was canceled by late 1982. All the evening newscasts featured a variety of anchors, until settling down with the successful duo of Roz Abrams and Jim Paymar. After Abrams left for New York City's WABC-TV in 1986, Paymar co-anchored alongside Sylvia Chase (who had been a correspondent for CBS News and later for the ABC newsmagazine 20/20). The station debuted what was then the only local early morning newscast in the San Francisco television market on September 1, 1986, with the launch of Daybreak (which ran from 6:30 to 7 a.m., leading into Today). The first anchors were Lloyd Patterson and Lila Petersen.

KRON-TV's newscasts during the 1980s regularly featured commentaries by Wayne Shannon in a segment called "Just 4 You", many of which had a humorous tone. Shannon received billing in newscast introductions along with the anchors, and weather and sports presenters. Another staple of KRON-TV newscasts in the 1980s was live traffic reports and news coverage from the station's helicopter "Telecopter 4". Bob McCarthy, Rita Cohen and Janice Huff were among the personalities who reported from Telecopter 4. Their traffic reports appeared regularly on Daybreak, during Today and Live at Five. Evocative of his folksy, down-to-earth style, McCarthy had a catchphrase, "hunky snarky", that he often used to characterize roads on which traffic was flowing smoothly. Will Prater was the main pilot of Telecopter 4 in its early years and Lou Calderon was the main photographer. KRON-TV also broadcast from remote locations during this era (e.g., Super Bowl venues) via a satellite uplink unit dubbed "Newstar 4". These segments often began with an animation depicting a signal originating from the uplink location, bouncing off a satellite and ending at a satellite dish next to the words "San Francisco." KRON-TV regarded the satellite truck as a major competitive advantage over rival television stations, featuring it in a mid-1980s promotional spot which declared, "We got a mobile satellite up-link. They don't."

In the 1980s, KRON-TV produced lengthy analysis pieces for the "Cover Story" segment on its 6 p.m. newscast, many with an investigative journalism focus and sometimes produced by the 10-person "Target 4" investigative unit. The station reran some of these segments in an occasional program called Cover Story Magazine. The station also produced a half-hour public affairs program on Sunday mornings called Weekend Extra, which was hosted by Belva Davis and Rollin Post. This program frequently presented features from KRON-TV's news bureaus in Washington, D.C., and Sacramento, the only Bay Area station to maintain bureaus (which were later deemed to be too expensive and were shut down by the end of the decade). During this time, KRON-TV news grew rapidly in viewership and collected a large number of awards, including two DuPont Columbia awards, a Peabody, and more than 100 local Emmys. The station also produced a series of one-minute documentaries during the mid-1980s, San Francisco Minutes and Bay Area Minutes, which featured people, places and events in San Francisco and Bay Area history and usually featured narrations by KRON-TV personalities set to soaring music (e.g., Mark Thompson on San Francisco's cable cars, Lloyd Patterson on the San Mateo County coastline).

In the 1990s, the station utilized a "24 Hour News" format, with 30- to 60-second news updates each hour outside of regular newscasts. During the May 2001 sweeps period – its last as an NBC affiliate – KRON-TV's newscasts beat KGO-TV's in the 5 and 6 p.m. timeslots by a very close margin, ending KGO-TV's domination in those timeslots. When KRON-TV lost NBC to KNTV and became an independent station in January 2002, the station expanded its news programming by adding two hours to its weekday morning newscast (from 7 to 9 a.m.), and extending its 5 p.m. newscast to one hour to fill timeslots vacated by the departures of Today and Nightly News.

Unlike most news-producing stations that have become independent after losing a network affiliation or that have switched to one of the post-1986 broadcast networks, KRON originally kept its late newscast in the 11 p.m. timeslot instead of moving it to or adding one at 10 p.m. (avoiding direct competition with KTVU's long-dominant prime time newscast, though KRON's late news remained in competition against KGO-TV, KNTV and KPIX-TV's late evening newscasts); the station also added a prime time newscast at 9 p.m. To this day, KRON-TV maintains a newscast schedule similar to the one it had as an NBC affiliate. It is the only MyNetworkTV affiliate that has ever maintained a news schedule mirroring that of a Big Three affiliate (as it carries morning, 5 p.m., and 6 p.m. newscasts, and previously an 11 p.m. newscast). Several of KRON-TV's veteran anchors and reporters left the station after the loss of the NBC affiliation; KRON-TV also began incorporating video journalists (many of which were newer hires) to report, tape and edit news stories.

Despite the overall decline of KRON-TV as an independent, its newscasts initially pulled in respectable ratings though viewership was lower than it was before the station lost its NBC affiliation. During the February 2004 sweeps period, the station placed second in the ratings behind KTVU. However, KRON-TV's news viewership has gradually fallen since that point; also in 2004, the station posted an 8.7% market share, down from the 21% share it had as an NBC affiliate. The 9 p.m. newscast created after becoming independent eventually fell to fourth place by 2005. In March 2006, KRON-TV's morning newscast posted an average viewership of approximately 28,000 viewers. By 2009, overall viewership for the station's newscasts had fallen to fifth place among the Bay Area's news-producing English-language television stations.

On September 17, 2007, KRON-TV became the third station in the Bay Area (behind KGO-TV and KTVU) to begin broadcasting its local newscasts in 16:9 widescreen—albeit in standard definition. In September 2008, KRON-TV dropped its 5 p.m. newscast after the syndicated daytime talk show Dr. Phil was moved to the slot, the program's former 8 p.m. timeslot (which Dr. Phil held locally since the show's 2002 premiere) was replaced by an hour-long prime time newscast; this would be undone in September 2009, with the cancellation of the 8 p.m. newscast and Dr. Phil's return to the 8 p.m. slot, along with the reinstatement of a 5:30 p.m. newscast (which expanded back to 5 p.m. by 2010). The 8 p.m. newscast returned on May 30, 2011, concurrent with the replacement of the 4 p.m. news with Dr. Phil. KRON quietly upgraded its newscasts to high definition in April 2012, with the debut of new graphics. As of September 2013, only studio segments and on-air graphics are presented in HD, footage from field cameras and other news sources continue to be broadcast in widescreen SD until July 2016.

KRON-TV launched a new 10 p.m. newscast on May 16, 2016, that competes with newscasts on KTVU and, at that time, KBCW. However, also at that time, KRON-TV's 11 p.m. news was shortened to 15 minutes until it was dropped when KRON-TV launched a new 9 p.m. newscast on August 21, 2017, which competed with KGO-TV's 9 p.m. newscast for KOFY-TV until KGO-TV canceled it. On September 14, 2020, KRON-TV launched a 3 p.m. newscast. In February 2019, KRON-TV launched a 24-hour online news stream and app called KRONOn. On January 10, 2022, KRON-TV launched a noon newscast that competes with KTVU and KPIX-TV. On May 9, 2023, KRON-TV announced that the 4 a.m. hour of KRON 4 Morning News would be dropped, making 5 a.m. the start of the program, and the launch of the 10 a.m. hour on May 22, 2023. On September 1, 2023 (after switching affiliates to The CW), KRON-TV launched a 2 p.m. newscast and readded its 11 p.m. newscast, ending its 8 p.m. and 9 p.m. newscasts as a result (then the 9 p.m. newscast returned on October 1, 2025 on KRON 4+). On June 3, 2024 (after 13 years), KRON-TV readded its 4 p.m. newscast. On September 30, 2025, KRON-TV aired its final weeknight 11 p.m. newscast and replaced with the half-hour version of Sports Night Live the following day, while the station continues to produce 11 p.m. newscasts on weekends.

On October 21, 2020, KRON-TV unveiled a newly renovated studio during its 5 p.m. newscast. On October 1, 2024, KRON-TV debuted new graphics to commemorate the station's 75th anniversary.

From July to December 2024, KRON-TV simulcasted two hours of news programming from its KRONOn streaming service weeknights from 11:30 p.m. to 1:30 a.m.

==== Notable current on-air staff ====
- Catherine Heenan – anchor / reporter

==== Notable former on-air staff ====
- Roz Abrams – anchor (1982–1985)
- Cheryl Casone – reporter (2002–2004)
- Steve Centanni – reporter (1989–1996)
- Sylvia Chase – anchor (1986–1990)
- Claudia Cowan – reporter (1995–1998)
- Art Finley – children's show host (as "Mayor Art"); host of Pick A Show (c. 1966); reporter (1959–1968)
- Pat Finn – weatherman
- Michelle Franzen – reporter and fill-in anchor (1998–2001)
- Emil Guillermo – reporter (1982–1989)
- John Hambrick – (1975–1980)
- Janice Huff – meteorologist (1990–1994)
- Marc Jampole – reporter (1980–1981)
- Vic Lee – reporter (1972–2006)
- Sam Chu Lin – reporter (1981–1984)
- Dave Malkoff – reporter (2003–2004)
- Mark Mullen – morning anchor (1991–1995, 2002–2003)
- Soledad O'Brien – reporter (1993–1996)
- Jim Paymar – anchor (1982–1987)
- Gary Radnich – sports director (1985–2018)
- Wayne Shannon – commentator (1982–1988)
- Ray Taliaferro – anchor (1972–1977)
- Mark Thompson – chief weather anchor (1984–1990)
- Wendy Tokuda – anchor/reporter (1997–2007)
- Patrick Van Horn – co-host of T.G.I.4. (1983–198?), host of Claim to Fame (1985–1989)
- Marta Waller – freelance writer (1984)
- Pete Wilson – anchor/reporter (1990–2001)
- Emerald Yeh – anchor (1984–2003)

== Technical information ==
=== Subchannels ===
The station's ATSC 1.0 channels are carried on the multiplexed signals of other Bay Area television stations:

Subchannels provided by KRON-TV (ATSC 1.0)
Subchannel	Res.	Short name	Programming	ATSC 1.0 host
4.1	720p	KRON-TV	The CW	KTVU
4.2	480i	Antenna	Antenna TV (4:3)	KNTV
4.3	480i	Rewind	Rewind TV	KPYX
4.4	480i	Roar	Roar	KPYX
4.5	480i	DEFY	Defy	KGO-TV

=== Analog-to-digital conversion ===
KRON-TV shut down its analog signal, over VHF channel 4, on June 12, 2009, as part of the federally mandated transition from analog to digital television. The station's digital signal moved from its transition period UHF channel 57, which was among the high band UHF channels (52–69) that were removed from broadcasting use as a result of the transition, to UHF channel 38, using virtual channel 4.

On March 29, 2020, KRON-TV moved from UHF channel 38 to VHF channel 7.

=== ATSC 3.0 ===
At 10:01 a.m. on March 29, 2023, KRON-TV turned on its new Rhode & Schwarz transmitter at Sutro Tower and began its status as an ATSC 3.0 lighthouse for the San Francisco Bay Area. Two days before, four of the stations participating in the ATSC 3.0 lighthouse began broadcasting KRON-TV's main channel and subchannels as listed above to clear RF channel 7 for ATSC 3.0 use. Prior to the 2024 Summer Olympics in Paris, KNTV upgraded its ATSC 3.0 signal to both Dolby Vision HDR and Dolby Atmos audio (as well as adding a broadcast application allowing viewers to see weather radar or restart a program), taking advantage of technologies not available on the ATSC 1.0 signal.

Subchannels of KRON-TV (ATSC 3.0)
Subchannel	Res.	Short name	Programming
2.1	720p	KTVU-HD	Fox (KTVU)
4.1	1080p	KRON-TV	The CW
5.1	1080p	KPIX-TV	CBS (KPIX-TV)
7.1	720p	KGO-HD	ABC (KGO-TV)
11.1	1080p	KNTV	NBC (KNTV)
14.1	720p	KDTV-TV	Univision (KDTV-DT)

Subchannel broadcast with digital rights management

== Defunct news services ==
=== BayTV ===
BayTV debuted on July 4, 1994, as a 24-hour cable news channel that was operated by KRON-TV in association with AT&T Broadband (now Comcast Xfinity). BayTV was carried on cable channel 35. The KRON-TV news staff also provided local news updates on MSNBC and CNN Headline News on Bay Area cable systems during this period. KRON-TV's now-defunct 9 p.m. newscast originally debuted on BayTV in the late 1990s and lasted until the cable channel ceased operations on August 30, 2001. The 9 p.m. newscast was revived on channel 4 following KRON-TV's transition to an independent station in January 2002, though it was moved to 8 p.m. when it affiliated with MyNetworkTV on September 5, 2006. The channel's daily Silicon Valley news recap New Media News also aired nationally on Jones Media Group cable channel Mind Extension University/Knowledge TV until that channel shut down in 2000.

=== KRON 4 24/7 Bay Area News Channel ===
On July 26, 2012, KRON-TV launched another 24-hour local news and weather channel, called the KRON 4 24/7 Bay Area News Channel. The channel featured news, local weather and traffic updates using the common screen template and setup shared among all of Young's automated weather/news information subchannels. Unlike the cable-exclusive BayTV, it was carried locally on over-the-air digital subchannel 4.2, on cable through Comcast Xfinity channel 193, and was streamed on KRON-TV's website. The over-the-air channel was replaced by Sky Link TV on September 29, 2015, and the online live stream was shut down on the same date.
