= Philadelphia Association of Black Journalists =

The Philadelphia Association of Black Journalists (PABJ), formerly the Association of Black Journalists (ABJ), is an organization formed in June 1974 to advocate for a fair representation of Black journalists in the city’s mainstream media. It was composed of journalists and television and radio stations.

== Formation ==
Black journalists formed the Association of Black Journalists (ABJ), as it was originally named, several months before publicizing its existence in a press release in October 1974. A spokesman told the Philadelphia Daily News that it was founded in June 1974 and its stated purpose was to “encourage more Blacks to enter the media, sensitize the white media for more balanced coverage of Black events and develop closer ties with other Black professional groups.”

The organization had identified 76 Black newspeople in the Greater Philadelphia area, and it had about 50 members. ABJ met monthly at the Institute of Black Ministries in North Philadelphia.

The press release named the officers and executive board:

- Chuck Stone (Philadelphia Daily News), president
- Pam Haynes (Philadelphia Tribune), vice president
- Sam Pressley (Philadelphia Evening Bulletin), secretary
- George Strait (WPVI-TV), treasurer
- James C. Johnson (Philadelphia Evening Bulletin), assistant treasurer

The Executive Board:

- Claude Lewis (Philadelphia Evening Bulletin), chairman of the Executive Board
- Francine Cheeks (WCAU-TV)
- Joe Donovan (KYW radio)
- Artis Hall (WCAU-TV)
- Carole Norris (WHYY-TV)

On December 15, 1975, member J. Whyatt “Jerry” Mondesire of the Philadelphia Inquirer filed Articles of Incorporation papers for the ABJ as a non-profit, three days after the founding of the National Association of Black Journalists (NABJ). The request was approved by the state of Pennsylvania in January 1976. The document changed its name to the Association of Black Journalists of Philadelphia.

Its early membership was restricted to working journalists, photographers and students, and was eventually expanded to include media professionals. Prior to the founding of the ABJ, an organization of media professionals was organized as Black Communicators Inc. in 1971.

== NABJ ==
Several PABJ members were among the 44 Black journalists from across the country who met in Washington, DC, to form NABJ on December 12, 1975. They included Reginald "Reggie" Bryant, Chuck Stone, Acel Moore, Claude Lewis, Joe Davidson, Sandra Dawson (Long Weaver). Stone was elected president, and he served a dual presidency of both the NABJ and ABJ. In a news story in 1995, Stone described the NABJ as a “direct descendant” of ABJ and ABJ’s constitution and bylaws as a model for the NABJ’s.

Three of PABJ’s 25 presidents have become presidents of NABJ: Stone, Vanessa Williams and Sarah Glover.

== First project ==
ABJ held a meeting in September 1974 between PABJ member Moore and representatives of the Temple University School of Communications and Theater to discuss the hiring of Black newspeople. Temple accepted ABJ’s assistance. ABJ offered to visit nearby colleges, including Lincoln University and Cheyney State College, and local high schools.

According to Stone, the ABJ group decided to approach Temple for its 20 percent Black student population. Stone accused the university of having no Black faculty members, but a former Temple journalism department dean pushed back.

In 1970, a professor in Temple’s communications school found in two surveys of newspapers across the country that the number of Blacks was under two percent.

== Early programming ==
ABJ and Temple cooperated in a journalism-training session for high school students in 1977. The organization held annual awards banquets to raise money for scholarships and operations. Another of its programs was "Artists Among Us," begun in 2002, which brought together journalists to show off their talents beyond journalism. Among the presenters was cartoonist Robb Armstrong, who created the Black comic strip "Jump Start." The organization later offered candidate forums and other events.

The first awards banquet was held on February 28, 1976, with Benjamin C. Hooks, commissioner of the Federal Communications Commission, as speaker. Then Sen. Hubert H. Humphrey dropped by and gave a short speech. The ABJ logo designed by member Earl E. Davis and a banner sewn by Violet B. Johnson, wife of member Tyree Johnson (who would become the third president), were unveiled.

ABJ presented the Orrin Evans/Art Peters Journalism Award to Black New York photographer James Van Der Zee and the ABJ Award for Continuing Excellence to attorney Charles W. Bowser. During the 1930s and 1940s, Evans was one of the first Black reporters to work for white-owned newspapers and was considered the dean of Black journalists. In the early 1970s, Peters wrote a column in The Philadelphia Inquirer.

The second banquet was held on February 26, 1977, and Vernon Jordan, president of the National Urban League, was the guest speaker.

ABJ presented awards to CBS correspondent Ed Bradley and the Rev. Paul Washington, an activist rector at the Church of the Advocate.

Atlanta Mayor Maynard Jackson was the speaker at the February 25, 1978, banquet. Operation Push leader Jesse Jackson, Congressman Walter Fauntroy and actor Oscar Brown Jr. made an appearance. Percy Qoboza, an anti-apartheid editor at South Africa’s largest Black newspaper, received the Orrin Evans-Art Peters Journalism Award. Housing advocate Shirley Dennis was presented the ABJ Award for Continuing Excellence.

The organization held its first career conference in 1979.

== “Black Perspective on the News” ==
In 1973, Moore and Bryant began hosting and co-producing “Black Perspective on the News” on WHYY-TV as a local news-analysis program. In August 1974, it went national on PBS. ABJ members were among those who participated in the interviews.

The fact that there are two societies, two lifestyles,… Black and white, and the unique position of the Black journalist as participant in both, is probably the most exciting concept behind the program,” Moore said in a newspaper article in 1973. “This program affords the journalists on the panel the opportunity to ask questions from their own unique positions, from ‘two sides’ as it were, and this broad basis is what makes the program important to Black and white audiences.

The program was created as a local show in 1968 by Lionel J. Monagas, who was the first Black professional hired at WHYY-TV. In the early 1970s, it was hosted by Jimmy McDonald, who was among the 1961 Freedom Riders. The show was seen in 32 cities.

Before becoming a part of “Black Perspective,” Moore and Lewis, along with Haynes, had appeared as contributing reporters on a local-news analysis program at KYW-TV in 1971 called “Black Edition.” Its hosts were Malcolm Poindexter, Jesse Brown and Trudy Haynes.
