= Jack Jones (TV journalist) =

American television journalist (1949–1991)

John Wesley Claver "Jack" Jones
- Born: November 12, 1949; Philadelphia, Pennsylvania, U.S.
- Died: March 5, 1991 (aged 41); Merion Station, Pennsylvania, U.S.
- Burial place: West Laurel Hill Cemetery, Bala Cynwyd, Pennsylvania, U.S.
- Occupations: Television reporter, journalist and broadcaster

John Wesley Claver "Jack" Jones (November 12, 1949 – March 5, 1991), was an American journalist and the first African-American news anchor in the Philadelphia television market. He was the first television news anchor to be born, raised, and educated in Philadelphia. He was posthumously inducted into the Broadcast Pioneers of Philadelphia Hall of Fame in 2004.

== Early life and education ==
He was born November 12, 1949, in Philadelphia, Pennsylvania. He graduated from West Philadelphia Catholic High School and summa cum laude with a bachelors degree in English from La Salle University. He received a masters degree in education from the University of Pennsylvania in 1973.

== Career ==
Jones joined WCAU-TV as a copy editor in 1967. He was mentored by veteran journalist John Facenda. Promoted to the position of weekend booth announcer, he became a reporter in 1971. He eventually rose to the position of news anchor during the 11 p.m. time slot, but was replaced by Ralph Penza in 1976. He moved to KYW-TV and then moved on to WLS-TV in Chicago, but returned to KYW-TV in 1983.

Described by KYW-TV weatherman Tom Lamaine in 1991 as "a profile in courage and encouragement to those who" were "afflicted with cancer," Jack Jones was also praised by longtime Philadelphia mayor Frank Rizzo, who said, "I was absolutely amazed at his courage—at what he did and how he did it." Rizzo also said that Jones "asked tough questions, but he did it with class." According to veteran Philadelphia news anchor Larry Kane, Jones "loved to cover politics" and "was able to get a lot of stories that other people couldn't get."

== Illness and death ==
Ailing by 1989 but not diagnosed with pancreatic cancer until the fall of 1990, Jones continued to work on air at KYW-TV as he underwent chemotherapy treatment for the disease. He completed his final broadcast on February 2, 1991, during which time he "received intravenous medication as he co-anchored the 6 p.m. news" on KYW-TV, according to the Philadelphia Daily News. Just over a month later, he succumbed to cancer-related complications, and died at his home in Merion Station, Pennsylvania on March 5, 1991. He was interred at West Laurel Hill Cemetery in Bala Cynwyd, Pennsylvania.

== Personal life ==
He was married to Susan and had two step-daughters, Gina and Lisa Delaplanque.

== Awards and legacy ==
In 1987, Jones was nominated for individual achievement (writer/news) by the Philadelphia chapter of the National Academy of Television Arts & Sciences. The Broadcast Pioneers of Philadelphia posthumously inducted Jones into their Hall of Fame in 2004.
