= Natasha Brown =

American news anchor and reporter

Natasha Brown is an anchor and reporter at KYW-TV in Philadelphia. She reports for the station's CBS News Philadelphia on weeknights and is the current sole anchor of CBS News Philadelphia @ Noon taking over in January 2026 after Jim Donovan retired from the station the previous month, and CBS News Philadelphia @ 4pm. Brown became sole anchor of the 4 p.m. newscast in October 2026 when Siafa Lewis, who joined her in November 2021 from Chicago station WMAQ-TV, departed the station just shy of marking 5 years there. She is also the co-anchor at 5 p.m. with Ukee Washington. She joined the station in December 2002 as morning anchor and reporter. She is also host of Speak Up, a public affairs program on WPSG. She graduated from James Madison University, where she earned a Bachelor of Arts degree in Communications. Prior to joining KYW, she worked as a reporter at WPXI-TV in Pittsburgh, Pennsylvania. She previously worked as weekend anchor and reporter at WWBT in Richmond, Virginia. Brown began her career as a reporter at WPDE-TV in Myrtle Beach, South Carolina.

Brown has received three Emmy Awards for her excellence in reporting, and was inducted in 2016 to the Broadcast Pioneers of Philadelphia hall of fame. NAACP awarded her the Most Influential Black Woman twice.
