= The Neighborhood Leader =

Defunct weekly African-American newspaper based in Philadelphia, Pennsylvania

- Neighborhood Leader from 2011
- Type: Weekly newspaper
- Format: Paper
- Publisher: Jaramogi Communications
- Editor: Heshimu Jaramogi
- Headquarters: 2227 N Broad St; Philadelphia, PA 19132
- Circulation: 60,000

The Neighborhood Leader was a weekly African-American newspaper based in Philadelphia, Pennsylvania. It was founded in 1994 by Heshimu Jaramogi, former president of the Philadelphia Association of Black Journalists. Jaramogi was publisher of the paper, and also wrote articles and took photographs. In 2011 the newspaper partnered with several other newspapers and radio stations to examine the effects of a 2008 stop-and-frisk policy on the West Philadelphia community.
