= Walt Hunter =

American investigative reporter

Walt Hunter (born May 7, 1949) is a Philadelphia native and an investigative reporter with KYW-TV. He joined the station in 1980 as a crime reporter and was named best television reporter by Philadelphia Magazine in 2004. He has received eight Philadelphia Emmy Awards.

The Broadcast Pioneers of Philadelphia inducted Hunter into their Hall of Fame in 2007.
