= Jerry Taft =

American meteorologist (1943–2020)

- Born: March 14, 1943
- Died: July 23, 2020 (aged 77); Chicago, Illinois
- Education: University of Wisconsin–Madison
- Years active: 1976–2018

Jerry Taft (March 14, 1943 – July 23, 2020) was an American meteorologist and weather presenter who served as chief meteorologist for WLS-TV in Chicago. He worked for 34 years with WLS, and for 42 years as a broadcast meteorologist in the Chicago media market.

== Early life ==
Taft spent one year at Georgia Tech, before working as radar technician for the United States Air Force in Iowa. After studying at Wartburg College for one year, he got accepted into the Airman Education and Commissioning Program, which sent him to the University of Wisconsin–Madison. During his time there, he became a pilot and fought in the Vietnam War for a year. He eventually obtained a Bachelor of Science degree in meteorology from that institution in 1969. He revealed that he had not initially aspired to be a television meteorologist. His interest in the area was piqued during his time as a military pilot, when he was involved in a TV feature, flying with San Antonio weatherman Maclovio Perez of NBC affiliate KMOL-TV.

== Career ==
Taft worked at KMOL-TV (now WOAI-TV) before moving to Chicago. He worked for 7 years at WMAQ-TV, Chicago's NBC affiliate, then joined WLS-TV (ABC 7) in August 1984.

Taft also performed radio work, providing weather reports for WMAQ-AM and WLS-AM in the 1980s.

The Chicago Tribune described Taft as "one of [their] favorite weathermen". He finished second to WBBM-TV's Steve Baskerville and ahead of Tom Skilling in a 1997 Chicago Sun-Times reader poll about Chicago meteorologists. Participants noted Taft's "no-nonsense delivery".

On December 20, 2017, ABC 7 Chicago announced that Taft would retire in January 2018. Taft's last day on air, after forecasting weather on Chicago television for 42 years, was Friday, January 19, 2018.

== Personal life ==
Taft was 19 when he married his high school sweetheart; they had their first child not long afterwards.

According to the Chicago Sun-Times, Taft moved to Naples, Florida after his retirement with ABC 7 Chicago and worked as a part-time Uber driver. He earned $84.61 on his first day.

Taft died on July 23, 2020, in Chicago, at the age of 77. He is survived by his wife Shana. His children are Skylar, Storm, Danna and Jay.
