= Little Italy, Wilmington, Delaware =

Little Italy
- Neighborhood of Wilmington
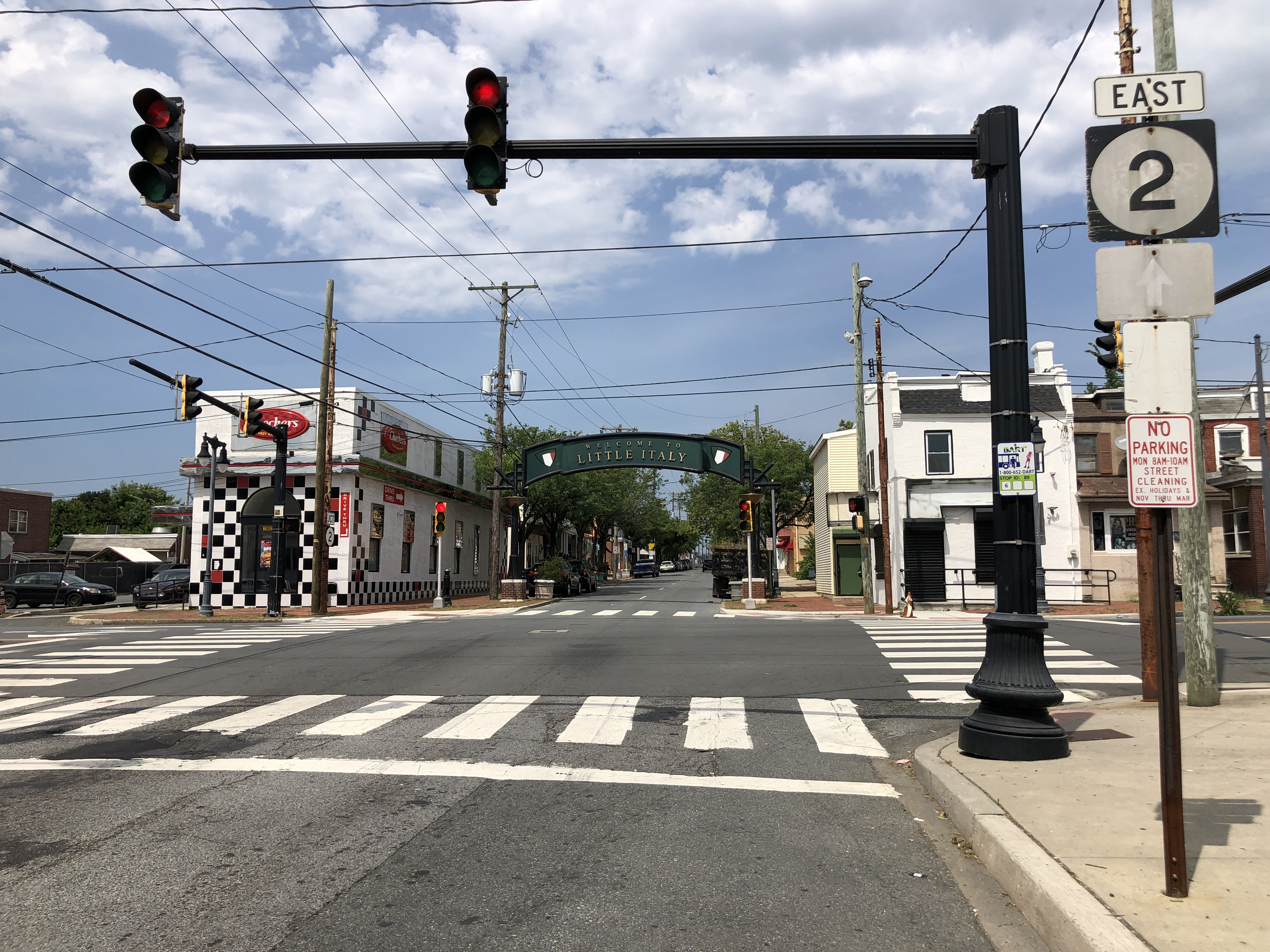
- Archway entering Little Italy

- Location within Delaware
- Coordinates: 39.7520°N 75.5682°W
- Country: United States
- State: Delaware
- City: Wilmington
- Named for: Italian-American ethnic heritage

Little Italy is a neighborhood on the west side of Wilmington, Delaware.

Little Italy is bounded roughly by 4th Street to the south, Union Street to the west, Clayton Street to the east, and Pennsylvania Avenue to the north. Like other neighborhoods with the "Little Italy" designation, Little Italy has a large Italian-American population. There are several Italian-American owned and operated businesses, including restaurants, law firms, and photographers located in Little Italy.

One of the central features of Little Italy is St. Anthony of Padua Roman Catholic Church, which also includes a grade school and the Padua Academy, located outside of Little Italy but nearby on Wilmington's west side. St. Anthony's also hosts the Italian Festival, a week-long festival which takes place annually in June and celebrates Italian culture through food, music, a midway with rides and games, and games of chance generally found next to the church building.

== Filmography ==
In 2010, a 78 minute documentary about the history of Little Italy and St. Anthony's Church titled Bells On The Hill was released. The premiere screening sold out four days in advance at the local independent venue Theatre N. The film was written and directed by Gus Parodi and Matt Swift.

== Transportation ==
Little Italy is surrounded by Pennsylvania Avenue to the north and Lancaster Avenue to the south, with both of them connecting to I-95 and DE Route 141, both just east and west of Little Italy respectively.
