= Robin Mackintosh =

- Occupation: Journalist

Robin Mackintosh is a U.S. journalist, who worked as an Eyewitness News reporter for CBS 3 in Philadelphia from 1970 until his retirement in 2008.

== Career ==
Mackintosh began his career at the Philadelphia Evening Bulletin, where he worked as a copy supervisor in the editorial department from 1964 to 1968. He moved to the Virgin Islands in 1969 to work as a reporter for The Virgin Islands Daily News.

He joined CBS 3 in Philadelphia in September 1970, after three years as a news writer for sister station KYW Newsradio.

Mackintosh won a Philadelphia Emmy Award in 1986 for feature reporting, a Pennsylvania Associated Press Broadcasters Association Award for spot news and, in 1983, a special honor presented by President Ronald Reagan at the White House for a series on volunteerism.

In December 2006, Mackintosh became the longest serving street reporter in Philadelphia after the retirement of NBC 10's Bill Baldini. On July 30, 2008, Robin Mackintosh gave his last on-air report from Love Park in Philadelphia.

Mackintosh was inducted into the Broadcast Pioneers of Philadelphia Hall of Fame in 2012.
