= Carlton Jones Lake =

American choral conductor

- Born: July 20, 1923; Kingston, Pennsylvania
- Died: January 6, 1998 (aged 74); Philadelphia, Pennsylvania
- Occupation: Choral conductor
- Known for: Founding All Philadelphia Elementary School Boys Choir

Carlton Jones Lake (1923-1998) was an internationally known choral conductor and music educator.

== Early life ==
Lake was born on July 20, 1923 in Kingston, Pennsylvania, of Welsh parents, the late Ellen Jones and Isaac Lake. He was raised in the Wyoming Valley of Pennsylvania where he was surrounded by the choral traditions and festivals of Welsh culture. Lake had performed with his choirs throughout the world.

== Career ==
He founded the All Philadelphia Elementary School Boys Choir in 1961 (which is now called Philadelphia Boys Choir & Chorale) and conducted that choir at the International Eisteddfod in Llangollen, Wales in 1968. He then founded the internationally known Academy Boys Choir (1968–1989), and the Performing Arts School of Philadelphia, from which he retired as director in 1985. Lake led the Academy Boys Choir on international tours of Jamaica (1974), and London, Paris, the Netherlands, Austria and Wales (1972, 1977, 1983), including multiple appearances at the Eisteddfod in Llangollen, Wales. In 1972, the choir released an album and starred in CBS's Christmas Eve at Christ Church, which was repeated every year until 1977. They also performed for President Gerald Ford on July 4, 1976, at Valley Forge and Independence Hall as part of that year's bicentennial celebrations.

== Performances ==
Other highlights included performances with the Philadelphia Orchestra and guest conductor Claudio Abbado at the Academy of Music, annual performances of Arthur Honegger's A Christmas Cantata at First Baptist Church, and an all-boys production of Gilbert & Sullivan's one-act operetta Trial by Jury. Lake received the Doctor of Music degree in 1961 from the Philadelphia College of Performing Arts (now the University of the Arts). He was a founding Director of the Performing Arts School, Philadelphia College of Performing Arts. Lake became widely known as an outstanding conductor of the Cymanfaoedd Ganu (hymn sings) throughout the Welsh communities of the Middle Atlantic States and was chosen to conduct the 57th Welsh National Gymanfa Ganu in Baltimore in 1988. He was the first American born conductor of this event.

== Awards ==
In 1989 the Welsh Society of Philadelphia awarded him the "Robert Morris Award" for Distinguished Accomplishment in Music and Welsh Scholarship. He was also the recipient of "The Welsh Heritage Medal at the National Welsh Heritage Foundation.

== Death ==
Lake died January 6, 1998, at Pennsylvania Hospital, Philadelphia.
