= St. Anthony's Roman Catholic Church (Wilmington, Delaware) =

Historic church in Delaware, United States

- U.S. National Register of Historic Places
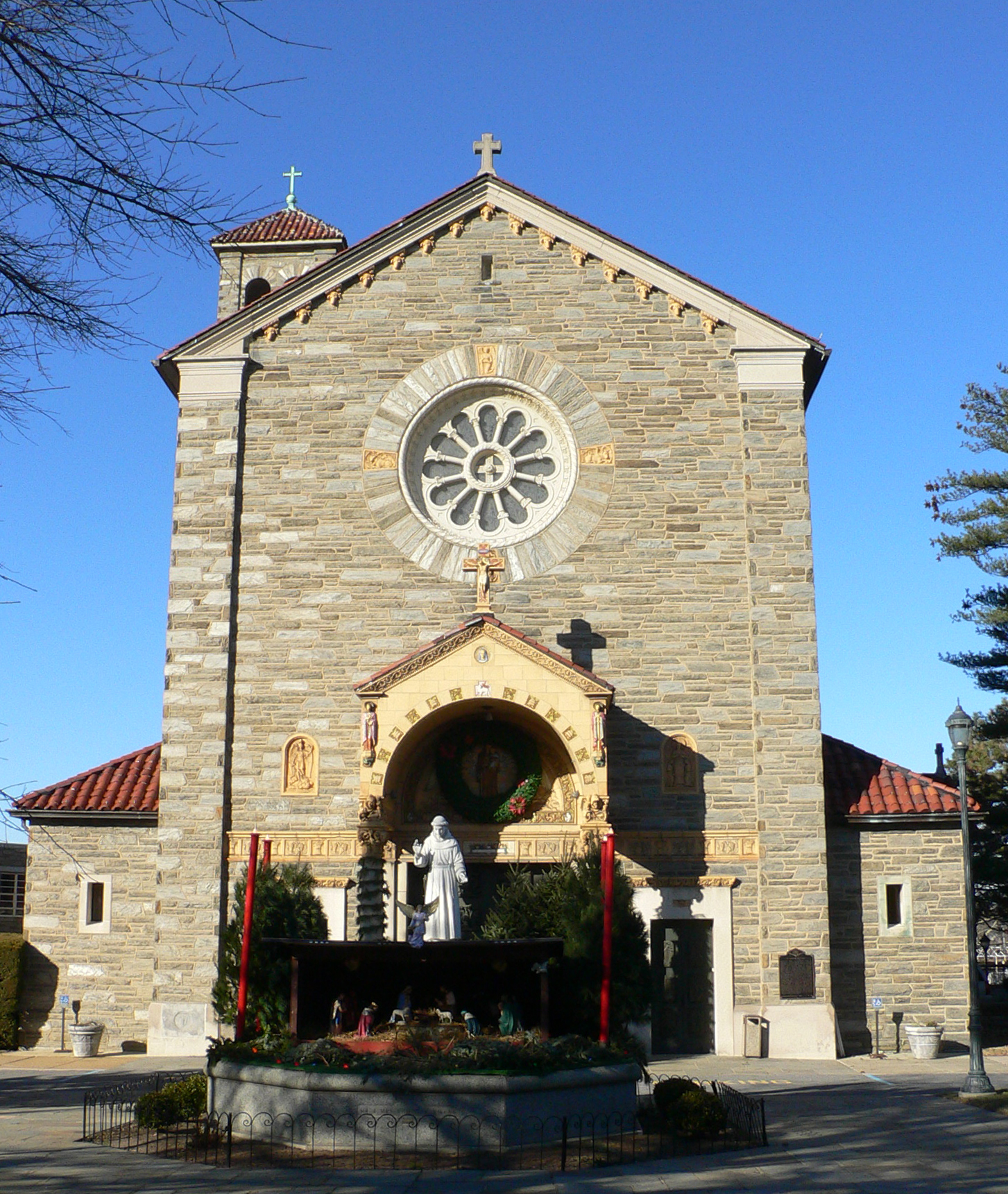
- The entrance to the main church building sanctuary.

- Location within Delaware Location within the United States
- Location: West 9th & North DuPont Streets, Wilmington, Delaware
- Coordinates: 39.752593°N 75.566747°W
- Area: 1 acre (0.40 ha)
- Built: 1924
- Architectural style: Romanesque Revival
- NRHP reference No.: 84000851
- Added to NRHP: May 3, 1984

St. Anthony of Padua Roman Catholic Church is a Catholic parish in Wilmington, Delaware. Named in honor of Anthony of Padua, it falls within the jurisdiction of the Diocese of Wilmington and is operated by the Oblates of St. Francis de Sales. It is situated in Wilmington's Little Italy neighborhood, where the parish includes St. Anthony's School (adjacent to the church) and Padua Academy.

Every June, the church runs an Italian Festival, a week-long event which celebrates the Feast of Saint Anthony. This festival features four outdoor cafes, each with their own live entertainment, and unique food selections. The Festival is the second-largest of its kind in the United States. Admission fees were established for the first time in 2008.

The Romanesque Revival architectural style owes its inspiration to the Basilica di San Zeno in Verona, Italy. Italian immigrants who settled in the area took seven years to construct the building. Construction was led by Ernesto DiSabatino, founder of Ernest DiSabatino and Sons, originally a stone masonry company which evolved throughout the 20th century into a general contracting company and was the precursor to the current EDiS Construction management concern, still located in Wilmington DE. DiSabatino received the Papal Cross of Honor Pro Ecclesia et Pontifice for his efforts for the construction of the church.

The church was listed on the National Register of Historic Places in 1984.

== Gallery ==
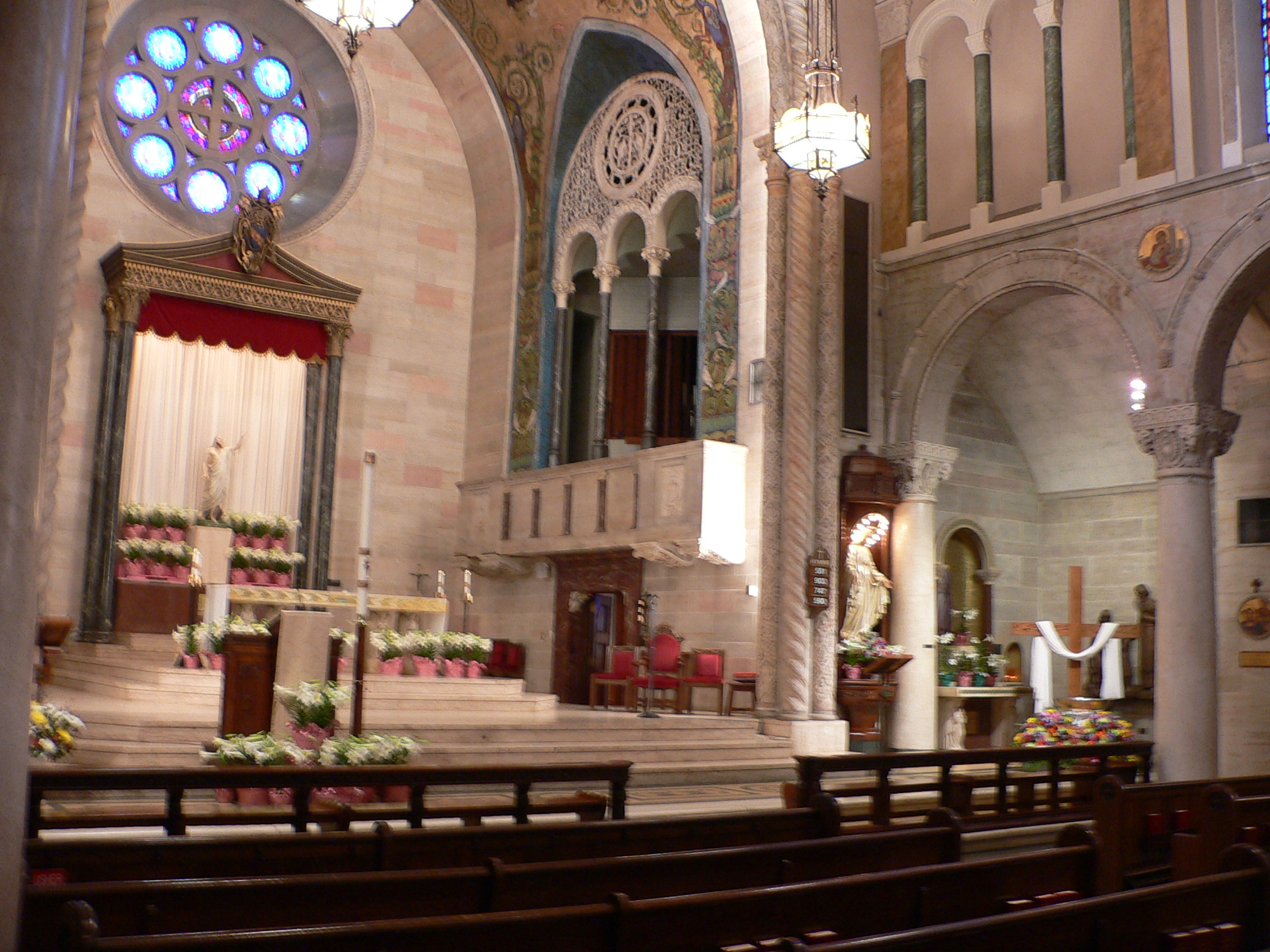
The altar and pulpit of the Church

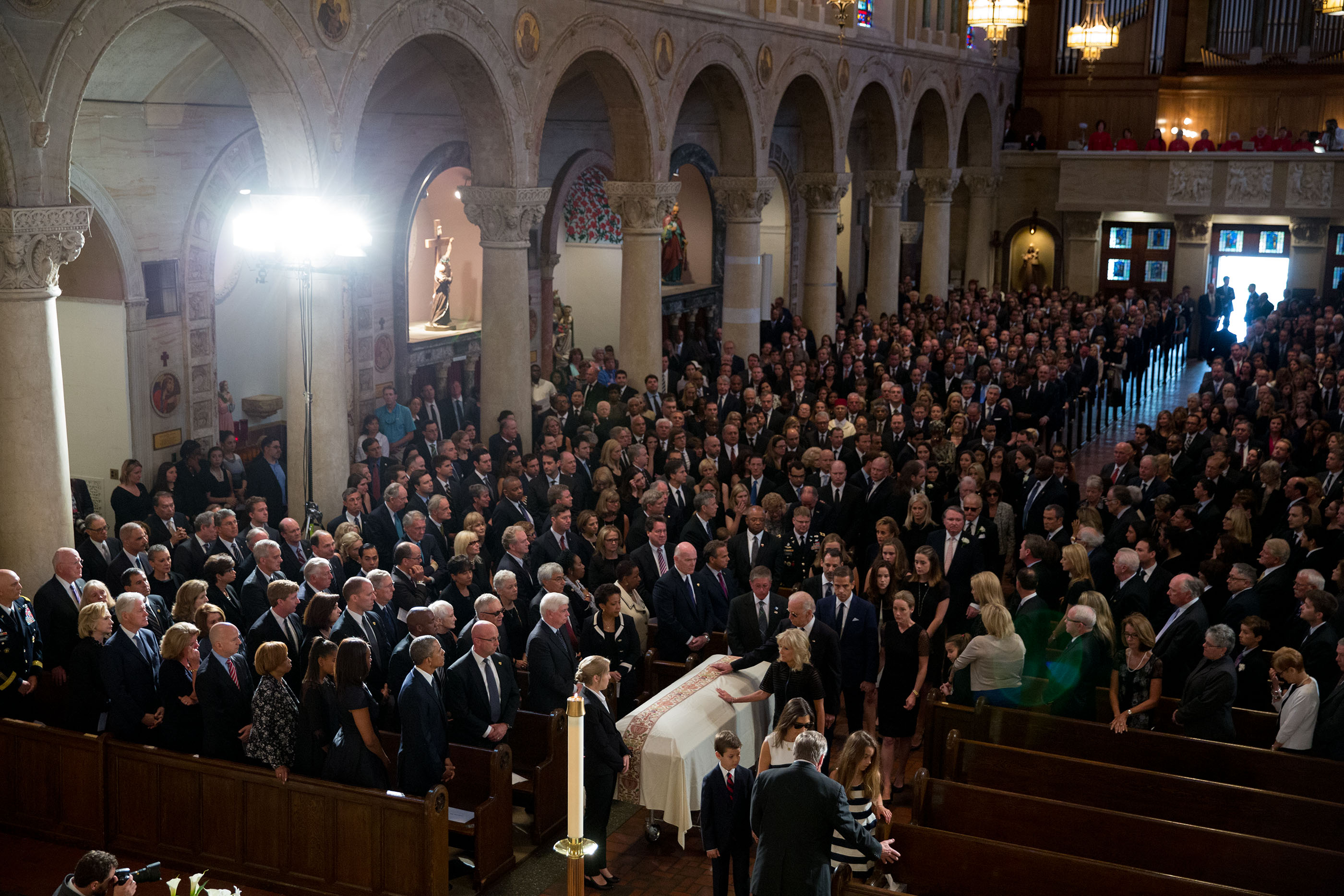
The funeral of Beau Biden in May 2015 at the church

== See also ==
- National Register of Historic Places listings in Wilmington, Delaware
