= Acel Moore =

Prominent Black Journalist in United States

Acel Moore (October 5, 1940 – February 12, 2016) was a long-time reporter, columnist, and editor for The Philadelphia Inquirer. Moore won a Pulitzer Prize in 1977. He was among the first Black journalists hired at The Inquirer.

== Early life ==
Moore and his twin brother were born in Philadelphia, Pennsylvania. He attended Overbrook High School in 1958 and then served for three years as a medic in the United States Army until 1962.

== Journalism career ==
Moore started as a copy boy at The Inquirer in 1962. He was promoted to reporter in 1968.

In 1977, Moore and Wendell Rawls Jr., also of The Inquirer, won a Pulitzer Prize in Local Investigative Specialized Reporting for reporting on the conditions at Farview (Pennsylvania) State Hospital for the mentally ill.

Moore, Chuck Stone of the Philadelphia Daily News, and Claude Lewis of The Evening Bulletin co-founded the Philadelphia Association of Black Journalists in 1973. He was later a co-founder of the National Association of Black Journalists.

In the 1970s, Moore also was a producer on a PBS show called "Black Perspectives on the News." He taught journalism at the University of California-Berkeley, Temple University, and Florida A & M University.

The Nieman Foundation at Harvard University called him "a champion of newsroom diversity." According to Michel Martin of National Public Radio, Moore served "as a mentor to hundreds of journalists, both informally and with programs to introduce people of diverse backgrounds to journalism careers."

In 2005, Moore retired. He received a lifetime achievement award from the National Association of Black Journalists in 2011.

== Personal life ==
He married Linda Wright. They had two children, a daughter (Mariah) and a son (Acel Jr). Acel Sr. died on February 12, 2016, and was interred at Ivy Hill Cemetery in Philadelphia.

== Legacy ==
The Philadelphia Inquirer annually runs the Acel Moore High School Journalism Workshop. According to the Inquirer, the "hands-on program seeks to introduce Philadelphia-area high school students to the fields of print, digital journalism, and photography.

When the School District of Philadelphia renamed the Andrew Jackson School (Philadelphia), one of the four finalists for the new name was the Acel Moore School. It was not chosen as the new name.
