= Philadelphia Boys Choir & Chorale =

America's Ambassadors of Song

Philadelphia Boys Choir & Chorale is a boys' choir and men's chorale based in Philadelphia, Pennsylvania, currently under the direction of Jeffrey R. Smith. They are known as "America's Ambassadors of Song" and America's preeminent boys' choir. They are considered to be one of the best boys' choirs in the world. They have performed in concert venues such as Carnegie Hall, the Sydney Opera House, the Kimmel Center, Notre Dame de Paris, King's College Cathedral, St. Paul's Cathedral and Philadelphia's Academy of Music.

== History ==
After six years at the Frankford High School in North Philadelphia, Robert G. Hamilton took over the All Philadelphia Elementary School Boys Choir (founded in 1961 by Dr. Carlton Jones Lake) in the Fall of 1968. The All Philadelphia Elementary School Boys Choir Ensemble traveled to Montreal, Canada to sing at the 1967 World's Fair (EXPO '67) and traveled to England and Wales as the only integrated choir to sing at the international music festival in Llangollen, Wales in the summer of 1968 (see The Philadelphia Inquirer Today Magazine Section dated June 16, 1968 https://www.newspapers.com/newspage/182095224/). Hamilton took his original High School Choir to the Music Educator's National Convention in Atlantic City in March 1963, and by the summer of 1964 had organized a 30-day tour with 90 singers to Scandinavia as the "Ambassadors of Song." In 1965 the choir sang at the Philadelphia Academy of Music, along with a men's chorus organized by Hamilton. By 1968 he was conducting the All Philadelphia Elementary School Boy's Choir, under the purview of the Board of Education (which consisted of approximately 250 boys from schools all over the city who had been gathering at Benjamin Franklin High School at Broad and Spring Garden Streets since being organized by Dr. Carlton Jones Lake in 1961), but moved to an independent group later that year.

Two years later, he added a Men's Chorale to expand available repertoire. He remained the artistic director for the choir's next 37 years. In 1968 they launched the concert tour to Mexico, the first of many. The Choir has performed premieres of works under the batons of Maestros Eugene Ormandy, Riccardo Muti, Zubin Mehta, Klaus Tennstedt and Wolfgang Sawallisch in concert with the Philadelphia Orchestra.

Riccardo Muti hailed the boys as a "gem" at the performance of the concert version of Puccini's Tosca with internationally acclaimed soloists Carol Vaness, Giuseppe Giacomini, Giorgio Zancanaro and the Westminster Symphonic Choir. During a visit to the Soviet Embassy during the Cold War, the Soviet Embassy said "their voices are a treasure of art" and viewed them highly in bettering understanding between the Soviet Union and the United States.

Guest conductors Dennis Russell Davies and Charles Dutoit have conducted the Choir for performances of Mendelssohn's Midsummer Night's Dream and the concert version of Puccini's La Bohème with the Philadelphia Orchestra. During the 1990s, the Choir added Benjamin Britten's War Requiem to its repertoire under the baton of Wolfgang Sawallisch, as well as the concert version of Carl Orff's Carmina Burana, conducted by Zdenek Macal in 1996 with the Choral Arts Society. They sang in 1992 at the Sydney Opera House to a sold out audience.

Each year, the Pennsylvania Ballet hosts the Choir as part of their seasonal favorite, The Nutcracker. Internationally, the Choir singers have performed for the Royal Families of Sweden, Denmark, England, Thailand and in over 30 countries around the world.

In 2008, the choir celebrated its anniversary with a concert at the Irvine Auditorium and a tour to Spain, a first for the choir. In 2009, the choir went to South America after a successful performance at Carnegie Hall in New York City. Over the years, the choir has become a household name in the Philadelphia area. They have also sung at the White House for four presidents. More recently, the choir sang for then-candidate Barack Obama in Germantown and Laura Bush at the Cityline Hotel in Philadelphia.

== Major annual concerts ==
The Philadelphia Boys Choir and Chorale performs two major annual concerts: the Winter and Spring concerts. The Winter concerts consist mostly of Christmas music, pop songs, and traditional carols. The concerts are often performed in churches, cathedrals, theaters, and the occasional concert hall. The concerts are performed with a select orchestra of musicians from various local ensembles, including the Philadelphia Orchestra and the Philly Pops. It is a family favorite for the entire Delaware Valley and has become a staple of Philadelphia's holiday music scene. Aside from these main concerts that they put on, the Philadelphia Boys Choir and Chorale also regularly performs at many other churches and local events across the region. During the holiday season, the choir often appears on local and national television, including CBS 3 Philadelphia, 6 ABC Philadelphia, the Today Show, and Good Morning America.

The spring concert usually takes place at concert halls, notably the Kimmel Center in Philadelphia, and is often themed, so stage settings, choir fundraisers, and the music selections follow a central motif. The musical styles have ranged from full classical choral or orchestral works (such as Orff's Carmina Burana and Bernstein's Missa Brevis) to pop, musical theater, gospel, jazz, spiritual, and other modern choral compositions. The spring concert offers the most diversity of repertoire, and is often considered the more musically sophisticated of the two.

Concert venues have included the Kimmel Center in Philadelphia, Philadelphia's Academy of Music, Irvine Auditorium, and numerous venues with community and faith-based organizations in the Philadelphia Metro region. Over the years, the choir has been increasing its presence in New York with performances on Good Morning America and multiple concerts at Carnegie Hall and the Lincoln Center.

== Other important performances ==
The choir annually sings the national anthem at the Philadelphia Phillies Home Opener, and has done the same for the 1980 World Series, 1993 World Series, the 2008 NLCS, the 2009 NLCS, and the 2010 NLCS. They also regularly sing at other Philadelphia sporting events, including for the 76ers, Flyers, and Eagles. The Philadelphia Boys Choir sings in the Philadelphia Ballet's annual performance of "The Nutcracker" every winter at the Academy of Music. Starting in 2009, they have performed annually with Peter Nero and the Philly Pops at the Kimmel Center for the Performing Arts. They also often perform at the Philadelphia City Hall annual tree lighting ceremony and the American Heritage Credit Union tree lighting. The Philadelphia Orchestra also often recruits the boys for necessary pieces. The choir also performed at the July 4 game of the 2026 FIFA World Cup at Lincoln Financial Field.

== Recordings ==
The Choir currently offers 1 album in CD Format, Celebrate the Sounds of the Season.

Past albums include:

Two Holiday CDs:

- Shimmering, Glimmering,
- and Holiday Enchantment,

along with one album of audience favorites,

- By Request,

one album of show-tunes.

- One Singular Sensation,

and one Complete Recording of a commissioned work

- Concert Mass.

== Alumni ==
Choir alumni include Joe Bonsall (Oak Ridge Boys), Shawn Stockman (Boyz II Men), Stephen Tirpak, Ukee Washington, Lawrence Zazzo, Pat Grossi (Active Child), Justin Hopkins (opera singer) Mena Mark Hanna (musicologist, founding dean of the Barenboim-Said Akademie, and General Director of Spoleto Festival USA), AUDELCO Award Winner James A. Pierce, III (Actor), Joshua Loper (The Grand and Delaware Military Academy), Ethan Dewey, Leon Bates (concert pianist), and Academy Award Winner Benj Pasek. Boys in the choir have been asked to perform on Broadway on numerous occasions, and several alumni have secured roles.

== Tours ==
Year	Name	Locations Visited
1969	Mexican Tour	Taxco, Mexico City, Guadalupe
1970	Europe Tour	Poland, USSR, Sweden, Denmark, Finland
1972	South Pacific Tour	Australia, New Zealand, California
1974	African Tour	Belgium, Kenya, Mombasa
1975	Japan Tour	Osaka, Kyoto, Kibe, Tokyo, Hawaii
1977	World Tour	Japan, Thailand, Singapore, Denmark, England
1978	United States Tour	Denver, San Francisco, Las Vegas, St. Louis
1979	Second World Tour	People’s Republic of China, Egypt, Pakistan
1980	Canada Tour	Calgary, Knox, Banff
1981	East Coast Tour	Washington DC, Florida
1982	Tricentennial Tour	Queen Elizabeth 2 (transatlantic), London, Southampton
1983	England Tour	Queen Elizabeth 2 (transatlantic), London
1984	Second European Tour	France, Italy, Monaco
1985	Third European Tour	Yugoslavia, Greece
1987	"Let Freedom Sing" Tour	Thirteen Colonies
1988	Ireland Tour	Dublin, Waterford, Wexford
1989	Germany Tour	Bonn, Hennef, Nurnberg, Hamburg, Cologne, Düsseldorf, East Berlin
1990	Middle East Tour	Israel, Jordan
1990	USSR Tour	Leningrad, Moscow, Yaroslavl, Rostov
1992	Australian Tour	Melbourne, Sydney, Brisbane, Cairns
1993	25th Anniversary Tour	England, Scotland, Wales
1994	Central European Tour	Czech Republic, Slovak Republic, Hungary, Poland
1995	Switzerland Tour	Basel, Winterthur, Andelfingen, Unterageri, Tann (France)
1996	Australian Tour	Melbourne, Adelaide, Alice Springs, Ayers Rock, Sydney
1997	South African Tour	Cape Town, Johannesburg, Kimberley, Knysna, Pretoria
1998	'Old South' Tour	New Orleans, Baton Rouge, Natchez, Vicksburg, St. Francisville
1999 - May	Cuban Tour	Havana, Pinar del Rio, Mantanzas, Santiago
1999 - December	2nd Cuban Tour	Havana, Santiago
2000	Germany and Russia Tour	Berlin, Hennef, Wuppertal, Hannover, Nizhny Novgorod
2001	China and Korea Tour	Beijing, Hanchune, Tianjin, Incheon, Seoul
2002	France and Italy	Paris, Aix-en-Provence, Florence, Venice
2003	Florida and Cuba Tour	St. Petersburg, Tampa, Fort Lauderdale, Havana
2004	Scandinavian Tour	Copenhagen, Lund, Oslo, Bergen, Reykjavik
2005	Alaska and Canada Tour	Ketchikan, Juneau, Skagway, Prince Rupert, Seattle
2006	Central America Tour	Florida, Panama, Costa Rica
2007	Greece and Turkey Tour	Istanbul, Thessaloniki, Delphi, Athens
2008	Spain and Germany Tour	Madrid, Seville, Granada, Toledo, Mecklenburg
2009	Argentina and Uruguay Tour	Buenos Aires, Lujan, La Plata, Salto, Colonia, Montevideo
2010	China Tour	Shanghai, Xi'an, Tianjin, Beijing
2011	'Wild West' Tour	Wyoming, Utah, Arizona, Colorado, New Mexico, California
2012	Baltics Tour	Finland, Lithuania, Latvia, Estonia
2013	France Tour	Paris, Loire Valley, Lisieux
2014	England and Wales Tour	London, Cambridge, Leeds, Stratford-upon-Avon, Cardiff, Stonehenge
2015	China Tour	Shanghai, Changzhou, Ningbo, Zhoushan, Lishui, Wenzhou, Changshu, Shenzhen, Huizhou, Dongguan, Ji'an, Yichun, Dalian, Wuhan, Handan, Beijing
2017	Cuba Tour	Havana
2017	Ecuador Tour	Quito, Banos, Otavalo, Pegueche, the Galapagos Islands, Puyo
2018	Vietnam and Singapore Tour	Ho Chi Minh City, Hanoi
2019	Southern Italy Tour	Naples, Rome, Sicily
2020	South Africa/UAE tour (Cancelled)	Johannesburg, Pretoria, Soweto, Drakensberg, Cape Town, Dubai
2022	Puerto Rico Tour	San Juan, Ponce
2023	Gulf Coast Tour	New Orleans, Houston, Montgomery, Birmingham
2024	India Tour	New Delhi, Chennai, Mumbai, Bangalore
2025	Ghana Tour	Accra, Elmina, Tema, London
2026	Bulgaria and Romania Tour	Bucharest, and more
2027	Winter China Tour	Beijing, Nanjing, Shanghai.
