= Beverly Williams =

American television anchor

Beverly Williams (born May 22, 1947) is a former news anchor from Philadelphia.

== Career ==
Williams majored in Social Sciences at Portland State University and began her career at KGW-TV|KGW as a reporter. She then moved to Philadelphia in 1975 and joined KYW-TV as weekend anchor becoming the first black woman to anchor in the Philadelphia market. Williams was promoted to weekday noon anchor in 1979. In May 1981, she began co-anchoring the 6 and 11pm newscasts on weeknights alongside Patrick Emory. She left the station in November 1981. From 1981 to 1986, Beverly was reporter and anchor for CNN in Atlanta, Georgia. Williams took a brief two-year leave from television news but then joined WTNH-TV in New Haven, Connecticut where she was weekend anchor.

In 1989, Williams rejoined KYW-TV as co-anchor of the 6 and 11pm newscasts with Steve Bell and KYW ran a "Beverly's Back" campaign in 1989. She was brought back in hopes of bringing in more ratings to the station which had low ratings compared to rivals WCAU-TV and WPVI-TV. KYW changed the news format in 1991. Williams and Bell were replaced by Jennifer Ward at 11pm in August of that year but still remained in the 6pm time slot. In 1992, Beverly was demoted to weekend anchor while Bell was let go by the station. Williams solo anchored the weekend evening news for eight years expanding from 1992 to 2000.

In February 2000, Williams was dropped as weekend anchor in favor for Denise Saunders and reassigned to senior correspondent for the station. In September 2003, Williams independently produced a half-hour-long weekend public affairs show called Eye on Philadelphia which aired on KYW.

== Lawsuit ==
On May 28, 2002, Williams filed a lawsuit against KYW alleging discrimination based on her race, sex, and age. Williams had previously filed a complaint to the Pennsylvania Human Relations Commission shortly after being terminated as weekend anchor. The suit was settled out of court in May 2003.

== Personal life ==
Williams has one adult daughter. She received the Clarion Award from Women Communications, Inc and was honored for her work with Girl Scouts of the USA and National Association of Black Journalists.
