= Pat Ciarrocchi =

American journalist

- Born: July 2, 1952 (age 73); Philadelphia, Pennsylvania

Pat Ciarrocchi (/ʃəˈrɑːkiː/ shə-RAH-kee; born July 2, 1952) is a retired American broadcast journalist who co-anchored the weekday noon newscast of CBS3 Eyewitness News on KYW-TV in Philadelphia alongside Ukee Washington. A Padua Academy and Rosemont College alumna, she joined the station in 1982 after leaving WHAG in Hagerstown, Maryland, working alongside Bob Borngesser and Glen Presgraves. Previously she had served as anchor of the weekday morning and noon news for almost two decades. While at KYW-TV, she served as co-anchor of Evening Magazine for two years until it was canceled. In 2001, she moved on from the morning news and was promoted to 5 pm co-anchor until it was canceled in favor of Dr. Phil in 2003, as part of the station's "Make the Switch" promotion. Ciarrocchi was the city's longest-tenured female anchor.

The Broadcast Pioneers of Philadelphia inducted her into their Hall of Fame in 2000. In 2015, Ciarrocchi left CBS3 saying she was "not retiring, but rebooting".
