= Trudy Haynes =

American news reporter (1926–2022)

- Born: Gertrude Daniels; November 23, 1926; New York City, U.S.
- Died: June 7, 2022 (aged 95)
- Spouse: Kenyon Pinder
- Presenting career
- Stations: WXYZ-TV, KYW-TV
- Country: United States

Gertrude Haynes (née Daniels; November 23, 1926 – June 7, 2022) was an American news reporter. She became the nation's first African American TV weather reporter when she was hired by WXYZ-TV in Detroit in 1963. In 1965, she became the first African American TV news reporter for KYW-TV (now CBS-3), in Philadelphia, where she continued until her retirement in 1999. Haynes, who received an Emmy Award as well as two Lifetime Achievement Awards during her 33-year tenure at KYW-TV, was hosting an online show called the "Trudy Haynes Show" at the time of her death.

== Early life and education ==
Haynes was born in New York City on November 23, 1926. The only child of Marjorie and Percy Daniels, Haynes attended several schools but she graduated from Forest Hills High School in Queens, Long Island; racial segregation forced her to be bused to school. At Forest Hills she became the only African-American cheerleader on her high school team.

In 1943 she was accepted to Howard University, where she studied sociology and psychology. Haynes earned her bachelor's degree in 1947.

== Career ==
Prior to her work in news and network television, Haynes started with the Ophelia DeVore Charm and Modeling Agency in the early 1950s. DeVore was known for being one of the first to market products to ethnic consumers and use black models during the age of racial segregation and the civil rights movements. Haynes stated in a 2004 interview with Contemporary Black Biography (CBB), "Modeling was just fun, I wouldn't say it was my career....It was just something to do on the side and because I was in New York at the time." While associated with DeVore, Haynes appeared in several advertisements, most notably as the first African American to appear on poster advertisement for Lucky Strike cigarettes. Later she became an instructor for other trainees including Diahann Carroll and Beah Richards.

=== Broadcasting career ===
In 1956, Haynes took her first steps towards her true calling in broadcasting when she was hired by WCHB, a black-owned radio station in Inkster, Michigan. WCHB was the first black-owned radio station north of the Mason–Dixon line. The station was created and operated by the father of one of her college classmates. Haynes was initially hired as a receptionist; however, the director of the station took notice and asked if she wanted to be on a show. Accepting the position, Haynes was named WCHB "Women's Editor" and polished her interviewing skills while hosting a daily 90-minute program targeted to women.

In 1963, seven years after making her broadcast debut, Haynes left the world of radio and entered the homes of many when she became the first African American weather reporter on ABC's WXYZ-TV in Southfield, Michigan, a suburb of Detroit. Two years later, in 1965, Trudy Haynes continued to create milestones as she was hired as the first African American news reporter for KYW-TV (now CBS 3) in Philadelphia, Pennsylvania, where she worked until her retirement in 1999.

When asked about her motivation in landing such a position, Haynes stated that "because of the lack of black reporters in the industry, I was never influenced by anyone. My growth was simply brashness on my part." Haynes tells how she mustered up the courage to attain the position. "I overheard a conversation that a station was looking for a replacement for one of the ladies that was going to leave. She was blonde and blue-eyed. I called John Final, who had vision, and told him I was interested. He told me to come out. Actually, the brash one was him, to have the nerve to even interview a black person. That's the way it went." In regards to the challenges she faced, particularly being a black and female seeking an on-air opportunity, when the industry was primarily dominated by white males, Haynes states,

"Color is so obvious in this country…. Every black feels it. Every black person feels that. And every female that's breaking into (an all-male) situation probably feels the same way."

In the 1970s, Trudy Haynes became the first African American judge for the Miss America Contest, where she continued to break down color barriers firstly as a judge, and secondly, by challenging the narrow standards of beauty that restricted the participation of African American women in the contest. Her challenges opened doors for once barred women of color to become contestants and participate in this competition that had been formerly known as "white only". She continued in the capacity as a judge for the Miss America Contest for three years.

=== Later projects ===
Haynes stayed active in the media world following her retirement from KYW-TV. Based in Philadelphia, Haynes continued to freelance, and make guest star appearances on several local television shows, including WPHL-TV's Philly Connection, PAX-TV's The Good News, and Comcast Cable's Let's Talk About It and Trudy Haynes Discovers Delaware.

Haynes established a production company, First Run Film/Video, where she generated her own show segments. She also became an active member of the Philadelphia Community Access Coalition, now known as Philly Cam, a lobbying group whose mission is to create public-access cable channels in the Philadelphia area.

In 2012 Haynes produced and developed a local television show whose audience included the Philadelphia Tri-State area briefly on Comcast's Bounce, the first national African-owned television network, based in Atlanta, Georgia.

In 2013 Haynes in collaboration with LifeandSpiritOnline.com, a Nazca Network affiliate, moved her popular show from television to an on-line On-Demand format, where "The Trudy Haynes Show" continues to inform its audience on current issues affecting the African American community, like health, education, and political issues. The show also features the local community and community events.

In 2015 Haynes became co-host of Good Day, Good Health! a program created by Edward Grobes of Nazca Network to inform the masses about medical breakthroughs and ways to live a healthier life. Its interactive format, ranging from broadcast television to online on-demand videos, engages viewers to become a part of the program through social media.

== Interviews ==
While on KYW-TV, Haynes' many stories were locally based, she reported on local politics, City Hall and School Board meetings. As time went by Haynes interviewed a wide range of people from Philadelphia mayors and Pennsylvania governors to noted individuals such as Dr. Rev. Martin Luther King Jr., former President Lyndon Johnson, former Vice President of the United States Hubert Humphrey, and former Teamster Union leader Jimmy Hoffa. Later, she began to interview show business personalities. Her connections with the entertainment world led KYW-TV to create a segment titled "Trudy's Grapevine" where she reported celebrity gossip. Additionally, she hosted such local public affairs shows as "Sunny Side Up" and "Sunday magazine".

== Awards, associations and charities ==
Haynes had affiliation with many professional associations, which includes the Philadelphia Branch of the National Association of Black Journalists, lifetime member of the NAACP, National Alliance of Businesspersons, National Negro Business League, National Urban League Guild, and United Negro College Fund, where she established fund raising efforts for five years during her tenure at KYW-TV.

In 1990, she went on to create a scholarship fund to be presented to distinguished Philadelphia-area students, where she established fundraising efforts for five years during her tenure at KYW-TV. In 1995, Haynes was awarded an Emmy in her field. Four years later, she was inducted into the Broadcast Pioneers of Philadelphia Hall of Fame. But her most significant accomplishment, she explained, is that she "managed to cross a line in this field." Haynes states, "I've been very well accepted, I think generally, by all races....Philadelphia is a city of neighborhoods, and in any of these neighborhoods I go into, I'm welcomed. I can't remember but two incidents where I was rejected to my face because of color." Throughout the years Haynes was presented with many awards, appointments, and participated in many organizations and upheld leadership positions:

- 1975: Honorary Citizen Bethlehem, PA Citizen Award
- 1977: City Of Philadelphia Citation Presented By Mayor Frank Rizzo
- 1985: Club Bella Donnas Award For Outstanding Community Service
- 1986: Strength Through Service Appreciation Award For Participation In Navy International Logistics Control Office Black History Month Program
- 1987: Outstanding Alumnus, Howard University Alumni Club Of Greater Philadelphia, Inc.
- 1990: Twenty-fifth Anniversary In Broadcasting Recognition, Presented At The White House By President George Herbert Bush
- 1990: The Trudy Haynes Scholarship Foundation For Broadcasting For The UNCF; Created In Honor Of Trudy's 25 Years, By KYW-3
- 1990: The Patriots Bowl Award, Presented By Mayor W. Wilson Goode
- 1992: Unity Day "Claim Your Culture Award" From Wdas
- 1993: Outstanding Service Award From The Emergency Fund Community Of Older Philadelphians
- 1995: UNCF Lifetime Achievement Award
- 1995: KYW 30th Year Award
- 1995: "Emmy” National Academy Of Television Arts And Sciences
- 1997: Allstate "From Whence We Came" Award
- 1998: AKA Wilma Holmes Tootle 67th NARC Award For Outstanding Contributions To Broadcasting
- 1999: National Coalition Of 100 Black Women For Life Time Achievement As A Broadcast Journalist
- 1999: Howard E. Mitchell Forum Award
- 2000: Celebrate Age Award From The Philadelphia For Aging
- 2008: NAACP 100 Influential Black Women In Philadelphia Award
- 2008: Circle Of Achievement Award, Wesley Proctor Ministries
- 2010: Sigma Gamma Rho sorority, Alpha Eta Sigma chapter Service And Leadership In Broadcasting Award
- 2012: The Elvira B. Pierce Scholarship Fund Legacy Award, For Being A Trailblazer In Broadcast Communications

== Other awards ==
- Edgar A. Howard Community Spirit Award Voter Education
- Liberty Bell Awards From Former Mayors, Frank Rizzo, W. Wilson Goode, John F. Street, Ed Rendell
- Outstanding Service To Delaware Valley Region Award
- The Philadelphia Bowl Award, From Mayor Frank Rizzo
- President Of The United States Of America Appeal Board Member Certificate Of Appreciation, President G. Ford
- The Sherri Award For Outstanding Service And Enduring Contributions
- United Way Award For Outstanding Service
- Variety Club Distinguished Service Award
