= Ukee Washington =

American journalist (born 1958)

- Born: Ulysses Samuel Washington III; August 20, 1958 (age 68)
- Occupation: News anchor
- Years active: 1980–present

Ulysses Samuel "Ukee" Washington III (born August 20, 1958) is an American news co-anchor for the weekday evening newscast on KYW-TV in Philadelphia, Pennsylvania. He currently anchors CBS News Philadelphia on CBS 3 at 5pm alongside Natasha Brown, and solo anchors 6 & 11pm. He was also the sole anchor of an edition that aired at 8pm on sister station WPSG-TV until it aired its final edition on November 6, 2026.

== Family and education ==
Washington is the son of Ulysses S. Washington, a professor and former football coach at Delaware State University. He is the godfather of former Philadelphia Eagles safety Nate Allen. Washington also is the second cousin of actor Denzel Washington.

Washington attended University of Richmond.

== Career ==
Washington originally co-anchored the opening segment of CBS3 @ 4pm along with main anchors Natasha Brown and Alexandria Hoff until May 2020, when Brown and Hoff were inexplicably removed from their anchor positions on the broadcast. The move came as a result of layoffs that occurred due to corporate restructuring in the wake of both the December 2019 merger of Viacom and the station's parent company CBS Corporation to become ViacomCBS (now officially known as Paramount Skydance) and the ongoing COVID-19 pandemic. However, neither Brown nor Hoff were laid off from the station. Jessica Kartalija, who was his co-anchor until she departed the station in September 2024, was added to join Washington in co-anchoring the broadcast until October 2021. In that month, Brown was reinstated as the sole anchor of the 4pm newscast, until she was joined by former WMAQ-TV sports anchor Siafa Lewis on November 15, 2021 and would hold that position until October 8, 2026 when it was announced quietly that Lewis was leaving the station and Brown would once again be the lone 4 p.m. anchor.

While Washington no longer anchors the 4pm newscast, he occasionally fills in for Brown if she is off or on special assignment; Brown or sports director Don Bell fills in for Washington whenever he is off.

Hoff left CBS3 in August 2021 after six years at the station, and is currently a general assignment reporter for Fox News.

Washington formerly anchored Eyewitness News This Morning on CBS 3 and The CW Philly with co-anchor Erika von Tiehl, as well as the hybrid news and entertainment program Talk Philly with Pat Ciarrocchi, which aired weekdays at noon until it was cancelled and reverted to a regular newscast on June 29, 2015, which was anchored by von Tiehl until she left the station in March 2016.

On July 1, 2015, just four days after hosting the final episode of Talk Philly, Washington was named the new co-anchor of Eyewitness News weeknight broadcasts.

=== KYW-TV ===
Prior to joining KYW-TV in 1986 as a weekend sportscaster, he was a sports anchor at WBBH-TV in Fort Myers, Florida, and at WSB-TV in Atlanta. In 1996, he began his co-anchoring duties at KYW on morning newscasts.

In addition to his daily anchor duties, he provides viewers with "Keepin' It Reel," a special segment of the morning newscast during which he previews one of the week's theatrical releases and interviews the releases' stars and directors. Washington also hosted the local teen issues discussion show "Rap Around," which dealt with topics such as race, prom fashions, and having a brother. In 2004, he put together a special report on the still controversial Philadelphia Experiment.

On November 11, 2011, a performance was aired on KYW-TV in which Washington joined the Philadelphia Boys Choir & Chorale, of which he is a former member, and the Facebook Volunteer Choir at the Zion Baptist Church in north Philadelphia, in singing "God Bless America", in tribute to America's military veterans. He had been asked by the Philadelphia Phillies to sing "God Bless America" at a seventh-inning stretch at Citizens Bank Park during the 2011 National League Championship Series, but because the Phillies had been eliminated from the playoffs in the previous round by the St. Louis Cardinals (who went on to win the 2011 World Series), he could not perform for the Phillies. Instead, he chose to film a performance for Veterans Day.

The Broadcast Pioneers of Philadelphia inducted Washington into their Hall of Fame in 2008. In 2013, he was inducted into the Delaware Sports Hall of Fame.

=== Other appearances ===
Washington is the second cousin of actor Denzel Washington, and has had small parts in such movies as Unbreakable (2000), Signs (2002), Shooter (2007), and the 2004 remake of The Manchurian Candidate. He also appeared in The Happening (2008) portraying a television news anchor, his real-life profession. He had a minor, non-speaking part in the film Live Free or Die Hard (2007).

On television, he appeared in an episode of the short-lived CBS drama series Hack and made four appearances as a co-host of the now-defunct CBS daytime show The Talk during a week each season where anchors from CBS stations from around the country were invited to be on the show and co-host with the show's regular panelists. Washington appeared in October 2013, July 2016, April 2019 and May 2020 (the last of which Washington did virtually from his home due to the ongoing COVID-19 pandemic in Philadelphia).
