= Heshimu Jaramogi =

American journalist (1952–2020)

- Born: James Henry Wilson Jr. October 17, 1952; Philadelphia, Pennsylvania, United States
- Died: January 14, 2020 (aged 67); West Philadelphia
- Education: Northeastern Illinois University
- Occupation: Journalist

Heshimu Jaramogi (b.October 17, 1952, d. January 14, 2020) was an American journalist. His outlets included "The Neighborhood Leader," alongside contributions to The Philadelphia Inquirer and Philadelphia radio. He also served as the president of the Philadelphia Association of Black Journalists.

== Biography ==
=== Early life and education ===
Jaramogi was born in Philadelphia to James Henry Wilson Sr., Rosa Braxton Wilson, and (later) a younger sibling (unknown). He graduated from West Catholic High and earned his bachelor's degree from Northeastern Illinois University. Post-graduation, Jaramogi got involved with activism and changed his name from James Henry Wilson Jr. to his current Swahili moniker.

His 1980s he was involved in the development of Jaramogi Communications and involved his work as a WHYY producer, host of Let's Talk About It and stints at WDAS-FM (105.3) and WUSL (Power 99 FM). Heading into the 1990s, Jaramogi wrote for The Philadelphia Tribune, the Philadelphia Daily News, The Philadelphia Inquirer, and the Philadelphia New Observer. Jaramogi Communications campaigned with U.S. Senator Bob Casey, Gov. Tom Corbett, and the District Attorney Lynne Abraham. He worked as an adjunct professor at Temple University. In 2011, he was presented with a Lifetime Achievement Award from the Philadelphia Association of Black Journalists (PABJ).

Jaramogi was raised under catholic beliefs and aspired to be a priest during his childhood. The religious orientation of concern for our neighbor's wellbeing inspired his choice of majors at Northeastern Illinois University, Political Science with an emphasis on Inner City Studies. He was received into membership of the Monthly Meeting of Friends of Philadelphia (commonly known as Arch Street Friends Meeting, which meets at the Arch Street Friends Meeting House) on January 16, 2011.

=== Journalism and radio career ===
Post Northeastern Illinois University, Jaramogi briefly worked as an NPR reporter. In an interview with E. Stevens Collins and Karen Warrington, it is revealed that Jaramogi impressed the staff so much with his report on a woman who was wrongly accused of robbing a Brinks truck that they invited him to apply for a position.

At WDAS (80s), Jaramogi worked as a producer and host for his own radio talk show, Let's Talk About It. From 1986 to 1988, he covered city government and general assignments on WPEN-AM. He was a general reporter for WCAU AM. His colleagues spoke highly of him. Karen Warrington said, "Heshimu was a solid media professional...He was a cultural brother whose African-centric point of view informed him as a communicator."

Jaramogi was part of the Community Development Institute from 1992 to 1993. He worked as an adjunct professor at Temple University, Foothill College, and The University of Pennsylvania. At this time, he ventured into multimedia and created Jaramogi Communications. He was president of Jaramogi Communications for 22 years before moving on to Clear Channel Communications from 2005 to 2007, which brought him back to WDAS AM & FM, WUSL (Power 99 FM) and WJJZ. He had briefly served as media consultant for the AFSCME District Council 47.
