= Padua Academy =

Location
- 905 North Broom Street; Wilmington, New Castle County, Delaware 19806; United States
- Coordinates: 39°45′5″N 75°33′47″W

Information
- Type: Private, all-girls
- Motto: Suaviter Sed Fortiter (Softly but Strongly)
- Religious affiliation: Roman Catholic
- Established: 1954 (72 years ago)
- CEEB code: 080183
- Principal: Mary McClory
- Faculty: 70
- Grades: 9–12
- Enrollment: 667 (2016-17)
- Colors: Black and gold
- Slogan: Spirituality, Scholarship, Service, Sisterhood
- Athletics conference: DIAA Division I
- Mascot: Panda
- Team name: Pandas
- Accreditation: Middle States Association of Colleges and Schools
- Publication: Suaviter Sed Fortiter
- Newspaper: Padua360
- Yearbook: Paduan
- Tuition: $15,700 (2020–2021)
- Affiliation: Diocese of Wilmington
- Website: www.paduaacademy.org

Padua Academy is an all-girls Catholic high school in Wilmington, Delaware, United States. It is part of the Roman Catholic Diocese of Wilmington.

The school strongly emphasizes college preparation, leadership, civic responsibility, and spirituality. Padua is fully accredited by the Middle States Association of Colleges and Secondary Schools and has been recognized as a National Blue Ribbon School of Excellence. It is a four-time winner of the "Superstars in Education" Award from the Delaware State Chamber of Commerce. Padua was named one of the Top 50 Catholic High Schools in America by the Cardinal Newman Society in 2012. Padua is a member of the National Catholic Education Association (NCEA) and the Delaware Association of Independent Schools (DAIS). Padua’s Student Council has earned recognition as a Council of Excellence. Padua Academy is consistently recognized for outstanding community service and has merited both a Regional Gold Medal and a National Bronze Medal from the Jefferson Awards-Deloitte Students in Action program.

== History ==
The school was founded in 1954 by Rev. Joseph L. McCoy, O.S.F.S. and built with the help of members of the St. Anthony of Padua Parish. Its patron saints are St. Francis of Assisi, St. Francis de Sales, and St Anthony of Padua. The first classes of Padua Academy (in the 1950s) took place in the upper level of Saint Anthony of Padua Grade School, located at 9th and North Scott Streets, two blocks away from the present building. Classes also took place in the old P.S. #11 school building in the early years. The present building at 10th and Broom Streets was designed and executed by Rev. Roberto Balducelli, O.S.F.S., who came to the United States from Italy in the 1940s and died in 2013 at the age of 100. The school was built by volunteer labor with the help of Brother Michael Rosenello, O.S.F.S., who died on September 20, 2019.

== Notable alumni ==
- Lisa Blunt Rochester, U.S. Senator from Delaware (2025–present) and former member of the U.S. House of Representatives from Delaware's at-large congressional district (2017-2025)
- Pat Ciarrocchi, newscaster for KYW-TV's CBS3 Eyewitness News
