= Steve Baskerville =

American meteorologist (born 1950)

Herman S. "Steve" Baskerville (born 1950 in Philadelphia, Pennsylvania) is an American television weather presenter.

He joined WBBM-TV in Chicago in September 1987 as weekend weatherman and was the station's primary weekday forecaster from July 1988 to December 2017. Prior to that, he was the weather anchor for The CBS Morning News from 1984 to 1987. Previously, he had worked at KYW-TV in Philadelphia.

A Philadelphia native, Baskerville is an alumnus of Temple University and holds a Certificate in Broadcast Meteorology from Mississippi State University.

On November 28, 2017, Baskerville announced his retirement from television on December 22 of that year. He had spent about 30 years at WBBM-TV.
