= Larry Kane =

American journalist, news anchor and author (born 1942)

- Born: Lawrence Kanowitz; October 21, 1942 (age 83); New York City, U.S.
- Occupations: Television news anchor; journalist; author
- Years active: 1958–present

Larry Kane (born Lawrence Kanowitz; October 21, 1942) is an American journalist, news anchor and author known for his over 6 decade career. Kane spent 36 years as a news anchor in Philadelphia, and is the only person to have anchored at all three Philadelphia owned and operated television stations. Early in his career, he was the only broadcast journalist to travel to every stop on the Beatles' 1964 and 1965 American tours. He has authored three books about the Beatles, as well as a memoir and a novel. After retiring from television journalism in 2002, he is a special contributor for KYW Newsradio.

== Early life ==
Kane was born to a Jewish family in Brooklyn, New York. His parents changed their last name from Kanowitz years before his broadcasting career. Kane's father was an electrical contractor. His mother, Mildred Kane, fought multiple sclerosis for 14 years before her death at age 40. His work with the National Multiple Sclerosis Society began because of his mother's involvement with the disease.

== Career ==
He began his career in broadcast journalism in Miami, Florida at age 16, first at WQAM and later at WAME and WFUN. While working at WAME, Kane became the first U.S. news correspondent to break the story of the Bay of Pigs invasion of Cuba in 1961.

=== Work with the Beatles ===
As the only broadcast journalist to travel to every stop on the Beatles' 1964 and 1965 tours, Kane authored the book Ticket to Ride in 2003. Kane also authored Lennon Revealed, a New York Times and Los Angeles Times Bestseller in 2005. Kane is considered one of the premiere American experts on the life of John Lennon. On July 30, 2013, Kane's internationally distributed book, When They Were Boys: The True Story of the Beatles' Rise to the Top was released.

Kane was also one of the contributors to Yoko Ono's 2005 book Memories of John Lennon, in which he recalled how Lennon cohosted the Philadelphia "Helping Hand Marathon" fundraiser in 1975 and gave a weather forecast on Kane's television newscast.

=== Career in Philadelphia ===
In 1965, he came to Philadelphia as an anchor for WFIL Radio and as main anchor for its sister station WFIL-TV, Philadelphia's ABC affiliate. Kane was the later the primary anchor for the (then new) Action News format. WFIL-TV would change its call letters to WPVI-TV in 1971 after Capital Cities Communications purchased the station from Triangle Publications. Kane is credited with coining the phrase "The Big Story" at the top of Action News, something WPVI uses to this day. Kane would leave WPVI in May 1977, in order to take daily limousine trips to New York City and join WABC-TV.

Kane was an anchor on New York's WABC-TV's Eyewitness News for one year from 1977 to 1978; during that time, he was the lead anchor the night after the infamous New York City blackout of 1977 and also anchored news updates for ABC News.

He returned to Philadelphia in December 1978 and joined WCAU-TV, then a CBS-owned station, as the primary anchor of Channel 10 News at 6 p.m. and 11 p.m. In January 1993 he moved to KYW-TV, an NBC affiliate which became the new CBS station in Philadelphia in 1995. He also hosted a short-time weekly program produced by KYW-TV called The Bulletin with Larry Kane (not to be confused with the defunct Philadelphia Evening Bulletin newspaper). Kane anchored the 6 p.m. and 11 p.m. newscasts at KYW until December 23, 2002.

Kane covered local Philadelphia politics through hosting several public affairs programs. Kane was an anchor at WCAU when sources considered reliable tipped erroneously that Philadelphia mayor William J. Green was subject of federal investigation for improprieties. The story was later retracted, and Green sued CBS.

In 1994, the Broadcast Pioneers of Philadelphia inducted Kane into their Hall of Fame. On November 22, 2002, the Broadcast Pioneers of Philadelphia presented him with their "Person of the Year" award, their highest honor.

Until its 2017 shutdown, he hosted Larry Kane: Voice of Reason, a weekly news analysis program on the Comcast Network. Kane continues to do special reports for KYW, an all-news radio station in Philadelphia.

=== Author ===
A veteran of 23 political conventions since 1964, Kane published in 2000 his first book Larry Kane's Philadelphia, a regional bestseller.

In 2011, Kane released his first novel, Death by Deadline, a cautionary mystery about the dangers of bad information, and the risks of out-of-control local TV news operations.

== Charity work ==
Recognized as a leading proponent of the rights of the disabled, Kane is campaign chairman of the Delaware Valley Multiple Sclerosis Society. For 35 years Kane has broadcast weekly features on radio and TV in connection with the National Adoption Center to find homes for waiting children. He is also involved in many other non-profit endeavors.

== Personal life ==
Kane resides in suburban Philadelphia with his wife Donna. They have two children and six grandchildren.

== Books ==
- Larry Kane's Philadelphia. Philadelphia: Temple University Press. 2000. ISBN 1-56639-806-1.
- Ticket to Ride. New York: Penguin Books. 2003. ISBN 0-7624-1592-4.
- Lennon Revealed. New York: Running Press Book Publishers. 2005. ISBN 0-7624-2364-1.
- Death By Deadline. Dynamic Images Inc. 2011. ISBN 978-1-4635-8537-2.
- When They Were Boys: The True Story of the Beatles' Rise to the Top. Running Press. July 30, 2013. ISBN 978-0762440146.
