= Malcolm Poindexter =

American journalist

Malcolm P. Poindexter Jr. (April 3, 1925 – March 30, 2010) was an American newspaper, radio and television journalist whose career spanned more than 50 years. Poindexter reported for KYW-TV (Channel 3), based in Philadelphia, from 1967 until his retirement in February 2001. He won three Emmy Awards for his reports during his career. He also wrote for the Philadelphia Tribune, The Philadelphia Bulletin, the London Daily Express, Jet and Ebony magazine, and was an early member of the Philadelphia Association of Black Journalists.

== Life and career ==
Poindexter was born and raised in the Eastwick neighborhood of Southwest Philadelphia. His father was a pianist, vocal coach and baritone. He graduated from Overbrook High School and attended Temple University.

He began his career in journalism in 1947 as a writer and general assignment reporter for the Philadelphia Tribune and the Associated Negro Press. Poindexter spent 15 years with the Philadelphia Tribune as a writer, photojournalist, columnist, sportswriter, sports editor, city editor, business manager, assistant comptroller and comptroller. During the 1948 Democratic and Republican National Conventions, both of which were held in Philadelphia, Poindexter had to interview politicians and attendees from the hallways because black journalists were not allowed on the convention floors. Poindexter joined the staff of the Philadelphia Evening Bulletin in 1960 and contributed feature articles to the newspaper's Sunday magazine.

KYW Newsradio, which began broadcasting in 1965, hired Poindexter as one of its first reporters. He created a five-part series on the lives of migrant workers in South Jersey, in which he became a migrant worker himself. His migrant worker series won KYW Newsradio the radio station's first two professional awards – the Sigma Delta Chi Award for Community Service and an Associated Press award.

Poindexter joined KYW-TV in 1967. He worked as a general assignment reporter, education reporter and television host at KYW.

He received more than 300 awards during his career, including four Emmys. Poindexter was inducted into the Philadelphia Broadcast Pioneers Hall of Fame in 1996.

Poindexter and his family moved from his former home on Washington Square, an affluent section of Center City, to a larger house facing Norris Square in North Philadelphia in 1975. He rehabilitated their new home and turned his attention to the surrounding neighborhood, which suffered from high crime and poverty. He later spoke to a Philadelphia Daily News reporter of his move, "I'd been reporting on misery and suffering for 25 years. I felt there was more I could do than just report after the fact. Why not roll up my sleeves and see what I could do?" People Magazine ran an article on Poindexter called "A Philadelphia Anchorman Fights to Change His Mean Streets" on his efforts in its June 30, 1980 issue.

Poindexter retired from KYW-TV, often known as CBS 3, in February 2001, and was named "Ambassador to the Arts" for the CBS television station.

Malcolm Poindexter died of complications from Alzheimer's disease at the Hospital of the University of Pennsylvania on March 30, 2010, at the age of 84, just four days before his 85th birthday. A resident of Center City at the time, Poindexter was survived by his wife, Ilse, a former librarian with the Free Library of Philadelphia; sons, David and Malcolm III; daughter, Lynne and a stepdaughter, Kirsten. He was also survived by three former wives – Lois Herring, Edie Garrett, and Lottie Brevard Poindexter.
