= KYW-TV =

Television station in Philadelphia

- Philadelphia, Pennsylvania; United States
- Channels: Digital: 30 (UHF); Virtual: 3
- Branding: CBS Philadelphia; CBS News Philadelphia

Programming
- Affiliations: 3.1: CBS; for others, see § Subchannels

Ownership
- Owner: CBS Television Stations; (CBS Broadcasting Inc.)
- Sister stations: WPSG

History
- Founded: 1932
- First air date: September 1, 1941
- Former call signs: WPTZ (1941–1956); WRCV-TV (1956–1965)
- Former channel numbers: Analog: 3 (VHF, 1941–2009); Digital: 26 (UHF, 1998–2019)
- Former affiliations: NBC (1941–1995)
- Call sign meaning: Derived from KYW

Technical information
- Licensing authority: FCC
- Facility ID: 25453
- ERP: 1,000 kW
- HAAT: 370.8 m (1,217 ft)
- Transmitter coordinates: 40°2′33″N 75°14′32″W

Links
- Public license information: Public file; LMS
- Website: www.cbsnews.com/philadelphia/

KYW-TV (channel 3), branded as CBS Philadelphia, is a television station in Philadelphia, Pennsylvania, United States. It is owned and operated by the CBS television network through its CBS Television Stations division alongside WPSG (channel 57), an independent station. The two outlets share studios on Hamilton Street north of Center City, Philadelphia; KYW-TV's transmitter is located in the city's Roxborough section.

KYW-TV, along with sister station KDKA-TV in Pittsburgh, are the only CBS-affiliated television stations east of the Mississippi River with "K" call signs.

== History ==
=== As W3XE (1932–1941) ===
The channel 3 facility in Philadelphia is Pennsylvania's oldest television station. It began in 1932 as W3XE, an experimental station owned by Philadelphia's Philco Corporation, at the time and for some decades to come one of the world's largest manufacturers of radio and television sets. Philco engineers created much of the station's equipment, including cameras. When the station began operations as W3XE, it was based within Philco's production plant, at C and East Tioga streets in North Philadelphia, complete with a small studio and transmitter. In 1941, it began sharing programs with W2XBS (later WNBT and now WNBC) in New York City, becoming NBC's second television affiliate, and creating a link between the station and the network that would last for 54 years.

=== As WPTZ (1941–1955) ===
On July 1, 1941, W3XE received a commercial license—the third in the United States, the first outside of New York City, and the first not owned and operated by a network—as WPTZ. The station signed on for the first time on September 1, becoming the first licensed television station in Pennsylvania. Philco then moved WPTZ's studios to the penthouse suite of the Architect's Building, at 17th and Sansom streets in downtown Philadelphia, while retaining master control facilities at the Philco plant. The station originally broadcast from a tower in the Philadelphia suburb of Wyndmoor. It significantly cut back operations after the U.S. entered World War II, but returned to a full schedule in 1945. Channel 3 relocated its entire operation to the Wyndmoor transmitter facility during World War II, when the station aired little programming. It then became one of three stations (along with WNBT and Schenectady, New York's WRGB, now a fellow CBS affiliate) that premiered NBC's regular television service in 1946, although all three stations did share occasional programs just before and during the war. When full broadcasting was resumed, the station reactivated its studio in the Architect's Building, remaining there until 1947. WPTZ then moved into unused space at 1619 Walnut Street in Center City, where KYW radio was housed. What is now KYW-TV has been based in Center City ever since.

The Westinghouse Electric Corporation, owner of Philadelphia's longtime NBC Radio affiliate KYW, purchased WPTZ in 1953 for a then-record price of $8.5 million. The WPTZ call letters are now used for the NBC affiliate in Plattsburgh, New York.

=== As an NBC-owned station and change from WPTZ to WRCV-TV (1955–1965) ===
In May 1955, Westinghouse agreed to trade WPTZ and KYW radio to NBC in exchange for WNBK television and WTAM AM-FM in Cleveland, and $3 million in cash compensation. NBC had long sought an owned-and-operated television station in Philadelphia, the largest market where it did not own a station. It had made several offers over the years for the Philadelphia stations, but Westinghouse declined each time. After being rebuffed by Westinghouse on several occasions, NBC threatened to drop its affiliation from WPTZ and Westinghouse's other NBC television affiliate, WBZ-TV in Boston, unless Westinghouse agreed to the trade. NBC took over operation of WPTZ and KYW in late January 1956; on February 13, 1956, channel 3's call letters were changed to WRCV-TV (in reference to the RCA-Victor record label; KYW radio adopted the WRCV calls as well).

Shortly after NBC took control of channel 3, the Federal Communications Commission (FCC) collapsed the Lehigh Valley, most of northern Delaware and southern New Jersey (including Atlantic City) into the Philadelphia market. NBC realized WRCV-TV's existing tower was inadequate for this enlarged market. In 1957, channel 3 moved to a new 1,100-foot (335 m) tower in Roxborough. The tower was co-owned with WFIL-TV (channel 6, now ABC owned-and-operated station WPVI-TV) and added much of Delaware, the Lehigh Valley, and southern New Jersey to the station's city-grade coverage. The new transmitter enabled channel 3 to broadcast in color for the first time.

However, almost immediately after the trade was finalized, Westinghouse complained to the FCC and the United States Department of Justice about NBC's alleged coercion and a lengthy investigation was launched. On September 22, 1959, the Justice Department issued a decision which, in part, forced NBC to divest WRCV-AM-TV by the end of 1962. Several months later in early 1960, NBC announced it would trade the WRCV stations to RKO General in exchange for its Boston outlets, WNAC-AM-FM-TV. RKO would also acquire NBC's WRC-AM-FM-TV in Washington, D.C. in a separate but related sale, and NBC would replace Washington in its TV station portfolio with then-independent station KTVU in the San Francisco Bay Area, to be purchased separately by the network. As regulators sifted through that multi-level transaction, Philco Corporation, the original operators of WPTZ and by this point owned by the Ford Motor Company, interjected itself into the dispute by first protesting the FCC's 1957 renewal of NBC's licenses for the WRCV stations. Then, in May 1960, Philco filed an application with the FCC to build a new station on channel 3. By October 1961, the purchase of KTVU, and the contingent sale of the WRC stations, had collapsed following objections from NBC's existing San Francisco affiliate, KRON-TV; the WRCV-WNAC trade itself was not affected, however the transactions involving NBC and RKO, along with other related applications by both companies, had been set for hearings by the FCC the preceding May.

In August 1964, the FCC renewed NBC's licenses for WRCV-AM-TV again—but this time, only on the condition that the 1956 station swap with Westinghouse be reversed. Both RKO General and Ford (through Philco) contested the FCC's decision initially, but soon each firm gave up their efforts and bowed out of the competition. Following nearly a year of appeals by NBC, Westinghouse regained control of WRCV-AM-TV on June 19, 1965. Westinghouse had moved the KYW call letters to Cleveland after the swap, and channel 3 became KYW-TV upon the company regaining control of the Philadelphia outlets.

=== As a Westinghouse station (1965–1995) ===
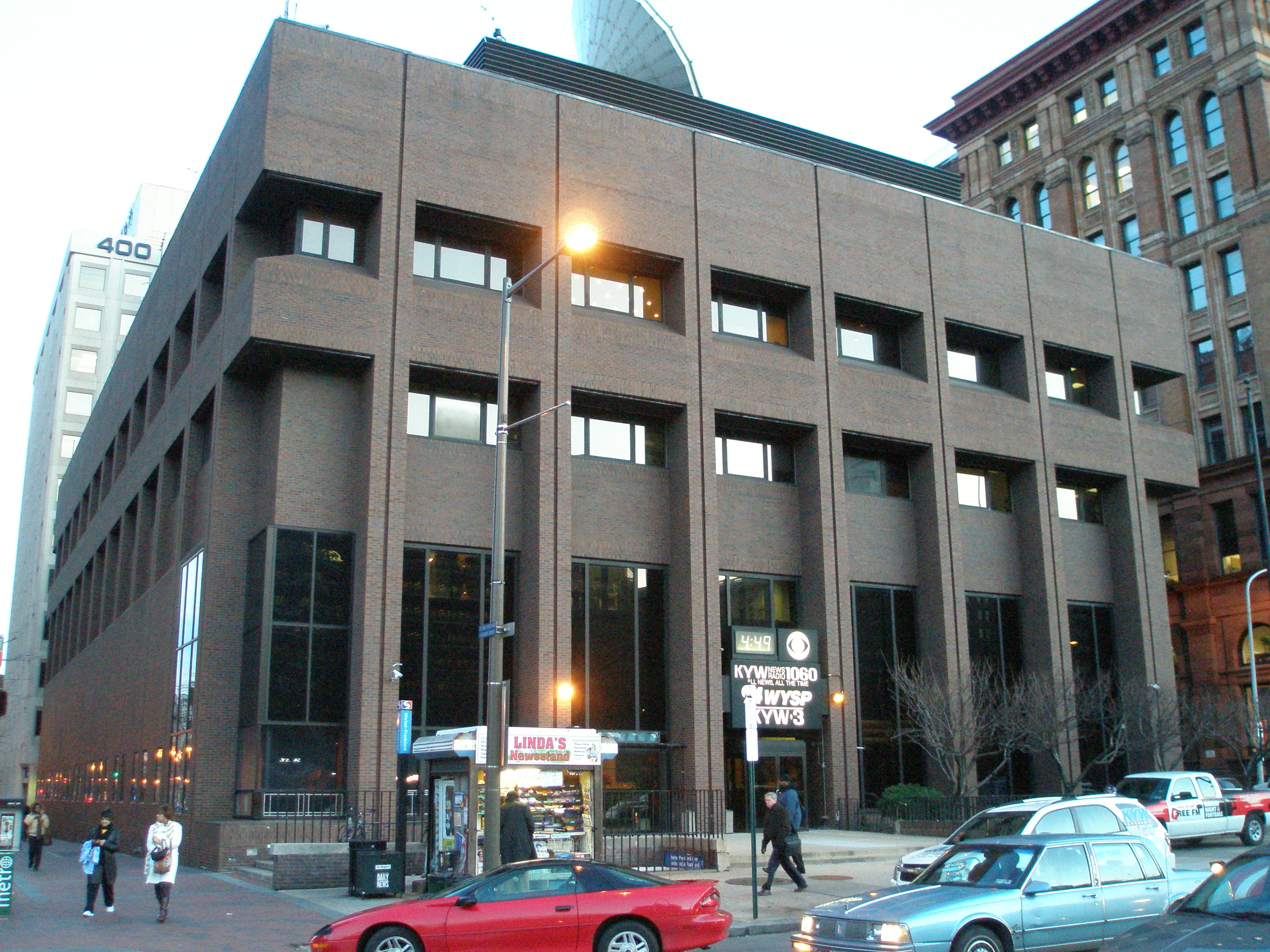
The former KYW Building on Independence Mall East, used by the station from 1972 to 2007. This building has since been demolished and replaced by the National Museum of American Jewish History.

On June 16, 1994, Baltimore sister station WJZ-TV lost its affiliation with ABC after that network announced a deal with the E. W. Scripps Company to switch three of Scripps' television stations to ABC; one of the Scripps-owned stations joining ABC was Baltimore's NBC affiliate, WMAR-TV. This deal, which was spurred by an affiliation agreement between Fox and New World Communications, did not sit well with Westinghouse, who felt betrayed by ABC after nearly half a century of loyalty. As a safeguard, Group W intensified a search (which had begun prior to WJZ's affiliation loss) for affiliation deals of its own. Group W eventually struck an agreement to switch KYW-TV, WBZ-TV, and WJZ-TV to CBS (Westinghouse already had two CBS affiliates in its portfolio at the time, KDKA-TV in Pittsburgh and KPIX-TV in San Francisco). CBS was initially skeptical about including KYW-TV in the deal. While KYW-TV was a poor third, CBS-owned WCAU-TV (channel 10) was a solid runner-up to long-dominant ABC-owned WPVI-TV. However, after Westinghouse offered to sell CBS a minority stake in KYW-TV, CBS agreed to move its affiliation to channel 3 and put channel 10 up for sale. NBC emerged as the winner for channel 10, having fought a bidding war against New World Communications and Fox.

=== As a CBS-owned station (1995–present) ===
NBC wanted to reclaim ownership of KYW-TV, but the affiliation agreement between CBS and Westinghouse took it away from them and forced NBC to own WCAU. Bob Wright, president and CEO of NBC, had the network's ownership of Philadelphia—and specifically KYW—part of the network owning stations in the largest markets as part of the strategic plan to keep NBC as the highest-rated network during the early to mid-1990s.

While WJZ-TV and WBZ-TV switched to CBS in January 1995, the swap was delayed in Philadelphia when CBS discovered that an outright sale of channel 10 would have forced it to pay massive taxes on the proceeds from the deal. To solve this problem, CBS, NBC and Group W entered into a complex ownership/affiliation deal in late 1994. NBC traded KCNC-TV in Denver and KUTV in Salt Lake City (which NBC had acquired earlier that year) to CBS in return for WCAU, which for legal reasons would be an even trade. CBS then traded controlling interest in KCNC and KUTV to Group W in return for a minority stake in KYW-TV. As compensation for the loss of stations, NBC and CBS traded broadcasting facilities in Miami. The deal officially took effect at 1 a.m. on September 10, 1995. The final NBC program aired on KYW-TV was a rerun of Saturday Night Live, which began at 11:30 p.m. on September 9, 1995, the day that channel 3 ended its 54-year affiliation with the network and became a CBS affiliate; NBC moved all of its programming locally to WCAU after the program ended. Westinghouse bought CBS outright in late 1995, making KYW-TV a CBS owned-and-operated station. This made Philadelphia the largest television market to be affected by the affiliation switches.

In 2000, the combined company was purchased by Viacom. The deal brought KYW-TV under common ownership with Philadelphia's UPN station, WPSG, which relocated to the KYW Building on Independence Mall. When Viacom became CBS Corporation in 2006 (after spinning off its basic cable networks and the Paramount film studio into a new Viacom), CBS retained all related terrestrial broadcasting interests, including KYW-AM-TV and WPSG.

On April 2, 2007, KYW-TV and WPSG moved to a new broadcast complex located at 1555 Hamilton Street near Center City Philadelphia, across from the Community College of Philadelphia and near Fairmount Park. The new building, which is wired for high definition newscasts, is the fourth studio in the station's 75-year history. Channel 3 had been broadcasting from Independence Mall East since July 1972.

KYW-TV was effectively separated from its radio counterpart in November 2017, when CBS Radio merged into Entercom (now Audacy).

On December 4, 2019, CBS Corporation and Viacom remerged into ViacomCBS (now Paramount Global).

== Logos ==
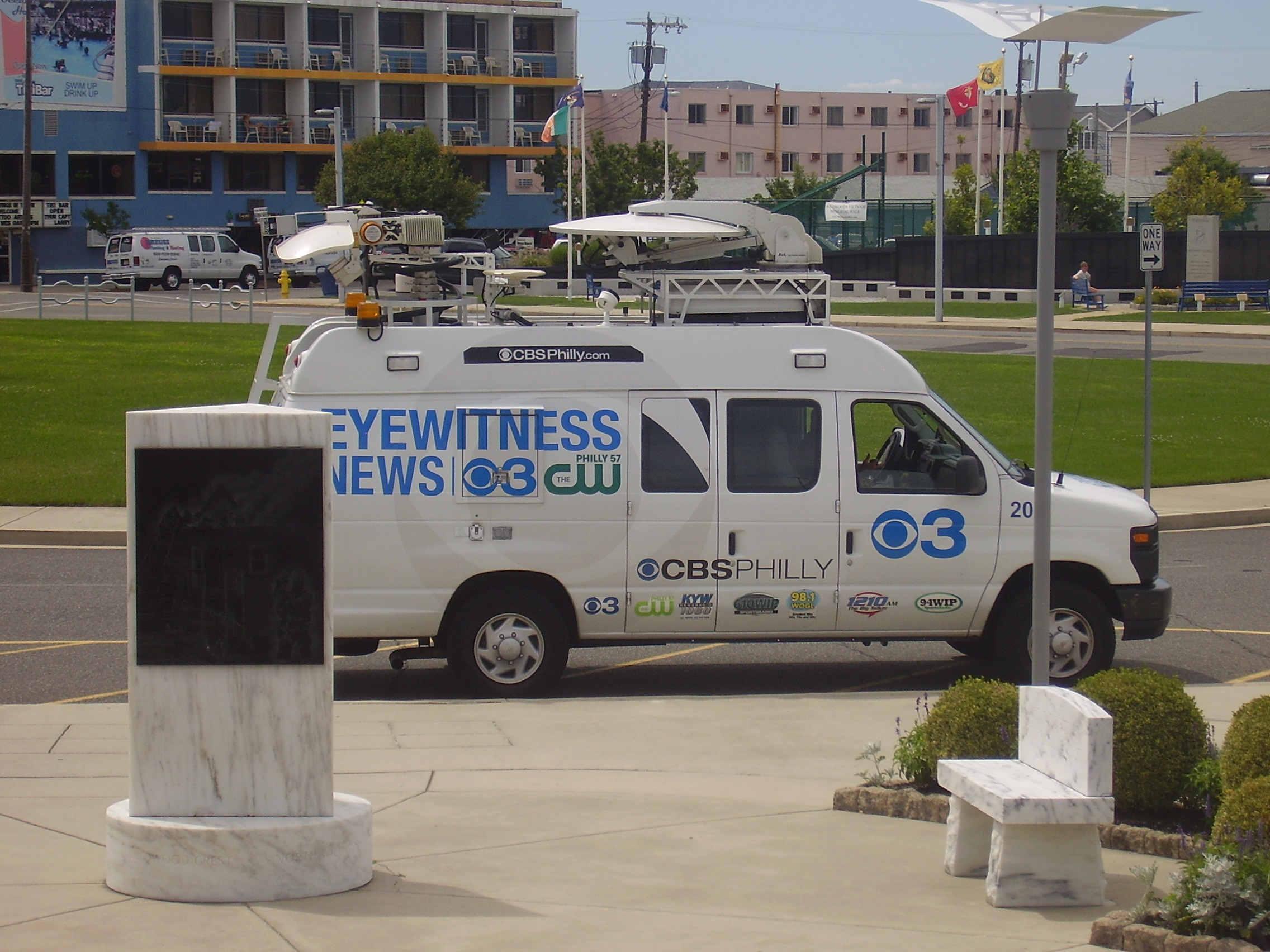
CBS Philadelphia van in the Wildwoods of New Jersey

From 1965 to 2003, KYW-TV's logo was a distinct "Stylized 3" in the font made famous by Group W. (Group W had introduced the font, and the logo, in 1963 upon the introduction of Westinghouse Broadcasting's corporate imaging while the station was still in Cleveland.) It was the longest continuously-used logo in Philadelphia television history until 2006, when WPVI-TV's simple "6" logo passed it. The only major change came in February 1998, when the CBS Eye was placed in front of the "3". The logo was finally retired after KYW-TV rebranded as CBS 3.

== Programming ==
=== Past program preemptions and deferrals ===
Despite its status as NBC's largest affiliate, KYW-TV spent much of the thirty years that followed the 1965 trade reversal preempting many NBC programs, choosing to air local or syndicated programming instead. The production arm of Westinghouse Broadcasting was partially responsible for the preemptions, as channel 3 (along with its sister stations in the Group W chain) aired shows produced and syndicated by Group W, such as The Mike Douglas Show (whose production moved from Cleveland to the Walnut Street studio in Philadelphia in 1965, and then taped at Independence Mall East until 1978), The David Frost Show and the Westinghouse franchise Evening Magazine (which was broadcast on non-Westinghouse owned stations airing their own versions of the latter show as PM Magazine). The network programs affected by the preemptions were usually lower-rated daytime game shows, soap operas, or reruns of prime time programs with an average of two hours per day. At one point, in the fall of 1980, KYW-TV preempted NBC's entire morning schedule after the Today show. Over the years, NBC contracted independent stations WPHL-TV, WTAF-TV/WTXF-TV, WKBS-TV, and WGTW-TV to air programs preempted by channel 3; most of the preempted programs aired on WMGM-TV, which served as the NBC affiliate for Atlantic City until 2014. However, at the time NBC was far less tolerant of preemptions than the other networks and was rather perturbed at losing valuable advertising in the nation's fourth-largest market.

Like most affiliates that preempt underperforming network programs, KYW-TV used the preemptions to gain an increase in local advertising rates which potentially come with ratings increases. This proved to be a very profitable decision at first, as KYW-TV was either first or second in the Philadelphia television ratings for most of the 1960s and 1970s. However, the station (and NBC) faltered in the late 1970s, and by 1980, KYW-TV was the lowest-rated network affiliate in Philadelphia. It stayed in the ratings basement even when NBC rebounded to become the nation's most-watched network by 1985. For the rest of its tenure as an NBC affiliate, KYW-TV was the network's lowest-rated major-market affiliate during a very prosperous period for NBC as a whole. It continued to heavily preempt NBC programming, much to the network's chagrin. Notably, in 1986 the station chose to preempt NFL coverage so as not to compete against WCAU airing a Philadelphia Eagles game, choosing instead to air the film The Bingo Long Traveling All-Stars & Motor Kings.

Under the terms of Westinghouse's deal with CBS, KYW-TV began carrying the entire CBS schedule in pattern with no preemptions except for extended breaking news or severe weather coverage. If a situation arises to where CBS programming is preempted by local news coverage, the programs can be shifted to sister station WPSG.

=== Sports programming ===
Channel 3 has had a long history of carrying Philadelphia-area sports teams through NBC and CBS. From 1948 to 1989, through NBC's broadcast contract with Major League Baseball, select Philadelphia Phillies contests were aired on channel 3, which included their victory in the 1980 World Series. After NBC assumed the broadcast contract to what had become the American Football Conference of the NFL in 1970, the station also aired all Philadelphia Eagles games in which they played host to an AFC team, doing so until 1995; they resumed broadcasting Eagles games (again, usually when the team plays against the AFC team at home) after the station joined CBS when the network acquired the AFC package from NBC in the 1998 season. From 1990 to 1995, Philadelphia 76ers games also aired on Channel 3 by way of NBC's broadcast contract with the NBA.

=== News operation ===
KYW-TV presently broadcasts 44 1/2 hours of locally produced newscasts each week (with 7 hours, 5 minutes each weekday; 4 hours, 5 minutes on Saturdays; and five hours on Sundays). KYW-TV cooperates with sister station WCBS-TV in the production and broadcast of statewide New Jersey political debates. When the two stations broadcast a statewide office debate, such as Governor or U.S. Senate, they will pool resources and have anchors or reporters from both stations participate in the debate. Additionally, the two stations cooperate in the gathering of news in New Jersey where their markets overlap; sharing reporters, live trucks, and helicopters. Like other CBS-owned stations, KYW-TV offers a web-only newscast called CBS 3 At Your Desk, shown daily.

Shortly after Westinghouse regained control of KYW-TV in 1965, news director Al Primo popularized the Eyewitness News format and branding. This format has the reporters actually presenting their stories instead of having an anchor read them. Primo used the cue "007" from the film From Russia with Love as the theme. Within a few years, Group W's other television stations had adopted the format. Around this same time, sister station KYW radio became one of the first all-news radio stations in the country. Channel 3's newscasts, anchored by Vince Leonard starting in 1958 (during its stint as NBC-owned WRCV-TV), had long been second behind WCAU-TV, but the new format catapulted KYW-TV to first place. Also seen on the air during that time were future talk show host Tom Snyder and Marciarose Shestack. Primo took the concept with him to New York City's WABC-TV in 1968, albeit an improved version that introduced the concept of chatter among the anchors ("happy talk"). It was this modified format that was emulated throughout the United States.

Channel 3 dominated the ratings for the rest of the 1960s, but faced a new challenger after WFIL-TV introduced Action News to Philadelphia. For most of the 1970s, KYW-TV traded first place with WFIL/WPVI. In 1972, KYW-TV hired Philadelphia-area native Jessica Savitch as a reporter, and later co-anchor alongside Leonard. Mort Crim also joined as an anchor during that period, forming what native Philadelphians called the "Camelot of television news". Leonard, Crim and Savitch were joined at the anchor desk in 1976 by native Philadelphian Jack Jones, who at WCAU-TV had become the city's first African-American news anchor. However, in 1977, WPVI beat KYW-TV in most timeslots by a wide margin during a sweeps period. In a case of especially bad timing, Crim left for WBBM-TV in Chicago in May, and Savitch left for NBC News three months later. Channel 3's ratings went into rapid decline. The station tried to stop the decline by adopting a new format called "Direct Connection", with reporters assigned to "beats" such as medical, consumer, entertainment and gossip, among others. While this concept was at least a decade ahead of its time, it was not enough to stop the ratings slide. By the time Jones departed for WLS-TV in Chicago in 1979 and Leonard left for KPNX in Phoenix in 1980, Eyewitness News had crashed into last place.

Having seen its quartet of top-rated anchors move on, KYW-TV attempted a reformat of its newscasts, hiring new talent from outside the Philadelphia market to take center stage. Despite the presence of personalities such as Maria Shriver, Maury Povich, Ron Hunter, Stan Bohrman, and Patrick Emory, Eyewitness News stayed in the ratings basement. For most of the next 20 years, KYW-TV was a very distant third behind WPVI-TV and WCAU-TV. In the late 1980s, the station also produced news updates for USA Network, titled the USA Update; these were anchored by Steve Bell, who came to channel 3 in 1986 from ABC News, and other KYW staffers. In 1993, production was moved over to Hubbard Broadcasting's All News Channel, where they were produced until 2000.

In 1991, KYW-TV rebranded itself as "KYW 3" after being known on-air as simply "channel 3" for most of its history (except for the "Direct Connection" era, when it was known as "3 For All"). It also abandoned the longstanding Eyewitness News branding after 26 years and experimented with giving each newscast a different title: the morning news became known as Newsday, the weekday 5:30 and 6 p.m. news as Newsbeat, and the nightly 11 p.m. and weekend 6 p.m. newscasts as The News (the former as The News Tonight; the latter broadcasts, respectively, as The News Saturday and The News Sunday). It also started using a theme based on the five-note musical sounder of its radio sister, one of the top all-news stations in the country and the highest-rated radio station in Philadelphia for most of the last 40 years; indeed, their news director during this era was previously at KYW radio. Group W hoped to gain the trust of viewers who already associated KYW radio with high-quality news. However, neither of these fixes worked—mainly because of putting unknown anchors Bruce Hamilton (who had previously anchored in Orlando at WESH and WCPX, and after his stint here, returned to Florida at Jacksonville's WJXX and WJXT) and Jennifer Ward (previously of Toronto's CFTO) at the helm of the evening newscasts, while the more familiar personalities were relegated to weekends and mornings. As a result, channel 3 stayed in the ratings basement. For most of what would be its last half-decade with NBC, channel 3 only aired two hours of news per day, an unusually low local news output for a Big Three network station in a Top 10 market and among the lowest of Group W's stations. Channel 3 discontinued its noon newscast to accommodate lower-rated NBC Daytime programs at the start of 1991. Additionally, long after 5 p.m. newscasts became standard in major markets, channel 3 scaled back its early-evening news block to a half-hour at 6 p.m. to carry first-run syndicated programs during the entirety of the 5 p.m. hour in September 1992.

The experiment with different newscast names ended after almost three years in 1994, just before it became a CBS station, when the station began calling its newscasts KYW News 3, with familiar Philadelphia anchors Larry Kane (from rival WCAU-TV) and Stephanie Stahl (from Miami's WSVN) coming on board. Kane anchored the 11 p.m. broadcast solo, while Stahl anchored the 6 p.m. report, first with Bruce Hamilton, then with Pittsburgh's Don Cannon (though due to potential confusion with a local radio DJ also named Don Cannon, he went under his birth name of Don Clark while at KYW; he left in 1998 for sister KDKA). Also during this time, the station entered into an agreement with the Franklin Institute to use weather data collected by the Institute for use in on-air forecasts, branded as the Franklin Institute Forecast. A half-hour noon newscast was resurrected following the September 1995 switch to CBS. The Eyewitness News name was restored in early 1998.

KYW-TV used music packages based on KYW radio's musical signature until 2003, even in the period immediately after rebranding as "CBS 3". That year, it adopted "News in Focus" by composer John Hegner as its theme song. This package, like the majority of themes for CBS' owned-and-operated stations, is based on "Channel 2 News", written in 1975 for WBBM-TV in Chicago (known as "I Love Chicago, Chicago, My Home"; ironically, WCAU-TV used music based on this theme for its last decade as a CBS-owned station). Channel 3 used an updated version written in 2003 for New York City sister station WCBS-TV. The change to "News In Focus" came just after KYW began branding itself "CBS 3". In 2005, KYW-TV ditched "News In Focus" in favor of another "Channel 2 News"-based tune, "The Enforcer" (a.k.a. "The CBS Enforcer Music Collection") also composed by Frank Gari.

Also in 2003, KYW-TV became a factor in the Philadelphia news race for the first time in over 20 years. The previous summer, it persuaded WPVI-TV's longtime 5 p.m. anchor, Marc Howard, to jump ship to anchor its 11 p.m. newscast. Kathy Orr, weekend weathercaster at WCAU, also moved to channel 3. Then, in September, the station lured Larry Mendte away from WCAU. Mendte had been the lead anchor at that station when it defeated WPVI in the ratings for the first time in 30 years. Alycia Lane, a weekend anchor at Miami's WTVJ, was added to complement Mendte, and they became the station's new top anchor team, anchoring KYW's 6 and 11 p.m. newscasts.

The 5 p.m. news was moved to 4 pm, and Howard moved off the 11 p.m. newscast to anchor with Denise Saunders. The change proved successful, as KYW moved ahead of WCAU at 11 p.m. and came within a point of knocking off WPVI in the time slot. Saunders left the station in 2004 and was replaced by Angela Russell. Russell left the station on December 26, 2008. The 4 p.m. newscast returned to the 5 p.m. timeslot due to The Oprah Winfrey Show ending and WPVI starting its own hour-long 4 p.m. newscast in 2011. The 4 p.m. timeslot on KYW was given to Dr. Phil. For the last decade, KYW-TV has waged a spirited battle with WCAU for second place behind WPVI. It is currently second in most timeslots, while WPVI continues to dominate with its newscasts despite having its digital signal on interference-prone channel 6. On August 6, 2018, the station relaunched a new 4 p.m. newscast called CBS3@4 anchored by Natasha Brown and Alexandria Hoff with lead anchor Ukee Washington appearing in the opening segment, moving Dr. Phil to 3 p.m. which was occupied by reruns of Family Feud (which airs on sister station WPSG) until August 3, 2018. In an interesting twist, Family Feud repeats returned to the 3 p.m. slot on September 11, 2023, and would air in that time slot until July 29, 2024, when they would be replaced by The Drew Barrymore Show, while Dr. Phil repeats (as the show had ended its run in May) departed KYW and would move to WPHL at 4 pm. In May 2020, Brown and Hoff were removed from the 4 p.m. anchor positions and Washington took over as anchor alongside Jessica Kartalija until October 2021 when Brown returned as sole anchor. One month later in November, former WMAQ sports anchor Siafa Lewis was named Brown's new co-anchor.

In April 2007, KYW-TV became the third Philadelphia television station to begin broadcasting its newscasts in high definition; the switch coincided with the station's move from its former Independence Mall studios to its new facility on Hamilton Street. On February 2, 2009, KYW began to produce a nightly prime time newscast at 10 p.m. for sister station and then-CW affiliate WPSG, Eyewitness News at 10 on The CW Philly. This would continue until July 18, 2022, when the broadcast was modified as CBS News Philadelphia NOW on The CW Philly to recognize the launch of a hybrid local/national news broadcast on several CBS-owned CW and MyNetworkTV affiliates and independent stations, in addition to the debut of a brand-new modernized set for all Eyewitness News editions earlier in the day. The new broadcast's format was a hybrid consisting of live local news and weather reports from the Eyewitness News team and national news stories anchored on weekdays by Tom Hanson and on weekends by Traxson Griggs from a virtual set.

On October 19, 2009, KYW dropped its noon newscast in favor of launching a local talk show called TalkPhilly, which left WPVI as the only station in the market to run a noon newscast (WCAU airs its midday newscast at 11 a.m. while WTXF does not air a newscast at noon). On June 26, 2015, TalkPhilly aired its final broadcast due to declining ratings and was reverted to a traditional noon newscast the following Monday.

In September 2018, Jessica Dean announced that she would be leaving the station after five years to pursue another assignment. She has since joined CNN as a correspondent for the network's Washington bureau. On October 29, 2018, Dean's position as Ukee Washington's co-anchor was filled by Jessica Kartalija who came from KYW's sister station, WJZ-TV in Baltimore. On September 8, 2024, Kartalija would reveal on her Facebook page that she was no longer with KYW and CBS as a whole after an 18-year career at both WJZ and KYW, though at the time the reason for her being let go was unknown.

Morning meteorologist Katie Fehlinger left the station on September 17, 2019, after more than eight years to spend more time with her family and pursue other professional ventures. Her position was covered in the interim by fellow meteorologists Matt Peterson, Lauren Casey and Kate Bilo, former weekend morning meteorologist and current WBAL meteorologist and traffic reporter Chelsea Ingram, and those from outside the station that were auditioning for the job including former WCAU Chief Meteorologist Tammie Souza and former KNSD weekend meteorologist Llarisa Abreu. On February 10, 2020, Abreu was officially announced as taking Fehlinger's position at KYW; however, she unofficially started at the station a day earlier due to Peterson taking a day off as he had been working earlier that week. In September 2021, Peterson would depart the station after four years to explore another career path. In February 2022, his spot on weekends would be filled permanently by Souza while Peterson became a fill-in for any vacationing meteorologist. In May 2022, weekend evening meteorologist Lauren Casey would also depart the station to work with Climate Central to focus on the science behind global climate change. On September 26, 2022, Andrew Kozak would officially join the station to do the 4 p.m. newscast & take over Casey's position on weekend evening editions. Bilo announced via social media in December 2022 that she would step down as Chief Meteorologist and scale back her schedule to be able to spend more time with her family. Bill Kelly, former chief meteorologist at WJLA-TV in Washington, would be hired by KYW to become the new chief meteorologist in January 2023 and Abreu left the station a month later after three years to become a meteorologist at NBC station WTVJ in Miami. Bilo then appeared in Abreu's former morning and noon position until March 20, 2023, when she officially announced via social media that she would be permanently in that spot and filling in at other times only if asked to. Exactly a week later, Grant Gilmore announced in a tweet that he would be leaving Tampa Bay CBS affiliate WTSP and joining KYW as their newest meteorologist.

KYW-TV launched a streaming news service, CBSN Philly (a localized version of the national CBSN service) on January 30, 2020, as part of a rollout of similar services across the CBS-owned stations. In January 2022, the streaming channel name was changed to CBS News Philly and later to CBS News Philadelphia in conjunction with a similar rebranding of the national service.

On July 18, 2022, the weather forecasting was officially branded as NeXt Weather in accordance with a branding plan for O&O weather forecasts to either be branded as NeXt Weather or First Alert Weather. KYW went with NeXt Weather due to competitor WCAU branding their forecasts First Alert Weather for several years.

On September 12, 2022, the station launched an additional hour-long newscast in the 9 a.m. time slot, Eyewitness News @ 9AM (currently CBS News Philadelphia @ 9AM). The program was anchored by Natasha Brown and from its initial launch until July 26, 2024, it aired in a unique format: the first half hour aired from 9 to 9:30 a.m. on KYW, the station's website and the CBS News Philadelphia streaming service while the entire hour aired on the website and streaming service exclusively. The 9:30–10 a.m. slot on CBS3 was occupied by The Drew Barrymore Show, whose broadcast format was modified, starting with the show's third season onward, to allow stations to air the show as two half-hour episodes which could be broadcast separately or back-to-back. KYW followed the separation format in airing the show while sister station WPSG carries both episodes in back-to-back format Tuesday through Saturday mornings at 3 am. On July 29, 2024, a scheduling change was announced as The Drew Barrymore Show was moved to 3 pm, replacing Family Feud and airing in the back-to-back format with the full hour-long newscast airing in its entirety on CBS3. The 3 a.m. airings on WPSG are not affected by the change. On September 9, 2024, Janelle Burrell became the new lead anchor of the 9 a.m. newscast as Brown moved to anchoring the 5 p.m. newscast alongside Ukee Washington in the wake of Jessica Kartalija's departure.

CBS News Philadelphia became the full-time branding of KYW-TV's news operation on April 12, 2023, coinciding with a shift from the longtime Eyewitness News format to a more community-based focus, featuring more in-depth reporting. The rebranding was part of a larger-scale rebranding of CBS-owned stations; KYW-TV uses a green version of the CBS stations' graphics package, in part as a nod to the Philadelphia Eagles, but also serving to distinguish the station from other television news entities that primarily use blue.

On August 31, 2023, CBS News Philadelphia NOW on The CW Philly aired its final broadcast on WPSG due to the station and several other CBS-owned CW affiliates dropping the network and becoming independent stations the next day, September 1. The station continued to air an hour-long newscast, however it was now fully produced by KYW and aired weeknights at 8 p.m. until it was unexpectedly canceled on November 6, 2026, replaced by repeat airings of Family Feud.

On December 19, 2025, just one month after announcing it on air, longtime morning and noon anchor and former consumer reporter Jim Donovan retired after 39 years in broadcasting, 22 of which were with KYW-TV. Before he retired, he was officially awarded the Guinness World Record for having the largest collection of socks with a total of 1,531 pairs, most of which were sent to him by the station's viewers.

==== Notable current on-air staff ====
- Natasha Brown – anchor/reporter
- Ukee Washington – anchor

==== Notable former on-air staff ====
- Diane Allen
- Susan Barnett
- Steve Baskerville
- Steve Bell
- Richard Bey
- Charles Bierbauer
- Colette Cassidy
- Pat Ciarrocchi
- Garry Cobb
- Mort Crim
- Irv Cross
- Paul Deanno
- Mike Douglas
- Howard Eskin
- Tamsen Fadal
- Dave Frankel
- Dick Goddard
- Max Gomez
- Mark Haines
- Trudy Haynes
- Marc Howard
- Calvin Hughes
- Walt Hunter
- Jack Jones
- Larry Kane
- Ernie Kovacs
- Bill Kuster
- Maria LaRosa
- Alycia Lane
- Judy Lee
- Siani Lee
- Oren Liebermann
- Robin Mackintosh
- Larry Mendte
- Al Meltzer – sportscaster
- Andrea Mitchell
- Kathy Orr
- Jerry Penacoli
- Malcolm Poindexter
- Maury Povich
- Al Primo − creator of the Eyewitness News format
- Beasley Reece – sports anchor (1998–2015)
- Jessica Savitch
- John Schubeck
- Wayne Shannon
- Maria Shriver
- Tom Snyder
- Dick Standish
- Dawn Stensland
- Mary Stoker Smith
- Jennifer Ward
- Bill "Wee Willie" Webber – hosted game show Tug-O-War: Sponsored by Penn Fruit in 1963
- Beverly Williams
- Joe Witte

== Controversies ==
=== 2008 Lane and Mendte firings ===
In January 2008, 6 and 11 p.m. news anchor Alycia Lane was fired weeks after she was arrested in New York City the month prior for hitting a female police officer and calling her a "dyke". The firing came as a result of the arrest being the second incident that Lane was involved in within a year. A previous incident in May 2007 saw Lane be penalized after it was learned that she had sent a photo of herself in a bikini via the station's email to her friend, NFL Network anchor Rich Eisen. The email only came to light due to the revelation that the account it was sent to was one Eisen shares with his wife Suzy Shuster.

In June 2008, 6 and 11 p.m. news anchor Larry Mendte, who was Alycia Lane's co-anchor until her firing five months earlier, was himself fired from the station after police conducted a raid of his home and seized his computers due to an investigation by both law enforcement authorities and CBS 3. The investigation revealed that he had hacked Lane's email account at the station and had not only been secretly reading thousands of Lane's emails from her account during and after her employment at the station on multiple occasions, but also passing them on to gossip columnists. In a public statement, Mendte said that his actions were rooted in a feud that started after he ended a "flirtatious and improper" relationship with Lane.

Additionally, it was learned that Mendte was also hacking into the email of another coworker at the station, current WRC-TV chief meteorologist Doug Kammerer. The FBI ultimately decided that while the evidence regarding the Kammerer hack was credible, it was not strong enough to warrant additional charges against Mendte. Mendte did, however, plead guilty to the charges regarding Lane.

In September 2008, Lane filed a lawsuit against Mendte and KYW-TV, claiming that the station had been negligent in preventing Mendte from divulging her personal information and photos to columnists. The lawsuit was ultimately settled in October 2016, though no specific details of the settlement were revealed to the public.

=== 2013 Brewer and Erickson viral exchanges ===
CBS 3 also made headlines in June 2013 when video surfaced on YouTube of weekend morning anchor Nicole Brewer and meteorologist Carol Erickson appearing to exchange on-air jibes at each other during their weekend morning newscasts. Station management said the edited video was taken out of context and the personalities have a mutual respect for one another. Brewer left CBS 3 in June 2018 to spend more time with her family.

=== 2015 firings ===
On June 30, 2015, station management fired longtime lead anchor Chris May, chief meteorologist Kathy Orr, and sports director Beasley Reece without any advance warning in a move that shocked many viewers. In a situation similar to the infamous 1996 "Massacre" that had occurred at its sister O&O flagship station WCBS-TV in New York, May and Reece learned of their firings nearly three hours before they were scheduled to go on the air at 5 p.m. while Orr (who had been the chief meteorologist since 2003) was on vacation at the time she was notified of her firing. Jessica Dean, who had joined CBS 3 just two years earlier and anchored alongside May, Orr and Reece, was the only member of their broadcast team to avoid being fired. Additionally, meteorologist Carol Erickson resigned after a 37-year career at the station to focus more on her animal rights advocacy. The next day, on July 1, it was announced that Ukee Washington would be moved from mornings to weeknights to co-anchor with Dean (marking the second time that Washington would be shifted to anchoring weeknights as he had previously anchored the 5 p.m. newscast with Dawn Stensland), while Kate Bilo would take over Orr's slots and become the station's Chief Meteorologist, with morning meteorologist Katie Fehlinger also reporting for the noon newscast, replacing Bilo. In September of the same year Don Bell would return to CBS3 to take over Reese's former position as sports director and weeknight sports anchor, leaving Fox Sports 1 after previously having been a weekend sports anchor at CBS3 from 2005 to 2010.

=== 2020 layoffs ===
On May 27, 2020, KYW-TV laid off more than twelve Eyewitness News employees and on-air personnel in response to several factors affecting the station's parent company ViacomCBS (now known as Paramount Skydance), including a corporate restructuring due to the merger of Viacom and CBS Corporation in December 2019 and the decline of advertising revenue in the wake of the global COVID-19 pandemic. Among those laid off were general assignment reporter Crystal Cranmore, South Jersey Bureau reporter Cleve Bryan, and general assignment reporter/fill-in anchor Chantee Lans. Several off-camera personnel such as floor directors, engineers, and editors were also laid off. The two most notable employee layoffs were weekend evening sports anchor Lesley Van Arsdall and weekday morning traffic anchor Chandler Lutz. Lutz returned to the station on December 10, 2021, and it was announced that she would be returning to the morning newscast the following Monday.

=== 2021 investigation of racism, homophobia and sexism ===
In January 2021, two high ranking executives within CBS 3's parent company Paramount Skydance Corporation (which at the time was known as ViacomCBS) were placed on administrative leave after an investigation was opened due to an article in the Los Angeles Times revealing that CBS Television Stations president Peter Dunn and senior vice president David Friend (who was also the news director at WCBS-TV) were accused of creating a hostile work environment for other news managers and anchors/reporters at other CBS O&O stations by making several racist, sexist and homophobic remarks and purposefully using unfair tactics to prevent Black journalists from being hired or promoted. The revelation was uncovered as part of an independent investigation into the allegations that were leveled against former CBS Entertainment president Leslie Moonves from 2018.

CBS 3 itself was mentioned as having been affected by the actions of Dunn and Friend on several occasions. One high-profile instance involved the promotion of Ukee Washington from morning news anchor to lead evening anchor in 2015 after Chris May was fired. According to former station manager Brien Kennedy, although Dunn had approved of Washington's promotion to lead anchor (as Dunn had been there as station manager from 2002 to 2004) there were several instances when Dunn would speak harshly about the longtime station personality through e-mails saying, "All he does is dance...dancing, dancing" and in a 2016 budget meeting incident (which was related by Kennedy and former news director Margaret Cronan) Dunn said of Washington: "He's not doing that 'jive talking' anymore? Sometimes he's just not speaking my language".

This, however, was not the only instance of Dunn and Friend's behavior affecting the work environment at the station. When current KTTV Good Day LA anchor Brooke Thomas was hired by KYW to become anchor of the morning newscast in April 2016 to replace Erika von Tiehl who had left the station a month earlier, many had thought that she was a great addition to co-anchor alongside Jim Donovan. According to Cronan, however, neither of the two executives liked Thomas. The day after her debut, Friend had called Cronan and verbally berated her, directing her to tell Thomas to "shut the (expletive) up", stop smiling so much and to not fake a Southern accent even though Thomas is originally from Oklahoma. Additionally, it was revealed that Dunn had sent several messages to Kennedy with just a one-word message regarding Thomas: "Unwatchable". Just a few weeks later, Dunn sent Friend to conduct a meeting with Cronan and within minutes of the meeting starting Dunn told her that the station needed to fire Thomas and stop producing any promotional material featuring Thomas. Additionally, during another meeting Dunn turned to Cronan and in front of several other staff members asked her "Are you a (expletive) idiot?" In October 2016, just six months into her tenure at the station, Thomas was told in a meeting with Kennedy and Cronan that her contract with the station would not be renewed and she left at the end of the month.

Her replacement Rahel Solomon also found herself in Dunn and Friend's crosshairs when they stated in messages and meetings with Kennedy that she too needed to be let go for bizarre reasons, including that they "didn't like her face". Solomon would depart the station in 2019 to join CNBC and is now currently a reporter with CNN. Several more Black reporters would leave the station at this time including Justin Finch who is now a reporter for ABC, and Steve Patterson who would leave and become a reporter for NBC. Furthermore, a candidate that was being considered to be hired at the station was according to Dunn "too gay for Philadelphia", a reason that sounds bizarre considering that Donovan himself is openly gay.

It would be the station's coverage of Bill Cosby's rape trial in April 2018 that would prove to be the most damning case of Dunn and Friend's inherent bias. When the jury in the trial had announced that it had reached a verdict in the case, the station had to get their anchors in place in studio to go live with the report. Ukee Washington was already in position to go on air but his usual co-anchor at the time, Jessica Dean, was not available. In Dean's place, the station tasked 4 p.m. anchor Natasha Brown to take the anchor desk with Washington. Shortly thereafter, Kennedy received a call from Dunn who told Kennedy, "You do have a diversity problem," which was a reference to the fact that both Washington and Brown are African-Americans. Kennedy stated to Dunn that he was not in agreement with the sentiment expressed by Dunn.

In 2019, Kennedy was fired by Dunn and Friend for what they claimed to be poor performance in his job at the station despite the fact that there was information that showed that Kennedy would not only meet specific objectives with his job but in some instances exceed them. They told him to make up a story to others at the station as to explain why he was being let go but he vehemently refused to do so. Shortly thereafter, he filed a claim with the Pennsylvania Human Relations Commission in which he stated that he was fired in retaliation for his agreeing to cooperate with the internal investigation of Dunn and Friend.

Ultimately, in April 2021, both Friend and Dunn were fired from their positions at the network (and for Friend he was also fired as news director at WCBS) due to the revelations of their egregious behaviors not just at KYW, but across the entire CBS network.

== Technical information ==
=== Subchannels ===
The station's signal is multiplexed:

Subchannels of KYW-TV
| Subchannel | Res. | Short name | Programming |
|---|---|---|---|
| 3.1 | 1080i | KYW-TV | CBS |
| 3.2 | 480i | StartTV | Start TV |
| 3.3 | 480i | DABL | Dabl |
| 3.4 | 480i | ROAR | Roar |
| 57.1 | 720p | WPSG | WPSG (Independent) |

Broadcast on behalf of another station

Digital subchannel 3.2, branded as CBS Philly Plus, was launched in November 2011 as a 24-hour news channel drawing upon the resources of KYW-TV, KYW radio (1060 AM), WPHT (1210 AM), and WIP (610 AM and 94.1 FM). The Plus service was eventually planned to be rolled out to CBS' other owned-and-operated stations, but only KYW-TV and WCBS-TV in New York City added Plus channel services.

On October 21, 2014, CBS and Weigel Broadcasting announced the launch of a new digital subchannel service called Decades, scheduled to launch on all CBS-owned stations in 2015, including on KYW-TV on channel 3.2. On January 16, 2015, Decades started after eight minutes of a test pattern that occurred first with the CBS Philly Plus ticker and then one minute later with a test pattern without the CBS Philly Plus ticker. On September 3, 2018, Decades was replaced by Start TV.

=== Analog-to-digital conversion ===
KYW-TV ended regular programming on its analog signal, over VHF channel 3, on June 12, 2009, the official date on which full-power television stations in the United States transitioned from analog to digital broadcasts under federal mandate. The station's digital signal continued to broadcast on its pre-transition UHF channel 26, using virtual channel 3. The analog-to-digital conversion commenced when the station cut to a reproduction of an original W3XE test pattern, with a voiceover announcing the switch to digital. As the test pattern was displayed in silence, it briefly cut to a still from a commercial for Zappos, an online clothing retailer, before cutting back to the pattern. After the pattern was displayed on screen for a lengthy amount of time, the image cut to the CBS logo, with the text "Goodbye" below, before transmission ceased.

KYW-TV was the only Philadelphia market station participating in the "Analog Nightlight" program. A few minutes after the station signed off on June 12, 2009, the station signed its transmitter back on, airing nightlight programming from the National Association of Broadcasters, which looped until July 12, 2009.

=== Spectrum reallocation ===
KYW-TV and WPSG both shifted their frequencies on August 1, 2019, as part of the FCC's 5G network spectrum reallocation, with KYW-TV shifting from channel 26 to channel 30, and experiencing technical issues with over-the-air reception due to the repack. As with many stations, KYW-TV also had to launch the new frequency on a lower power. The station expects to return to full power following the installation of new 1-megawatt transmission antennas in November 2020.

== See also ==
- List of three-letter broadcast call signs in the United States
