= Broadcast Pioneers of Philadelphia =

American non-profit organization

The Broadcast Pioneers of Philadelphia is a state-chartered, federally recognized, 501(c)(3) non-profit organization, devoted to collecting information about and promoting cultural work related to broadcasting and communications in Philadelphia, Pennsylvania, US, and its metropolitan area. The group was founded in 1962 as a local chapter of the national Broadcast Pioneers organization, but became an independent organization in 1995.

The organization is made up of over 500 members of the broadcast community. Full members must have 10 years or more experience in the business while associate members need less.

Broadcast Pioneers of Philadelphia is more often simply referred to as just Broadcast Pioneers. They run college student career nights on local college campuses and annual symposiums, also for college students. The symposia rotate between three television stations in the Philadelphia market that originate local newscasts. In a three-year time period, local college students can visit all three. They also award college scholarships. In April 2014, they awarded 20 scholarships to local students.

Broadcast Pioneers also maintains several local broadcasting archives ranging from video to audio to photographs and other historical documents. Their website was awarded "Honorable Mention for Best Info Site" by Time magazine.

In addition to collecting information and archives, they professionally record interviews with local broadcast legends. These productions are available on YouTube for public access.
