= Louis Dorren =

American sound engineer, music producer and inventor

- Born: 1948
- Died: October 26, 2014 (aged 65–66)
- Occupations: Audio engineer, record label executive and producer
- Known for: Quadraphonic broadcasting

Louis Dorren (1948 – October 26, 2014), commonly referred to as Lou Dorren, was an American sound engineer, music producer and inventor. He was also the owner of Bay Sound Records.

In 1969 Dorren invented the Quadraplex system of single station, discrete, compatible four-channel FM broadcasting. He founded Quadracast Systems, Inc. (QSI) of Palo Alto, California, United States to license his patents to RCA and others.

Dorren was awarded more than a dozen patents in the radio communications field, many of which are still in use today.

== History and background ==
Dorren's recording experience was starting to develop when at the age of 15 he was recording a local group. Years later, in the 2000s he would produce and work on recordings for The Beau Brummels and actor / singer Ronny Cox.

In the 1970s Dorren was the director of research for Quadracast Systems, located in San Mateo, California. While in that position he made a prediction of sorts that with Discrete CD-4 records that only a single inventory would be required. He was the inventor of the QSI system that sparked up interest in quadraphonic broadcasting.

Dorren was well known to the organizers of the Westcoast Songwriter's Conference, with him and his company sponsoring and supporting the event for years. At the 26th annual conference, he hosted a segment in the Xytar room on how to make home recordings sound professional. At the same event he brought actor / singer Ronny Cox to appear at the Xytar Room.

=== News of death ===
Dorren died on October 26, 2014, from complications of heart and kidney problems. He was 66 years old. His remains were interred at the Salem Memorial Park cemetery in Colma, California.

== Companies ==
=== Bay Sound Records ===
Bay Sound Records was a label that Dorren started in the 1960s. In later years, well in to the 2000s the label would release a recording by The Beau Brummels. Other recordings released in later years were by Canvas with Storyteller, Ragtimers Nan Bostick and Tom Brier with Missing You at the McCoys Bay Sound Records BSR6945, and their other album Dualing at the McCoys.

=== Xytar Digital Systems ===
In the 2000s he was the CEO of Xytar Digital systems, a company located on Taylor Boulevard in Millbrae, California. Xytar handled remastering of soundtracks, and had done work for Ballet San Jose. Albums such as Dualing at the McCoys by Nan Bostick & Tom Brier were recorded with its technology. As well as being a sponsor of the Westcoast Songwriter's Conference for years, Xytar was the main or sole sponsor of the WCS International Song Contest in 2004. It was also one of the sponsors for the International Songwriting Competition (ISC) the following year.

Two examples of Xytar recording equipment were the Xytar ADMS 32HD "studio-in-a-box" system and the DMS4848 CDR system that provided simultaneous recording on 48 tracks.

== Music production ==
=== Early years ===
Around 1964 when he was 15 years old, Dorren was friendly with some guys at his high school who had a band called The Banshees. He produced two singles for them. The first single was "They Prefer Blondes" bw "Take a Ride with Me". The second was "Never Said I Loved You" / "So Hard to Bear. Both singles were released on the SOLO label. Later with Kensington Forest which was a Banshees incarnation of sorts, he produced another single called "Movin’ On" bw "Bells". This was released on the Bay Sound label in 1967.

=== later years ===
In 1995, Slyest Freshest Funkiest Rarist Cuts by Sly & The Family Stone was released on the Magical Mystery label. Produced by Leo De Gar Kulka and co-produced by Michael Briggs, it featured four songs plus outtakes recorded by Kulka in August 1967. Dorren handled the transferring of the material. In 2006, Dorren co-produced actor / singer Ronny Cox's live album Ronny Cox At the Sebastiani Theatre. In addition to the production chores, he mixed the album. Later, he worked on another Ronny Cox album, How I Love Them Old Songs..., as Engineer and handling the Mastering and Mixing. Decades later after The Beau Brummels had broken up, remaining members of the band got together with Dorren and recorded a new album that was released on his Bay Sound label in 2013. The album was called Continuum. Sadly Dorren's wishes for all the original members to record weren't possible as the drummer John Petersen died in 2008. They had found three drum tracks of Peterson that had been recorded in 1965. One of them was used and Ron Elliott wrote the words to it and it was made into a song called "She Is.". Further recordings were made and the CD that was released contained 18 tracks. The album was recorded over a period of a year and a half. It was recorded with his own designed equipment at his studio in Alameda, California.

== Quadraphonic ==
=== Broadcasting ===
Hi system helped radio station KIOI FM make broadcasting history when the station did the first discrete quadraphonic broadcast. In 1974, Dorren who was still a college student at the time assisted radio station owner Jim Gabbert in the broadcast. Along with Gabbert's homemade equipment and Gabbert's station manager Mike Lincoln, they conducted the experimental broadcast. As a result of the tests, an application for discrete quad broadcasting was made to the (FCC) Federal Communications Commission. Assistance was sought from the Electronics Industries Association by the FCC to help just as was done with stereo broadcasting. A National Quadraphonic Committee was formed. On the 22nd of September that year, further on air tests were conducted at KIOI-FM. Along with radio engineers there were people from companies such as General Electric, Zenith, Nippon Columbia and RCA, and Quadracast Systems. As of October, 1974, the company was headed by Dorren. Between the 23rd and 27th of that month, guideline tests were conducted. Following that, the quad tests were launched.

=== CD-4 1970s ===
In 1973, Dorren was working with Jac Holzman, president of Elektra Records, in relation to the CD-4 system and its relationship to the records. In an interview Holzman said that Lou had built him a demodulator, and Holzman who had previewed others said that Lou's was the best he'd heard.

In the mid 1970s, CD-4 demodulator kit was offered by Southwest Technical Products. It was designed by Dorren. Also offered was an optional Technics" EPC-451C cartridge and a test record he had recorded for Southwest Technical Products. Readers of the Popular Electronics magazine in which the items were advertised could send away for them. Products Corp. In 1974, Dorren was at a party with his fiancé Nancy Bostic. Other guests included Claude Hall from Billboard Magazine, Casey Casem, and Tom Rounds. Dorren had a chance to demo his IC chip CD-4 Discrete Quadracast Systems demodulator. At that time there were only two of them in existence. And only a few people had heard them in action.

=== CD-4 2000s ===
In 2007, 33 years after his first CD-4 demodulator, Dorren designed a new one with the technology of the day in mind.

== Discography list as producer ==
Singles
Act	Title	Label and catalogue	Year	Notes
The Banshees	"They Prefer Blondes" / "Take a Ride With Me"	Solo 1	1965	
The Banshees	"Never Said I Loved You" / "So Hard to Bear"	Solo 2	1965	
Kensington Forest	"Bells" / "Movin' On"	Bay Sound 6901	1967	
The Styx	"Hey, I'm Lost" / "Puppetmaster	Onyx 2200	1967	
The Tears	"Rat Race" / "People Through My Glasses"	Onyx 2201	1968	
Weird Harold	"Saratoga James" / "Just Yesterday"	Onyx 2202	1968	
Gypsum Heaps	"Would You Love" / "Moving On"	Onyx 2203	1968	
Sweet Thunder	"Bean Whistle Rag" / "I Never Wanted To Be A Woman"	Soundbird SB1-XB	1975	CD-4 record
Louis Dorren & James Gabbert	Quadraphonic, 4 Channel / 2 Channel Test Record	Soundbird SB4X-002	1975	CD-4 record

Albums
Act	Title	Label and catalogue	Year	Notes
Canvas	Storyteller	Bay Sound Records BSR7311	2003	
Various Artists	Love Is The Song We Sing (San Francisco Nuggets 1965-1970	Rhino Records R2 165564	2007	Original producer on Track: "Hey I'm Lost" by Butch Engle & The Styx
Ronny Cox	At The Sebastiani	Wind River Records RCO4040D	2008	
The Beau Brummels	Continuum	Bay Sound Records BSR9165	2013	

== Discography list as technician, engineer, mastering etc ==
Albums
Act	Title	Label and catalogue	Year	Role	Notes
Active Ingredient	Building Houses	Bainbridge BCD-2101	1988	Engineer, Post Production Engineer	
Michael Lee Thomas	Fresh Out Of Nowhere	Bainbridge Records BCD6281	1989	Technician	
Sunday Only	Steam Railroading under Thundering Skies	Bainbridge BCD-6242	1993 / 1994	Audio remastering	Co-masterer with Leo De Gar Kulka
Various artists	Crystalize Your Mind	Big Beat Records CDWIKD 131	1994	Technician	
The Mermen	Food For Other Fish	Kelptone Records 0001	1994	Remastering	
Sly & The Family Stone	Slyest Freshest Funkiest Rarist Cuts	Magical Mystery 00002	1995	Transferring	
Canvas	Storyteller	Bay Sound Records BSR7311	2003	Artwork design, liner notes	
Mystic Moods Orchestra	Mystic Moods Orchestra Plays Nighttide	HDS 4502	2004	Remastering	
Mystic Moods Orchestra	More Than Music	HDS 4503	2002	Remastering	
Ronny Cox	How I Love Them Old Songs... Ronny Cox Sings Mickey Newbury	Bay Sound BSR9606	2007	Engineer, Mastering, Mixing	Also released on Wind River 4041 in 2009
Ronny Cox	At The Sebastiani Theatre	Wind River WR4040CD	2008	Mixing	
