= KFRC =

KFRC may refer to:

- KFRC-FM, a radio station (106.9 FM) carrying a simulcast of KCBS and licensed to San Francisco, California, United States
- KZDG, a radio station (1550 AM) licensed to San Francisco, California, United States, which used the call sign KFRC from January 2009 to August 2011
- KFRC (defunct), a radio station (610 AM) licensed to San Francisco, California, United States, which used the call sign KFRC from September 1924 to October 2005
- KMVQ-FM, a radio station (99.7 FM) licensed to San Francisco, California, United States, which used the call sign KFRC-FM from March 1991 to May 2007
- KMEL, a radio station (106.1 FM) licensed to San Francisco, California, United States, which used the call sign KFRC-FM in the 1970s
