= KNEW =

KNEW may refer to:

- The ICAO code for New Orleans Lakefront Airport, located in New Orleans, Louisiana, United States
- KNEW (AM), a radio station on 960 kHz, licensed to San Francisco, California, United States, that carries the KNEW call sign as of January 3, 2012.
- KKSF (AM), a radio station on 910 kHz, licensed to Oakland, California, United States, which carried the KNEW call sign from 1966 to 2012.
- a defunct FM radio station in Portales, New Mexico
- KJRB, a radio station on 790 kHz, licensed to Spokane, Washington, United States, and formerly known as KNEW (1947–1966)
- past tense of know
