= KRBQ =

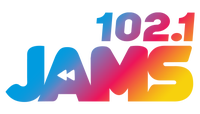
- San Francisco, California; United States
- Broadcast area: San Francisco Bay Area
- Frequency: 102.1 MHz (HD Radio)
- Branding: 102 JAMS

Programming
- Language: English
- Format: Classic hip hop

Ownership
- Owner: Audacy, Inc.; (Audacy License, LLC)
- Sister stations: KCBS, KFRC-FM, KGMZ-FM, KITS, KLLC

History
- First air date: September 1, 1948
- Former call signs: KDFC (1948–2011); KUZX (2011–2014)
- Call sign meaning: Rhythm and blues; "Q" (former branding)

Technical information
- Licensing authority: FCC
- Facility ID: 65486
- Class: B
- ERP: 33,000 watts
- HAAT: 319 meters (1,047 ft)
- Transmitter coordinates: 37.851°N 122.499°W
- Repeater: See § Booster

Links
- Public license information: Public file; LMS
- Webcast: Listen live (via Audacy)
- Website: audacy.com/102jamssf

KRBQ (102.1 FM) is a classic hip hop radio station licensed to San Francisco, California, United States, and owned by Audacy, Inc. The station transmits its signal from Mount Beacon atop the Marin Headlands above Sausalito, California, while studios are located in the KPIX-TV building in the North Beach district of San Francisco.

== History ==
=== Classical KDFC (1948–2011) ===
The station had its inception on September 1, 1948 by station owner Ed Davis and programmed a classical music format as KDFC. It remained a classical station for most of its history, though at one point during the 1950s, it featured a beautiful music format. The station also simulcasted on KIBE, a daytime-only 5 kW AM station in Palo Alto, California that began broadcasting in 1949 from a transmitter near the western approach to the Dumbarton Bridge. It is now a news-talk station. It also had a booster station in Concord, which filled in coverage gaps caused by topography issues.

In 1993, Ed Davis' company Sundial Broadcasting sold the AM and FM to Brown Broadcasting Corporation (BBC) for $15.5 Million. In 1996 BBC sold the FM station and AM simulcast sister station AM 1220 to Evergreen Media, who in turn sold the FM to Bonneville Broadcasting and the AM to Douglas Broadcasting.

In 1997, new station management transitioned KDFC's programming to a more mass-appeal approach, which boosted ratings significantly, though was occasionally criticized for their new "top 40 of classical music" approach.

Bill Leuth, who had done mornings on rival classical station KKHI-FM, moved to mornings at KDFC in 1997, and also contributed to the station's rise and shift from automation to live hosts.

In 2003, KDFC became the first station in the Bay Area to broadcast using HD Radio.

In January 2005, a national controversy erupted when KDFC refused to sell advertising to the gay dating service "8 Guys Out," while taking advertisements for the heterosexual dating service "Table for Six". Speculation was that since KDFC's then-owner, Bonneville International Corporation, was a Mormon-controlled company, the church connection led to the advertising ban. In this light, the policy of then-owner Bonneville did not allow advertising for liquor, lotteries, or casinos.

On January 18, 2007, Bonneville signed an agreement with Entercom Communications Corporation to trade three San Francisco stations — KOIT, KMAX, and KDFC — for three Entercom stations in Seattle, Washington and four in Cincinnati, Ohio. Entercom officially took ownership of KDFC on February 26, 2007.

In March 2007, KDFC pulled a commercial for Chris Hedges' book American Fascists: The Christian Right and the War on America. The ad was tailored to play only in the Bay Area, to promote local appearances by the author. Bill Lueth, KDFC's operations and program director insisted that pulling the ad was not a free-speech issue. "We don't have any issue with their right to advertise this book. It simply doesn't fit the expectation of our listeners on this particular radio station," Lueth said.

=== Classic Rock K-Fox (2011–2014) ===
On January 18, 2011, the University of Southern California announced the purchase of 90.3 KUSF from the University of San Francisco. That same day, a deal, in the works for months prior, was announced to acquire the intellectual property and call letters of KDFC from Entercom, thus making KDFC a listener-supported non-commercial outlet, operated by a San Francisco-based non-profit organization, and also simulcasting on newly acquired 89.9 KNDL in Santa Rosa.

Then, on January 24, 2011, at noon, after playing Fanfare for the Common Man by Aaron Copland as performed by the Cincinnati Pops Orchestra, KDFC flipped to classic rock as "Classic Rock K-Fox" with the new call letters KUZX. The station was a simulcast of San Jose station KUFX, which Entercom acquired earlier in the month. The first song on "K-Fox" was "Roll Over Beethoven" by Electric Light Orchestra.

The station launched with a full airstaff including Greg Kihn in mornings, radio veterans Tim Jeffries and "Big Rick" Stuart in middays and afternoons respectively, and Laura Steele hosting nights.

KUZX never seemed to gain traction with the simulcast, and throughout its tenure, the station saw many on-air changes, including the additions of KFOG veterans Annalisa Parisale for mornings and Bill Webster for nights from 2012 to 2013. After Parisale was let go, the station brought back former K-Fox host Chris Jackson to host mornings.

=== As KRBQ "Q102"/"102 Jams" (2014–present) ===
On August 1, 2014, at 2 p.m., after playing "One Thing Leads to Another" by The Fixx, KUZX abruptly broke away from the simulcast and flipped to a rhythmic adult contemporary format as Q102, The Beat Of The Bay, with the first song being "This Is How We Do It" by Montell Jordan. The format was similar to sister station KHTP in Seattle, which has seen success since launching in August 2013. On August 8, 2014, KUZX changed its call letters to KRBQ to match the new branding. On September 2, after promoting a "Commercial Free August", the station began adding personalities, including Freska in middays, Mia Amor in afternoons, and Hoodrat Miguel hosting nights. On September 15, KRBQ added Bay Area radio veteran Joey "Joey V." Vlasny and Alexx Dupri to host the morning show. KRBQ also bought back a mix show that was once a staple at KNGY, Clubber's Commute, airing Saturday nights.

At the time, KRBQ faced competition from urban KMEL, top 40/CHRs KMVQ, KYLD and KREV, rhythmic top 40 KVVF, rhythmic oldies KISQ (which has since flipped to soft adult contemporary) and adult top 40s KLLC and KIOI. By February 2015, KRBQ dropped current tracks (as well as pop and dance titles), and refocused its direction to the growing classic hip hop format, with occasional 1990s R&B titles, and positioned itself as "The Bay Area's Throwback Station."

On April 2, 2018, KRBQ relieved morning host Mia Amor and afternoon host Hoodrat Miguel of their duties, and later announced that Chuy Gomez would take over the morning slot, which comes after his exit from KVVF the previous January.

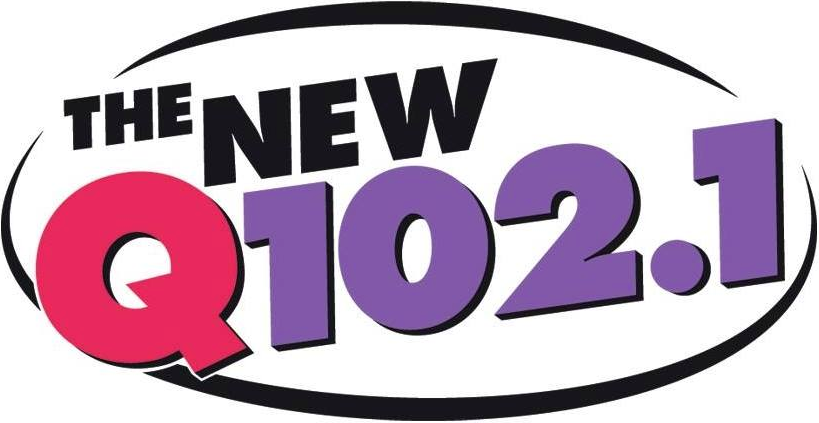
Final logo as Q102.1

At 10 a.m. on August 12, 2019, after playing "Best I Ever Had" by Drake, KRBQ flipped to rhythmic oldies with an emphasis on 1970s through 1990s R&B, while keeping the "Q102" branding. The first song after the relaunch was "Let's Groove" by Earth, Wind & Fire. The move positioned KRBQ closer musically to Bonneville-owned (and former sister station) KBLX, and its new logo had a similar style as that of KISQ ("Kiss FM") that was dropped in early 2016 when it flipped to soft adult contemporary. Ten days later, morning host Chuy Gomez and afternoon host Victor "Big Daddy" Zaragosa were let go from the station.

At 6 a.m. on April 15, 2022, after playing "P.Y.T. (Pretty Young Thing)" by Michael Jackson, KRBQ flipped back to classic hip hop as "102 Jams", the name inspired by the longtime branding of KMEL through the 1990s (as well as copying that of fellow major-city Audacy station WBMX in Chicago). The first song on "102 Jams" was "California Love" by 2Pac featuring Dr. Dre and Roger Troutman. With the format change, previous afternoon host Efren Sifuentes exits, and former Q102 morning host Chuy Gomez returned to the station in his previous spot, having previously hosted mornings from April 2018 until the station's previous relaunch in August 2019.

KRBQ also airs the syndicated "Sunday Night Slow Jams" with R Dub.

== Booster ==
KRBQ is rebroadcast on the following FM booster:

Call sign	Frequency	City of license	FID	ERP (W)	HAAT	Class	FCC info	Notes
KRBQ-FM2	102.1 FM	San Francisco, California	137626	1,000 (Vert.)	893 m (2,930 ft)	D	LMS	(HD Radio)
