= KOSF =

Radio station in San Francisco

- San Francisco, California; United States
- Broadcast area: San Francisco Bay Area
- Frequency: 103.7 MHz (HD Radio)
- Branding: Greatest Hits 103.7

Programming
- Format: Classic hits
- Subchannels: HD2: TikTok Radio
- Affiliations: Premiere Networks

Ownership
- Owner: iHeartMedia; (iHM Licenses, LLC)
- Sister stations: KIOI, KISQ, KKSF, KMEL, KNEW, KYLD

History
- First air date: November 3, 1947
- Former call signs: KGO-FM (1947–1971); KSFX (1971–1982); KGO-FM (1982–1984); KLOK-FM (1984–1987); KKSF (1987–2012)
- Call sign meaning: Previous oldies branding, San Francisco

Technical information
- Licensing authority: FCC
- Facility ID: 65484
- Class: B
- ERP: 6,400 watts
- HAAT: 403 meters (1,322 ft)
- Transmitter coordinates: 37.688°N 122.436°W
- Repeater: 103.7 KOSF-FM2 (Pleasanton)

Links
- Public license information: Public file; LMS
- Webcast: Listen live (via iHeartRadio)
- Website: greatesthits1037.iheart.com

KOSF (103.7 FM) is a commercial radio station licensed to San Francisco, California. It airs a classic hits radio format and is owned by iHeartMedia, Inc. KOSF's studios are on Townsend Street in San Francisco's SoMa district.

KOSF has an effective radiated power (ERP) of 6,400 watts. Its transmitter is located on Colma Road atop San Bruno Mountain in Brisbane. KOSF broadcasts using HD Radio technology.

== History ==
=== KGO-FM and KSFX ===
The station signed on the air on November 3, 1947. Its original call sign was KGO-FM and it was owned by ABC Radio. It mostly simulcast its sister station, KGO 810 AM, and also simulcast The Lawrence Welk Show in stereo with KGO-TV (channel 7). The original frequency was 106.1 MHz, later moving to its current 103.7 MHz.

By the late 1960s, the Federal Communications Commission (FCC) began requiring FM stations to offer separate programming from that of their AM counterparts. KGO-FM, like other ABC-owned FM stations around the country, became an outlet for Love, an automated progressive rock format.

To develop a separate identity from its AM counterpart, KGO-FM changed its call sign to KSFX in early 1971. Its progressive rock format continued until May 1973, when KSFX switched to a Top 40 "Musicradio" approach, similar to WABC in New York City. By late 1974, the station veered towards a dance/soul-flavored format. During the late 1970s, KSFX had a brief run with a disco music format.

In late 1980, KSFX switched to an album-oriented rock (AOR) format modeled after sister station KLOS in Los Angeles and WPLJ in New York. It played the top songs from the best selling rock albums. This lasted until May 1982. Stiff competition from rival rock stations KMEL and CBS-owned KRQR prompted KSFX to drop AOR.

In 1982, the station returned to its KGO-FM call letters and switched to All-Talk, based on 810 KGO's success as San Francisco's top station. While KGO had mostly local talk hosts, KGO-FM featured programs from the ABC-syndicated Talkradio network, along with some local shows.

=== Yes/No Radio KLOK-FM ===
ABC sold the station on January 1, 1984, to Weaver, Davis, Fowler (WDF), which owned KLOK 1170 AM in San Jose. Accordingly, the station was renamed KLOK-FM. (This is not connected with the current KLOK-FM, a Regional Mexican station in Greenfield.)

KLOK-FM had an interactive adult contemporary format called "Yes/No Radio." Listeners would call in their votes on whether songs should remain on or to be removed from the playlist. This only lasted three years.

=== Smooth Jazz KKSF ===
In 1987, the station was sold to Brown Broadcasting Corporation. The call sign was changed to KKSF and under the direction of former KIFM programmer-turned-consultant Bob O'Connor and associate Michael Fischer. They specialized in a format that at first was termed "new adult contemporary" or NAC. The description later evolved to smooth jazz.

KKSF debuted on July 31, 1987, at midnight. The first song played was "Back In The High Life Again" by Steve Winwood. The general manager from 1987 to 1997 was David A. Kendrick. Liner notes of the first "KKSF Sampler for AIDS Relief" list the members of the group responsible for the development of the KKSF concept as Willet Brown, Mike Brown, Dave Kendrick, Phil Melrose, Bob O'Connor, Michael Fischer, and Steve Feinstein.

Steve Feinstein, who had previously been a format editor at trade magazine Radio & Records, was chosen by consultant Bob O'Connor and GM Dave Kendrick to be KKSF's first program director. Until his death in 1996, Feinstein guided KKSF to be one of the leading stations in the NAC/Smooth Jazz format. He was known for being open and responsive to listener comments and suggestions. He constantly searched for new and interesting music that fit the KKSF sound, often gravitating to lesser-known imports and hard-to-find, out-of-print selections.

In 1988, the station teamed with the San Francisco AIDS Foundation to produce their first KKSF Sampler for AIDS Relief album. Songs were donated by the artists so that KKSF could give all the net proceeds from the sale of the Sampler albums to the foundation. Often, the Sampler CDs were the only way to find certain KKSF listener favorites that had otherwise gone out of print. There were seven KKSF Samplers produced by Dave Kendrick and Steve Feinstein, with Sampler 7 being dedicated to Feinstein's memory, as he died in September 1996, during the album's creation.

KKSF was the first commercial radio station to have a presence on the World Wide Web. In October 1993, the station launched a website created by chief engineer Tim Pozar and morning host Roger Coryell, using the URL http://kksf.tbo.com and later http://www.kksf.com. The site was hosted by Internet service provider TLGNet, which was co-founded by Pozar.

=== Changes in ownership ===
In 1993, Brown Broadcasting purchased classical station KDFC (then at 102.1 FM). The two stations were co-located at 455 Market Street until 1997, when both were sold to Evergreen Media. Evergreen sold KDFC to Bonneville International that same year but kept KKSF, which eventually passed to Chancellor Broadcasting, AMFM Broadcasting, and finally Clear Channel Communications during a short period of rapid ownership changes in the late 1990s. Studios were moved to their present location at 340 Townsend Street in 1998.

The sound of KKSF changed with the new ownership. The smooth jazz consultancy Broadcast Architecture became more involved with the station at this time. Gradually, the station became more like other stations in the US using the "Smooth Jazz" handle, dropping some of its more eclectic music along the way in favor of mass appeal R&B songs.

The 2000s brought many changes to KKSF. In 2001, several announcers left, with a number of them going to former sister station KDFC. Former KKSF morning host John Evans joined KDFC where he hosted the afternoon show for seven years. Through the next eight years, the number of live announcers on staff gradually decreased, as KKSF began airing syndicated programming in morning drive, like the national Wake Up with Whoopi show hosted by Whoopi Goldberg, and later The Ramsey Lewis Morning Show, featuring pianist Ramsey Lewis. In 2008, KKSF added The Dave Koz Radio Show in afternoons. By the end of the smooth jazz era at KKSF, only midday personality Miranda Wilson was truly live in her time slot.

=== Classic Rock ===
On May 18, 2009, at 3 pm, KKSF flipped to classic rock, branded as "103.7 The Band". Owner Clear Channel cited economic considerations and the results of "exhaustive market research". The first song on "The Band" was "Everybody's Everything" by Santana. The demise of smooth jazz on KKSF also ended one of the Bay Area's most spirited radio rivalries, that with urban adult contemporary station KBLX-FM, which often included smooth jazz as part of its "quiet storm" format.

In its first few months as "The Band", KKSF increased its listenership among adults ages 25–54, considered a more desirable group by advertisers than KKSF's previous audience, which skewed considerably older. The station featured mostly out-of-market personalities who voice-tracked their shows, and had a very small local staff.

=== Classic Hits KOSF ===
KKSF began shifting towards a classic hits format in February 2011 after Entercom added classic rock on KUZX (using the frequency of KKSF's one-time sister station KDFC). In the Bay Area, the classic hits format had previously been heard on CBS Radio's KFRC-FM, which became a simulcast of all-news KCBS in October 2008.

The transition to classic hits on KKSF was completed on April 8, 2011, at 3 pm, when the station rebranded as "Oldies 103.7". The last song on "The Band" was "Changes" by David Bowie, while the first song on "Oldies" was "I Got You (I Feel Good)" by James Brown. The branding was changed to simply "103.7 FM" in December. On January 3, 2012, KKSF changed its call sign to KOSF.

In November 2013, KOSF adopted a new on-air moniker, "The Bay's 103.7". The station rebranded again on May 2, 2014, at 5 pm, this time to "Big 103.7". No programming or staff changes were made in either case. The first song on "Big" was "Born to Be Wild" by Steppenwolf.

=== 80s Hits ===
Logo as iHeart '80s, 2016-2021

On June 6, 2016, iHeartMedia announced that KOSF would flip to all-1980s hits as "iHeart80s @ 103.7" that day at noon. The change came after its namesake webstream was ranked the most-listened-to stream on the iHeartRadio streaming platform and mobile application for 2016. The last song on Big was "Last Dance" by Donna Summer, and the first song on iHeart80s was "We Built This City" by San Francisco band Starship.

KOSF aired commercial-free for its first eight days. MTV VJ Martha Quinn began hosting the station's morning drive time show on June 14.

Logo as "80s Plus 103.7"

On May 24, 2021, at 10 am, KOSF relaunched with a broader-based classic hits format as "80s Plus 103.7". While 1980s hits still remain the focus of the format, the change saw the station added some songs from the late 1970s and the 1990s. To a certain extent, this brought the station closer to what it was prior to the debut of the prior format. The last song as "iHeart '80s" was "Oh Sherrie" by Hanford native Steve Perry, while the first song as "80s Plus" was "I Love Rock 'n' Roll" by Joan Jett & the Blackhearts.

Shortly after the move, in January 2022, likely due to popularity of her morning show on KOSF, Martha Quinn was chosen to become a national show host across all of iHeart's classic hits stations, including KOSF. Her syndicated show was offered to stations in their midday time slot. To fill in the morning show gap, KOSF promoted Christie James, former midday DJ and co-host of the Martha Quinn Show. Her show was named "Morning Drive with Christie Live". Former show producer Karena Velasquez was promoted to co-host.

=== Return of Classic Hits ===
On August 2, 2024, KOSF became "Classic Hits 103.7", returning to playing 70s and 90s music in addition to the existing 80s playlist.

On October 26, 2026, KOSF shifted its branding to "Greatest Hits 103.7", dropping the "Classic" moniker.

== Booster ==
KOSF is rebroadcast on the following FM booster:

Call sign	Frequency	City of license	FID	ERP (W)	HAAT	Class	FCC info
KOSF-FM2	103.7 FM	Pleasanton, California	86911	185 (Vert.)	1,000 m (3,281 ft)	D	LMS
