= KIOI =

Hot adult contemporary radio station in San Francisco

- San Francisco, California; United States
- Broadcast area: San Francisco Bay Area
- Frequency: 101.3 MHz (HD Radio)
- Branding: Star 101.3

Programming
- Language: English
- Format: Hot adult contemporary
- Subchannels: HD2: Pride Radio (LGBTQ-oriented Dance hits)
- Affiliations: Premiere Networks

Ownership
- Owner: iHeartMedia; (iHM Licenses, LLC)
- Sister stations: KISQ; KKSF; KMEL; KNEW; KOSF; KYLD

History
- First air date: October 27, 1957
- Former call signs: KPEN (1957–1968)
- Call sign meaning: KIOI (frequency is around "101" on an analog tuner)

Technical information
- Licensing authority: FCC
- Facility ID: 34930
- Class: B
- ERP: 125,000 watts
- HAAT: 354 meters (1,161 ft)
- Repeater: See § FM Boosters

Links
- Public license information: Public file; LMS
- Webcast: Listen live (via iHeartRadio)
- Website: 1013.iheart.com

KIOI (101.3 FM, "Star 101.3") is a commercial hot adult contemporary-formatted American radio station licensed to San Francisco, California, United States, and owned by iHeartMedia. The radio studios and offices are in the SoMa district of San Francisco.

KIOI has an effective radiated power (ERP) of 125,000 watts. It is considered a "superpower station" due to this unusually high wattage that is grandfathered into KIOI's license. It is one of two stations in San Francisco broadcasting with more than 100,000 watts, the other being KQED-FM, with 110,000 watts. KIOI's primary transmitter is on Radio Road in Daly City, amid the radio towers for other San Francisco-area FM and TV stations. It also has booster stations on 101.3 MHz in Walnut Creek and Pleasanton.

== KPEN ==
KIOI was first licensed in September 1957, as KPEN, licensed to the San Francisco Peninsula community of Atherton, California by James Gabbert, a Stanford University engineering major; fellow student Gary M. Gielow; and realtor John S. Wickett, doing business as Peninsula FM. The station was assigned to 101.3 MHz, a frequency which had been vacated two years earlier with the deletion of the Oakland Tribune newspaper's KLX-FM, which had begun broadcasting May 3, 1948, simulcasting sister station KLX's programming 17 of the 18 hours it was on daily. KLX-FM was deleted on October 10, 1955.

KPEN debuted on October 27, 1957, with 1,500 watts from a transmitter located on Kings Mountain in the Santa Cruz Mountains. Unusual for the era, KPEN was not affiliated with any stations on the AM band, which meant it had to have 100% original programming. The station put an emphasis on high audio quality, in contrast to other FM stations that did not take advantage of FM broadcasting capabilities. During the day, KPEN played mostly orchestral pop music, switched to a lighter blend of background "dinner music" in the early evening, and then classical music after 8. Eventually, Gabbert and Gielow hosted an evening program called Excursions in Sound, which showcased high fidelity recordings and took advantage of the high-quality broadcast signal.

Two years after KPEN's successful debut, the transmitter was moved to San Bruno Mountain and power increased to 35,000 watts. Then, on August 14, 1964, power was further increased to 125,000 watts, making it the most powerful signal west of the Mississippi River (it was grandfathered in at that power level by the Federal Communications Commission (FCC), which capped stations in that part of the country at 50,000 watts).

KPEN became the first station west of the Mississippi to broadcast in FM stereo, officially beginning August 10, 1961, after a series of field tests. KPEN's technological achievements were recognized by the Electronic Industry Association, the FCC, and President John F. Kennedy. "Excursions in Sound" was renamed "Excursions in Stereo"; hosted by James Gabbert, the show focused on recordings that made good use of stereo. Gabbert also had a Sunday afternoon show Anything Goes that played music, sound effects, and almost anything that dramatically demonstrated the stereo effect.

In the 1960s, the station moved studios from Atherton to San Francisco, first in a SoMa location, then to Nob Hill in a luxurious penthouse atop 1001 California Street at the corner of Mason Street. With this move, the "PEN" in KPEN changed from representing "PENinsula" to representing "PENthouse".

By the mid-1960s, KPEN played primarily orchestral and light vocal performances of pop songs and standards, in competition with similar FM station KFOG (owned by Kaiser Broadcasting).

== K-101 ==
On December 1, 1968, KPEN changed its callsign to KIOI ("K-101"), considered an innovative matching of call letters to a dial position. Eventually, the station added pop and rock music to its MOR playlist, to compete with upstart freeform rock stations KMPX and KSAN. Gabbert aggressively began promoting the station via outdoor advertising, which was a first for the market. "K-101" is likely the first station in the country to develop what is now called the adult contemporary format. Even though KIOI's programming was mainly focused on music, it also featured many popular on-air personalities over the years including Don Kelly, Bill Keffury, Hoyt Smith and Jeff Serr.

By 1970, K-101 advertised itself as being at 101 on the FM dial and had the address of 1001 California Street, with zip code 94101.

During the 1970s, Gabbert developed another lasting technological achievement as KIOI became the first station in the country to develop circular polarization, which was a key element to FM reception in automobiles, which used to be difficult. Gabbert also experimented with quadraphonic sound (in association with RKO General's KFMS). By the mid-1970s, Gabbert purchased KSAY, changing its call sign to KIQI. Originally programmed as an oldies station, by the end of the decade, it was flipped to a Spanish language format.

In September 1980, Gabbert sold KIOI to Charter Company for $12.5 million, then the highest price paid for an FM station. He then purchased KEMO-TV (Channel 20) in San Francisco, changing the callsign to KTZO ("TV 20"). Gabbert later returned to local radio when he purchased KHIT-FM, KOFY (1050 AM) and KDIA (1310 AM). KIOI was profitable, however, various management tweaked the format to compete with market leader KOIT at various times, leaning softer-AC or towards hot AC, which they retained throughout the 80s. On February 8, 1996, sister station WYNY in New York City simulcast KIOI for a day as part of a week-long stunt of simulcasting sister stations nationwide before flipping formats to rhythmic adult contemporary as WKTU.

== Star 101.3 ==
Logo from 2001 to 2021

During the late 1990s, KIOI was flanked by soft AC KOIT and the emerging CHR KZQZ, and suffered in the ratings. The re-emergence of the CHR format by core artists such as Backstreet Boys, NSYNC, Britney Spears, and Christina Aguilera forced KIOI to a hot AC format and re-branded itself as "The New K-101". The station remained competitive; however, the station suffered an identity crisis as the ratings did not improve with the hot AC approach. On November 16, 2000, the station rebranded itself as "Star 101.3" and debuted an exclusive "all-80s hits" format that had been successful in other markets, especially in San Jose on sister station KCNL, as well as Portland and Seattle. The first song on "Star" was "Don't You (Forget About Me)" by Simple Minds. "Star" was programmed by KCNL Program Director Gary Schoenwetter, who brought San Francisco legend and former KITS-FM jock Steve Masters for Afternoon Drive. In 2001, KIOI was the flagship station for Martha Quinn's Rewind, a program hosted by former MTV veejay Martha Quinn and carried on at least four other Clear Channel stations in the United States. Though the station performed well for a while with its 1980s format, management decided to take the station back to the hot AC format and abandoned the 1980s format (which was picked up 14 years later by sister station KOSF) by January 2002, while letting go Schoenwetter, Masters, and other on-air talent.

Throughout the changes, local morning host Don Bleu has remained consistent and more importantly, a ratings success through various co-hosts Renee Brinkley (1998–2002), Uzette Salazar (2002–2006), April Sommers (2006–2010) and Trish Jentz (2010–present). Bleu is a Minnesota native, who was also well-known at KYUU in San Francisco and KDWB in Minneapolis. Popular show segments during Bleu's morning show included Bleuper calls (prank calls to unsuspecting listeners), The Daily Dish (entertainment gossip), and the Bleu Room, an in-studio lounge session that featured acts including Dido, Natasha Bedingfield, Matchbox Twenty and others performing acoustic versions of their hits.

Since June 30, 2008, afternoon drive has been hosted by the nationally syndicated On Air with Ryan Seacrest program with cut-aways to local traffic by Dina Lawrence. Also in the line-up is the hot adult contemporary version of American Top 40 with Ryan Seacrest, which airs on Sunday mornings.

In January 2012, Bleu moved over to mornings at sister station KOSF. In June, Frosty Stillwell, formerly of KLSX in Los Angeles, and Sandy Stec, formerly of KEZR in San Jose, were announced as KIOI's new morning hosts. (Frosty would later leave the station and be replaced by Marcus D. Najera, formerly of KLLC).

== Boosters ==
Broadcast translators for KIOI
| Call sign | Frequency | City of license | FID | ERP (W) | HAAT | Class | Transmitter coordinates | FCC info | Notes |
|---|---|---|---|---|---|---|---|---|---|
| KIOI-FM1 | 101.3 FM | Walnut Creek, California | 4085 | 150 (Vert.) | 300 m (984 ft) | D | 37°55′58.80″N 122°7′19.20″W | LMS | No HD Radio |
| KIOI-FM2 | 101.3 FM | Pleasanton, California | 90740 | 900 (Vert.) | 358 m (1,175 ft) | D | 37°39′32.40″N 121°55′55.20″W | LMS | HD Radio |

== HD Programming ==
On January 19, 2006, Star 101.3 began broadcasting on an HD Radio digital subchannels. It originally had an All '80s music format, reflecting the time when the station aired 1980s hits upon rebranding itself as Star 101.3 from K-101. The music featured the best songs from the 1980s from The Police, Prince, Michael Jackson, Madonna, Cyndi Lauper, and more.

The format was later replaced with a dance hits format, carrying iHeartRadio's "Pride Radio" service, targeting the LGBTQ community.
