= KLX =

KLX may refer to:

- KKSF (AM), a radio station (910 AM) licensed to Oakland, California, United States, as "KLX" from 1922 to 1959
- KLX-FM, a defunct radio station (94.1 FM) in Oakland California in the late 1940s and early 1950s.
- Kalamata International Airport, an international airport in Greece assigned IATA code "KLX"
- kilolux, an SI unit of illumination equal to 10^{3} lux
