= Keith Naftaly =

American music industry executive (born 1962)

- Born: 1962 (age 63–64); San Francisco, California
- Education: University of California, Berkeley
- Occupation: A&R executive
- Years active: 1985 - present
- Employer: RCA Records
- Website: rcarecords.com

Keith Phillip Naftaly (born 1962) is an American music industry executive. He is the president of A&R at RCA Records. Naftaly previously held senior A&R positions at record companies including Arista, DreamWorks Records, and Sony Music. He has worked with artists including Pentatonix, Kesha, Whitney Houston, Kelly Clarkson, Luther Vandross, Sia and Christina Aguilera.

A radio programmer prior to the start of his label career, Naftaly introduced hip hop to a mainstream audience in the mid-80s, creating the "first multi-cultural pop radio station" as the program director of San Francisco's KMEL.

== Early life ==
Naftaly was born in San Francisco and grew up in the Miraloma Park neighborhood. His father, Stanley Naftaly, was a chemist. His mother, Bryna, was a community activist, and advocated for the desegregation of schools. Naftaly began attending a majority black school in Hunters Point. Although Naftaly studied classical piano as a child, he also took interest in popular music, especially R&B played on local radio station KDIA.

After graduating from Lowell High School in 1980, Naftaly attended the University of California, Berkeley and briefly worked for student station KALX.

== Career ==
While a student at UC Berkeley, Naftaly took a night shift job answering request lines at San Francisco top-40 station KFRC after dissatisfaction with KALX. Naftaly also explored the workings of KFRC's music department and made connections with record promoters. He eventually dropped out of college to produce KFRC's morning show with Don Rose.

In 1984, Naftaly became assistant music director for KMEL, which had recently switched from its "Camel" rock format to top-40. He was named music director in 1985. In 1987 he won The Gavin Report Music Director of the Year award, and later that year, at the age of 24, Naftaly became KMEL's program director. He programmed rap and hip hop records, breaking the "segregated institution" of American radio, and moved KMEL from a general top-40 to a rhythmic format. By early 1988, KMEL's ratings share rose from 4.9 to 6.1, enough to be the Bay Area's highest rated music station.

KMEL was the top rated radio station in San Francisco for the five years that Naftaly served as its program director. In 1993, he was named VP of Programming at KKBT/The Beat, a Los Angeles rhythm station that shared ownership with KMEL. He moved to Los Angeles, and had similar success, with KKBT becoming the most listened-to music station in Los Angeles.

Noted for his ability to identify hit records, Naftaly was pursued by record companies for a&r positions throughout his radio career, In 1995, recruited by Clive Davis, he accepted a "much-negotiated" position as VP A&R at Arista Records. Focused on finding songs and picking singles for the label's artists, Naftaly's credits at Arista included the Waiting to Exhale soundtrack album and Santana's Supernatural, and hit records by artists such as Monica (Miss Thang), Deborah Cox ("Nobody's Supposed to Be Here"), Next ("Too Close"), Brandy and Monica ("The Boy is Mine"). He worked closely with Whitney Houston on the 1999 album My Love is Your Love, her first studio album in eight years. Produced by Wyclef Jean, Missy Elliott and Rodney Jerkins, among others, it "brought her into the present with pure finesse.".

In 2000, Davis was ousted from Arista. He launched J Records and appointed Naftaly senior vice president of A&R. Over the course of his tenure at J, Naftaly worked on platinum-selling albums by artists including Rod Stewart, and Kelly Clarkson as well as Luther Vandross's final album, the acclaimed Dance with My Father.

Naftaly left J in 2003. He subsequently held senior A&R positions at DreamWorks Records, Sony Music, and RCA/Jive. He was named executive vice president and head of A&R at RCA Records in 2012, and president of A&R in 2018. His credits at RCA include Pink's Beautiful Trauma, the Kesha comeback album Rainbow, and G-Eazy's The Beautiful & Damned. He has worked closely with Pentatonix and Sia.
