= KISQ =

Soft adult contemporary radio station in San Francisco

Coordinates: 37.851°N 122.498°W

- San Francisco, California; United States
- Broadcast area: San Francisco Bay Area
- Frequency: 98.1 MHz (HD Radio)
- Branding: 98.1 The Breeze

Programming
- Language: English
- Format: Soft adult contemporary
- Affiliations: Premiere Networks

Ownership
- Owner: iHeartMedia; (iHM Licenses, LLC)
- Sister stations: KIOI; KKSF; KMEL; KNEW; KOSF; KYLD

History
- First air date: July 17, 1958
- Former call signs: KAFE (1958–1965); KABL-FM (1965–1995); KBGG (1995–1997)
- Call sign meaning: Sounds like "Kiss" (former branding)

Technical information
- Licensing authority: FCC
- Facility ID: 59964
- Class: B
- ERP: 75,000 watts
- HAAT: 309.6 meters (1,016 ft)
- Repeater: See § Boosters

Links
- Public license information: Public file; LMS
- Webcast: Listen live (via iHeartRadio)
- Website: 981thebreeze.iheart.com

KISQ (98.1 FM) is a commercial radio station licensed to San Francisco. It broadcasts a soft adult contemporary radio format, known as "The Breeze", and is owned by iHeartMedia. The radio studios and offices are in the SoMa district of San Francisco.

KISQ's transmitter is on Wolfback Ridge Road in Sausalito, California, within the Golden Gate National Recreation Area. KISQ broadcasts using HD Radio technology. The station also has booster stations on 98.1 MHz in Concord and Pleasanton.

== History ==
=== KAFE ===
The station first signed on the air on July 17, 1958, as KAFE, with a classical music format. KAFE was owned and built by engineer Dan Solo, who had previously worked at KRE (1400 AM, now KVTO). Saying that automation made operating a station cheaper, he applied for a license in 1957.

Solo's first proposed transmitter site, a 50 ft (15 m) tower at his home, wound up violating a zoning ordinance, and KAFE signed on from a site atop Grizzly Peak. Solo sold his station to Hal Cox in 1959; Cox relocated the tower to Sausalito.

=== KABL-FM ===
In 1965, the McLendon-Pacific Corporation acquired KAFE and paired it with its existing station, KABL (960 AM, now KNEW). KABL-FM featured a beautiful music/easy listening format. It played quarter hour sweeps of mostly instrumental cover versions of popular songs, as well as Broadway and Hollywood show tunes. The call sign KABL stood for "cable cars", a San Francisco attraction. The station often played the sound effect of the bell from a cable card when identifying itself.

By the early 1990s, the format had given way to soft adult contemporary, and competed directly with KOIT, which had successfully made the same transition a few years earlier. The format was a modest success, although it was unable to overcome KOIT's dominance in the ratings. On March 15, 1993, KABL-FM re-branded as "B98", and transitioned to a mainstream AC format focused on hit songs from the 1980s and 1990s, placing the station between soft AC KOIT and hot AC KIOI. The move did little to improve the station's ratings.

=== KBGG ===
On February 14, 1994, KABL-FM switched to a 1970s-based classic hits format, branded as "K-Big 98.1". Jay Peterson was music director during this time. The call letters were changed to KBGG on January 2, 1995. Later that year, Shamrock Broadcasting of Burbank, California, reached a deal to sell KBGG, as well as KNEW (910 AM), KABL, and KSAN-FM (94.9), to Chancellor Media.

The format was a moderate success. The station later expanded its playlist to include songs from the late 1960s and early 1980s.

=== KISQ ===
==== Kiss FM ====
Logo, 1997–2009

Logo, 2010

Logo, 2010–2012

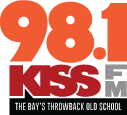
Logo, 2015–2016

On July 22, 1997, after playing "No Matter What" by Badfinger, KBGG began stunting with sounds of radio tuning and ground control transmissions, while promoting a new format to come. At 1 p.m. the next day, Chancellor Media (later to become AMFM, Inc. then Clear Channel Communications, and later iHeartMedia) flipped KBGG to urban AC as KISQ, "98.1 Kiss FM". The first song on "Kiss FM" was "Let's Groove" by Earth, Wind & Fire.

KISQ leaned heavily on a format similar to classic soul/urban oldies, with a playlist of more old school R&B music with occasionally few new R&B songs (mostly mainstream with no neo-soul). This may have helped garner a diverse audience of blacks, Latinos, whites and Asians. The station's owners may have also formatted the playlist this way not only to protect longtime urban contemporary-sister station KMEL, which plays some old school in addition to current Hip Hop/R&B, but to differentiate itself from competitor KBLX, which plays new and old R&B. By 2008, rhythmic AC competitor KMVQ took on the Top 40 format at the time the "MOViN' " format declined in popularity, allowing KISQ to evolve its format to a more rhythmic AC direction.

By 2011, the station was described as having a gold-based rhythmic oldies format, with no currents. It also began playing a few new wave hits from the 1980s from artists such as The Police and Human League. At the same time as the format adjustment, the station changed its logo to one bearing resemblance to a logo most urban oldies/rhythmic oldies used during the peak time of the format in the late 1990s to early 2000s.

In June 2015, the station added "Throwback" to its slogan while adding some classic hip-hop in its playlist, removing the new wave and disco tracks from the station (most of which moved over to sister KOSF), in order to better compete with new competitor KRBQ. The next month, the station reduced most of the classic hip hop tracks in favor of more familiar upbeat R&B and dance tracks, as well as ballads.

==== 98.1 The Breeze ====
On April 13, 2016, at 2 p.m., after playing "Kiss and Say Goodbye" by The Manhattans and "End of the Road" by Boyz II Men, KISQ flipped back to soft adult contemporary as "98.1 The Breeze". The first song on "The Breeze" was "Easy" by The Commodores. Core artists of the format include Adele, Whitney Houston, Mariah Carey, Billy Joel, Madonna, Lionel Richie, Elton John and George Michael.

Due to KISQ's success, iHeart launched "The Breeze" in several other cities. There are now stations branded as "The Breeze" (or a variant thereof) in a number of radio markets in the U.S. and Canada, some owned by iHeartMedia and a few with other owners. iHeartRadio also has a soft AC channel called "The Breeze" on its app. About 30 iHeartMedia FM stations around the U.S. air the service on one of their HD Radio digital subchannels.

== Boosters ==
KISQ is rebroadcast on the following FM boosters:

Call sign	Frequency	City of license	FID	ERP (W)	HAAT	Class	FCC info
KISQ-FM2	98.1 FM	Pleasanton, California	59993	10,000 (Vert.)	−55 m (−180 ft)	D	LMS
KISQ-FM3	98.1 FM	Concord, California	59973	1,000 (Vert.)	884 m (2,900 ft)	D	LMS
