= The Dog House (talk show) =

American radio talk show

- Genre: Comedy; talk
- Running time: 4 hours (approximately)
- Country of origin: United States
- Created by: JV, Elvis
- Original release: 1993 to March 2008 (first run) – October 2009 to present (second run)
- Website: www.doghousefm.com

The Dog House is an American radio talk show that was originally hosted by JV (Jeff Vandergrift) and co-hosted by Elvis (Dan Lay). The show was previously based in New York City on 92.3 Free FM, and prior to that aired on Clear Channel's Wild 94.9 in the San Francisco Bay Area. The New York show was canceled in May 2007, due to a controversy over a segment that it aired involving a prank call to a Chinese restaurant. The co-hosts and the producer were subsequently fired by the station and CBS Radio. In March 2008, they began broadcasting a new show via the web.

== History ==
The Dog House starred Jeffrey "JV" Vandergrift (born March 16, 1968) and Dan "Elvis" Lay. The two met in 1993 and have been radio cohosts together for over 15 years, (along with JV's high school friend and show producer "Hollywood" Lance Otani) starting on Hot 97.7 in San Jose, California. In 1995, program directors Michael Martin and Joe Cunningham of Wild 107 eagerly hired them to fill a timeslot vacated by Mancow Muller. The Dog House quickly became a household name after joining Wild 107.7 (which subsequently moved to Wild 94.9), as they became the #1 rated morning show in the Bay Area receiving higher ratings than Howard Stern; only to be terminated nearly a decade later due to off-air controversy. Shortly after being fired from Wild 94.9, they helped launch KIFR at the end of 2005 before moving to New York City, where they joined 92.3 Free FM. The new show went under the title JV & Elvis during the first few months until the hosts revived The Dog House name. Two years later they were fired again by CBS Radio in New York for an on-air prank.

=== Post free FM ===
The Dog House hosted a show on their website. It was a multimedia broadcast enabling JV and Elvis to display pictures and video as well as audio. On May 15, 2008, Elvis left, expressing a desire to return to terrestrial radio. JV continued to host the show alone. On February 16, 2009, JV announced he would be coming back to Wild 94.9 (KYLD), the same station that he and the Dog House were fired from in 2005. JV's show started on Monday, February 23, and aired 6 am – 10 am.

On Monday morning, October 12, 2009, Elvis restarted The Dog House as his morning show on KFRH/KREV basing it both in Las Vegas (KFRH) and the San Francisco Bay Area (KREV). The show rotated its broadcast home between studios in the two cities.

In August 2014, the duo announced that they would be restarting The Dog House show, this time starting with weekly podcasts using the online-based Stitcher Radio. They have since aired several podcasts, but have repeatedly stated that they want to focus more on talk radio, rather than "stunts, pranks, etc". To advertise their reunion, JV, Elvis, and Natasha Yi co-starred in a short film series called "Behind the House".

== Personalities ==
=== Hosts ===
Host JV (Jeff Vandergrift) and Elvis (Dan Lay) both co-hosted The Dog House radio show.

==== JV Disappearance and Death ====
JV was married to model and actress Natasha Yi. The two married following a live on-air proposal in San Francisco.

JV shared health details on Wild 94.9 on April 4, 2022, that he was suffering from Lyme disease which was severely impacting his brain and life. On February 23 2023, he shared an update on his health while on air, discussing potential treatment options proposed by doctors. A few hours after making this final broadcast, JV went missing. His wife, Natasha Yi, released this statement:

Thank you to our friends and the entire i-HeartRadio family and listeners for your love, support and prayers. I can feel your love and energy for JV, and I am so grateful for it. The amount of compassion for the physical torture JV has been going through for the past two years has been overwhelming.

I have been in so much pain and fear and I know all of you have been so scared and concerned for JV as well. JV and I have always considered this community part of our family, so I want to let you know that personal information has recently been discovered that leads us to believe JV will not be coming back. I tell you this with incredible pain and sadness in my heart.

At this time, JV officially remains missing according to the SFPD [San Francisco Police Department], but no foul play is suspected in his disappearance. We are incredibly appreciative for the SFPD's ongoing efforts in locating JV and they have asked us to keep the details to immediate family only. I know how painful this is for you to hear – please know that I have you in my thoughts.

Please forgive my silence during this time – my heart is utterly broken, and the pain feels unbearable. I will do my best to provide updates and I ask for you to please keep JV in your thoughts and prayers.

On March 23, KYLD announced that he had died. His body was discovered the previous day in the San Francisco Bay, near Pier 39.

=== Previous Dog House members ===
- "Hollywood" (Lance Otani) – Producer for the show during its run at Wild 94.9, Hollywood was considered the third member of the Dog House beside JV and Elvis. Having a wife and several children, Hollywood chose not to move with the show to New York.

=== Former The Dog House staff ===
- "Big Joe" (Joe Lopez) – The street guy for The Dog House during the Wild 94.9 and previously KHQT, Hot 97.7 era.
- "Hammerin Hank" (Henry Ochs) – A fan of The Dog House who is on the autism spectrum and was hired as an intern at KYLD and even received his own radio show on Sunday afternoons. He hosted a radio show twice a week on 89.3 KOHL in Fremont and has also served as the station's Public Service Director. He currently hosts a weekly radio show on KCRH 89.9 FM in Hayward and also hosts a weekly Podcast called "The Hammerin Hank Show with Ryan Hoppe" for a Podcast company called Ride The Wave Media." He was recently hired as an on-air personality for Hot 97-7, an internet radio station based in Fresno, California.
- "White Menace" (Jason McMurry) – Assistant producer for the show at Wild 94.9. He later became a member of The Woody Show on ALT 98.7 (KYSR).
- "Showbiz" – Currently co-hosting mornings on KDON-FM (102.5).
- "DJ Greg Lopez" – Currently DJing in Las Vegas (Sin City).

== Controversy ==
=== Feud with Brad Kava ===
Throughout its history, the show had a feud with Brad Kava, a broadcast columnist for the San Jose Mercury News. The station once responded to his negative reviews of The Dog House with a large ad in the newspaper that read: "FUN RADIO IS BACK Bringing You a Mad-Kap Cup of Morning Java!" with two hands framing a photo of JV & Elvis. But when folded inward, similar to a MAD fold-in, the ad then read "FUCK Brad Kava" with the hands forming an upraised middle finger. Over 10 years later, the Dog House invited Kava as a guest on their internet show to work out their differences; Kava even praised the show, saying they were "pioneering a new medium".

=== Feud with Opie & Anthony ===
On September 28, 2006, The Opie & Anthony Show, which immediately precedes The Dog House, was extended half an hour into The Dog House's time slot and CBS Radio played fifteen minutes of commercials before The Dog House was allowed on the air. JV and Elvis complained on the air about having to wait, which prompted Opie and Anthony to call into the show. The hosts from the two shows then engaged in a bitter argument. The following day, Opie and Anthony intentionally ran overtime by almost twenty minutes to anger The Dog House. In response, The Dog House fans showed support for The Dog House during their on-location broadcast (live from the Javitz center) by shouting chants such as "Opie and Anthony suck". The two shows later made up their differences after Don Imus was fired by CBS.

=== Prank call to a Chinese restaurant ===
On April 20, 2007, JV replayed a six-minute-long segment of a prank call to a Chinese restaurant that was first broadcast on April 5. The call featured an exaggerated voice using racial stereotypes (examples include "Chinese man, tell me about your tiny egg roll... your tiny egg roll in your pants", "Should I come to your restaurant so that I can see you naked... that way I can see your hot Asian spicy ass", and "You are a very nice Chinese man... probably can't drive for shit, but who cares."). Several Chinese American special interest groups, including the Organization of Chinese Americans, were outraged by this segment, describing it as "racist, vulgar and sexist". On April 23, the duo were suspended indefinitely without pay. JV apologized on the show the following Monday. The show was later canceled, with CBS Radio spokeswoman Karen Mateo stating: "The Dog House with JV and Elvis will no longer be broadcast."

== Media ==
At KYLD, The Dog House branched out into comedy CDs and DVDs, most of which were given away to listeners or sold by local music shops and online.

=== Audio ===
- 1995 – Doghouse Bites Vol. I
- 1996 – Doghouse Bites Vol. II
- 1997 – You Want Trouble?
- 1999 – How Many People Must Get Dissed?
- 2002 – Stop Eye-Balling Me Boy!
- Still The King – Doghouse Greg Lopez
- King Of Turntables – Doghouse Greg Lopez
- Traffic Jams Vol. 1 – Doghouse Greg Lopez
- Mix Allstars – The Doghouse
- Afterhours (multiple) – Doghouse Greg Lopez

=== Video ===
- 1997 – Dog House Raw (VHS)
- 1997 – Doghouse Too Raw (VHS)
- 1999 – Radio Kings (VHS)
- 2001 – Radio Kings 2 (VHS)
- 2003 – Maybe You Should... (DVD)
