= Joseph E. Marshall =

American activist, writer and academic (born 1947)

- Born: Joseph E. Marshall, Jr.
- Education: University of San Francisco, San Francisco State University, Wright Institute
- Occupations: Educator, civil rights activist, author, broadcaster
- Known for: Co-founder Omega Boys Club, Street Soldiers radio show host, violence prevention
- Website: Official website

Joseph Earl Marshall, Jr. (born 1947) is an American author, lecturer, radio talk show host, and community activist.

== Biography ==
Marshall grew up in St. Louis, Missouri and the South Central part of Los Angeles, California. He graduated from Loyola High School of Los Angeles, the University of San Francisco with a BA in political science and sociology (1968), San Francisco State University in 1974 with an M.A. in Education, and the Wright Institute with a Ph.D. in Psychology. Marshall became a teacher at Woodrow Wilson High School of San Francisco in 1969 after getting his B.A. In 1994, Marshall left his teaching job to become an anti-violence activist.

San Francisco urban contemporary station KMEL hired Marshall to host the Sunday night talk show Street Soldiers after local rapper MC Hammer hosted the November 1991 debut show. The show continues to air every Sunday night from 8-10pm PST and focuses on discussing critical issues and events affecting the African American community and its youth.

He is the founder of 501c(3) non-profit organization Alive & Free, the mission of which is to keep young people alive and free, unharmed by violence and free from incarceration. Alive & Free operates under the principles of treating violence like a disease. Like any disease, there are specific risk factors, symptoms, and a prescription for healing or prevention. Marshall also founded the Street Soldiers National Consortium, a group of activists dedicated to preventing violence nationwide.

== Personal life ==
Marshall is Catholic.

== Awards ==
- 2004 Ashoka Fellow
- 1994 MacArthur Fellows Program
- Leadership Award from the Children's Defense Fund
- Essence Award honoring outstanding contributions by African American men
- 1996 Martin Luther King, Jr. Memorial Award from the National Educational Association
- 2001 "Use Your Life Award" from Oprah Winfrey's Angel Network.
- 2012 "Best Community-Oriented Radio Program Award" from SF Weekly for Street Soldiers

== Works ==
- Street Soldier, One Man's Struggle to Save a Generation, One Life at a Time, Delacorte Press, 1996, ISBN 978-0-385-31430-5
