= KNEW (AM) =

Radio station in Oakland, California, United States

- Oakland, California; United States
- Broadcast area: San Francisco Bay Area
- Frequency: 960 kHz
- Branding: iHeart Sports Talk + More 960 KNEW

Programming
- Format: Sports and conservative talk
- Affiliations: 24/7 News; Fox Sports Radio; Premiere Networks; Athletics

Ownership
- Owner: iHeartMedia; (iHM Licenses, LLC)
- Sister stations: KIOI, KISQ, KKSF, KMEL, KOSF, KYLD

History
- First air date: 1925 (as KROW)
- Former call signs: KFWM (1925–1930); KROW (1930–1959); KABL (1959–2004); KQKE (2004–2007); KKGN (2007–2012)
- Call sign meaning: Former calls of KKSF from 1966–2012; intended to mirror the calls of WNEW, 910's former sister station in New York

Technical information
- Licensing authority: FCC
- Facility ID: 59957
- Class: B
- Power: 5,000 watts unlimited
- Transmitter coordinates: 37°49′39.7″N 122°18′56.9″W

Links
- Public license information: Public file; LMS
- Webcast: Listen live (via iHeartRadio)
- Website: iheartsportsbayarea.iheart.com

KNEW (960 AM) is an American radio station licensed to Oakland, California, and serving the San Francisco Bay Area. It is owned by iHeartMedia and offers a hybrid sports and conservative talk format. Most of the programming comes from Fox Sports Radio and Premiere Networks. KNEW also carries Athletics baseball games. The station's studios are located in the SoMa district of San Francisco.

KNEW transmits 5,000 watts using a three-tower array directional antenna at all times. The transmitter is located in Oakland at the eastern end of the San Francisco-Oakland Bay Bridge. KNEW was previously heard on the HD Radio digital subchannel of 103.7 KOSF-HD2.

== History ==
=== KFWM and KROW ===
On July 8, 1925, the station signed on as KFWM. It was owned originally by the Oakland Educational Society. The Oakland Post-Enquirer wanted a radio station to compete with the Oakland Tribune's KLX. This station became KROW in June 1930, and used those call letters until 1959. It was a full-service station known for launching the career of comedian Phyllis Diller and for helping the career of "the world's greatest disc jockey" Don Sherwood, prior to his long career at KSFO.

In 1947, the station built a new transmitter on a 20-acre island leased from the Port of Oakland. The new transmitter was accompanied by an increase in power from 1,000 watts to 5,000 watts full-time.

=== KABL ===
This station is best known as the longtime home of KABL, the successor to KROW and one of the first beautiful music stations in the United States. It was owned by 1950s radio pioneer Gordon McLendon. According to longtime McLendon national program director, Don Keyes, in his book Gordon McLendon and Me, McLendon wanted to own a station in the San Francisco market, and 960 KROW seemed ideal because of its relatively low dial position and strong coverage of the San Francisco market.

==== Beautiful music ====
McLendon had success with Top 40 stations and the original plan had been to launch a similar, youthful format on KROW. But after McLendon and his team visited the market and discovered there were already several Top 40 stations, they decided there was not room for another one. As a result, they looked to KIXL, a beautiful music station in the Dallas-Fort Worth, Texas, market that was enjoying a fair amount of success despite being daytime-only. They decided to launch a similar format on KROW using KIXL's formula of quarter-hour blocks of familiar musical selections (three instrumentals, arranged by tempo, and one vocal) as a template. The new call sign was to be KABL, as in San Francisco's legendary cable cars.

In early May 1959, KROW began stunting with a continuous loop of a song called "Gila Monster", the theme song from a horror film that Gordon McLendon had co-produced that year. Based on this stunt, it was assumed by the general public — and by the competition — that KROW was to become a Top 40 station along the lines of McLendon's KLIF in Dallas, WAKY in Louisville or KILT in Houston. But McLendon took everyone by surprise by debuting KABL as a beautiful music station. KABL quickly captured a more mature listening audience that disliked rock and roll. KABL soon became the number one radio station in San Francisco, and would remain at or near the top of the ratings for years afterward.

==== KABL's format ====
As KABL, the station combined a mixture of easy listening string and orchestra music with light classics and an occasional Latin cocktail hour tune. KABL was known for presenting poetic vignettes about San Francisco life, a harp interlude between songs, and a cable car bell to announce the news.

Licensed to Oakland, with a transmitter near the east end of the San Francisco–Oakland Bay Bridge, KABL often skirted the Federal Communications Commission (FCC) rules on station identification and city of license. While KABL could have legally identified as "Oakland/San Francisco", it instead deliberately tried to identify with San Francisco rather than Oakland. It was notorious for using slogans such as "KABL Oakland, serving San Francisco on your San Francisco radio dial, in the air, everywhere over San Francisco". This raised the ire of FCC officials, resulting in a fine and an admonishment to all broadcasters that they were licensed to serve a particular community, not surrounding ones.

==== The final years ====
In 1997, the station switched to an adult standards format of traditional pop and big band music. At one point, presumably inspired by the "swing dancing/zoot suits" craze of the late 1990s, KABL added a nightly "swing/dance" show several hours in length, which played music by the retro swing groups of the period such as Brian Setzer's and the Cherry Poppin' Daddies, as well as standard material such as Glenn Miller's "In The Mood". This program did not last very long.

KABL also carried the syndicated When Radio Was Old-Time Radio anthology series, tending to move its time slot around. In 2000, KABL briefly switched to a 1960s-1970s soft rock format, but went back to older music after complaints from their regular audience. In fact, later-years KABL tended to go back and forth on including greater amounts of more "modern" softer pop-rock material then not identified with "traditional" adult standards - Peter & Gordon and Dusty Springfield from the 1960s, even Kenny Rogers and Air Supply from the turn of the 1980s.

On September 28, 2004, 960 AM dropped the adult standards programming and the KABL call letters. The KABL call sign subsequently reemerged at then co-owned 92.1 FM in Walnut Creek, California. The station had a very limited signal beyond its immediate broadcast area, however, and in July 2005, switched to an adult contemporary music format.

==== KABL reborn on the Internet ====
KABL then began broadcasting as an internet radio station. This lasted until January 31, 2007, when Clear Channel Communications discontinued KABL's streaming music.

On June 1, 2007, under license from Clear Channel, the Bay Area Radio Museum launched a streaming tribute to KABL on the Internet, which featured beautiful music, easy listening, adult standards, big bands, traditional pop and middle-of-the-road music, to represent the various musical styles presented during the station's forty years on the air.

=== Progressive talk as KQKE and KKGN ===
Replacing KABL on September 28, 2004, were new call letters KQKE and a progressive talk format, branded as "960 The Quake". The Quake's tag lines are "The Bay Area Home of Air America", "Talk Radio for the Rest of Us" and "Talk Radio from the Left". The station carried a mix of Dial Global programs, such as Ed Schultz, Stephanie Miller and Thom Hartmann, and other distributors. At one time it also carried programs from the now-defunct Air America network.

The station also aired some local weekend programming. One weekend show, Shake!, aired on Sunday nights and was targeted toward the Bay Area's gay and lesbian community. The show also aired on co-owned KLSD in San Diego until November 2007.

In 2006, KQKE introduced a local morning show featuring political satirist Will Durst and former San Francisco mayor Willie Brown. Keeping it Real with Will and Willie aired from 7 a.m. to 10 a.m. Monday through Friday. The show was canceled, and aired its final regular broadcast on September 29, 2006. At that time, the program director indicated that "the pair will still do special broadcasts and appearances for the station."

John Scott was hired as AM operations manager for both KQKE and KNEW in 2007, and introduced new shows and elements into the programming mix. He would be the last local manager of the stations, with those duties now handled by Clear Channel corporate.

In 2009, the station introduced another weekend program, An Organic Conversation, airing Saturdays at 10am PST. Presented by Helge Hellberg, executive director of Marin Organic, and Mark Mulcahy, organic produce consultant, An Organic Conversation features ecology-based thinking and insight into the organic food and holistic health movement.

The Progressive News Hour with John Scott once aired weekdays from 6 a.m. to 7 a.m., leading into Keeping it Real with Will and Willie and was a rundown of local and national news, as well as weather and traffic reports. Shortly after Will and Willie disappeared, Stephanie Miller's morning show arrived to take the 6 a.m. to 9 a.m. slot on KQKE. The remodeled show The Progressive News then moved to 4-6PM, and its content was more focused on the Bay Area, including more interviews and news about Bay Area people and politics, with less repetition of national stories.

"AM 960 The Quake" was not related to KQAK, a San Francisco station that was on the air from 1982 to 1985 that also called itself "The Quake". However, Paul "Lobster" Wells holds the distinction of working for both "Quake" stations, as he served as producer and on-air contributor for KQKE's former morning show.

==== KKGN ====
On August 13, 2007, Clear Channel changed the KQKE call sign to KKGN, with a repositioning as "Green 960" and initially with programming focused on environmental issues.

=== KNEW ===
On January 3, 2012, Clear Channel management changed KKGN to KNEW and shifted to a wider-based talk format. The move was part of a broader restructuring of talk programming in Clear Channel's San Francisco cluster. While still predominantly progressive talk for most of the day, KNEW also carried the decidedly conservative Glenn Beck Program during morning drive as well as The Dave Ramsey Show in middays.

On January 2, 2014, Rush Limbaugh’s daily syndicated program moved from KKSF to KNEW. At this point, KNEW dropped all progressive talk programs, as it flipped to conservative talk and rebranded as "The Patriot".

==== Affiliation with Bloomberg Radio ====
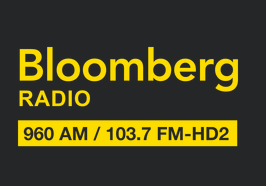
Original "Bloomberg 960" logo, used from 2014 to c. 2017

Later "Bloomberg 960" logo, used until 2024

On September 29, 2014, KNEW dropped conservative talk for business talk programming provided by New York City-based Bloomberg Radio. Limbaugh, Beck, and Hannity's programs were moved to KSFO. On July 30, 2020, KNEW reached an agreement with the Oakland Athletics to broadcast their games for the remainder of the 2020 season, after having initially forgone a radio home in Oakland in favor of streaming only; it would remain the team's flagship station through 2024. The "A's Cast" service, which started the 2020 season on TuneIn and was the originally-intended outlet for A's broadcasts in the Bay Area, moved to iHeartRadio as part of the deal.

==== Sports Talk & More ====
KNEW's ten-year local marketing agreement with Bloomberg L.P. would end without renewal on September 30, 2024; that month, the station began running promos directing listeners to Bloomberg's app to continue hearing Bloomberg Radio programming as of October 1. On September 27, 2024, iHeart announced that upon the end of the Bloomberg LMA, KNEW would flip to a hybrid sports and talk format as "iHeart Sports Talk and More". The station airs the Fox Sports Radio national lineup from 6 a.m. to 7 p.m., and talk programming from Premiere Networks the rest of the day (as KGMZ-FM has the rights to Fox Sports Radio's nighttime programming in the Bay Area market).

Athletics baseball games would remain on KNEW despite the team's 2025 move to Sacramento ahead of their long-term relocation to Las Vegas, as part of a deal that made KSTE—an iHeartMedia-owned station in Sacramento—the team's new flagship station. The "A's Cast" stream on iHeartRadio also continues to air games.
