= KYLD =

Contemporary hit radio station in San Francisco

- San Francisco, California; United States
- Broadcast area: San Francisco Bay Area
- Frequency: 94.9 MHz (HD Radio)
- Branding: WiLD 94.9

Programming
- Language: English
- Format: Contemporary hit radio
- Affiliations: Premiere Networks

Ownership
- Owner: iHeartMedia; (iHM Licenses, LLC)
- Sister stations: KIOI; KISQ; KKSF; KMEL; KNEW; KOSF

History
- First air date: March 12, 1958
- Former call signs: KSFR (1958–1966); KSAN (1966–1997)
- Call sign meaning: a play on "Wild"

Technical information
- Licensing authority: FCC
- Facility ID: 59989
- Class: B
- ERP: 30,000 watts
- HAAT: 369 meters (1,211 ft)
- Transmitter coordinates: 37.689°N 122.437°W
- Repeater: 94.9 KYLD-FM1 (Pleasanton)

Links
- Public license information: Public file; LMS
- Webcast: Listen live (via iHeartRadio)
- Website: wild949.iheart.com

KYLD (94.9 FM) is a commercial radio station in San Francisco, California, serving the San Francisco Bay Area and owned by San Antonio–based iHeartMedia. The station airs a contemporary hit radio format on its analog primary signal. The station has studios located in the SoMa district of San Francisco, and the transmitter is located atop the San Bruno Mountains.

== Other uses of the KSAN call letters ==
The call letters of KSAN have been used by four unrelated radio stations and one related TV station in the San Francisco Bay Area since the late 1950s. In the early 1960s, KSAN 1450 AM became KSOL and programmed R&B music, and was also notable for DJ Sly Stone (Sylvester Stewart), who went on to fame as a musician, fronting the band Sly and the Family Stone.

The KSAN call sign was first used on FM at 94.9 on May 21, 1968, after the former classical music station KSFR was purchased by Metromedia in October 1966.

== History ==
=== Classical years ===
The Federal Communications Commission (FCC) had given a construction permit for KSFR on September 20, 1957, to H. Alan Levitt, who owned a San Francisco record shop. Levitt had previously worked as an engineering assistant and announcer at KLX (910 AM) in Oakland. KSFR was assigned 94.9. Levitt had tried unsuccessfully to get 96.5, but the FCC gave that frequency to the San Francisco Chronicle station KRON-FM, which returned to the air as a non-commercial classical music station in 1957 after being off the air for three years. (KRON-FM had originally broadcast on 96.5 from July 1947 to December 31, 1954).

Known as "The Concert Music Station", KSFR began broadcasting on March 11, 1958. Its first studios were at 217 Kearny Street in San Francisco. The original transmitter on San Bruno Mountain had an effective radiated power of 9,400 watts. Levitt was general manager and a chief announcer, known primarily for hosting "The Wolfgang" (a program devoted to early classical music) and for producing his own distinctive commercials. An early staff announcer was Bill Agee, who later became a featured announcer and music director of "The Classic Stations" KKHI AM and FM, San Francisco, and host of live Friday night San Francisco Symphony Orchestra broadcasts. Announcer Lee Whiting also moved from KSFR to KKHI.

In late 1958, KSFR moved to 10 Claude Lane, a later home of KFRC. In September 1961, KSFR's power was increased to 35,000 watts. On June 1, 1962, KSFR began broadcasting in multiplex stereo; however, Levitt was criticized by media critic Bob Foster in The San Mateo Times for rushing into stereo without conducting field tests because there were some serious technical problems with the signal. These were soon resolved and KSFR became the first San Francisco station to broadcast classical music full-time in stereo. KSFR moved to 211 Sutter Street in 1965.

Levitt sold KSFR to Metromedia in 1966, remaining at 211 Sutter Street. Metromedia, the fourth largest broadcasting company in the nation, after NBC, CBS and ABC, also bought San Francisco station KEWB 910 AM, renamed KNEW, to be similar to its WNEW in New York. It bought KSAN-TV channel 32, acquiring this call sign.

Under the original agreement, Levitt was to stay on as KSFR general manager for five years and the classical music format would be maintained. Metromedia continued the classical music format for a couple of years, producing a special series of programs honoring conductor Arturo Toscanini during the 1967 centennial of his birth. However, in October 1967, Metromedia replaced Levitt as general manager.

=== KSAN (1968–1980) ===
On May 21, 1968, the call letters changed to KSAN and the format switched to freeform music format. Metromedia transferred the KSAN calls from its TV station, which it renamed KNEW-TV. (The KSFR call letters currently belong to a National Public Radio station in Santa Fe, New Mexico.)

The timing of the change from KSFR to KSAN was triggered by an event at another station. On March 18, 1968, KMPX program director Tom Donahue turned in his resignation after a series of conflicts with station management. This led directly to a strike by many Donahue-loyal KMPX staff members. They began picketing outside the station's offices, and were soon supported in their efforts by popular bands such as the Grateful Dead and Blue Cheer, as well as the station's devoted listeners. The staff at sister station KPPC-FM in Pasadena walked out the next day.

KMPX and KPPC owner Leon Crosby refused to cave in to his striking staff, and brought in replacements at both stations to continue the progressive rock format. Several popular rock bands — including The Rolling Stones and the Grateful Dead — insisted that the station not play their music, in a show of support to the picketers. The eight-week strike ended on May 13, with no resolution between the former staffers and Crosby. KMPX continued with the same format, but the controversy opened the eyes of larger broadcasting companies to the potential for rock and roll on FM.

Seeing an opportunity to jump into a hot new radio format against a smaller company, Metromedia decided to switch the format of KSAN from classical music to freeform rock, and hired Donahue and most of the displaced KMPX staffers, who started at the station on May 21. Metromedia also hired the former KPPC staffers to work at KMET in Los Angeles, which made a similar format switch. Donahue eventually became general manager of KSAN, while also programming consulting for sister station KMET.

KSAN, also known as Jive 95, became a groundbreaking and legendary rock station, influencing other stations across the country.

On December 7, 1969, KSAN broadcast a show discussing what had just happened the night before at the free Rolling Stones performance at Altamont Raceway. Hosted by Stefan Ponek, the four-hour show fielded calls from a range of people who attended the event and a few who helped organize it, including Rolling Stones personnel and members of the Hells Angels. This broadcast is extensively documented in the 2000 Criterion DVD release of Gimme Shelter, the result of a restoration effort that included the filmmakers.

In the early 1970s, the station rose to number one in the 18–34 demographic, developing a devoted cult following that lasted for many years. During its heyday, KSAN had maintained a strong counterculture reputation. News reports often contained political commentary, with stories about the Vietnam War, the Nixon Administration, growing marijuana and drugs. When the Symbionese Liberation Army kidnapped heiress Patty Hearst, they used KPFA, a listener sponsored radio station in Berkeley to communicate their message and demands, via cassette tapes. The station enlisted the assistance of the Federal Bureau of Investigation during this ordeal, as they became an unwilling go-between in the Hearst kidnapping.

On April 28, 1975, Tom Donahue died from a heart attack. A sampling of Tom Donahue on KSAN during the late 1960s can be heard on "The Golden Age Of Underground Radio" compilation.

The station started to decline in popularity, with new station KMEL rising in popularity. By 1978, the station adopted a tighter presentation, with a playlist replacing the longtime freeform ethic. They also added more new wave and punk music, such as the Sex Pistols, The Clash and Blondie.

California Historical Radio Society is trying to produce a KSAN documentary of the 1968 to 1980 era.

=== Country era (1980–1997) ===
KSAN's famed rock format ended on November 14, 1980, when the station switched to a country music format, likely influenced by the success of the 1980 movie Urban Cowboy which greatly increased the popularity of country music, as well of sister station KNEW, which had switched to country music in July 1974. Under the country format, KSAN thrived as a ratings leader thanks to Program Director Bob Hamilton, and then Lee Logan, Operations Manager from 1987 to 1994, and Head of Programming/West Coast for Malrite. It was during the Logan years that the KSAN/KNEW combo were consistently a top 3 combo based on Arbitron. With Marlene Augustine leading the marketing and Music Director Richard Ryan, along with air personalities such Frank Terry, Sam Van Zandt, Steve Jordan, Jon Wailin, Tom Benner, Teri King, Dave Ware, Tim Anthony, and Buddy Baron, KNEW/KSAN was a massive force in the market. Later talent included Welch and Woody in the Morning, and Rick Neal.

=== WiLD 94.9 (1997–present) ===
Just before midnight on July 3, 1997, air personality Rick Neal played "The Dance" by Garth Brooks as the last song of the country format on KSAN. At one minute past midnight, KSAN swapped frequencies with KYLD, then on 107.7 FM. The two frequencies simulcasted until midnight on July 7, when 107.7 FM, now with the KSAN call letters, began stunting with construction noises and song clips as a prelude to a flip to classic rock on July 11.

In the wake of the Telecommunications Act of 1996, KYLD was sold that year to Chancellor Media (before merged with Capstar to become AMFM, and later, merged with iHeartMedia's predecessor Clear Channel Communications). The move eliminated the ongoing competition with now-sister station KMEL; KMEL maintained its audience approach and format, while KYLD's Rhythmic format shifted to a pop-heavy Rhythmic direction as the market had no top 40/pop station of its own. KZQZ was the last CHR/top 40 station in The Bay Area, as they dropped the format in 2002 for a classic hits format. Up until February 2015, KYLD was a reporter to Nielsen BDS and Mediabase on their rhythmic panel, but was moved to both trades' top 40/CHR panel.

The top 40 void, however, would finally be filled by two new competitors. In September 2006, KYLD got some competition when KFRC changed their oldies format to a rhythmic AC format. KFRC changed their call letters to KMVQ in May 2007, and by November 2008, shifted to top 40/CHR. By September 2009, KNGY joined the fray by dropping its dance format for top 40/CHR as well, becoming KREV. While KREV has since flipped to AAA, KMVQ has since become a viable competitor.

== Controversy ==
In 1993, a story was circulating that President Bill Clinton tied up traffic on an LAX runway for over an hour while getting a haircut on Air Force One from the hairstylist Cristophe. KYLD's morning DJ Mancow Muller staged a parody of the incident on the San Francisco–Oakland Bay Bridge during rush hour. He used vans to block the westbound lanes on the bridge while his then sidekick, Jesus "Chuy" Gomez, got a haircut. As a result of this stunt, Muller was not only fired from the station, but prosecuted and subsequently convicted of a felony by a San Francisco Municipal Court. His sentence included three years probation, a $500 fine and 100 hours of community service. KYLD eventually paid $1.5 million to settle a lawsuit filed by a bridge commuter.

After Muller's departure, KYLD replaced his program with yet another successful—and yet later, another controversial—morning show, The Dog House, hosted by JV (Jeff Vandergrift) and Elvis (Dan Lay). Their program became the #1 rated morning show in the Bay Area receiving higher ratings than Howard Stern. Despite their success in the ratings, they would find themselves in trouble with station management over a series of stunts that would get them in hot water with the local authorities. One stunt in particular had members of the show dressed up as escaped inmates (and law enforcement officials to fine them for the prank and endangering the public) and causing a walkout at a San Jose high school. The final blow for The Dog House occurred on April 21, 2005, when station management terminated the show after its hosts made offensive remarks about two female members of the San Francisco Renegades Drum and Bugle Corps. The band's members, Lisa Johnson and Robin Kinoshita, were at the station to promote an annual fundraiser when JV and Elvis allegedly made lewd remarks towards them. JV later returned to KYLD as their morning host.

On August 6, 2008, KYLD PD Jazzy Jim Archer and evening host Joe Breezy were fired over an April Fools Day 2008 prank, in which the station promised to give away breast augmentation surgery (referred to as 'a pair of breasts') from "Dr. Sanders". In reality, the reference was a pun, and chicken breasts from KFC were awarded to the contest winner, who was not impressed and filed a complaint against the station.

== Repeater ==
KYLD is rebroadcast on the following FM repeater:

Call sign	Frequency	City of license	FID	ERP (W)	HAAT	Class	FCC info
KYLD-FM1	94.9 FM	Pleasanton, California	59990	186 (Horiz.)	927 m (3,041 ft)	D	LMS
