= KLLC =

Hot adult contemporary radio station in San Francisco

- San Francisco, California; United States
- Broadcast area: San Francisco Bay Area
- Frequency: 97.3 MHz (HD Radio)
- Branding: Alice 97.3

Programming
- Language: English
- Format: Hot adult contemporary
- Subchannels: HD2: Channel Q

Ownership
- Owner: Audacy, Inc.; (Audacy License, LLC)
- Sister stations: KCBS, KFRC-FM, KGMZ-FM, KITS, KRBQ

History
- First air date: September 14, 1947; 78 years ago
- Former call signs: KWBR-FM (1947–1949); KGSF (1949–1952); KXKX (1952–1956); KEAR (1956–1978); KCBS-FM (1978–1982); KRQR (1982–1996)
- Call sign meaning: "Alice"

Technical information
- Licensing authority: FCC
- Facility ID: 9624
- Class: B
- ERP: 82,000 watts horizontal; 95,000 watts vertical
- HAAT: 309 meters (1,014 ft)
- Transmitter coordinates: 37°51′3″N 122°29′51″W
- Repeater: See § FM Booster

Links
- Public license information: Public file; LMS
- Webcast: Listen live (via Audacy)
- Website: www.audacy.com/radioalice

KLLC (97.3 FM, Alice 97.3) is a commercial radio station located in San Francisco, California, and broadcasting to the San Francisco Bay Area, owned by Audacy, Inc. The station's studios and offices are co-located with formerly co-owned KPIX-TV on Battery Street in downtown San Francisco, and its transmitter is off Wolfback Ridge Road on Mount Beacon in the Marin Headlands near Sausalito, California.

== History ==
The 97.3 MHz frequency signed on the air as KWBR-FM, dedicated September 14, 1947. The station was owned by the Warner Brothers of Oakland (of no relation to the film studio), with studios and transmitter on the side of Twin Peaks. It was a sister station of KWBR AM (earlier known as KLS and the current day KMKY 1310 AM. After changing its call letters to KGSF in 1949, the station was sold in 1952 to the Electronic Service Corporation and managed by Stephen Cisler, who also owned KEAR (1550 AM) in San Mateo, and renamed KXKX. The two stations broadcast the same classical music format. In 1956, struggling financially, Cisler sold KEAR but retained KXKX and the KEAR call letters, moving the KEAR call letters to the FM frequency.

Family Radio acquired KEAR in 1959 and aired its Christian religious programming on the frequency for nearly 20 years. On September 13, 1978, Family Radio purchased a much stronger frequency, which saw KEAR and the religious format move to 106.9, as part of a three-way deal that also saw KCBS-FM move from 98.9 MHz to 97.3 MHz. KCBS-FM, known as "97K", programmed a hot adult contemporary format. Over the years, the station evolved in more of a classic hits direction. For a time, 97K aired the syndicated American Top 40, a countdown show starring Casey Kasem.

On January 25, 1982, at midnight, KCBS-FM became KRQR "The Bay Area Rocker", with a hard-edged album-oriented rock (AOR) format, to compete against leading rock station KMEL. The first song played under the KRQR call sign was "I'm a Rocker" by Bruce Springsteen. KRQR's harder approach helped start a long run as a dominant rock station.

1982 was a busy year for Bay Area rock stations. In May of that year, KSFX dropped rock and went to a talk format as KGO-FM. A month later, on August 23, KQAK switched to rock as "The Quake". The following month, KFOG dropped beautiful music for a more eclectic mix of rock. Even with four AOR stations in San Francisco, in addition to two more in San Jose, KRQR still dominated amidst the stiff competition. KQAK was the first to give up, dropping AOR for modern rock in April 1983. KRQR and KFOG then competed with the tightly-formatted KMEL, which flipped to CHR in 1984.

KRQR's rock format continued throughout the 1980s and up to 1993, when it moved to more of a classic rock direction. By 1995, the hard rock format was in decline across the country, as modern rock was on the rise. To combat this, the station evolved back to a more current direction in February 1996. However, this failed to turn around ratings; at 3 p.m. on June 5, 1996, KRQR flipped to KLLC, "Alice 97.3," with a Modern AC format. The flip to "Alice" made the station one of the first in the U.S. to air the format. KLLC gradually evolved into Hot AC by 2010.

On February 2, 2017, CBS Radio announced it would merge with Entercom. The merger was approved on November 9, 2017, and was consummated on November 17.

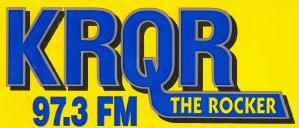
KRQR logo - mid 1980s

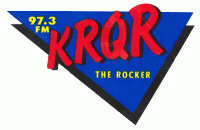
KRQR logo - early 1990s

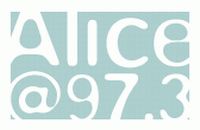
KLLC logo - early 2010s

== Sarah and Vinnie ==
The station's most popular show has been in weekday morning drive. Originally known as "The Sarah and Vinnie Show", it was hosted by Sarah Clark (also known as Sarah Emily Lyman) and Vinnie Hasson (then known as Vinnie Crackhorn), until he was fired in 2002 due to problems with alcohol. After a several month search for a replacement for Vinnie, the station selected Mike Nelson (also known as "The DJ with No Name," to become the co-host of the renamed "Sarah and No-Name Show." After 6 years, Nelson was let go by station management on July 17, 2008, who announced that Vinnie would re-team with Sarah starting on August 4, 2008, returning the show's name to "The Sarah and Vinnie Show." Nelson later returned to his previous station, Live 105, as the host of the morning show before becoming a part of KFOG's morning show in 2015.

== Booster ==
KLLC is rebroadcast on the following FM Booster:

Call sign	Frequency	City of license	FID	ERP (W)	HAAT	Class	FCC info
KLLC-FM2	97.3 FM	Pleasanton, California	178408	4,800 (Vert.)	−55 m (−180 ft)	D	LMS

== HD Radio ==
KLLC broadcasts in the HD Radio format. Its HD2 subchannel originally carried an automated chill music format, known as "Chill with Alice." According to the radio industry website RadioStats.Net, KLLC has the most-visited site of its kind in the United States.

On October 11, 2018, KLLC-HD2 switched to Radio.com's LGBTQ talk and EDM dance music format, branded as "Out Now." On November 1, 2018, the station rebranded as "Channel Q".

== Off-air activities ==
The station sponsors three seasonal concerts each year: the free "Summerthing" show in June and the "Now and Zen Fest" in September, both in Golden Gate Park, and "Alice in Winterland" in December. Featured acts have included Alanis Morissette, Duran Duran, Five for Fighting, Smash Mouth, and Train. Up until 2009 recordings from the concerts and other live appearances on the station were collected into the annual "This is Alice Music" CD, which was sold to raise funds donated to Breast cancer research and treatment charities.

=== Summerthing lineups ===
- 2015, Kelly Clarkson, Mat Kearney, and Elle King.
- 2014, MAGIC!, Ingrid Michaelson, and Us The Duo.
- 2013, Sara Bareilles, and Ginny Blackmore.
- 2012, Adam Lambert, Scars on 45, Rebecca Ferguson, and Graffiti6.
- 2011, OneRepublic, Matt Nathanson, Parachute, Andrew Allen and Michelle Branch.
- 2010, Lifehouse, Kris Allen, Thriving Ivory.
- 2009, Matt Nathanson, Parachute, Gavin Rossdale.
- 2008, Lifehouse, Marié Digby, Secondhand Serenade.
- 2007, Smash Mouth, Everclear, Mat Kearney.
- 2006, Cake, O.A.R.
- 2005, Hootie & the Blowfish, Jem, Better Than Ezra.
- 2004, Smash Mouth, Berlin, Gavin DeGraw.
- 2003, Luce, Macy Gray.

=== Now and Zen Fest lineups ===
- 2014, Neon Trees, Matt Nathanson, American Authors, and Lindsey Stirling.
- 2013, OneRepublic, Goo Goo Dolls, Plain White T's, Walk Off the Earth, and Larkin Poe.
- 2012, Alanis Morissette, Matt Nathanson, Ed Sheeran, Phillip Phillips, Tristan Prettyman, and Hedley.
- 2011, Goo Goo Dolls, Michelle Branch, and Eoin Harrington.
- 2010, Sara Bareilles, Plain White T's, Natasha Bedingfield, Five for Fighting, and Ryan Star.
- 2009, Train, Colbie Caillat, Howie Day, and Dashboard Confessional.
- 2008, Sara Bareilles, Gavin DeGraw, Sugar Ray, Duffy, and Lenka.
- 2007, James Blunt, Joss Stone, and Gin Blossoms.
- 2006, The B-52's, Blue October, Augustana, Gnarls Barkley, Carbon Leaf.
- 2005, Maroon 5, Duran Duran, Josh Kelley, Natasha Bedingfield.
- 2004, Howie Day, Dashboard Confessional, Tears for Fears.
- 2003, Duran Duran, Liz Phair, Seal, Maroon 5
- 2002, Train, India.Arie The Wallflowers, Aimee Mann
- 2001, Alanis Morissette, Macy Gray, Melissa Etheridge
- 2000, Dogstar, Tonic, Travis, The Go-Go's and Beck.
- 1999, Jewel, Cake, Old 97's, Fleming & John.
- 1998, The Wallflowers, Smash Mouth, Des'ree, Anggun, Sixpence None the Richer.

=== Alice in Winterland / Alice @97.3 Green Christmas Hosted by Sarah and Vinnie lineups ===
- 2022, Doors, Lizzy McAlpine, Matt Nathanson, Kelsea Ballerini, John Mayer, and OneRepublic.
- 2019, Kesha, Avril Lavigne, and Flora Cash.
- 2018, Michael Franti & Spearhead, OneRepublic, and Leon Bridges.
- 2017, John Mayer, Matt Nathanson, and Maren Morris.
- 2016, OneRepublic, Train, and The Last Bandoleros.
- 2015, Zella Day, Michael Franti, Harry Connick, Jr. and James Bay,
- 2014, Ed Sheeran, Train, & Christina Perri.
- 2013, Michael Franti & Spearhead, Gavin DeGraw, and Delta Rae.
- 2012, Of Monsters and Men, Hedley, and Andy Grammer.
- 2011, Kid Rock, and Christina Perri.
- 2010, Train, Michael Franti, and Christina Perri.
- 2009, Ingrid Michaelson, Uncle Kracker, and Diane Birch.
- 2008, Marc Roberge, Richard On, Alanis Morissette, Sara Bareilles, Ingrid Michaelson, Buckcherry, Lenka, and Justin Nozuka.
- 2007, The Kooks, Colbie Caillat.
- 2006, Scissor Sisters, Soul Asylum.
- 2005, Eoin Harrington, Switchfoot, Alanis Morissette.
- 2004, Joss Stone, Jem, Los Lonely Boys, Rachael Yamagata.
- 2003, Howie Day, Pete Yorn, Counting Crows, Guster.
- 2002, Coldplay, Frou Frou.
- 2001, Matt Nathanson, Jewel.
- 2000, Nelly Furtado, Everclear, Fastball.
- 1999, Barenaked Ladies, Dido, Joan Osborne.

=== Alice's Mad Hatter Birthday Bash! ===
- 2009, Hoobastank, Smash Mouth, Plain White T's.

== See also ==
- KALC, Alice 105.9, Denver, Colorado
- KLCA, Alice @ 96.5, Tahoe City, California
