= KMKY (AM) =

South Asian radio station in Oakland, California

- Oakland, California; United States
- Broadcast area: San Francisco Bay Area
- Frequency: 1310 kHz

Programming
- Format: South Asian

Ownership
- Owner: Charanjit Batth; (Radio Punjab AM 1310 Inc.)

History
- First air date: 1922; 104 years ago
- Former call signs: KLS (1922–1945); KWBR (1945–1959); KDIA (1959–1984); KFYI (1984–1985); KDIA (1985–1997)
- Former frequencies: 833 kHz (1922-1927); 1220 kHz (1927-1928); 1440 kHz (1928-1937); 1280 kHz (1937-1941)
- Call sign meaning: Mickey Mouse (from the former Radio Disney format)

Technical information
- Licensing authority: FCC
- Facility ID: 96
- Class: B
- Power: 5,000 watts
- Transmitter coordinates: 37°49′26.7″N 122°19′13.9″W
- Translator: 92.9 K225CK (Union City)

Links
- Public license information: Public file; LMS
- Webcast: Listen live
- Website: radiopunjabusa.com

KMKY (1310 AM) is a radio station licensed to Oakland, California, that broadcasts with 5,000 watts. It calls itself "Radio Punjab" and airs programming in Hindi and Punjabi aimed at the San Francisco Bay Area's South Asian community. It is owned by Charanjit Batth, through licensee Radio Punjab AM 1310 Inc. Its transmitter is located in Oakland near the toll plaza for the San Francisco–Oakland Bay Bridge.

The 1310 AM frequency from 1959 to 1997, was the home of urban adult contemporary and gospel music station KDIA. It later served as the San Francisco home of Radio Disney from 1997 to 2015, using the call sign KMKY, the last three letters standing for the Disney character Mickey Mouse.

== History ==
KMKY is the second-oldest surviving radio station in the Bay Area. It was first licensed, with the randomly assigned call letters of KLS, on March 10, 1922, on 833 kHz. It moved to 1220 kHz in 1927, then 1440 kHz in 1928. It moved to 1280 kHz in 1937, then 1310 kHz in 1941, as a result of the NARBA agreement. In 1945, when the station was still owned by the Warner Brothers of Oakland, no relation to the movie studio, it changed its call letters to KWBR and changed its format to focus on an African-American audience. In 1959, it was bought by the owners of Memphis radio station WDIA, and the call letters were changed to KDIA. During the 1960s through the 1980s, the station was the premier soul and funk station in the San Francisco Bay Area. Sly Stone was a DJ at the station before launching Sly and the Family Stone.

In December 1984, the station was sold to Adam Clayton Powell III, who turned the station into KFYI, with an all-news radio format backed by a 32-member news team. After Powell failed to make payroll for KFYI – having lost a reported $4-million in funding invested by Aetna Insurance in less than six months on the air – the station went silent on April 9, 1985. It returned to air in July, however, having reclaimed its legacy KDIA call letters, while resuming its urban music format.

In the early 1990s, KDIA was co-owned by then mayor of Oakland, Elihu Harris, with then California Assembly Speaker Willie Brown. In 1992, Oakland journalist Chauncey Bailey returned to the Bay Area to work as public affairs director and newscaster on KDIA. Bailey later became the editor of the Oakland Post who was murdered on the streets of downtown Oakland. KDIA changed from gospel music to Radio Disney on December 15, 1997, when the station was sold by Jim Gabbert to The Walt Disney Company.

On August 13, 2014, Disney put KMKY and 22 other Radio Disney stations up for sale, to focus on digital distribution of the Radio Disney network.

On June 24, 2015, RD San Francisco Assets filed an application to sell KMKY to Radio Mirchi, for $600,000. The sale was completed on October 6. Radio Disney programming for the region later moved to the KLLC HD3 digital subchannel, where it aired until June 2018.

== See also ==
- List of initial AM-band station grants in the United States
