= KKSF =

Black Information Network radio station in San Francisco

- Oakland, California; United States
- Broadcast area: San Francisco Bay Area
- Frequency: 910 kHz
- Branding: The Bay Area’s BIN 910

Programming
- Format: Black-oriented news
- Affiliations: Black Information Network

Ownership
- Owner: iHeartMedia; (iHM Licenses, LLC)
- Sister stations: KIOI, KISQ, KMEL, KNEW, KOSF, KYLD

History
- First air date: July 25, 1922
- Former call signs: KLX (1922–1959); KEWB (1959–1966); KNEW (1966–2012)
- Call sign meaning: San Francisco

Technical information
- Licensing authority: FCC
- Facility ID: 59966
- Class: B
- Power: 20,000 watts (day); 5,000 watts (night)
- Transmitter coordinates: 37°53′44.7″N 122°19′28.9″W

Links
- Public license information: Public file; LMS
- Webcast: Listen live (via iHeartRadio)
- Website: bayarea.binnews.com

KKSF (910 kHz) is a commercial AM radio station licensed to Oakland, California and serving the San Francisco Bay Area. The station is owned by iHeartMedia and has an all-news radio format, with programming from the co-owned Black Information Network (BIN). The studios are located on Townsend Street in San Francisco's SoMa district.

The station's transmitter and two-tower array are located on Point Isabel in Richmond, on the San Francisco Bay. KDIA utilizes one of KKSF's two towers during the day. KKSF transmits with 20,000 watts during the day and 5,000 watts at night, using a directional antenna at all times. Because radio waves travel farther at night, KKSF must reduce its power after sunset to protect other stations on AM 910 from interference.

== History ==
=== KLX ===
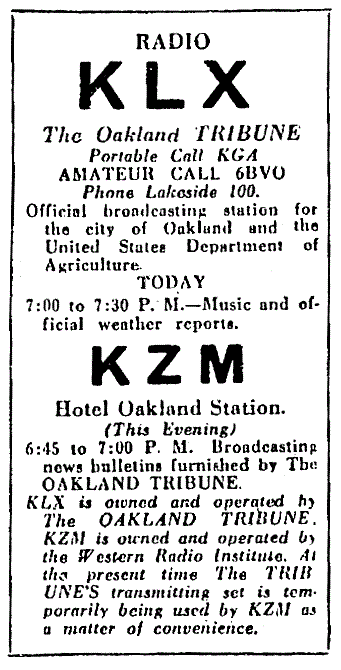
From its debut in 1922 until November 1923, KLX shared facilities at the Oakland Hotel with Preston D. Allen's KZM.

KKSF was founded by the Oakland Tribune newspaper. Starting in early 1922, the Tribune supplied content for Preston D. Allen's station, KZM, located on top of the Oakland Hotel. Following a suggestion by Allen, the newspaper decided to establish its own broadcasting station, and on May 3, 1922, it was issued a license for a new station with the randomly assigned call letters KLX. This authorization specified operation on the standard "entertainment" wavelength of 360 meters (833 kilocycles). KLX's first sign-on occurred at 7:30 p.m. on July 25, 1922.

For the first year and a half, KLX shared the studios and transmitter at the Oakland Hotel with KZM. Engineer Roswell Smith remembered that "they used to shut down the transmitter as KZM, and take to the air a half hour later as KLX". As part of the cooperative effort, the Herald arranged to upgrade the KLX's 5-watt transmitter by installing two more powerful transmitters, which were named for characters in the Toonerville Folks comic strip: 50-watt "Little Jimmie", and 250-watt "Powerful Katrinka."

Initially, the 360-meter wavelength was the only "entertainment" frequency available, so stations within various regions had to develop time sharing agreements providing for each station to broadcast for a few hours each week. By November 1, 1922, there were twelve "San Francisco Bay District" stations sharing time on 360 meters, and, after KZM ceded its original hours, KLX was assigned 7:00–7:30 p.m. daily except Sunday, plus 10:00–11:00 a.m. Sunday and 8:00–9:00 p.m. Tuesday.

In the fall of 1923, KLX moved to its own studio on the 20th floor of the recently completed Tribune Tower at Thirteenth and Franklin, where it would stay there for thirty years. An antenna was strung between the tops of the Tribune and Oakland Bank buildings, and the transmitter was upgraded to 500 watts.

The station later moved to 590 kHz. The transmitter power was increased to 1,000 watts by the 1930s, with the station moving to 880 kHz. With the implementation of the North American Regional Broadcasting Agreement (NARBA) in 1941, KLX moved to its current frequency of 910 kHz. In 1952, the transmitter was moved to the San Francisco Bay shoreline and increased to 5,000 watts. In late 1956, KLX moved to the Bermuda Building on Franklin Street.

KLX was owned for three decades by Joseph R. Knowland, owner and publisher of The Oakland Tribune newspaper. To pay off campaign debts related to U.S. Senator William Knowland's unsuccessful 1958 campaign for Governor of California, the Knowland family sold the station to the former publisher of Collier's magazine (which had ceased publication in December 1956).

=== Top 40 KEWB ===
KLX became KEWB on June 7, 1959. KEWB was owned by Crowell Collier Broadcasting until 1966. KEWB switched to Top 40 hits, pitting it against existing San Francisco Top 40 stations KYA and KOBY. KYA outlasted KEWB, while KOBY couldn't keep up and eventually changed call letters to KKHI, as "The HIGH Spot on Your Radio Dial", playing middle of the road music. It later switched to classical music.

Guided by programmer Chuck Blore, KEWB began the same on-air approach implemented at Los Angeles sister station KFWB, and adopted the slogan "Color Radio - Channel 91". KEWB played the current best-selling hits, added amusing format elements, and employed energetic, funny disc jockeys. Chris Borden's weekend show was a "pool party," complete with sound effects: Casey Kasem dropped in wild tracks, Gary Owens delivered a stream of one-liners, Bobby Dale was frantic, and Ron Lyons was acerbic. It proved to be a winning combination.

During the early 1960s, KEWB was famous for its on-air slogan "Boss Radio", using the then-current slang for "cool". The station was considered the launching pad for the radio careers of Casey Kasem, "The Real" Don Steele, and Robert W. Morgan. Gary Owens did a humorous morning show at KEWB, which he eventually moved it to KFWB, and in the 1960s was featured as the "announcer" on TV's Rowan & Martin's Laugh-In.

Casey Kasem did the evening show using the moniker "Casey at the Mike," after the famous baseball poem "Casey at the Bat". He had been using wild tracks between records, but the General Manager told him to stop. Without that gimmick, he looked around the station for inspiration. Finding the 1962 edition of 'Who's Who in Popular Music' in a waste basket, he conceived of relating music trivia to the audience between the songs, which led eight years later to the development of the successful "American Top 40" show format upon which he built his later career. A decade later, KNEW was the show's Bay Area network affiliate, so Casey was again heard on "Channel 91".

Morgan went by his last name while working the morning drive time at KEWB. Steele worked the afternoon drive. Both had short stays, both joining Bill Drake's new "Boss Radio" at KHJ, Los Angeles. Drake's conversion of San Francisco's KFRC to the same format brought an end to KEWB's Top 40 era.

Other notable KEWB personalities included Don McKinnon, Buck Herring, "Honest" John Trotter, Art Nelson, Bobby Dale, Perry Roberts, Chris Borden, Jim Wayne, Michael Jackson, and Ken Knox. KEWB DJs Ron Lyons and Ron Reynolds returned during the KNEW years.

=== Talk KNEW ===
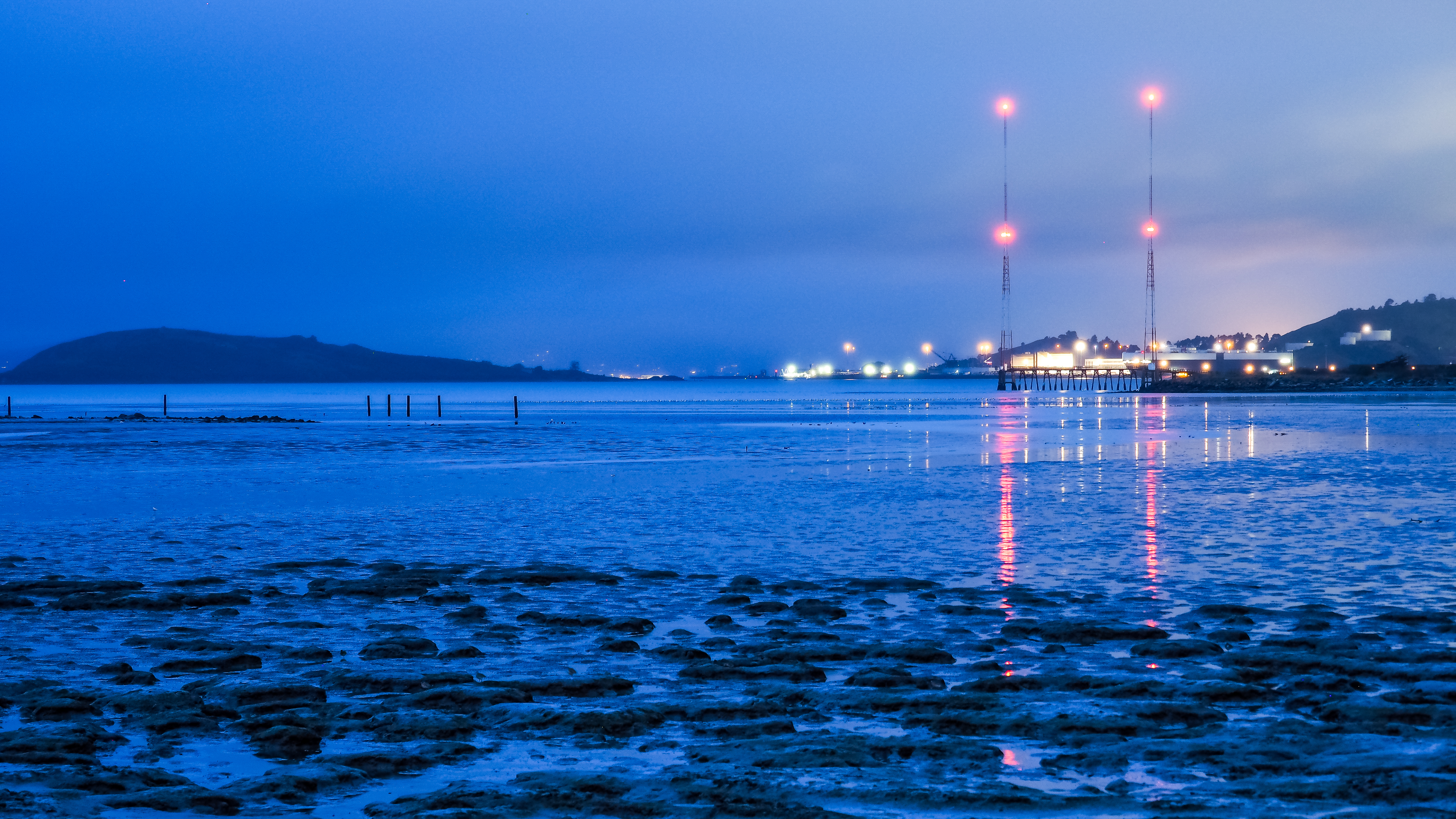
The twin tower array of KKSF

In 1966, the station was purchased by Metromedia Broadcasting, which changed the station's call sign to KNEW, purchased from a Spokane station for $75,000. Metromedia wanted to match its New York station's call letters WNEW. Starting with an all-night talk show hosted by Joe Dolan, Metromedia ended the Top 40 music format and switched to controversy-focused talk radio, based in elaborate new waterfront studios at 66 Jack London Square in the Port of Oakland Building. The studio featured extensive space for tours of some of Metromedia owner John Kluge's art collection (also displayed at KTTV in Los Angeles).

However, KNEW found it couldn't compete against ABC Radio's long-established news-talk station KGO. In 1969, Metromedia switched to playing adult standards, with personality DJs. The station continued to struggle, as they were now competing against market powerhouse KSFO.

=== Oldies Channel 91 ===
In 1971, general manager Ken Gaines was transferred to KNEW from Metromedia's Cleveland station WHK. Gaines and new program director John L. Hawkins quickly evolved KNEW to a fast-paced format of adult contemporary and oldies music hosted by humorous DJs. Hawkins restored the nickname "Channel 91" and on-air elements echoing its earlier days as Top 40 rocker KEWB. KNEW recorded new station jingles using the original KEWB melody.

The KNEW staff featured several KEWB veterans including Ron Lyons and Ron Reynolds, board operator Carl "The Caterpillar" Dahlstrom (a nickname given him by Gary Owens), and Casey Kasem's former board operator Jim Tharp. Newcomers to the air team included Bill Collins from WHK, and "Tall" Tom Campbell from KYA and KLOK. Program director John Hawkins did shows on weekends. Other KNEW air personalities during this period include Hal Pickens, Bob Raleigh, Harry Stephens (Osibin), and Eddie Alexander.

In 1971, Bill Ballance’s “Feminine Forum” radio show was launched on KGBS in Los Angeles. The provocative show became a top rated show. In 1972, KNEW general manager Ken Gaines and program director John Hawkins devised a "relationships" talk show that candidly focused on issues important to, and only accepted calls from, women. Hawkins named the show "California Girls" and created a special edit of the Beach Boys song as the theme. They launched the idea as a variation on a Sunday morning public affairs show already hosted by Don Chamberlain, a part-time/weekend KNEW newscaster. Word spread rapidly that KNEW had "sex talk" on the radio, and the show was soon moved to weekdays 9AM - Noon where it became a popular and talked about feature. San Francisco Chronicle columnist Herb Caen wrote that he walked the entire length of Market Street listening to California Girls, and he didn't miss a word -— yet he didn't have a radio. The station was on in all the stores. Later, KNEW added evening show "California Guys" just for men, hosted by Dee Merritt. Hawkins extended the branding to the "greatest hits" music format, calling it "California Gold".

During the years 1966-1977, KNEW was considered one of the Bay Area's top news stations, known for its aggressive field reporting. Led by News Director Gil Haar (Eugene Gelhaar), the veteran news team included Knowles Robertson, Ron Baker, Barney Lee (continuing from the KEWB days) and Mike Forrest.

=== Country music ===
Though "Channel 91" was quite popular, the early 1970s recession and oil crisis made it difficult to get sufficient advertising to support the large operation. Eventually, Metromedia decided it could make more money by adopting a simpler, less-competitive country music format that was working for sister station KLAC in Los Angeles.

In July 1974, KNEW's format changed to "California Country" music, led by new general manager Bill Ward, who was also GM of KLAC. Gaines, Hawkins, Lyons, Reynolds, Campbell, and others left the station. Bill Collins remained with KNEW as a country music DJ, working the mid-day shift. Other airstaff members included morning man Frank Terry and music director Steve Leader in the afternoon slot.

In the 1990s, the format became classic country. In September 1997, the station changed from local DJs to the satellite-fed "Real Country" syndicated network. In August 1998, the station dropped country to simulcast co-owned KIOI, an adult contemporary station.

=== Return to talk ===
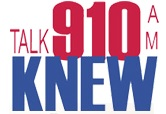
"Talk 910 KNEW" logo from 2003 to 2010.

KNEW became the flagship over-the-air affiliate of CNET Radio on January 14, 2000, offering technology news and talk 24 hours a day. Under that format, the station simulcasted nationally on XM Satellite Radio channel 130. Also in 2000, the station was acquired by Clear Channel Communications, the forerunner to current owner iHeartMedia.

In 2003, the station dropped CNET and became a general talk radio station branded "Talk 910." Programming included Sacramento-based Armstrong & Getty in mornings, The Glenn Beck Program, and nationally syndicated The Savage Nation with Michael Savage, for which KNEW was the flagship station beginning in July 2003.

On September 10, 2009, KNEW dropped "The Savage Nation" and replaced it with John and Ken from co-owned Los Angeles station KFI. The station explained its decision: "We have decided to go in a different philosophical and ideological direction, featuring more contemporary content and more local information."

Clear Channel rebranded KNEW to "Fox Newsradio 910" on July 6, 2010, with the slogan "The Bay Area's Home of Fox News Radio." Accompanying that change, Fox News Radio's John Gibson replaced John and Ken in afternoon drive. Later in 2010, 910 began carrying "The Dave Ramsey Show" and "The Alan Colmes Show".

=== KKSF NewsTalk 910 ===
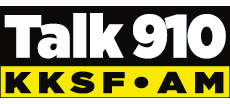
"Talk 910" logo from 2012 to 2016; an earlier variant of this logo used "NewsTalk".

As part of a far-reaching programming realignment, KNEW obtained the rights to "The Rush Limbaugh Show," previously on KSFO. KNEW was rebranded as KKSF "NewsTalk 910," effective January 3, 2012. The KKSF call sign was last used at 103.7 on the FM dial, best known as a Smooth Jazz station on that frequency. The Sacramento-based Armstrong & Getty program remained in the morning commute period, while Len Tillem and Gil Gross replaced John Gibson in the afternoon. Gene Burns' "Dining Around" program got a spot on Saturday. Bill Wattenburg's syndicated show got a spot on Sunday nights. Tillem, Gross, Burns, and Wattenburg became available when KGO terminated many talk show hosts as part of a shift to a news and information format. KKSF also picked up the syndicated Tom Sullivan show during middays. Tillem and Burns were the only local hosts on the station. Len Tillem left the station at the end of March 2013, and Gene Burns died at the end of May 2013. Rush Limbaugh's daily syndicated program moved from KKSF to AM 960 (which was now using the KNEW call letters), and later returned to KSFO.

=== ESPN Deportes ===
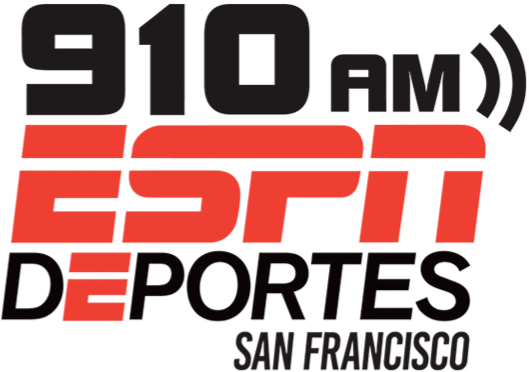
Logo as an ESPN Deportes affiliate

On July 22 2016, KKSF dropped its talk format and switched to Spanish-language sports using the ESPN Deportes Radio Network. Initially, the station was programmed by Deportes Media under a local marketing agreement (LMA). (Deportes Media had previously operated previous ESPN Deportes Radio affiliate 860 KTRB.) By November 2016, iHeartMedia resumed operating KKSF in-house, retaining ESPN Deportes programming for several more months.

=== Progressive talk ===
Logo as "Real Talk 910"

On June 11, 2018, KKSF switched to progressive talk, branded as "Real Talk 910." The progressive talk format had previously been heard on KNEW (960 AM) until that station switched to business news as an affiliate of Bloomberg Radio.

KKSF's progressive talk programming on weekdays included Stephanie Miller, Thom Hartmann, Randi Rhodes, Rick Unger, and Clark Howard. Rev. Jesse Jackson also hosted a weekend show. For world and national news, the station picked up NBC News Radio, which is run by parent company iHeartMedia.

=== Black Information Network ===
On June 29, 2020, fifteen iHeart stations in markets with large African American populations, including KKSF, began stunting with African American speeches, interspersed with messages such as "Our Voices Will Be Heard" and "Our side of the story is about to be told," with a new format slated to launch on June 30. That day, KKSF, along with the other fourteen stations, became the launch stations for the Black Information Network, an African American-oriented all-news network. This change positioned the station in competition with Entercom (now Audacy)’s heritage all-news stations KCBS/KFRC-FM.

== See also ==
- List of initial AM-band station grants in the United States
