= James Gabbert =

American radio personality

James Gabbert (born 1936 in Chico, California) is a radio and television engineer and entrepreneur, California Broadcasters Association 1994 Broadcaster of the Year, and past president of the National Radio Broadcasters Association.

He has owned and managed San Francisco Bay Area television station KOFY-TV and radio stations KIOI and KSOL, and Honolulu stations KIKI and KPIG-FM.

Gabbert lives in Sausalito.

== Education ==
Gabbert studied electrical engineering at Stanford University.

== Career ==
=== Radio ===
While in school in 1957, Gabbert founded KPEN-FM in Atherton. and in 1968 changed its call sign to KIOI ("K-101").

Gabbert moved K101 to San Francisco and purchased KSAY (1010 AM), changing its call letters to KIQI.

James Gabbert partnered with 'silent partners' to form "FM Broadcasting". In 1979, FM Broadcasting acquired Honolulu stations KIKI and KPIG-FM.

In 1986 Hispanic station KOFY 1050 AM was acquired by FM Broadcasting and merged in the same building with their television station now re-christened KOFY-TV "because people remember radio stations by call letters and TV stations by their channel number".

=== Television ===
FM Broadcasting sold their four radio stations, and bought KEMO-TV (Channel 20) in San Francisco, changing its call sign to KTZO in October 1980. In 1986, KTZO became KOFY-TV.

In 1994 Gabbert was approached by Warner Brothers and asked to be the Bay Area affiliate for the new WB Television Network.

=== Beyond Broadcasting ===
In 1998, Gabbert and partners "FM Broadcasting" got out of broadcasting and sold KOFY-TV and their last two radio stations, KOFY 1050 AM and KDIA 1310 AM. Gabbert then formed "Next Century Enterprises" to handle yacht rentals in Sausalito, just across the Golden Gate Bridge north of San Francisco.

=== Retirement ===
In 2005 James Gabbert started to miss broadcasting. First he hosted a radio show then he went back on KOFY-TV 20 to guest host the afternoon programs. This confused some viewers into thinking Gabbert had bought back the TV station, but he was just doing it for fun. He didn't even request any payment.

== Additional sources ==
- Vane, Edwin T. (January 1994). Programming for TV, Radio, and Cable. Focal Press. pp. 87–89. ISBN 9780240801285.
