= KMEL =

Urban contemporary radio station in San Francisco

Coordinates: 37.690°N 122.438°W

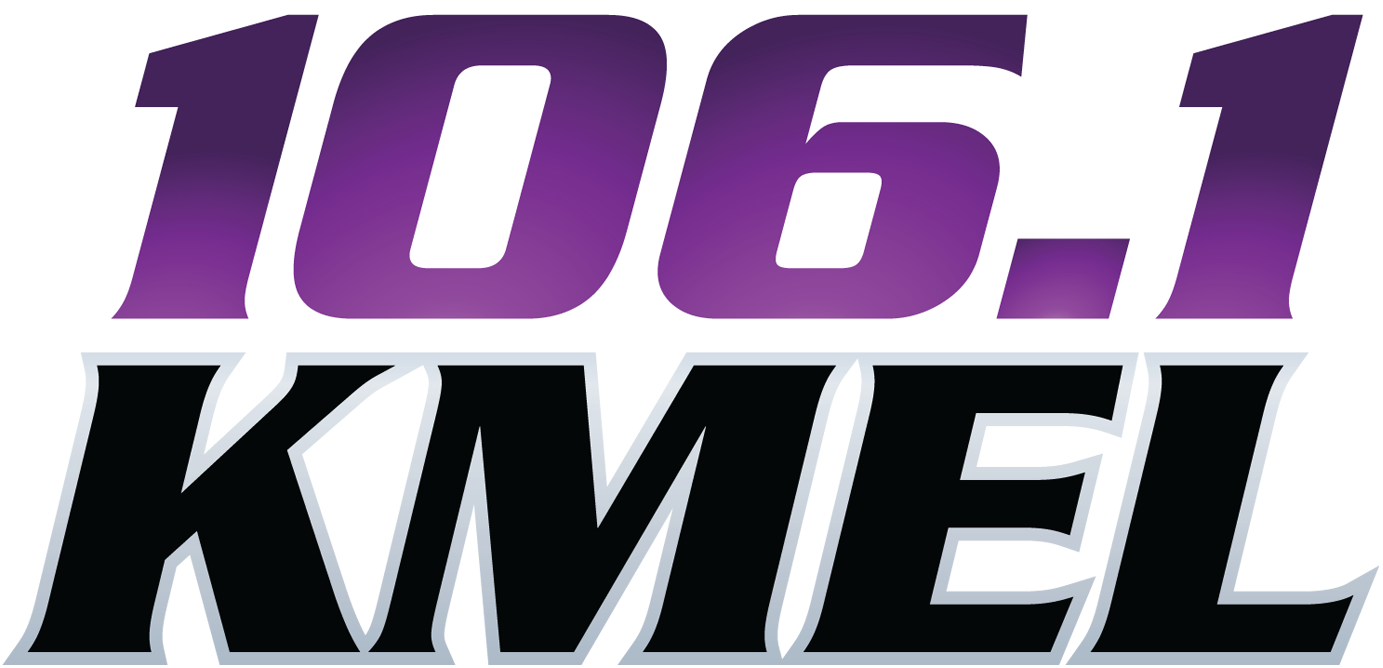
- San Francisco, California; United States
- Broadcast area: San Francisco Bay Area
- Frequency: 106.1 MHz (HD Radio)
- Branding: 106 KMEL (pronounced "One Oh Six, K-M-E-L")

Programming
- Format: Urban contemporary

Ownership
- Owner: iHeartMedia; (iHM Licenses, LLC)
- Sister stations: KIOI, KISQ, KKSF, KNEW, KOSF, KYLD

History
- First air date: November 30, 1960
- Former call signs: KFRC-FM (1960–1968); KFMS (1968–1972); KKEE (1972–1973); KFRC-FM (1973–1977)
- Call sign meaning: "Camel" (sic), name of former branding and mascot

Technical information
- Licensing authority: FCC
- Facility ID: 35121
- Class: B
- ERP: 69,000 watts horizontal; 100,000 watts vertical
- HAAT: 393 meters (1,289 ft)
- Repeater: See § FM booster

Links
- Public license information: Public file; LMS
- Webcast: Listen live (via iHeartRadio)
- Website: kmel.iheart.com

KMEL (106.1 FM) is an urban contemporary radio station that is licensed to San Francisco, California, serving the San Francisco Bay Area. It is owned and operated by iHeartMedia.

KMEL has studios located in the SoMa district, and broadcasts a "superpower" Class B signal of 69,000 watts from a transmitter atop the San Bruno Mountains south of San Francisco. The station's powerful signal is heard all over the Bay Area and covers areas as far north as Santa Rosa and as far south as the Santa Cruz Mountains. It is currently one of the highest-rated stations in the San Francisco Bay Area, with the largest listening audience in the males 18-to-34 year-old demographic.

== History ==
=== 1940s–1977 ===
106.1 FM began as KGO-FM, sister station of KGO. The FM station was originally licensed at 96.9 FM in 1946. KGO-FM moved to 106.1 FM on November 3, 1947, with facilities at a former General Electric plant on East 12th Street in Oakland. On January 14, 1955, KGO-FM moved from 106.1 to 103.7 and today is KOSF.

On May 7, 1958, RKO General, owner of Top 40 powerhouse KFRC 610 AM, was granted authority to construct a new station at 106.1 FM and on July 20, 1961, it became officially licensed with the call letters KFRC-FM. The station's call letters changed to KFMS in November 1968, then KKEE in October 1972. In September 1973, the KFRC-FM call letters were reinstated, and the station began a "nostalgia rock" format, playing oldies and soft rock as "K106".

=== As KMEL ===
==== AOR era (1977–1984) ====
On July 2, 1977, after Century Broadcasting purchased the FM station, KFRC-FM changed call letters to KMEL, and flipped to album-oriented rock ("AOR"). Psychedelic poster artist Victor Moscoso created the station's mascot: a camel wearing headphones. The station used the KMEL call letters to name itself "Camel 106".

KMEL was a top-rated station in 1980, with a tightly formatted approach, and along with newer rival KSFX, helped force legendary rival KSAN to switch to country music. That same year, KMEL signed popular New York radio personality and San Francisco native Alex Bennett. Bennett anchored the morning position which was followed by well-liked veteran Tony Kilbert covering mid-day, music director Paul Vincent covering the afternoon, then Mary Holloway and Michael St. John in the evening. The station played mostly cuts from about 30 top rock albums, interspersed with a few lesser known songs such as on the "Fresh Kamel Trax" feature highlighting new albums at noon and at 8 p.m. With news reporter/sidekick Joe Regelski, Bennett built a large following over the next two years, becoming known as a "benignly nasty" morning DJ, "the guy everybody loves to hate", according to Promotion Director Ken Wardell.

In 1982, there were many changes at Bay Area rock stations. In January 1982, KMEL obtained a new rival when KCBS-FM transformed itself from an adult contemporary-format station into rock-formatted KRQR. In May 1982, AOR competitor KSFX dropped rock and went to a talk format as KGO-FM. Bennett and Regelski left KMEL in June after the station hired Sebastian, Casey & Associates as programming consultants to increase ratings. Bennett said that programming consultants were "the single most cancerous force in our industry." In August, Bennett and Regelski went to work at KQAK. KMEL lost market share to its competition—KQAK, KRQR, KOME and KSJO. In September 1982, KFOG entered the battle for rock-listener market share after dropping its beautiful music format in favor of an eclectic mix of rock. With so many album rock stations in the Bay Area, KMEL faced stiff competition.

==== Top 40/CHR era (1984–1987) ====
Despite KQAK switching away from its album rock format in April 1983, changing to modern rock, the Bay Area AOR scene was still highly competitive. KMEL finally dropped the album rock format at noon on August 25, 1984. After playing "Caribbean Queen" by Billy Ocean, followed by the national anthem performed by Huey Lewis and the News, KMEL flipped to a mainstream CHR format designed by new program director Nick Bazoo, brought in for the purpose from WEZB in New Orleans. The first song under the new format was "Wanna Be Startin' Somethin'" by Michael Jackson. Bazoo took on the young Keith Naftaly as music coordinator. Bazoo was credited with breaking the song "One Night in Bangkok" in May 1985. Bazoo left KMEL for Los Angeles in June 1985, and Steve Rivers was hired from Tampa to take his place as program director. Naftaly continued underneath Rivers. Despite the format switch, the KMEL callsign was retained as a holdover to this day. KMEL was also an affiliate of The Rockin' America Top 30 Countdown with Scott Shannon.

Naftaly created a new slogan for KMEL, "The People's Station", reflecting its community outreach programs and prime-time public affairs shows. Jeff Chang credits KMEL's reputation as "the people's station" for its location "blessed with one of the strongest campus and community radio networks in the country." Two on-air personalities hired in this era came from local college radio stations: Davey D from UC Berkeley's KALX and Kevvy Kev from Stanford's KZSU.

In March 1985, KMEL hired John London and Ron Engelman to host a morning zoo program. Mark McKay covered the mid-day slot, while Howard Hoffman took the afternoon drive time shift, Sonny Joe Fox covered evenings, Licia Torres hosted nights, and Mark Todd carried the overnight shift. Weekends were anchored by Sue Hall and Ty Bell. During the football season in late 1985, 49ers tight end Russ Francis joined the morning zoo by phone and sometimes in person to comment on sports. Promoting her song "Slave to the Rhythm", Grace Jones visited the morning zoo in 1986, meeting Hall, London, and Engelman. The success of "The All New, All Hit 106 KMEL" eventually helped push main CHR rival KITS toward a modern rock format as "Live 105", while AM rival KFRC abandoned its CHR format in August 1986 for adult standards as "Magic 61". The station's branding as "106 KMEL" remained in place for many years.

Steve Rivers left KMEL to work at KIIS-FM in Los Angeles, so Lee Michaels was hired as program director. When Michaels left, Keith Naftaly had been recognized as the Music Director of the Year by the Gavin Report, and this helped him rise at the age of 24 to the position of program director in June 1987. Under Naftaly's guidance, KMEL gravitated its format direction from pop top 40 to rhythmic by adding more urban artists and increasing its popularity with younger audiences. Rock and most pop titles were eliminated in the process.

==== Rhythmic-turned-urban era (1987–present) ====
In late 1986, KMEL wanted to explore the mix show format, which Naftaly and Michaels put into place Powermixers DJ Dave Moss and DJ Alex Mejia as interns on a new Saturday night show called "Club 106." In early 1987, KMEL hired popular club DJ Cameron Paul away from rival KSOL because of his sizable following. Paul remixed Salt-N-Pepa's "Push It", which had been a B-side song, and this remix was played first on KMEL. The song became so popular that it gave Salt-N-Pepa their first mainstream crossover hit. Paul was in demand as a remixer. This ability of remixing and redrumming the records became very popular among all of KMEL's "Powermixers". KMEL had obtained even more talent from the DJ community, now bringing on Michael Erickson, Theo Mizuhara and Billy Vidal. The station also hired new music director Hosh Gurelli from Boston. KMEL became known as one of the most innovative stations because of its music selection and the type of programming it was doing, plus the air personalities' focus on the community. KMEL re-invented once again by putting Cameron Paul on five nights a week, then doing a live broadcast from San Francisco venue "City Nights". Personalities during this time included John London, Renel Lewis and Brian Cooley on "The Morning Zoo", middays with Leslie Stoval, afternoon drive with Rick Chase, and nights with Evan Luck.

As the 1980s gave way to the 1990s, KMEL became one of the first crossover pop stations in the nation to target young multiracial audiences with not-yet-mainstream hip-hop, dance, freestyle, house, and reggae music. KMEL was the first pop station in the U.S. to play "Wild Thing" by Tone-Loc and "Bust a Move" by Young MC and first of any radio station in the country to play "U Can't Touch This" by Oakland rapper MC Hammer and "Ice Ice Baby" by Vanilla Ice. Bay Area artists Too Short and Digital Underground also got early airtime on KMEL.

By September 1992, Century Broadcasting sold KMEL to Evergreen Media. The new owners guided KMEL into its current urban contemporary format, effectively shedding its Top 40 direction for good and refocused now as an R&B station with a strong emphasis on hip-hop. The station was alternately known as KMEL Jams in the mid-1990s. The present-day format has made the station less synonymous with the previous short lived formats and became more recognized in the Bay Area's African American community all the while targeting a wider audience to date, thus giving it heritage status through the KMEL call letters. Evergreen patterned the diversity of the station after its then-sister station KKBT in Los Angeles by maintaining a multi-racial staff to ensure KMEL had "No Color Lines" under the new phase of the format.

Also in 1992, KSOL, which ironically suffered in ratings due to KMEL's newfound success, retooled itself as KYLD "Wild 107.7" (now "Wild 94.9") and quickly emerged as KMEL's prime competitor for their mutual core audience demographic. In response, KMEL introduced new music shows The Wake-Up Show hosted by Sway Calloway and King Tech, and Street Knowledge hosted by Davey D, in addition to the public affairs program Street Soldiers hosted by Joseph E. Marshall. The fierce competition over the coveted 18- to 34-year-old "urban" listening audience continued for another four years until the passage of the Telecommunications Act of 1996 increased the number of radio stations that a company could own. Evergreen Media ended the ratings war with KYLD by purchasing it later that year. Jeff Chang blames the Telecommunications Act for reducing the amount of community-based programming and causing playlists to become more generic on urban stations nationwide. Meanwhile, a third competitor, KHQT out of San Jose, was also in competition with the two stations until 1995, when it changed formats under new ownership.

In the 1990s, KMEL's DJ Alex Mejia put together a show called "Westside Radio" which featured Ice Cube's West Side Connection. Frequent guest DJs were also rappers, including Ice-T, Ice Cube, Kid Frost, LA Dream Team, Snoop Dogg, and Rodney-O & Joe Cooley.

Chancellor Media (later AMFM Inc.) eventually purchased Evergreen Media (along with KMEL and KYLD), and AMFM was then swallowed up by Clear Channel Communications via a $24 billion deal in 1999. Controversially, KMEL canceled its Sunday night Street Soldiers public affairs program, but later reinstated the show.

On October 1, 2001, radio personality and hip-hop activist David "Davey D" Cook was terminated, due to what the station said were consistently low ratings. His dismissal occurred after new program director Michael Martin took charge of the station, and happened at the same time as the station changed many programming elements, as well as coinciding with the layoffs of several other station personnel, including on-air personalities Trace-Dog Nunez, Rosary Bides, and Franzen Wong. Cook, however, claims his departure was due to his political views, including his having aired statements from California Congresswoman Barbara Lee and rapper Boots of The Coup voicing opposition to the War in Afghanistan.

On August 15, 2013, KMEL fired longtime morning host Jesus "Chuy" Gomez after 20 years.

== Current format and programming ==
The majority of KMEL's playlist features music under the rubric of the Urban Contemporary format, heavy on hip-hop and R&B. KMEL also competes with Urban adult contemporary ("Urban AC") formatted KBLX-FM (now owned by Connoisseur Media). KMEL reports as rhythmic contemporary per Mediabase, even though they're not a rhythmic contemporary station (another urban station on the rhythmic panel of Mediabase and urban panel of Nielsen BDS was WJHM in Orlando, Florida, until morphing to rhythmic and was moved over to BDS' Rhythmic panel in February 2012. Another station, WPGC-FM in Washington, D.C., would follow suit in July 2012). Per Nielsen BDS reports, they are urban contemporary, KBFB in Dallas/Fort Worth are rhythmic contemporary stations per Mediabase reports, but they report on the BDS urban panel despite being the only rhythmics in those areas where there are existing urban contemporary stations (WKYS/WERQ-FM and KKDA-FM). KMEL, as of 2012, is one of the last remaining urban contemporary stations on the Mediabase rhythmic panel.

KMEL suffered a setback in ratings between 2009 and 2010. This was mainly due in part to Arbitron phasing out the diary-keeping approach to ratings for the PPMs. This contributed to the brief decline of KMEL's ratings since the station has a specific audience target. While some longtime urban contemporary stations in other major cities (like WPGC-FM in Washington, D.C., and KPRS in Kansas City) introduced songs typical of what is played on rhythmic radio stations to boost ratings, KMEL programming executives decided not to revert to its rhythmic/urban roots; it remained urban.

In addition to its typical daytime mixture of hip hop and R&B, KMEL plays R&B and soul slow jams from roughly 10:00 pm to 1:00 am Monday through Thursday. The 10:00pm hour of that shift is known as The Ten O'Clock Booty Call, with the remaining two hours devoted solely to slow jam love songs dubbed as The KMEL Lounge. Urban contemporary gospel airs on Sunday mornings. KMEL is one of two area stations to play gospel; KBLX is the other. It even plays Old School hip hop and soul during the midday mix show "The Twelve O'Clock Throwback Mix", "Funky Fridays" on Friday mornings, and mixed in general during their weekend playlist rotation.

In line with its slogan, "The People's Station", KMEL broadcasts the community-affairs show Street Soldiers, hosted by Dr. Joseph E. Marshall, on Sunday evenings.

=== Alumni ===
By introducing their music, KMEL established many artists' careers in the late 1980s and 1990s, including Mariah Carey, En Vogue, Tupac Shakur, Digital Underground, DJ Jazzy Jeff & the Fresh Prince, MC Hammer, Queen Latifah, MC Lyte, Timex Social Club, Tony! Toni! Toné!, Bell Biv Devoe, Boyz II Men, Jodeci, E-40, the Coup, Too Short, Club Nouveau and Mac Dre.

Many popular Bay Area and national media personalities either got their start or spent time working at KMEL, including Alex Bennett, Howard Hoffman (aka Howard "The Refrigerator" Hoffman), Rick Chase, the Baka Boyz, Renel Brooks-Moon and J. Paul Emerson.

=== Promoting hyphy ===
The station has played a significant role in the promotion of hyphy music in the San Francisco Bay Area by playing tunes from many of the local artists associated with hyphy. KMEL's mixshows have long contained exclusive hyphy music which can seldom be heard over the airwaves elsewhere in the country. Because the station broadcasts live via streaming audio from their website, it gives the genre a platform for possible worldwide exposure.

== FM booster ==
KMEL is rebroadcast on the following FM Booster:

Call sign	Frequency	City of license	FID	ERP (W)	HAAT	Class	FCC info	Notes
KMEL-FM2	106.1 FM	Walnut Creek, California	136936	.1 (Horiz.); 6,500 (Vert.)	158 m (518 ft)	D	LMS	(HD Radio)
