= KFRC-FM =

All-news radio station in San Francisco

Simulcast of KCBS, San Francisco
- San Francisco, California; United States
- Broadcast area: San Francisco Bay Area
- Frequency: 106.9 MHz (HD Radio)
- Branding: All News 106.9 and AM 740 KCBS

Programming
- Format: All-news radio
- Affiliations: ABC News Radio; Bloomberg Radio; KPIX-TV

Ownership
- Owner: Audacy, Inc.; (Audacy License, LLC)
- Sister stations: KCBS, KGMZ-FM, KITS, KLLC, KRBQ

History
- First air date: September 10, 1959
- Former call signs: KPUP (1959–1960); KHIP (1960–1962); KMPX (1962–1978); KEAR (1978–2005); KIFR (2005–2007)
- Call sign meaning: sequentially assigned for KFRC (610 AM), now KEAR

Technical information
- Licensing authority: FCC
- Facility ID: 20897
- Class: B
- ERP: 80,000 watts
- HAAT: 305 meters (1,001 ft)
- Transmitter coordinates: 37.851°N 122.498°W
- Repeater: See § FM Booster

Links
- Public license information: Public file; LMS
- Webcast: Listen live (via Audacy)
- Website: www.audacy.com/kcbsradio

KFRC-FM (106.9 MHz) is a commercial radio station in San Francisco, California, serving the San Francisco Bay Area. It currently simulcasts sister station KCBS, which carries an all-news format. The station transmits its signal from Mount Beacon atop the Marin Headlands above Sausalito, California, while studios were shared with formerly co-owned CBS O&O station KPIX-TV in downtown San Francisco.

== HD programming ==
- HD1 is a digital simulcast of the 106.9 FM analog signal.
- HD2 was a Classic hits format, which was previously carried as the only signal on standard analog FM. It was turned off in early 2023, as part of a company-wide cost cutting measure.

== History ==
=== Early years ===
On December 10, 1959, the station, owned by San Francisco businessman and future San Francisco/Golden State Warriors owner Franklin Mieuli, signed on at 106.9 MHz with the KPUP call letters. It was one of two Bay Area stations to sign on that day: three hours later, KWME in Walnut Creek began broadcasting. In July 1960, the call letters were changed to KHIP, and the station aired jazz music programming.

Mieuli sold KHIP on July 1, 1962, to Leon Crosby, who had previously owned KHYD in Hayward. Under Crosby's ownership, the station began operating in multiplex stereo, and the call letters were changed to KMPX, for "multiplex", the following month. Soon after, Crosby gained authorization by the Federal Communications Commission (FCC) to increase the station's power from the original 37,000 watts to 80,000 watts.

By mid-1964, KMPX was airing a middle of the road music format. As the money-strapped station struggled, the schedule became dominated by various brokered foreign language programs by 1966.

=== The birth of freeform rock radio ===
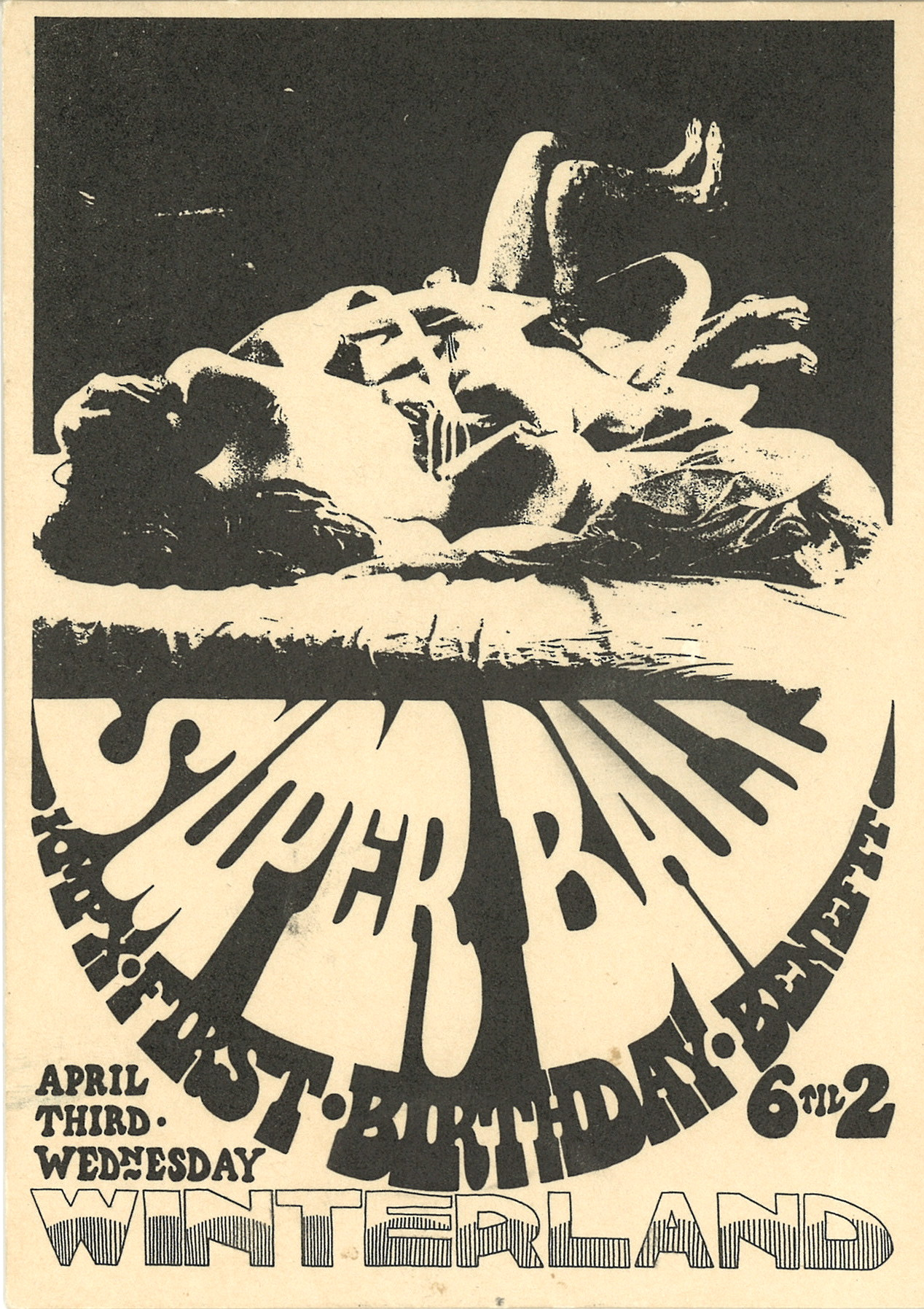
First anniversary of freeform rock at Winterland Arena, held in 1968

Though KMPX's daytime schedule was heavy with ethnic programming, the midnight-6 AM slot was open. On February 12, 1967, on-air personality Larry Miller was given the shift, where he played his preferred folk rock music programming. The popularity of what Larry Miller was doing caught on very rapidly and soon the daytime foreign language programming gave way to more rock music programming, due to the efforts of newly hired Tom Donahue. The rock music format expanded to full-time on August 6, 1967, as the last of the foreign-language program contracts expired.

The presentation of music on the station stood in stark contrast to most other stations of the day. Instead of a hit music-dominated playlist, KMPX played more album cuts, local, emerging and cutting-edge artists, and a wide mix of genres such as rock, blues, jazz and folk music. Some of the music played in the spring of 1967 included Jefferson Airplane's album Surrealistic Pillow, the first Grateful Dead album, Jimi Hendrix's Are You Experienced and The Beatles' Sgt Pepper's Lonely Hearts Club Band, which KMPX played uninterrupted in its entirety. Among the DJs were Howard Hesseman, who used his experiences to inspire his later performance as Dr. Johnny Fever on WKRP in Cincinnati.

In November 1967, Donahue was hired to bring the progressive rock to KMPX's sister station in Southern California, KPPC-FM. The difficulties of managing two stations and friction between Donahue and Crosby led to Donahue's resignation, followed by a strike by the loyal Donahue-led KMPX and KPPC staff on March 18, 1968, principally over the DJs wanting more freedom over the songs played on the stations. The DJs organized as the Amalgamated Federation of International FM Workers of the World, operating out of a ferry boat. Crosby hired replacements, negotiations broke down, and the former KMPX and KPPC staffers were eventually hired by Metromedia at their stations KSAN in San Francisco and KMET in Los Angeles, both adopting the freeform progressive album-oriented rock format pioneered at KMPX and KPPC.

In 1969, KMPX and KPPC-AM-FM were sold by the Crosby-Pacific Broadcasting Company to National Science Network, Inc. in a $1.2 million transaction. They continued with the freeform format, though it was tweaked over the next several years. Crosby eventually purchased a local television station, KEMO, channel 20.

=== Big-band flip and station swap ===
In June 1972, KMPX dropped rock and switched to a big band/nostalgia format.

When broadcast businessman/pharmaceutical advertiser Ludwig Wolfgang Frohlich, the owner of National Science Network died, his estate explored various opportunities to sell the station. In 1973, a sale to KMPX, Inc.—a subsidiary of the Burbank Broadcasting Company, which bought KPPC-FM—failed. A 1975 offer from film director Francis Ford Coppola to purchase KMPX for $870,000 was not consummated because of problems at one of Coppola's other businesses.

The company finally found a buyer in 1976, when Family Radio, owner of KEAR (97.3 FM), struck a deal to purchase the station for $1 million. In accordance with FCC ownership guidelines at the time, Family Radio sold their station at 97.3 to CBS Inc. for $2 million, and CBS in turn sold their lower-powered station at 98.9 MHz to a Black-owned local company, Golden Gate Radio, for $850,000. The sale, though, caused controversy among a group of dedicated KMPX listeners, organized as the KMPX Listeners Guild. Their objections, backed by petitions signed by more than 20,000 listeners, held up the sale at the FCC and ended in a 1978 settlement where Golden Gate would take over the KMPX call letters and format on its own station. Golden Gate also would operate from the former KMPX studios. The three-way switch occurred September 13, 1978, with 106.9 becoming the new location of KEAR's religious format.

=== KEAR (1978–2005) ===
From October 4, 1978, to October 17, 2005, 106.9 served as Family Radio's flagship Christian radio station. KEAR's programming was also syndicated to the company's other radio outlets across the country.

CBS entered the picture once again in April 2005, when parent company Viacom struck a deal with Family Radio to trade their strong-signaled AM facility, KFRC (610 AM), for the 106.9 MHz facility. Until CBS was able to install their own programming on 106.9 FM, KEAR simulcast on both frequencies. The Oakland Athletics baseball team had a contract with KFRC to carry its games; therefore, Family Radio carried the games on 610 AM until the end of the team's 2005 season. After the baseball broadcasts concluded in October 2005, 610 AM dropped the KFRC call sign and became KEAR, while 106.9 FM became KIFR, with a new format to follow after a period of stunting.

=== Free FM ===
Logo for 106.9 Free FM

On October 25, 2005, the Free FM talk radio format was launched, as the station began carrying the Tom Leykis and John and Jeff shows. In addition, KIFR added locally based talk shows from The Dog House, John London, Darien O'Toole, Turi Ryder, Johnny Wendell and Scott and Casey.

When CBS' post-Howard Stern morning show strategy began in January 2006, KIFR picked up the new The Adam Carolla Show from Adam Carolla.

Weekday evenings, then middays were hosted by Chris Daniel and Brad Giese, who came together on air as the topical call-in show The Gray Area. Documentary filmmaker and San Francisco socialite Emily Morse hosted Sex With Emily, a show that started as a podcast, late Saturday nights.

"On The Couch with Drew and Marcus" was a weekend show on Free FM. It was a college show at San Francisco State and became a weekend staple for Free FM. All the shows can be found online at www.drewandmarcus.com.

"Gamer!" was a one-hour weekend radio show that aired on Saturday mornings on KIFR that highlighted the world of video gaming. Hosted by Karlenea B and Keith Williams, they had interviews with video game makers, players, and other people of interest to the video gaming world.

On August 1, 2006, Opie and Anthony started airing on the station on a tape delay basis from 10 AM-1 PM.

KIFR and the Free FM format included a strong online emphasis via the 106.9 Free FM website. Podcasting, online streaming, and interactive features provides a bridge between the traditional talk radio format and the "on-demand" features of developing new media.

On October 30, 2006, CBS Radio and the Oakland Athletics agreed to a three-year contract to broadcast Oakland Athletics baseball games, 162 regular season games and 15 spring training games, and all playoff games. The contract lasted through 2009 and noted 106.9 as the "official radio home of the Oakland A's."

=== Revival of KFRC ===
On May 17, 2007, following that day's game between the Oakland A's and the Kansas City Royals, CBS Radio moved the KFRC call letters from 99.7 FM to 106.9 FM, and changed 106.9 FM's format to classic hits. At the time of 610 KFRC's sale to Family Radio, 99.7 FM and 610 AM had been simulcasting a similar format, also under the KFRC call letters. 106.9 FM's format change served as a revival of this format. Local management announced that some of the Free FM shows and hosts, such as Carolla, Leykis, and Opie and Anthony, would move to KYCY 1550 AM. 99.7 FM would receive the new call letters KMVQ. (KYCY would subsequently be replaced on January 1, 2009, with a version of KFRC affiliated with The True Oldies Channel, which was itself discontinued on August 31, 2011, in favor of Indian programming as KZDG.)

=== Simulcast of KCBS ===
On October 27, 2008, at 7:40 a.m., after playing "Don't Stop Believin'" by Journey, and a 6 1/2-minute montage of famous events and songs from the 20th century, CBS Radio replaced KFRC's Classic Hits format with a simulcast of its all news AM station, KCBS. KFRC continued to broadcast classic hits on KFRC-FM HD2. The station's calls were not converted to KCBS-FM, because its Los Angeles sister adult hits station on 93.1 holds those calls, and Nielsen Audio's Portable People Meter ratings system does not require call letter verification by panelists. Additionally, CBS Radio opted to keep control of the historic callsign rather than risk having another Bay Area station take them and trade on their nine-decade heritage in the area. KFRC's existence is only acknowledged in form of hourly legal IDs as "KCBS-AM, KFRC-FM and HD1, San Francisco, Oakland, San Jose" at :59 past the hour.

On February 2, 2017, CBS Radio announced it would merge with Entercom. KFRC-FM, along with KCBS, KITS, KLLC and KZDG were retained by Entercom, while KMVQ was placed in a divestiture trust (along with Entercom's KOIT, KBLX and KUFX) in preparation of a sale to a permanent owner. The merger was approved on November 9, 2017, and was consummated on November 17.

== Booster ==
KFRC-FM is rebroadcast on the following FM Booster:

Call sign	Frequency	City of license	FID	ERP (W)	HAAT	Class	FCC info
KFRC-FM1	106.9 FM	Pleasanton, California	178412	4,800 (Vert.)	−55 m (−180 ft)	D	LMS
