= List of San Francisco 49ers broadcasters =

The 49ers' flagship radio stations are Cumulus Media's KSAN 107.7 FM ("The Bone") in San Jose, while KNBR/FM 680 AM/104.5 FM, and KTCT 1050 AM serve as the San Francisco/Oakland flagships. KSAN airs all 49ers games on FM. On AM, they are simulcasted on KTCT when the San Francisco Giants are playing, and on KNBR when the Giants are not playing. Joe Starkey, best known as the voice of the University of California and The Play, was previously the color commentator on the broadcasts next to legendary announcer Lon Simmons in 1987 and 1988 and took over as lead commentator in 1989. Lon Simmons and Gordy Soltau did the broadcasts on KSFO in the 1949s and 1960s. For a brief period in the late 1970s and early 1980s Don Klein, "the voice of Stanford", did the 49ers' games. Starkey first teamed with former Detroit Lions' and KPIX Sports Director, Wayne Walker and then former 49ers' linebacker Gary Plummer formed the broadcast team from 1998 to 2008, with Starkey retiring after the 2008 season. Ted Robinson replaced Starkey and teamed up with Plummer for the 2009 and 2010 seasons. Plummer was relieved of his color commentating duties for the 2011 season and replaced by former teammate Eric Davis. Tim Ryan replaced Davis in 2014. Greg Papa, the longtime voice of the then-Bay Area rival Oakland Raiders, replaced Robinson on play-by-play in 2019.

Pre-season games not shown on national television are shown on CBS owned-and-operated station KPIX-TV (channel 5) and in surrounding areas via the “KPIX Sports Network”, along with some Sunday Afternoon games and Netflix’s Christmas Game or NFL Network exclusives if the 49ers play. during the regular season. Most regular season games on Sunday afternoons and Prime Video’s Thursday Night Football games featuring the 49ers are televised on Fox owned-and-operated station KTVU (channel 2). KGO-TV (channel 7) owned-and-operated station of ABC airs "Monday Night Football" telecasts (including games only on ESPN or ESPN+.) NBC owned-and-operated station KNTV (channel 11) airs Sunday Night Football broadcasts and games featuring the 49ers streaming exclusively on Peacock or YouTube.

== Radio announcers ==
Source: San Francisco 49ers Football on the Radio (1946–2008) – Bay Area Radio Museum & Hall of Fame.

| Year | Flagship station | Play-by-play | Color commentator |
|---|---|---|---|
| 2020 | KNBR, KSAN, KGO | Greg Papa | Tim Ryan |
| 2019 | KNBR, KSAN, KGO | Greg Papa | Tim Ryan |
| 2018 | KNBR, KSAN, KGO | Ted Robinson | Tim Ryan |
| 2017 | KNBR, KSAN, KGO | Ted Robinson | Tim Ryan |
| 2016 | KNBR, KSAN, KGO | Ted Robinson | Tim Ryan |
| 2015 | KNBR, KSAN, KGO | Ted Robinson | Tim Ryan, Rod Brooks (sideline reporter) |
| 2014 | KNBR, KSAN, KGO | Ted Robinson | Tim Ryan, Rod Brooks (sideline reporter) |
| 2013 | KNBR, KSAN, KGO | Ted Robinson | Eric Davis, Rod Brooks (sideline reporter) |
| 2012 | KNBR, KSAN, KGO | Ted Robinson | Eric Davis, Rod Brooks (sideline reporter) |
| 2011 | KNBR, KSAN | Ted Robinson | Eric Davis, Rod Brooks (sideline reporter) |
| 2010 | KNBR, KSAN | Ted Robinson | Gary Plummer, Rod Brooks (sideline reporter) |
| 2009 | KNBR, KSAN | Ted Robinson | Gary Plummer, Rod Brooks (sideline reporter) |
| 2008 | KNBR, KSAN | Joe Starkey | Gary Plummer, Rod Brooks (sideline reporter) |
| 2007 | KNBR, KSAN | Joe Starkey | Gary Plummer, Rod Brooks (sideline reporter) |
| 2006 | KNBR, KSAN | Joe Starkey | Gary Plummer, Rod Brooks (sideline reporter) |
| 2005 | KNBR, KSAN | Joe Starkey | Gary Plummer, John Shrader (sideline reporter) |
| 2004 | KGO | Joe Starkey | Gary Plummer |
| 2003 | KGO | Joe Starkey | Gary Plummer |
| 2002 | KGO | Joe Starkey | Gary Plummer |
| 2001 | KGO | Joe Starkey | Gary Plummer, Rich Walcoff (home sideline reporter) |
| 2000 | KGO | Joe Starkey | Gary Plummer, Rich Walcoff (home sideline reporter) |
| 1999 | KGO | Joe Starkey | Gary Plummer, Rich Walcoff (home sideline reporter) |
| 1998 | KGO | Joe Starkey | Gary Plummer, Rich Walcoff (home sideline reporter) |
| 1997 | KGO | Joe Starkey | Wayne Walker, Rich Walcoff (home sideline reporter) |
| 1996 | KGO | Joe Starkey | Wayne Walker, Rich Walcoff (home sideline reporter) |
| 1995 | KGO | Joe Starkey | Wayne Walker, Rich Walcoff (home sideline reporter) |
| 1994 | KGO | Joe Starkey | Wayne Walker, Rich Walcoff (home sideline reporter) |
| 1993 | KGO | Joe Starkey | Wayne Walker, Rich Walcoff (home sideline reporter) |
| 1992 | KGO | Joe Starkey | Wayne Walker, Rich Walcoff (home sideline reporter) |
| 1991 | KGO | Joe Starkey | Wayne Walker |
| 1990 | KGO | Joe Starkey | Wayne Walker |
| 1989 | KGO | Joe Starkey | Wayne Walker |
| 1988 | KGO | Lon Simmons (games 1–5, 8–16), Joe Starkey (games 6–7) | Wayne Walker, Joe Starkey (sideline reporter, games 1–5, 8–16) |
| 1987 | KGO | Lon Simmons | Wayne Walker, Joe Starkey (sideline reporter) |
| 1986 | KCBS | Don Klein | Don Heinrich |
| 1985 | KCBS | Don Klein | Don Heinrich |
| 1984 | KCBS | Don Klein | Don Heinrich, Ted Robinson (sideline reporter) |
| 1983 | KCBS | Don Klein | Don Heinrich, Ted Robinson (sideline reporter) |
| 1982 | KCBS | Don Klein | Don Heinrich |
| 1981 | KCBS | Don Klein | Wayne Walker |
| 1980 | KSFO | Lon Simmons | Wayne Walker |
| 1979 | KSFO | Lon Simmons | Wayne Walker |
| 1978 | KSFO | Lon Simmons | Gene Nelson |
| 1977 | KSFO | Lon Simmons | |
| 1976 | KSFO | Lon Simmons | Gordy Soltau |
| 1975 | KSFO | Lon Simmons | Gordy Soltau |
| 1974 | KSFO | Lon Simmons | Gordy Soltau |
| 1973 | KSFO | Lon Simmons | Gordy Soltau |
| 1972 | KSFO | Lon Simmons | Hugh McElhenny |
| 1971 | KSFO | Lon Simmons | Hugh McElhenny |
| 1970 | KSFO | Lon Simmons | Hugh McElhenny |
| 1969 | KSFO | Lon Simmons | Russ Hodges, Hugh McElhenny |
| 1968 | KSFO | Lon Simmons | Russ Hodges, Hugh McElhenny |
| 1967 | KSFO | Lon Simmons | Russ Hodges, Hugh McElhenny |
| 1966 | KSFO | Lon Simmons | Russ Hodges, Hugh McElhenny |
| 1965 | KSFO | Lon Simmons | Russ Hodges, Jim Lange |
| 1964 | KSFO | Lon Simmons | Russ Hodges |
| 1963 | KSFO | Lon Simmons | Russ Hodges |
| 1962 | KSFO | Lon Simmons | Russ Hodges |
| 1961 | KSFO | Lon Simmons | Gordy Soltau |
| 1960 | KSFO | Lon Simmons, Bob Fouts | |
| 1959 | KSFO | Bob Fouts | Lon Simmons |
| 1958 | KSFO | Bob Fouts | Lon Simmons |
| 1957 | KSFO | Bob Fouts | Lon Simmons |
| 1956 | KFRC | Roy Storey | |
| 1955 | KFRC | Roy Storey, Bob Fouts | |
| 1954 | KFRC | Fred Hessler | Frankie Albert |
| 1953 | KYA | Bud Foster | Roy Storey (studio host) |
| 1952 | KYA | Bud Foster | Bob Fouts |
| 1951 | KYA | Bud Foster | Bob Fouts |
| 1950 | KSAN | Rod Hughes | Tommy Greenough, Jack Drees |
| 1949 | KSAN, KSBR | Bud Foster | Gerry Conlee |
| 1948 | KYA | Bud Foster | Gerry Conlee, Bob Fouts (studio host) |
| 1947 | KYA | Bud Foster | Bob Fouts |
| 1946 | KYA | Bud Foster | Bob Fouts |

== Radio network ==
=== California ===
| City | Call Sign | Frequency |
|---|---|---|
| Chico | KTHU-FM | 100.7 FM |
| Eureka | KATA-AM | 1340 AM |
| Fresno | KFIG-AM | 1430 AM |
| Grass Valley | KNCO-AM | 830 AM |
| King City | KRKC-AM | 1490 AM |
| Los Angeles | KABC | 790 AM |
| Mendocino | KUNK | 96.7 FM |
| Modesto | KESP-AM | 970 AM |
| Paso Robles | KPRL-AM | 1230 AM |
| Sacramento | KHTK | 1140 AM |
| Salinas | KION-AM | 1460 AM |
| San Francisco | KNBR (AM); KNBR-FM | 680 AM; 104.5 FM |
| San Francisco | KSFO-AM | 810 AM |
| San Francisco | KSAN-FM | 107.7 FM |
| San Luis Obispo | KKJL-AM | 1400 AM |
| Susanville | KJDX-FM | 93.3 FM |

=== Hawaii ===
| City | Call Sign | Frequency |
|---|---|---|
| Hilo | KPUA-AM | 670 AM |
| Honolulu | KHKA-AM | 1500 AM |
| Maui | KAOI-AM | 1110 AM |

=== Nevada ===
| City | Call Sign | Frequency |
|---|---|---|
| Reno | KPLY | 630 AM |

=== Oregon ===
| City | Call Sign | Frequency |
|---|---|---|
| Brookings | KURY-FM | 95.3 FM |
| Klamath Falls | KAGO-AM | 1150 AM |
| Medford | KBOY-FM | 95.7 FM |
| Portland | KUIK-AM | 1360 AM |

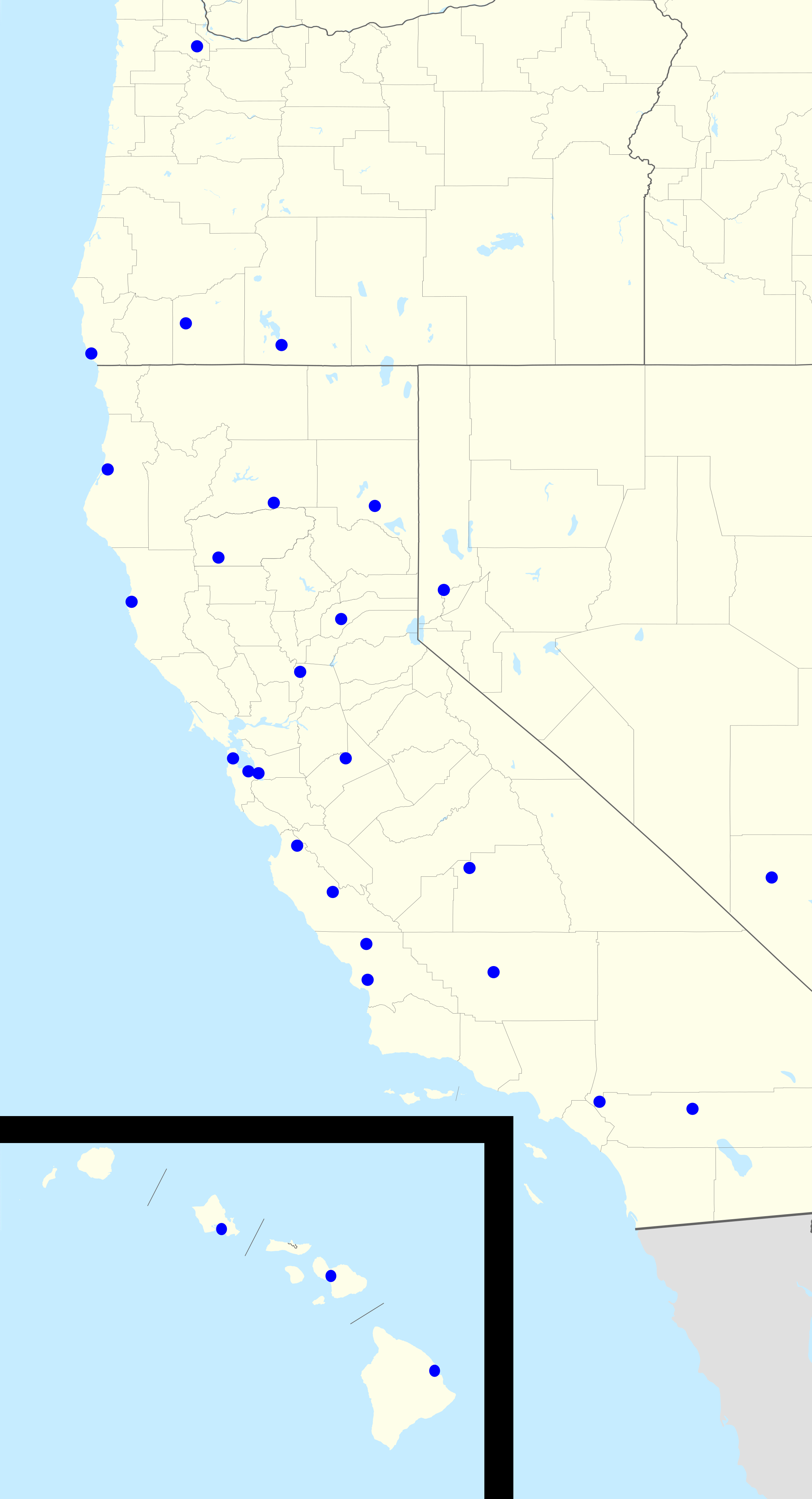
Map of radio affiliates.
