= Damon Bruce =

American sports radio host

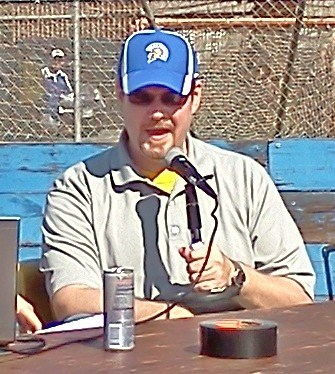
- Damon Bruce at the San Jose State football homecoming pre-game event in 2012.
- Born: Damon Matthew Bruce; 25 March 1975 (age 51); Chicago, Illinois, U.S.
- Education: Indiana University Bloomington
- Presenting career
- Show: Damon, Ratto, and Kolsky Show
- Station: KGMZ
- Time slot: Weekdays, 2:00 - 6:00 p.m. PST
- Style: Sports radio host
- Country: United States

Damon Matthew Bruce (born March 25, 1975) is an American sports radio host who hosted the Damon and Ratto (with Ray Ratto) on KGMZ-FM "95.7 the Game" in San Francisco, California. The Duo was replaced in a station shuffle in March 2023.

An Indiana University Bloomington graduate, Bruce began his radio career in the late 1990s as a producer with KNBR in San Francisco. He later hosted Sports Overnight America and became a reporter for the ESPN Radio and Sporting News Radio networks. After stints in Columbus, Ohio and Fort Wayne, Indiana, Bruce re-joined KNBR 680 in 2005 to host Sportsphone 680. From 2010 to 2014, Bruce hosted an afternoon talk show on KNBR's sister station KTCT "KNBR 1050" and joined CBS Sports Radio in 2013. Bruce also hosted pre-game and post-game shows for KNBR coverage of San Francisco 49ers and San Francisco Giants games. At the end of March 2014, he joined 95.7 the Game as the weekday late afternoon host.

== Early life ==
Bruce was born in Chicago, Illinois and grew up in Schenectady, New York. He attended Linton High School and graduated from Notre Dame-Bishop Gibbons High School of Schenectady in 1993. After attending Iona College for a year, Bruce transferred to Indiana University Bloomington and graduated with a degree in broadcasting in 1997.

== Radio career ==
=== Beginnings at KNBR, national networks, and Sportsphone 680 (1997–2010) ===
Bruce was a producer with KNBR 680 of San Francisco before leaving in 2000 to be a host on Sports Overnight America. Bruce later became an anchor-reporter for ESPN Radio and ESPN International. Later, he was a fill-in host on Fox Sports Radio and Sporting News Radio. Until December 2004, Bruce co-hosted afternoon drive-time show The Big Show with Kirk Herbstreit on Columbus, Ohio sports station 1460 the Fan. In March 2005, Bruce became morning announcer at news/talk station WOWO of Fort Wayne, Indiana before rejoining KNBR as host of evening show Sportsphone 680 in October 2005.

=== The Damon Bruce Show (2010–2023) ===
The Damon Bruce Show
- Genre: Sports
- Running time: 4 hours (3 to 7 p.m. PT)
- Country of origin: United States
- Language: English
- Home station: KNBR October 2005 - Feb 2010 KTCT (March 1, 2010–March 10, 2014); KGMZ (March 31, 2014 - March 9, 2023)
- Hosted by: Damon Bruce
- Recording studio: San Francisco, California
- Original release: March 1, 2010
- Opening theme: "Jenny Was a Friend of Mine" by The Killers
- Website: www.957thegame.com/pages/18560236.php
- Podcast: media.957thegame.com/damon-bruce.htm

After leaving SportsPhone 680, Bruce began hosting the noon-3 p.m. The Damon Bruce Show on sister station KTCT "KNBR 1050" on March 1, 2010. For a few weeks in 2011, Bruce returned to KNBR 680 to co-host the 9 a.m. to noon show with Gary Radnich. after a month Bruce returned to his show on 1050 and former SportsPhone680 host Larry Krueger began co-hosting with Gary. On the Damon Bruce show, Bruce comments on Bay Area and national sports and interviews journalists, athletes, and coaches.

During the San Francisco Giants's championship season in 2012, the team revoked Bruce's press credentials for the postseason. The Giants were unhappy that Bruce had tweeted revealing photos he had taken of women in T-shirts wet from champagne during a clubhouse celebration after they clinched their division.

In November 2013, Bruce delivered an eight-minute rant accusing the increased prevalence of women in sports journalism and discussion for, among other things, fostering public criticism of accused Miami Dolphins football player Richie Incognito, who was accused of bullying teammate Jonathan Martin. Beginning by acknowledging his words would be seen as misogynist, but that he was "so right," Bruce stated that "there are very few, a small handful, of women who are any good at this at all," and proclaimed "you see, I'm willing to share my sandbox as long as you're willing to remember: You're in my box." His comments generated a storm of media controversy and public outcry, culminating in his temporary suspension from KNBR 1050's "The Damon Bruce Show," and being stripped of his job broadcasting during San Francisco 49ers pre-game shows.

Bruce's last show on KTCT was on March 10, 2014. The following day, competing station KGMZ "95.7 the Game" announced that Bruce would become the 3-7 p.m. host effective March 31.

On March 9, 2023, Bruce was let go by KGMZ "95.7 the Game" in an apparent cost-cutting move by Audacy.

=== CBS Sports Radio (2013–2014) ===
Bruce joined the CBS Sports Radio network in 2013 as host of a weekly baseball talk show that premiered on April 20, Eye on Baseball. The show aired on Saturdays from 10 a.m. to noon (Eastern). Following from noon to 2 p.m. was a national version of The Damon Bruce Show. These shows ended in August 2013, and in January 2014, Bruce returned to CBS Sports Radio in the Saturday 10 p.m. to 2 a.m. (Eastern) time slot. Bruce left CBS Sports Radio after leaving KTCT, a CBS Sports Radio affiliate.

== Video games ==
Damon is the halftime host of 2K Sports' video game NBA 2K11, NBA 2K12, NBA 2K13 and NBA 2K14.

Bruce is also the play-by-play voice for the video game, The Bigs, released in June 2007 by 2K Sports.

The Bigs 2 was released on July 7, 2009. Bruce returns as the play-by-play announcer.

== Bibliography ==
- Bruce, Damon (2009), The Great Book of San Francisco Bay Area Sports Lists, Philadelphia: Running Press Book Publishers, ISBN 978-0762435210
