= San Francisco Giants Radio Network =

Professional baseball radio network

The San Francisco Giants Radio Network
- Type: Radio network
- Country: United States
- Availability: Regional in California, Nevada, and Hawaii (through 8 English-language and 5 Spanish-language affiliates)
- Official website: Giants broadcast network page

The San Francisco Giants Radio Network is the radio network of the San Francisco Giants. There are 15 stations (six AM, four FM, and five FM translators) in the English-language network, including the flagship KNBR/KNBR-FM (104.5 FM and 680 AM). Six stations (one AM and five FM) carry the team's broadcasts in Spanish, including the Spanish-language flagship KSFN (1510 AM), bringing the total number of radio stations carrying Giants baseball to 21.

The English-language network is identified on-air as the KNBR Northern California Honda Dealers Radio Network.

Announcers include Jon Miller, Dave Flemming, Duane Kuiper, and Mike Krukow on the English-language broadcasts, with Erwin Higueros, Tito Fuentes, and Marvin Benard handling Spanish-language duties.

== Network stations ==
=== English-language stations ===
Network stations as of the 2021 Giants season
Callsign	Frequency	Band	City	State	Network status
KNBR-FM	104.5	FM	San Francisco	California	Flagship
KNBR	680	AM	San Francisco	California	Flagship
KEKA-FM	101.5	FM	Eureka	California	Affiliate
K265BT	100.9	FM	Arcata	California	n/a (KEKA-FM simulcast)
KFIG	1430	AM	Fresno	California	Affiliate
KFPT	790	AM	Fresno	California	Affiliate
KHKA	1500	AM	Honolulu	Hawaii	Affiliate
K272GC	102.3	FM	Honolulu	Hawaii	n/a (KHKA simulcast)
KKJL	1400	AM	San Luis Obispo	California	Affiliate
K293AW	106.5	FM	San Luis Obispo	California	n/a (KKJL simulcast)
KPUA	670	AM	Hilo	Hawaii	Affiliate
K253CR	98.5	FM	Hilo	Hawaii	n/a (KPUA simulcast)
KUNK	92.7	FM	Mendocino	California	Affiliate
K244AH	96.7	FM	Ukiah	California	n/a (KUNK simulcast)

- Gray background indicates FM translator.

=== Spanish-language stations ===
Network stations as of the 2021 Giants season
Callsign	Frequency	Band	City	State	Network status
KSFN	1510	AM	San Francisco	California	Flagship
KBAA	103.3	FM	Grass Valley-Sacramento	California	Affiliate
KJOR	104.1	FM	Santa Rosa	California	Affiliate
KNEZ	107.3	FM	Reno	Nevada	Affiliate
KSGZ	95.1	FM	Salinas-Monterey	California	Affiliate
KXZM	93.7	FM	San Jose	California	Affiliate

== See also ==
- List of San Francisco Giants broadcasters
