= Kevin Radich =

American radio announcer

Kevin "The Rat" Radich
- Born: Kevin M. Radich; June 13, 1960 (age 65); Oakland, California
- Occupation: Radio personality

Kevin "The Rat" Radich (born June 13, 1960) was the weekday afternoon sports reporter on KGO AM 810, in San Francisco. He joined KGO in early 2007, after a year of work as a weekend sports anchor for KCBS 740 AM radio. His wife, Kim Wonderley, works at KCBS as the morning traffic anchor. On June 21, 2015 Ben Fong-Torres' column Radio Waves in the San Francisco Chronicle reported that Radich had been fired by KGO. Radich was honored with an APTRA Mark Twain Award in January 2009. The competition covered California, Nevada, Hawaii, Arizona, New Mexico, Washington, Idaho, Colorado, Utah, Montana, Wyoming, and Alaska. Judging took place at The Associated Press Bureau in Downtown Los Angeles with a panel of leading broadcast journalists that considered hundreds of entries from the 2008 calendar year.

R-4 BEST RADIO SPORTS SEGMENT “The KGO 5:25 PM Sports Report” Kevin Radich KGO, San Francisco

Radich began his radio career at KFOG in San Francisco in June 1985 after winning an on-air audition for a sports reporter. He later appeared as morning sports reporter on KRQR ("The Rocker") in San Francisco in the early 1990s.

Radich spent 15 years on the morning airwaves on KNBR 680 in San Francisco as a sports reporter using the nickname "Kevin The Rat." He was a central figure on the Frank Dill Show and later the Gary Radnich Show before leaving the station.

In 2003, Radich joined KHTK 1140 AM in Sacramento. He anchored the morning show, "The Rise Guys," along with Whitey Gleason and The Phantom. He left that show on November 11, 2005, to join his wife in the San Francisco Bay Area. She had started working at KCBS the previous year. Radich joined KCBS in December 2005. Radich's place was taken by former major leaguer F. P. Santangelo, who had previously been a fill-in host on San Francisco's KNBR 680.
