= KNBR =

KNBR may refer to:

- KNBR (AM), a radio station (680 AM) licensed to serve San Francisco, California, United States
- KNBR-FM, a radio station (104.5 FM) licensed to serve San Francisco, California
