= Tom Tolbert =

American basketball player (born 1965)

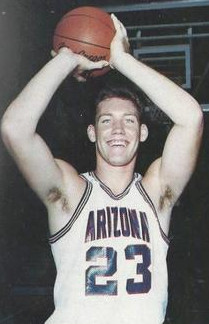
- Tolbert, circa 1987

Personal information
- Born: October 16, 1965 (age 61) Long Beach, California, U.S.
- Listed height: 6 ft 7 in (2.01 m)
- Listed weight: 235 lb (107 kg)

Career information
- High school: Artesia (Lakewood, California)
- College: UC Irvine (1983–1985); Cerritos (1985–1986); Arizona (1986–1988)
- NBA draft: 1988: 2nd round, 34th overall pick
- Drafted by: Charlotte Hornets
- Playing career: 1988–1995
- Position: Power forward
- Number: 23, 3, 40, 39

Career history
- 1988: Charlotte Hornets
- 1988–1989: Canarias
- 1989–1992: Golden State Warriors
- 1992–1993: Orlando Magic
- 1993–1994: Los Angeles Clippers
- 1994–1995: Charlotte Hornets

Career NBA statistics
- Points: 2,030 (6.5 ppg)
- Rebounds: 1,251 (4.0 rpg)
- Assists: 285 (0.9 apg)
- Stats at NBA.com
- Stats at Basketball Reference

Thomas Byron Tolbert Jr. (born October 16, 1965) is an American sports broadcaster and former professional basketball player. He played a total of seven seasons in the National Basketball Association (NBA). After retiring from basketball, Tolbert became a radio show co-host on KNBR in San Francisco and NBA commentator for the television networks NBC, ABC and NBA on ESPN.

== Early life ==
Tolbert graduated from Artesia High School in Lakewood, California in 1983.

== College career ==
Following high school, he played college basketball at the University of California, Irvine (1983–1985), Cerritos College (1985–86), and the University of Arizona (1986–1988). While at Arizona, Tolbert played under coach Lute Olson, helping the team to an appearance in the 1988 Final Four. At Arizona, Tolbert was a teammate of five-time NBA champion and future Golden State Warriors coach Steve Kerr.

== Professional career ==
In 1988, he was a second-round draft pick (9th pick, 34th overall) of the Charlotte Hornets.

Tolbert spent seven seasons playing for a number of NBA teams, including Charlotte (1988–89, 94–95), the Golden State Warriors (1989–92), the Orlando Magic (1992–93), and the Los Angeles Clippers (1993–94). He also played briefly for Canarias in the Spanish league. He retired following the 1994-95 season after his first son was born.

== Broadcasting career ==
=== Radio ===
In 1996, Tolbert was hired by KNBR, a San Francisco-based local sports radio station, to co-host a radio talk show titled The Razor and Mr. T with longtime Bay Area sports radio host Ralph Barbieri. The show attracted high ratings in the Bay Area with male listeners aged 25 to 54. The title of the show was changed to The Mr. T Show following the departure of Barbieri from KNBR in the summer of 2012. In 2014, with former San Francisco Chronicle columnist Ray Ratto becoming co-host, the show became Mr. T & Ratto. Beginning in 2019, Tolbert hosted the Tolbert, Krueger & Brooks Show. On February 25, 2022, Larry Kreuger and Rod Brooks were removed from the show.

On November 14, 2024, Tolbert was fired after 28 years with KNBR, as part of the station's latest round of layoffs.

From December 2012 to the end of the 2016 NBA season, Tolbert joined the Golden State Warriors Radio Network as color commentator alongside play-by-play announcer Tim Roye.

=== Television ===
In addition to his radio work in San Francisco, Tolbert was a color commentator for NBA telecasts on NBC. He was nominated for an Emmy in 2002 for his work as a commentator on NBC. He then worked for ESPN from 2002 to 2007. In 2003, Tolbert - along with Brad Nessler and Bill Walton - called the NBA Finals for ABC.

== Personal life ==
Tolbert lives in Alameda, California with his wife and three children.

In 2017, he suffered an aortic aneurysm and underwent emergency heart surgery. He returned to his radio hosting duties after a week-long recovery.

== Career statistics ==
Legend
GP	Games played	GS	Games started	MPG	Minutes per game
FG%	Field goal percentage	3P%	3-point field goal percentage	FT%	Free throw percentage
RPG	Rebounds per game	APG	Assists per game	SPG	Steals per game
BPG	Blocks per game	PPG	Points per game	**Bold**	Career high

=== NBA ===
==== Regular season ====
Year	Team	GP	GS	MPG	FG%	3P%	FT%	RPG	APG	SPG	BPG	PPG
1988–89	Charlotte	14	0	8.4	.459	.000	.500	1.5	.5	.1	.3	2.9
1989–90	Golden State	70	21	19.2	.493	.278	.727	5.2	.8	.3	.4	**8.8**
1990–91	Golden State	62	32	22.1	.423	.333	.738	4.4	1.2	**.6**	**.6**	8.1
1991–92	Golden State	35	0	8.9	.384	.250	.550	1.6	.6	.3	.2	2.6
1992–93	Orlando	**72**	**61**	**25.5**	**.498**	.321	.726	**5.7**	**1.3**	.5	.3	8.1
1993–94	L.A. Clippers	49	6	13.1	.418	**.375**	.733	2.2	.6	.3	.3	3.8
1994–95	Charlotte	10	0	5.7	.333	.000	**1.000**	1.7	.2	.0	.0	1.4
Career		312	120	18.2	.460	.296	.716	4.0	.9	.4	.3	6.5

==== Playoffs ====
Year	Team	GP	GS	MPG	FG%	3P%	FT%	RPG	APG	SPG	BPG	PPG
1991	Golden State	9	0	12.9	.424	.333	.273	2.0	.9	.3	.4	3.6
