= Joyce Barthelson =

American composer

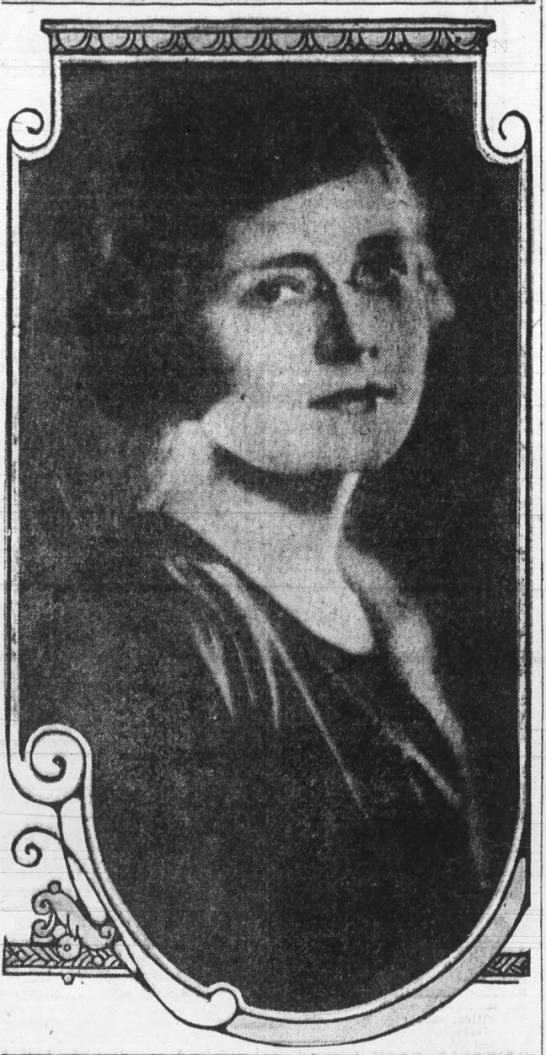
- Born: May 18, 1900; Yakima
- Died: December 1986; Scarsdale
- Education: University of California, Berkeley
- Occupations: Composer, pianist, educator

Helen Joyce Holloway Barthelson Steigman (May 18, 1900 – December 1986) was an American composer who created five operas and numerous shorter pieces. She co-founded the Hoff-Barthelson Music School in Scarsdale, New York.

== Life and career ==
Joyce Barthelson was born Helen Joyce Holloway in Yakima, Washington. She graduated from Oakland Technical High School in 1918. She studied music at the University of California, Berkeley under Julius Gold, Otto Cesana, Roy Harris, and Nicolas Flagello.

In high school, she formed a chamber music group, the Arion Trio, with two classmates. She played piano and the others cello and violin. In the 1920s and 30s they were regularly heard (with some lineup changes) on San Francisco-area radio. They were first heard on KLX in 1924, then moved on to KGO and the NBC Pacific Coast Network. Barthelson also played piano on the network's General Independents Program.

In the late 1930s and early 1940s she was assistant conductor of the New York Women's Symphony Orchestra and composer in residence at Western Maryland College.

In 1944, she founded the Hoff-Barthelson Music School with Virginia Hoff. The school is still in operation.

== Operas ==
- Chanticleer (1967), based on "The Nun's Priest's Tale" by Geoffrey Chaucer, won first prize in a nationwide opera contest held by the National Federation of Music Clubs.
- Feathertop (1968), a two-act opera with a libretto by Barthelson based on the 1846 short story by Nathaniel Hawthorne.
- Greenwich Village, 1910 (1969), a one-act opera based on the 1905 short story "The Gift of the Magi" by O. Henry, premiered at Scarsdale Junior High School.
- The King's Breakfast (1973), a one-act opera based on a work by Maurice Baring about a breakfast quarrel between King Henry VIII and his sixth wife Catherine Parr.
- The Devil's Disciple (1977), a two-act opera with a libretto by Barthelson based on the 1897 play by George Bernard Shaw. It premiered at the Highlands School in White Plains, New York, directed by Antonia Brico, Barthelson's high school classmate.

== Personal life ==
She married Harold Charles Barthelson on December 23, 1921. She later married Benjamin Steigman, author and principal of the New York City High School of Music & Art.
