= Matt Steinmetz =

American journalist and television sportscaster (born 1964)

Matthew Steinmetz (born September 26, 1964, in Reading, Pennsylvania) is an American journalist and television sportscaster who worked as the pregame and postgame analyst for Comcast SportsNet Bay Area, the broadcast home of the Golden State Warriors of the NBA. He was also an WNBA writer for Comcast Sportsnet Bay Area. He is now the host of Steiny and Guru on 95.7 THE GAME based in the San Francisco Bay.

== Career ==
Previous to his current role, Steinmetz was featured numerous times per week as the Golden State Warriors Insider on local radio station 95.7 The Game (KGMZ-FM), an Entercom station.

In 2007, Steinmetz earned a Northern California Emmy Award for on-camera talent as part of the Warriors broadcast team. From 2004 through 2007, Steinmetz was part of the Warriors’ radio and television Roundtable programs, and co-hosted the radio Roundtable with Tim Roye, the team's radio play-by-play man.

Steinmetz worked as the Golden State Warriors beat writer for the Contra Costa Times (Walnut Creek, CA) from 1996 through 2005. While working for the Contra Costa Times, Steinmetz earned the Associated Press Sports Editors first-place award for Best News Story of 1997 (circ. 50,000-175,000) for his reporting of the Latrell Sprewell-P.J. Carlesimo choking incident. He is also best friend with fellow 95.7 host Ray Ratto.

The San Francisco Peninsula Press Club honored Steinmetz in 2000 for his story on Joe DiMaggio (Joe's Grace Lifted Him Above Game). Steinmetz also worked as a basketball columnist for the San Francisco Examiner.

== Early life ==
Steinmetz grew up in Reading, Pennsylvania and attended Holy Name High School.

== Education ==
He graduated from Franklin and Marshall College in Lancaster, Pennsylvania, where he played four years of varsity basketball and worked at WFNM, the campus’ college radio station.
