= Mychael Urban =

American baseball writer

Mychael Urban was a San Francisco native and longtime Bay Area sportswriter, radio and TV personality. Known best for his multimedia coverage and analysis of the San Francisco Giants, Oakland A's and Major League Baseball, he also covered the NBA's Golden State Warriors, the NFL's San Francisco 49ers and the NHL's San Jose Sharks. Among other varied assignments, he was contracted to work five Olympic Games for NBC, contributed to ESPN and its magazine, and authored a best-seller.

== Biography ==
=== Education ===
Mychael was a graduate of the University of San Francisco, where he majored in Communications with a Journalism emphasis and was a left-handed pitcher for the Dons’ NCAA Division I baseball team, earning a spot on the All-West Coast Conference Scholar-Athlete list of honors.

Immediately after graduating from Woodside High School —- where he played four sports, was a first-team All-County selection in baseball and basketball, and earned All-Bay Area honors in the latter —- he accepted an offer to attend and play baseball at USF. The following year he transferred to Cañada College in Redwood City, where he played basketball and baseball for the Colts and became the first athlete in school history — and remains the only athlete — to win a Central Coast Conference championship in two sports. He then returned to USF, where he was the sports editor of the school newspaper, was a color analyst for USF basketball radio broadcasts, and hosted a late-night program on KUSF-FM while earning his degree and playing baseball for two more years.

== Media ==
After working as a writer, editor and photographer for a variety of newspapers for eight years after graduating from USF, Urban moved his career online with Quokka Sports in San Francisco, helping to develop and populate NBCOlympics.com in advance of the Sydney (Summer) Games, during which he served as the co-managing editor of a team of more than 300 on two continents. He then served as senior writer/editor for FinalFour.net, the official website of the NCAA basketball tournament, as well as NBC's Golf.com. Four days after Quokka disbanded, he was hired by MLB.com and covered the Oakland A's as a traveling beat writer for two seasons before being promoted to National Writer. In October 2009 he left MLB.com to become the first "MLB Insider" for Comcast SportsNet Bay Area (now NBC Sports Bay Area), providing online coverage of both Bay Area baseball teams in addition to serving as an in-studio analyst and on-site reporter for pre- and post-game telecasts. He also hosted the network's weekly offseason "Hot Stove Show.” He currently provides content for startups MyWyldLife.com and GoatNet.com.

=== Radio ===
Mychael has been a fixture on local Bay Area radio since 2002, first with KNBR and then 95.7 The Game. He hosted KNBR's weekend edition of "SportsPhone 680" before and after every San Francisco Giants broadcast from 2007 thru 2010. In 2011, Urban was replaced full-time by Marty Lurie, who was hired part-time in 2010, in part because Urban's work writing and TV work for CSNBA prevented him from hosting his pre- and post-game radio shows during the Giants’ postseason run, which culminated in the team's first World Series title since moving to the West Coast from New York for the start of the 1958 season. KNBR brought Urban back after the 2011 All-Star break, but he left for more regular air time at The Game shortly thereafter. While at The Game, he frequently co-hosted “The Wheelhouse" with John Lund, who now works for KNBR, and was a regular part-time host and co-host, filling in when needed in every time slot. Urban also hosted "Inside the Bigs" every weekend during the baseball season from 2011 to 2019.

=== "Aces" Book ===
Mychael was the author of the book "Aces: The Last Season on the Mound with the Oakland A's Big Three: Tim Hudson, Mark Mulder and Barry Zito.” It was published and released by Wiley & Sons in March 2005 and made the San Francisco Chronicle Best-Seller list.

=== Personal ===
Urban spent the summer of 1998 as the pitching coach for the Slovakia national baseball team, which finished fifth at the European Championships in Hull, England. The team had never before finished higher than 13th in a major international competition, and under Urban's leadership, Slovakia's pitching staff had the lowest team ERA in the tournament. Urban also has coached at the high school and youth levels, and from 2010 to 2017 provided pitching lessons for children ages 6–18. Mychael was born in San Francisco, grew up in Redwood City, and later lived in Houston. In October 2012, he left full-time media to work for Generations Healthcare, for whom he was a licensed Nursing Home Administrator, running Skilled Nursing facilities in Daly City and San Jose. In August 2017 he left the healthcare industry in an effort to return to full-time media work.
