= KTOX =

- Needles, California; United States
- Broadcast area: Laughlin, Nevada
- Frequency: 1340 kHz
- Branding: KTOX 1340 AM

Programming
- Format: Talk radio
- Affiliations: Premiere Networks; Salem Radio Network; Townhall News; Westwood One; Vegas Golden Knights

Ownership
- Owner: Rubin Broadcasting, Inc.
- Sister stations: KUNK

History
- First air date: 1952
- Former call signs: KSFE (1952–1991)
- Call sign meaning: "Talks"

Technical information
- Licensing authority: FCC
- Facility ID: 12189
- Class: C
- Power: 1,000 watts (unlimited)
- Transmitter coordinates: 34°51′10″N 114°37′21.9″W
- Translator: 92.9 K225DF (Needles)

Links
- Public license information: Public file; LMS
- Webcast: Listen live
- Website: ktox1340.com

KTOX (1340 AM) is a radio station broadcasting a talk radio format. Licensed to Needles, California, United States, the station serves the Laughlin, Bullhead City, Fort Mohave, Topock and Kingman areas. The station is currently owned by Rubin Broadcasting, Inc., and features programming from Premiere Networks, Salem Radio Network and Westwood One.
