= KSAN (FM) =

Classic rock radio station in San Mateo, California

- San Mateo, California; United States
- Broadcast area: San Francisco Bay Area
- Frequency: 107.7 MHz (HD Radio)
- Branding: 107.7 The Bone

Programming
- Format: Classic rock
- Subchannels: HD2: KSFO simulcast (Conservative talk); HD3: KTCT simulcast (Sports radio)
- Affiliations: San Francisco 49ers Radio Network

Ownership
- Owner: Cumulus Media Inc.; (Radio License Holding SRC LLC)
- Sister stations: KNBR; KNBR-FM; KSFO; KTCT

History
- First air date: April 1, 1963 (as KUFY)
- Former call signs: KUFY (1963–1968); KVEZ (1969–1974); KSOL (1974–1994); KYLD (1994–1997)
- Call sign meaning: San or Santa, the masculine and feminine Spanish words for saint, which prefix the name of several Bay Area communities

Technical information
- Licensing authority: FCC
- Facility ID: 14484
- Class: B
- ERP: 8,900 watts
- HAAT: 354 meters (1,161 ft)
- Transmitter coordinates: 37°41′20″N 122°26′11″W
- Repeater: See § Booster

Links
- Public license information: Public file; LMS
- Webcast: Listen live; Listen live; Listen live (via iHeartRadio); Listen live (via Audacy)
- Website: www.1077thebone.com

KSAN (107.7 MHz, "107.7 The Bone") is a commercial FM radio station licensed to San Mateo, California, and serving the San Francisco Bay Area. It is owned and operated by Cumulus Media and it airs a classic rock radio format. It also serves as the FM flagship station for the San Francisco 49ers Radio Network. KSAN's studios and offices are located in Daly City, California.

KSAN has an effective radiated power (ERP) of 8,900 watts. Its transmitter is off Radio Road on San Bruno Mountain in Brisbane, California. KSAN broadcasts in the HD Radio hybrid format.

== History ==
=== KUFY/KVEZ ===
On April 1, 1963, KUFY signed on the air. It was the FM counterpart of KOFY (now KTCT), owned by Intercontinental Radio, Inc. While the AM station aired a regional Mexican format, KUFY played beautiful music, mostly instrumental cover versions of popular songs along with Hollywood and Broadway showtunes.

Because KUFY played easy listening music, the call sign changed to KVEZ in 1968.

=== KSOL ===
In 1975, the station flipped to an urban contemporary format and took the call letters KSOL for "K-Soul". The original K-Soul broadcast on 1450 AM (now KEST). KSOL became the first urban radio station on the FM dial in the San Francisco Bay Area. Local musician Sly Stone played a part in influencing the station to make the switch.

While KSOL managed to fend off competition from KBLX unscathed throughout the 1980s, KSOL's ratings began to decline due to competition from KMEL, then a Top 40 station which was slowly evolving in a rhythmic contemporary format before going in a mainstream urban direction. Eventually, the decision was made to end KSOL and its format. The DJs were notified beforehand and held a goodbye show to send off KSOL on February 10, 1992. The final song on KSOL was "Miss You Much" by Janet Jackson. Afterwards, KSOL segued into a 72-hour loop of "Wild Thing" by Tone Lōc.

=== KYLD ===
On February 13, 1992, at 3 p.m., 107.7 FM flipped to rhythmic contemporary, branded as "WiLD 107". The first song on "WiLD" was "D.M.S.R" by Prince. For the first year and a half, the station retained the old KSOL call letters.

Allen Shaw's Crescent Communications bought the station in December 1993 for $13.5 million. KSOL's call letters were changed to KYLD the following year. The company also purchased 99.1 in San Jose from Viacom, and began simulcasting KYLD's programming in the South Bay, to expand coverage. Program Director Rick Thomas and Music Director Michael Martin set a plan in motion to overtake KMEL; they came up with a strategy of playing "old school" and up tempo freestyle/dance songs like those heard on heritage San Jose radio station HOT 97.7. KMEL moved from rhythmic to urban contemporary at the same time, and the two stations battled with each other throughout the mid-1990s.

=== KSAN ===
At 12:01 a.m. on July 2, 1997, KYLD moved to 94.9 FM. 107.7 and 94.9 would simulcast until Midnight on July 7, when 107.7 FM, now with the KSAN call letters, began stunting with construction noises and song clips as a prelude to a flip to classic rock at noon on July 11.

On March 13, 2000, after playing "Goodbye Yellow Brick Road" by Elton John, followed by a stunt with funeral bells, the station relaunched as "The Bone", playing classic rock with a harder edge. To initiate this change, the station played AC/DC "A to Z", all 154 songs the band had recorded at that point, aired in alphabetical order.

=== Classic to mainstream rock ===
With the demise of rival rock station KSJO in 2004, the station adopted a mainstream rock format. The playlist shifted back toward classic rock in April 2017. Today, the station primarily plays hard rock from the '70s to '90s with an occasional 2000s track here or there. The weekday on-air staff at The Bone consisted of morning team Lamont & Tonelli, as well as Chasta, Steven Seaweed and Zakk.

In early 2016, Steven Seaweed's "All Request Hot Lunch" was cancelled by the program director. In August, Lejf Jaeger left the Bone. He had been part-time weekends for ten years. With his departure, "Local Licks" was also removed from the programming.

Steven Seaweed retired on July 1, 2017, after 44 years of deejaying in the Bay Area, the last 20 of which had been with KSAN. On November 15, 2024, the station parted ways with longtime morning hosts Lamont & Tonelli. This was related to layoffs at Cumulus Media.

== Sports ==
Throughout the NFL season, the station broadcasts San Francisco 49ers games. While co-owned KNBR and KTCT are the primary flagship stations for the team, KSAN also airs the games.

== Booster ==
KSAN is rebroadcast on the following FM booster:

Call sign	Frequency	City of license	FID	ERP (W)	HAAT	Class	FCC info
KSAN-FM1	107.7 FM	Pleasanton, California	28878	185 (Horiz.)	926 m (3,038 ft)	D	LMS

== HD Radio ==
KSAN broadcasts in the HD Radio format.

From 2016 to 2018, the HD2 channel carried the Nash FM country music network.
