= Ralph Barbieri =

American sports journalist (1945–2020)

- Born: October 28, 1945; San Francisco, California
- Died: August 3, 2020 (aged 74); Novato, California
- Education: University of San Francisco (BA); University of Pennsylvania (MBA)

Ralph Louis Barbieri (October 28, 1945 – August 3, 2020) was an American sports radio personality from San Francisco, California. Along with former NBA player Tom Tolbert, Barbieri hosted the afternoon sports radio show The Razor and Mr. T on KNBR (AM) from 1996 to 2012. With Barbieri, the show was the highest-rated show in the Bay Area for the 25–54 male demographic since 2000.

== Early life and education ==
Barbieri was born in San Francisco to Louis J. and Gloria Barbieri. He grew up in Millbrae, California. Barbieri earned a bachelor's degree in 1967 from the University of San Francisco, having studied political science with a minor in philosophy. He proceeded to obtain a Master of Business Administration from the Wharton School at the University of Pennsylvania. After completing his studies, he spent one-and-a-half years in New York, where he found employment in advertising. He subsequently returned to San Francisco.

== Career ==
Barbieri was a stringer for Sport magazine before he joined KNBR in 1984 at the sports news desk. He was later given his own sports talk show and transferred to the prime afternoon-time slot. In 1996, he was teamed with Tolbert, a former NBA player. Barbieri's nickname was "The Razor" because of his raspy voice, thought by some listeners to resemble a barber's electric razor and his "no-nonsense" approach to interviews. The nickname, which may have also been inspired by his surname's resemblance to "barber", was given to him by longtime San Francisco Chronicle columnist Herb Caen.

Barbieri was described as a "bulldog of an interviewer" who exuded an "opinionated" and "abrasive" interviewing style. At the same time, his critics took the view that his questions were long-winded and restrained, which he said enabled listeners to get a better grasp of the people he was interviewing. In 2007, Barbieri renewed his four-year contract with KNBR through November 2011. Barbieri was known to end his show with, "Angels fly because they take themselves lightly", a quote from G. K. Chesterton.

In 2011, Barbieri disclosed to KNBR and the public that he was diagnosed with Parkinson's disease in 2005. On April 11, 2012, the 66-year-old Barbieri was let go by KNBR. KNBR's parent company, Cumulus Media, said he "refused to honor some of the most basic terms of his contract". Barbieri's legal team cited age discrimination and disability discrimination in the termination. In 2013, he settled with Cumulus for an undisclosed amount, reportedly over $1 million.

== Personal life ==
Barbieri was a vegetarian, a believer in animal rights, and a follower of eastern religious philosophies. In 1995, he avoided jail time by pleading no contest to a third-offense drunk driving charge; he spent 120 days in a residential treatment program. Following the incident, Barbieri settled down, giving up what he called "25 years of sex, drugs and rock and roll". In 2000, Barbieri fathered a son, Tayte Ali, via In vitro fertilisation, using an egg donor and a surrogate mother. In 2004, the American Diabetes Association named Ralph Barbieri one of five "Bay Area Father of the Year" award winners.

Barbieri died on August 3, 2020, at his home in Novato, California. He was 74, and suffered from Parkinson's disease since he was diagnosed in 2005.
