= KKEA =

- Honolulu, Hawaii; United States
- Broadcast area: Honolulu metropolitan area
- Frequency: 1420 kHz
- Branding: The New 1420

Programming
- Format: News/talk and sports
- Network: ABC News Radio; Westwood One Sports
- Affiliations: Hawaii Rainbow Warriors and Rainbow Wahine

Ownership
- Owner: Blow Up, LLC
- Sister stations: KHKA

History
- First air date: September 1, 1966
- Former call signs: KCCN (1966–2002)

Technical information
- Licensing authority: FCC
- Facility ID: 34551
- Class: B
- Power: 5,000 watts unlimited
- Transmitter coordinates: 21°19′14.7″N 157°52′37″W

Links
- Public license information: Public file; LMS
- Webcast: Listen live
- Website: www.hawaiisnewsandsports.com

KKEA (1420 AM) is a radio station in the United States. Licensed in Honolulu, Hawaii, the station broadcasts a news/talk/sports format, branded The New 1420. It is owned by Blow Up LLC.

The station originally broadcast as KCCN from 1966 with a Hawaiian music format. A popular station in the 1970s and 1980s, KCCN helped increase interest in the genre. After nearly three decades, KCCN changed formats from Hawaiian music to talk and sports in 1998, with a focus on University of Hawaii sports. Beginning in 2002, the station took on call sign KKEA. In 2026, KKEA swapped formats with KHKA to de-emphasize sports while adding more news and talk shows.

== History ==
=== As KCCN (1966–2002) ===
Founded by the Diamond Head Broadcasting Company, the station first signed on September 1, 1966, with call sign KCCN. The station had its official dedication on November 1, 1966, its first day of 24-hour broadcasting.

KCCN was first licensed by the Federal Communications Commission on January 16, 1967, following nearly four years of construction permits. Diamond Head Broadcasting sold KCCN to Texas-based Grayson Enterprises in 1970.

With the slogan "All Hawaiian, all the time," KCCN originally had a Hawaiian music format. Its call sign reflected the last names of founders Perry W. Carle, Ralph Bingham Cloward, and Jerry Neville. The station's first studios were located on a small, concrete building at Nimitz Highway and Waiakamilo, in the Kalihi section of Honolulu, and programming was automated. By around 1977, KCCN's studios were on Kalākaua Avenue in Waikiki.

In its early years, KCCN struggled financially. Advertising was sold in exchange for goods instead of money, such as a station wagon offered by a local dealership. However, KCCN became more popular in Honolulu in the 1970s and 1980s. For example, the spring 1976 Arbitron ratings ranked KCCN fourth among Honolulu stations, with about 65,000 listeners per 15 minutes. Then in spring 1983, KCCN finished ninth out of 18 stations in the Radio & Records Honolulu ratings report.

KCCN is also credited for increasing concert and record sales for "fairly unknown Hawaiian musicians", as the Honolulu Star-Advertiser quoted the nephew of KCCN co-founder Cloward. KCCN had been the only Hawaiian music station in the Honolulu area in 1985, but four stations took on that format by 2002.

KCCN added a sister FM station in 1990 with a Hawaiian reggae format.

A decades long relationship with University of Hawaii athletics began in 1993, when KCCN signed a five-year contract with the Rainbow Sports Network to broadcast Hawaii Rainbow Warriors football, basketball, and other sports.

Beginning August 19, 1996, KCCN debuted an afternoon sports talk show co-produced with KHON-TV.

In January 1998, KCCN signed a new five-year contract to broadcast University of Hawaii sports. On February 9, 1998, KCCN changed its format from Hawaiian music to talk.

Cox Radio purchased KCCN and two other stations from KHWY Inc. in 2000.

=== As KKEA (2002–present) ===
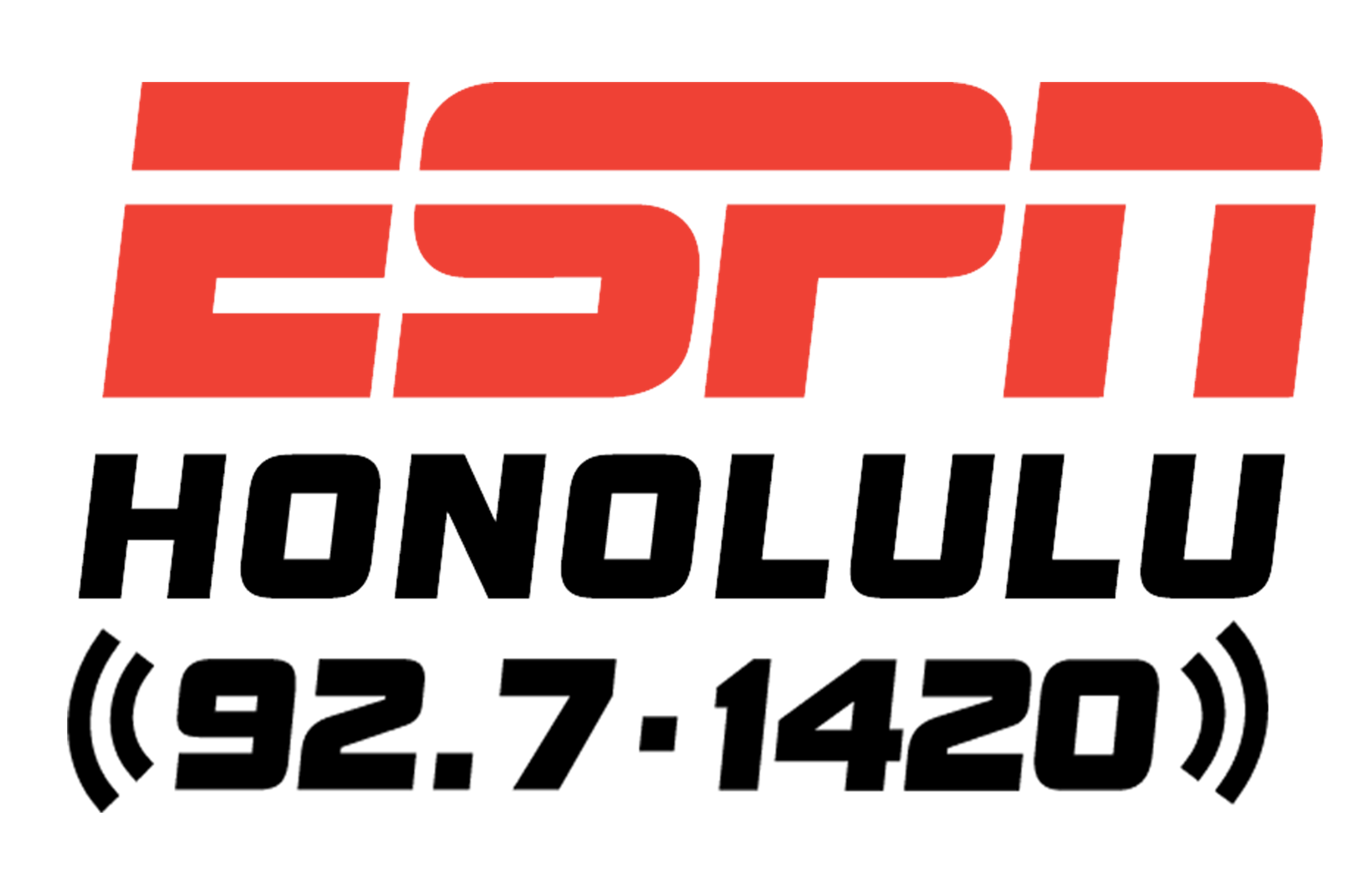
KKEA logo from 2019 to 2026.

After 36 years, KCCN changed its call sign to the modern KKEA on June 30, 2002. This followed the station being purchased by Hawaii-based Blow Up LLC from Cox Radio for $750,000. One condition in the purchase was a change in call sign.

KKEA signed contract extensions with University of Hawaii athletics in 2005 and 2008.

Beginning around June 2006, KKEA changed its brand to ESPN 1420, emphasizing its affiliation with ESPN Radio.

On March 2, 2026, KKEA swapped formats with 1500 KHKA. KKEA's old ESPN brand and local programming moved to KHKA, while KKEA took on KHKA's news/talk/sports format rebranded as "The New 1420".

== Programming ==
KKEA broadcasts a variety of news and sports programming. It simulcasts local news shows with KHON-TV and has live coverage of Hawaii high school sports, Hawaii Rainbow Warriors baseball, and Hawaii Rainbow Wahine volleyball. National news and talk shows on KKEA are from ABC News Radio and Westwood One, in addition to national sports coverage from Westwood One Sports.
