= KHKA =

- Honolulu, Hawaii; United States
- Broadcast area: Honolulu metropolitan area
- Frequency: 1500 kHz
- Branding: ESPN Honolulu

Programming
- Format: Sports
- Network: ESPN Radio
- Affiliations: San Francisco 49ers; San Francisco Giants; Hawaii Rainbow Warriors

Ownership
- Owner: Blow Up, LLC
- Sister stations: KKEA

History
- First air date: March 1, 1963
- Former call signs: KUMU (1963–2010)

Technical information
- Licensing authority: FCC
- Facility ID: 31600
- Class: B
- Power: 5,000 watts
- Transmitter coordinates: 21°19′54.7″N 157°53′27″W
- Translator: 102.3 K272GC (Honolulu)

Links
- Public license information: Public file; LMS
- Webcast: Listen live
- Website: www.espnhonolulu.com

KHKA (1500 AM) is a commercial radio station in the United States. Licensed to Honolulu, Hawaii, the station broadcasts a sports format branded ESPN Honolulu. KHKA is an official radio partner of Hawaii Rainbow Warriors football, and carries local high school sports, as well as San Francisco 49ers football games and San Francisco Giants baseball games.

The station is owned by Blow Up, LLC. KHKA is powered at 5,000 watts, using a non-directional antenna. Its transmitter is off Nimitz Highway in Honolulu, near Kakauiki Village. KHKA is also heard on 99-watt FM translator K272GC at 102.3 MHz. It retransmits on Oceanic Spectrum digital channel 885 for the entire state of Hawaii.

== History ==
=== As KUMU (1963–2010) ===
The station signed on the air on March 1, 1963. The original call sign was KUMU. In 1967, it added an FM sister station. KUMU-FM 94.7 MHz. KUMU AM aired a beautiful music format throughout the 1960s to 1990s.

In the early 2000s, KUMU had an adult standards format. A few years later, it flipped to sports talk as a network affiliate of Sporting News Radio. In 2010, KUMU once again became a simulcast of KUMU-FM, airing its Rhythmic Adult Contemporary format.

On August 2, 2010, Ohana Broadcast Company, LLC, sold KUMU 1500 to Blow Up, LLC, for $250,000.

=== As KHKA (2010–present) ===
On September 30, 2010, the call sign was changed to KHKA and it returned to a sports talk format. In April 2013, KHKA rebranded as NBC Sports Radio 1500 AM.

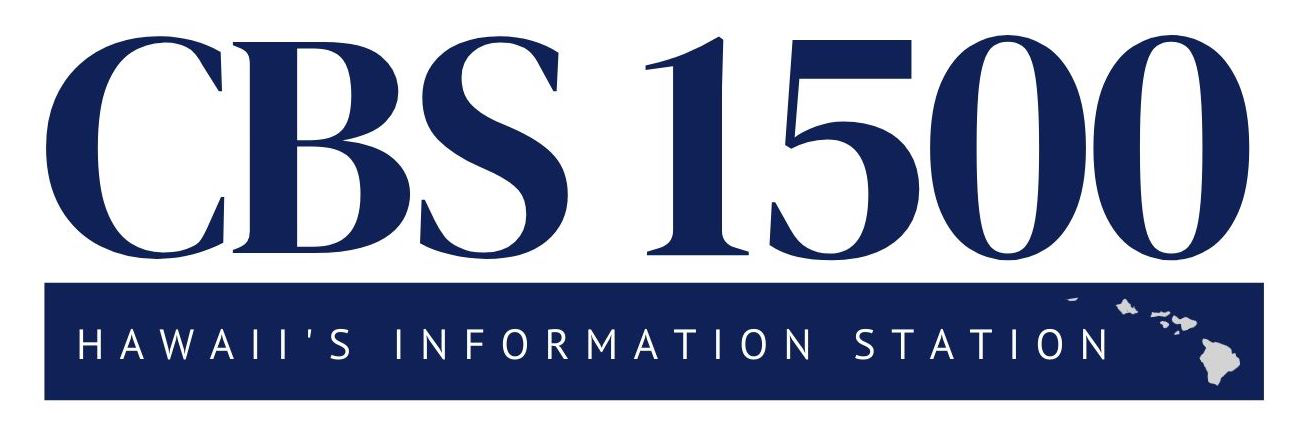
KHKA logo from 2019 to 2026.

On January 1, 2019, KHKA became an affiliate of CBS Sports Radio as a result of NBC Sports Radio discontinuing its full-time network programming. By May 2020, KHKA rebranded as "CBS 1500" as it added programming from CBS News Radio and Hawaii News Now to the lineup while retaining CBS Sports Radio programs.

On March 2, 2026, KHKA swapped formats with 1420 KKEA. KHKA's news and talk shows moved to KKEA, while KHKA rebranded as "ESPN Honolulu" with the former sports format and ESPN Radio affiliation of KKEA.
