= Joe Starkey =

American sportscaster (born 1941)

Joseph K. Starkey (born 1941) is an American sportscaster who served as the radio play-by-play announcer of California Golden Bears football from 1975 to 2022. He previously worked as the sports director of KGO radio in San Francisco, California and play-by-play announcer for the San Francisco 49ers for 20 seasons from 1989 to 2008.

Starkey is most famous for his frenetic call of The Play in the 1982 Big Game between Cal and Stanford: "Oh, the band is out on the field!" Starkey nearly lost his voice during and after this event, which he hailed as "the most amazing, sensational, dramatic, heartrending, exciting, thrilling finish in the history of college football!"

== Career ==
Starkey grew up in Chicago and briefly played football at Thornton Junior College. He attended Loyola University Chicago, graduating in 1964 with a Bachelor of Business Administration and Master of Science in international relations in 1965.

He has broadcast for the NFL's Minnesota Vikings (1977) and Denver Broncos, the USFL's Oakland Invaders and the first telecaster for the NHL's San Jose Sharks. Starkey was also the radio and television voice of the now defunct National Hockey League's Oakland (later California Golden) Seals and Colorado Rockies, who later became the New Jersey Devils. His trademark call, whenever the Seals scored a goal, was "What a bonanza!" It was the same call he carried into his football broadcasts to describe outlandish catches, notably by Jerry Rice and Terrell Owens.

Other previous assignments include the Pittsburgh Penguins of the NHL and basketball games for the NBA's Golden State Warriors and the University of California Golden Bears.

On August 18, 2022, the University of California announced that Starkey would retire after the Golden Bears' 2022 season.

=== San Francisco 49ers ===
Prior to assuming play-by-play duties with the 49ers in 1989 he served as color analyst on 49ers radio broadcasts in 1987 and 1988 with the legendary Lon Simmons handling play-by-play (although during the 1987 and 88 seasons, Starkey did call play by play on several regular season games as Simmons was busy calling games for the 49ers fellow tenant at Candlestick Park, the San Francisco Giants). He also called the radio broadcasts of Super Bowl XXIV and Super Bowl XXIX.

He was involved in the radio call of several of the team's most famous moments. In addition to his Super Bowl calls, the most famous of which would prove to be Deion Sanders' out-of-bounds end-zone interception which ended Super Bowl XXIX, Starkey was play-by-play announcer for the 1998 club's two signature moments - Garrison Hearst's 96-yard touchdown in overtime against the New York Jets and Steve Young's game-winning touchdown to Terrell Owens against the Green Bay Packers - The Catch II. Starkey also broadcast San Francisco's 2002 playoff comeback against the New York Giants.

Young almost falls down...throws to the endzone—OWENS! OWENS! OWENS! OWENS! OWENS! He caught it! He caught it! He caught it! A 25-yard touchdown pass! Terrell Owens, he hasn't held on to anything—including his fingers—all day and he makes the winning touchdown catch! I don't believe it! One of the greatest finishes in 49er history! Somehow, someway, Owens, right down the middle! The coverage was there, he had very little room, the ball had to be perfect—IT WAS! And he caught it! Niners will win it! Niners will win it!

— Joe Starkey's call of The Catch II on January 3, 1999.

When the 49ers moved their broadcasts from KGO to rival station KNBR in 2005, Starkey had to resign from KGO in order to continue his role with the 49ers. Starkey is still the broadcaster for the Cal Bears on KGO radio indefinitely.

On December 18, 2008, Starkey announced his retirement as the play-by-play announcer of the 49ers, citing difficulties with travel from Saturday Cal football games to Sunday 49ers games.

In December 2010, The National Football Foundation honored him with "The Chris Schenkel Award" for his long and distinguished career broadcasting college football for the University of California at its annual awards dinner at the Waldorf Astoria in New York City. He was nine times voted Best California play-by-play broadcaster by the Associated Press and was inducted into the Bay Area Radio Hall of Fame in 2009. In 2016, he was inducted in the University of California Sports Hall of Fame.

== Personal ==
Starkey and his wife Diane reside in the Bay Area. They have three sons and six grandchildren.

Preceded by Jim Forney	Pittsburgh Penguins radio play-by-play announcer 1973-1974	Succeeded by Mike Lange
Preceded by Lon Simmons	San Francisco 49ers radio play-by-play announcer 1989-2008	Succeeded by Ted Robinson
