= NBC Orange Network =

Former American regional radio network

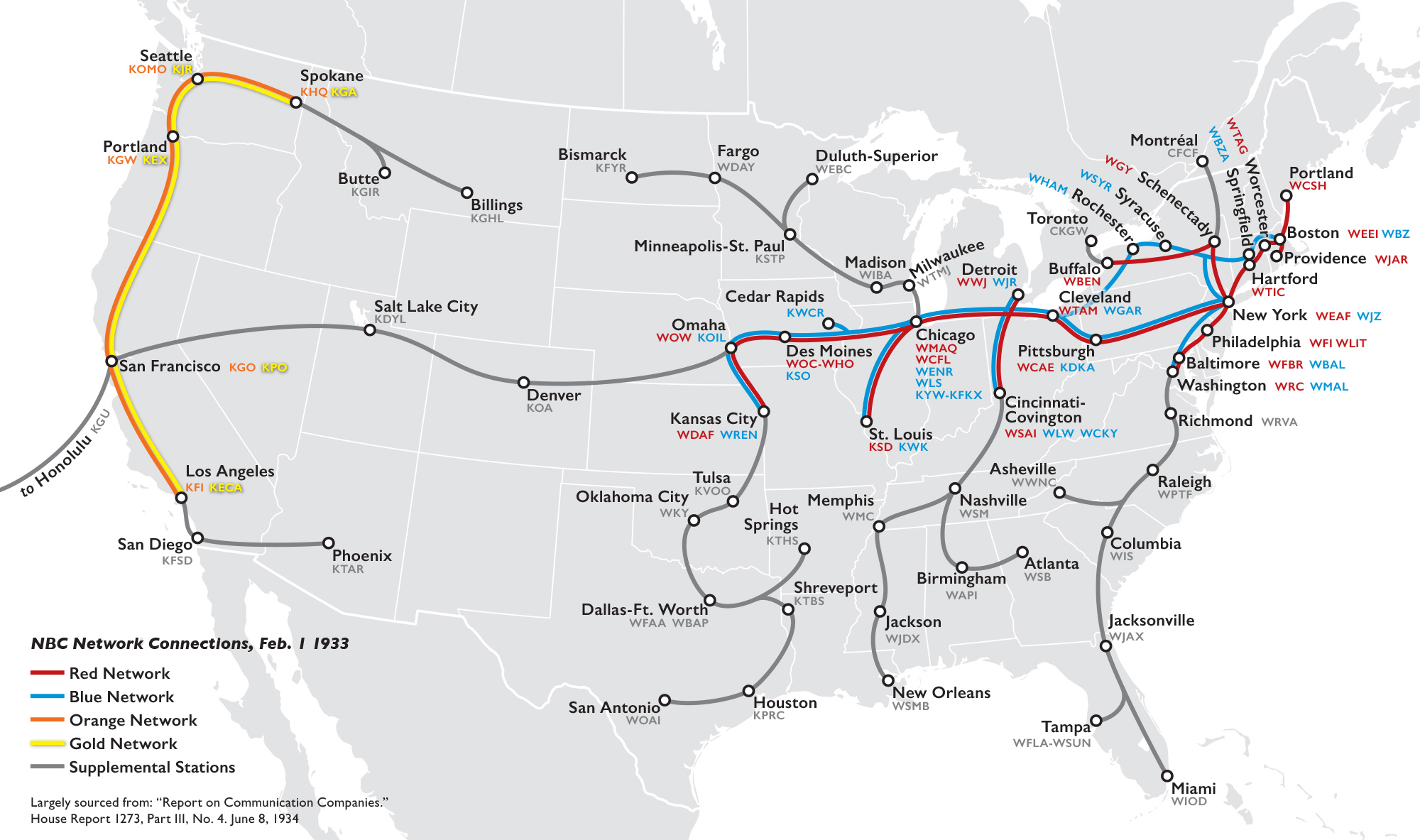
NBC networks, February 1, 1933

The NBC Orange Network, also known as the NBC Pacific Coast network, was a National Broadcasting Company radio network in the western United States from 1927 to 1936, before two-way broadcast-quality communications circuits reached the West to relay the larger NBC Red Network and NBC Blue Network.

In 1926, NBC started the Orange Network, its third network, serving the West Coast.

In 1927, NBC began broadcasting from space rented in the Saint Francis Hotel. It operated there for a short time before moving to the Hunter–Dulin Building's 22nd floor.

The Orange Network had its own production and performance staffs on the West Coast. In addition to producing original West Coast works, the Orange Network also had duplicate productions of many eastern shows until the end of 1928. In December 1928, a single broadcast-quality line was completed to San Francisco, and the Orange Network could then carry eastern programming directly, but only one program at a time; from then until 1936, Orange Network fed some programs from Red and some from Blue.

In 1936, a second broadcast-quality circuit was completed, this time to Los Angeles. This circuit also allowed the direction of amplification to be reversed in under 15 seconds, allowing Los Angeles, with its easy access to talent during the Golden Age of Hollywood, to feed broadcast-quality sound to the eastern networks as well. With the opening of the second circuit, the need for the Orange Network disappeared, and the stations on the old Orange Network became the Pacific Coast Red Network, fed by KPO (AM), except KGO (AM), which itself fed a new Western Blue Network made up of stations on the short-lived former NBC Gold Network.
