= Gary Plummer (American football) =

American football player and broadcaster (born 1960)

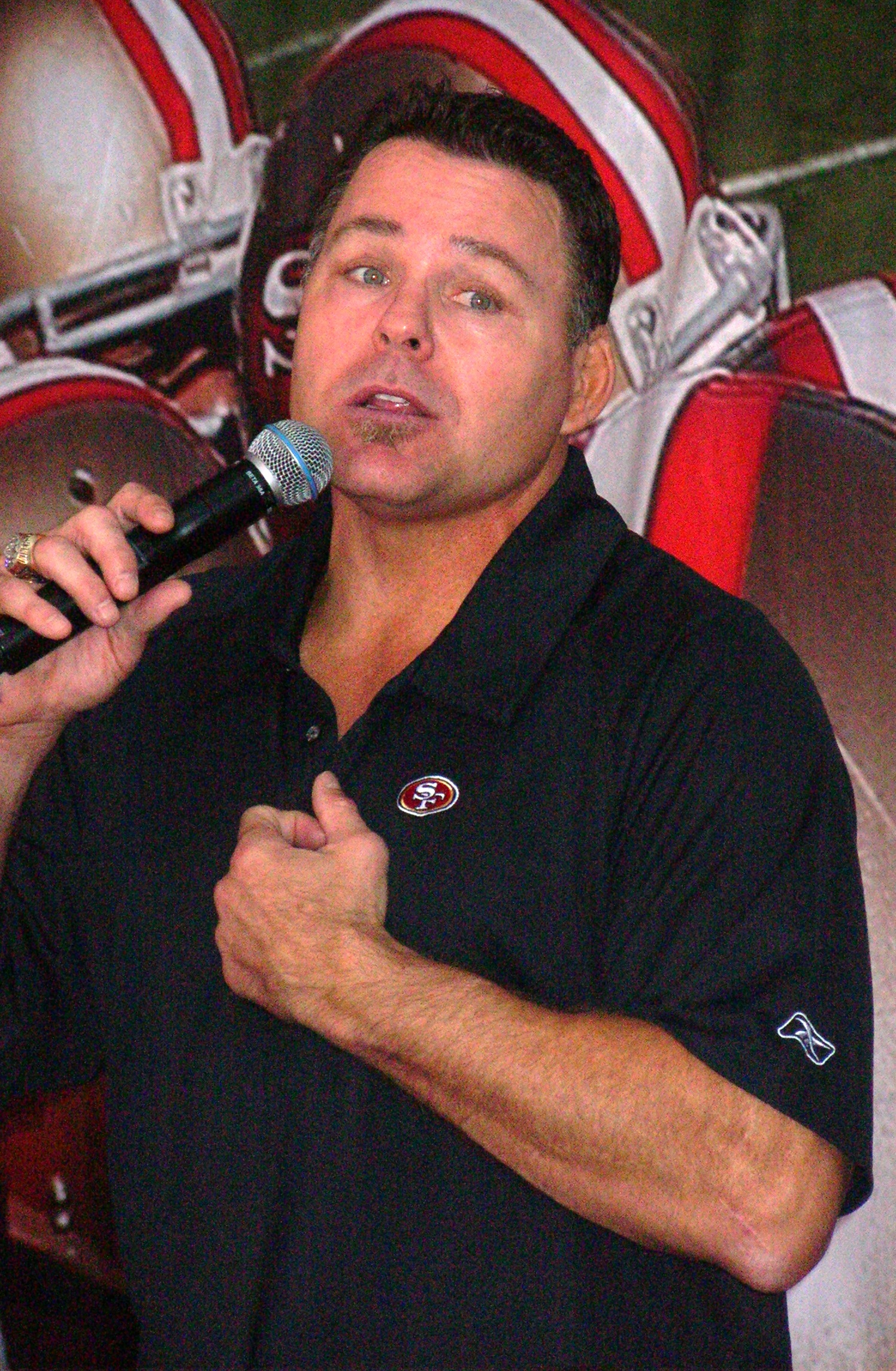
- Plummer in 2009

No. 51, 50
- Position: Linebacker

Personal information
- Born: January 26, 1960 (age 66); Fremont, California, U.S.
- Listed height: 6 ft 2 in (1.88 m)
- Listed weight: 240 lb (109 kg)

Career information
- High school: Mission San Jose (Fremont)
- College: California
- NFL draft: 1983: undrafted

Career history
- Oakland Invaders (1983-1985); San Diego Chargers (1986–1993); San Francisco 49ers (1994–1997)

Awards and highlights
- Super Bowl champion (XXIX)

Career NFL statistics
- Tackles: 1,029
- Interceptions: 6
- Sacks: 4.5
- Stats at Pro Football Reference

Gary Lee Plummer (born January 26, 1960) is an American former professional football player who was a linebacker in the National Football League (NFL) and the United States Football League (USFL). He played college football for the California Golden Bears. Plummer was signed by the San Diego Chargers as a free agent in 1986 after playing three years in the USFL. He won a Super Bowl with the San Francisco 49ers in Super Bowl XXIX.

== College career ==
Plummer played his first two years of junior-college football at Ohlone College, and then transferred to the University of California, Berkeley, where he played nose tackle for the Golden Bears.

== Professional playing career ==
=== Oakland Invaders ===
After going undrafted in the 1983 NFL draft, Plummer joined the Oakland Invaders of the USFL. He played three years for the team. He played in the 1985 USFL Championship game. He wore #51 with the Invaders.

=== San Diego Chargers ===
After the USFL folded in 1985, Plummer was signed by the San Diego Chargers. He became a starter during his first season with the Chargers and started 106 of 119 games during the eight seasons he played there. He finished his career with the Chargers with 792 tackles, 3.5 sacks, and five interceptions. He scored two touchdowns in his time with the Chargers. His first was a 2-yard pass from Billy Joe Tolliver on October 7, 1990, vs. Pittsburgh. His second came on a 1-yard run vs. Denver on November 11, 1990. While with the Chargers he carried the ball 3 times for 9 yards.

=== San Francisco 49ers ===
Before the 1994 season, Plummer signed with the San Francisco 49ers. He played his final four seasons of his career with the 49ers and was a member of the 49ers Super Bowl XXIX victory over the Chargers. After the 1997 season, Plummer retired with 1,029 tackles, 4.5 sacks, and six interceptions.

== Broadcasting career ==
From 1998 until April 2011, Plummer was a color analyst for KNBR 49ers game broadcasts. He also revealed that he suffered over 2500 concussions in the course of his career. Even when most of them were very mild Grade 1-type, he has been recovering from the cumulative effects.
