= KGMZ-FM =

Sports radio station in San Francisco

- San Francisco, California; United States
- Broadcast area: San Francisco Bay Area
- Frequency: 95.7 MHz (HD Radio)
- Branding: 95-7 The Game

Programming
- Format: Sports
- Affiliations: Fox Sports Radio; Bay Area Panthers; Golden State Warriors

Ownership
- Owner: Audacy, Inc.; (Audacy License, LLC)
- Sister stations: KCBS; KFRC-FM; KITS; KLLC; KRBQ

History
- First air date: June 1, 1960 (as KQBY-FM)
- Former call signs: KQBY-FM (1960–62); KKHI-FM (1962–1994); KPIX-FM (1994–1997); KOYT (1997); KZQZ (1997–2002); KKDV (2002–2003); KZBR (2003–2006); KMAX-FM (2006–2007); KBWF (2007–2011); KGMZ (2011–2018)
- Call sign meaning: "Game"

Technical information
- Licensing authority: FCC
- Facility ID: 25446
- Class: B
- ERP: 6,900 watts
- HAAT: 393 meters (1,289 ft)
- Transmitter coordinates: 37°41′22.7″N 122°26′15.8″W
- Repeater: See § FM Booster

Links
- Public license information: Public file; LMS
- Webcast: Listen live (via Audacy)
- Website: www.audacy.com/957thegame

KGMZ-FM (95.7 MHz, "95-7 The Game") is a sports radio station licensed to San Francisco, California, and serving the San Francisco Bay Area. The station is owned by Audacy, Inc., and broadcasts from studios on Battery Street (shared with CBS owned-and-operated station KPIX-TV, with whom KGMZ-FM's sister stations were formerly co-owned and located) in the North Beach section of San Francisco. KGMZ-FM serves as the flagship station for the Golden State Warriors basketball team. The station also broadcasts games of the Bay Area Panthers indoor football team.

KGMZ-FM currently broadcasts in HD.

== History ==
=== KQBY-FM and KKHI-FM (1960–1994) ===
The 95.7 FM frequency debuted June 1, 1960, as KQBY-FM, companion to co-owned KQBY 1550, with 10,500 watts from Mount Beacon above Sausalito, California. It was the last commercial FM application available in the San Francisco market. KQBY had been the original Top 40 music station in the Bay Area, garnering a huge market share for owner Dave Siegel. After competition eroded listeners, the station was sold to former child actor Sherwood R. Gordon, who changed the format to "beautiful music".

When Gordon ran out of money, both stations were sold to Frank Atlass, who financed the purchase from an inheritance. He changed the callsigns to KKHI and KKHI-FM and tried a middle of the road music format. When he ran low on money, the staff was cut to a bare minimum and the format was changed, this time to classical music. Debt problems forced Atlass to sell the stations in 1962.

New owner Buckley Broadcasting retained much of the staff and improved "The Classic Stations" format, attracting prestige-seeking advertisers. In 1968, because the FCC required co-owned/co-located AM and FM stations to have different programming for most of the day, automation equipment was installed for KKHI-FM, resulting in two stations operated by the same staff.

=== 95.7 KPIX-FM (1994–1997) ===
Labor disputes and declining advertising support eventually brought an end to the classical music programming. The station was sold in May 1994 to Westinghouse Broadcasting, owners of KPIX-TV, and its format was dramatically changed. The station became KPIX-FM, and changed to an news/talk format (with some smooth jazz music being played on weekends for a time) on May 30, while also simulcasting with its AM sister station. During this time, the station briefly attained an all-time ratings high by airing non-stop coverage of the O.J. Simpson murder trial. After the trial, in late 1995, the KPIX radio stations modified their format to news/talk as FM Talk 95.7 KPIX. Hosts included Don Imus, Dr. Laura Schlessinger, Tom Leykis, and Gil Gross.

=== Z95.7 (1997–2002) ===
In April 1997, Westinghouse, now a part of CBS Radio, sold KPIX-FM to Bonneville International (as part of an initial swap with eventual owner Entercom, who then spun the station off to Bonneville) due to being over FCC-mandated ownership limits as part of Westinghouse's merger with CBS (the AM would be retained by CBS). The talk format of KPIX-FM ended at 6 p.m. on May 30, 1997, following that day's broadcast of The Tom Leykis Show. The station then started stunting by simulcasting new sister station WTMX in Chicago for about a month. Following the stunt, the station flipped to an upbeat CHR format as Z95.7 on July 11 at 11:05 a.m., with the call letters KOYT and later KZQZ (which were adopted on July 21). The first song on the "Z" was "Get Ready For This" by 2 Unlimited. The slogan was "Today's Hit Music". KZQZ was an affiliate of the syndicated "Open House Party", which aired on weekends.

=== The Drive (2002–2003) ===
On May 7, 2002, the station changed its format to classic hits as KKDV ("95.7 The Drive"), inspired by the success of its Chicago sister station WDRV. The first song on "The Drive" was "Start Me Up" by The Rolling Stones.

=== 95.7 The Bear (2003–2005)/Max FM (2005–2007) ===
WDRV's success did not translate to the Bay Area, and on August 11, 2003, the station turned to a country music format as KZBR ("95.7 The Bear"). The first song on "The Bear" was "Gone Country" by Alan Jackson. On May 11, 2005, at Noon, the station adopted an adult hits format as "95.7 MAX-FM", with new KMAX call letters adopted on April 13, 2006. "Max" started with a full complement of announcers, but moved to a more-music, DJ-free approach in mid-April 2006. The familiar voice of "Station 'owner' J.J. Maxwell" or "Max" was actor John O'Hurley, perhaps best known for his work on Seinfeld as catalog king J. Peterman. "It's unexpected and a bit irreverent," said Bonneville's Senior Regional Vice President and general manager Chuck Tweedle. "And very much in the eclectic spirit of Max 95.7 FM."

In January 2007, Bonneville announced that it would be swapping all three of its San Francisco FM stations, including KMAX, plus $1 million, to Entercom Communications for three of Entercom's radio stations in Seattle, Washington, plus Entercom's entire radio cluster in Cincinnati, Ohio. Entercom took over the station through a local marketing agreement on February 26, 2007.

=== 95.7 The Wolf (2007–2011) ===
On February 28, 2007, at 12:30 pm, after playing Venus by Bananarama and going into a stopset, KMAX-FM began stunting with an automated voice similar to Microsoft Sam counting down to 7:50 a.m. the next morning, March 1, while occasionally giving quotes from movies, TV shows, songs, and pop culture references, as well as directing listeners to call numbers such as 415-777-7100 (the number for the San Francisco Chronicle's Metro Desk) or 415-954-7926 (the number for KGO-TV) for more information. The end of Max FM was notified beforehand with an e-mail sent out that morning to listeners, and shortly after 2 p.m. that day, Max's website went offline, replaced with a message thanking listeners, giving a brief goodbye message, and telling listeners that they were "preparing a brand new radio station that we believe you will like even more than Max", promoting that it would "be fun, energetic, Bay Area focused and unlike any other station in the area", promoting said format's launch at the time aforementioned, and ending by saying "we sincerely hope you join us for the ride."

At the promised time, KMAX returned to country as "95.7 The Wolf, The Bay Area's Fresh Country", launching with 10,000 songs in a row commercial-free, with the first song being "Save A Horse (Ride A Cowboy)" by Big & Rich. The launch of "The Wolf", and most of the initial imaging production was created by Krash Creative Solutions, and was also simulcast live from the main stage at the Country Radio Seminar in Nashville, being heard by hundreds of radio and record executives. On March 19, 2007, KMAX changed their call letters to KBWF to go with the "Wolf" branding.

After playing 10,000 songs in a row, they continued with an additional 15,000 songs still commercial-free. On April 2, 2007, The Wolf began adding jocks, with Nikki Landry doing mid-days, JoJo Kincaid on afternoons and the Nite Wolf with Mark "Tic Tak" Allen on nights. On April 16, 2007, The Wolf brought in The Y'all Turnative Morning Show with Gill Alexander, LeBaron Meyers, Marcus Osborne, Sue Hall and Eddie King.

KBWF became the flagship station of the Oakland Athletics baseball team, replacing KTRB, on March 31, 2011. The first game broadcast was on April 1, 2011.

=== Sports Radio 95.7/95.7 The Game (2011–present) ===
On April 15, 2011, at 10 am, after playing "Heads Carolina, Tails California" by Jo Dee Messina, KBWF began stunting with a montage of various San Francisco sports highlights of the last few decades, as well as songs typically played at sporting events.

At 4 p.m. that day, the new "SportsRadio 95.7" soft-launched with the Oakland Athletics' pre-game show with Chris Townsend and the game following. After the game, the station resumed stunting, which lasted until the following Monday morning at 6 am, when SportsRadio 95.7 made its official debut. The flip came after the station became the new FM affiliate for the A's.

On August 1, 2011, at 6 am, the station relaunched as "95.7 The Game", completing the flip to sports with a new official on-air lineup. The station also changed their calls to KGMZ to go with the "Game" moniker.

On January 1, 2016, KGMZ switched its national network affiliation from ESPN Radio to Fox Sports Radio. By July 2016, KTCT became the Bay Area's ESPN Radio affiliate. Three days before Christmas that year, KGMZ signed a contract with the University of San Francisco (USF) to broadcast nine San Francisco Dons men's basketball games that season. KGMZ and USF renewed their contract in 2017.

On April 5, 2016, the Oakland Raiders announced that KGMZ would be their new flagship station for the team. On August 25, 2016, the Golden State Warriors announced that KGMZ would be their new flagship station for the team, moving all of their game broadcasts and pre-game and post-game shows from KNBR.

The call letters were modified to KGMZ-FM on May 1, 2018, after the station resumed simulcasting on 1550 AM, which took the KGMZ call sign. The AM station broke away from the simulcast to air Oakland Athletics games that conflicted with Golden State Warriors games. Additionally, for the 2018–19 season, USF Dons men's basketball broadcasts moved to KGMZ-AM, with KGMZ-FM simulcasting two games.

In July 2018, the Raiders announced that KGMZ-FM would no longer be the team's flagship station, and was replaced by sister station KCBS for the final two seasons before the Raiders' relocation to Las Vegas. KGMZ-FM continued to broadcast select Raiders games via simulcast. In October 2018, the Athletics announced that KGMZ-FM would no longer be the team's flagship station; the A's aired on KTRB in 2019. Also in 2019, KGMZ dropped USF Dons basketball, whose games moved to KTCT.

== Booster ==
KGMZ-FM is rebroadcast on the following FM Booster:

Call sign	Frequency	City of license	FID	ERP (W)	HAAT	Class	FCC info
KGMZ-FM2	95.7 FM	Walnut Creek, California	25447	186 (Vert.)	926 m (3,038 ft)	D	LMS

== Notable staff ==
- Don Imus (Morning Host Imus in the Morning 1994–1997)
- Dr. Laura Schlessinger (Midday Host 1994–1997)
- Gil Gross (Nighttime Host, syndicated, later with KKSF-910)
- Tom Leykis (Afternoon Host The Tom Leykis Show 1994–1997)
- Eric Davis (Afternoons The Drive host 2011–2012) - Now host of NFL AM at NFL Network
- Lorenzo Neal (Mornings with Chad, Joe & Lo co-host 2014–present, Mornings with Joe, Lo & Dibs co-host 2016–2020)
- Tim Roye (Golden State Warriors play-by-play commentator 2016–present) - Roye has called Warriors games on the radio since 1995
- Matt Steinmetz (Steiny, Guru & Dibs co-host 2019–2022, Steiny & Guru co-host 2022–present)
- Damon Bruce (The Damon Bruce Show host 2014–2019, Damon, Ratto & Kolsky co-host 2019–2022, Damon & Ratto co-host 2022–2023)
- Ray Ratto (Damon, Ratto & Kolsky co-host 2019–2022, Damon & Ratto co-host 2022–2023)
