= Tim Roye =

American radio play-by-play announcer

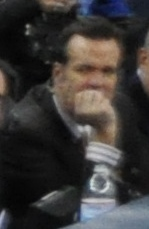
- Education: Utica College
- Occupation: Radio play-by-play announcer for Golden State Warriors
- Years active: 1981–present

Timothy James Roye is an American radio play-by-play announcer for the NBA's Golden State Warriors. Prior to joining the Warriors, he had worked in radio in Utica, Birmingham, Phoenix, and Sacramento, with occupations from play-by-play announcing to hosting radio shows and being a sports radio director. He has been calling Warrior games for over 20 seasons and is currently heard on 95.7 The Game, an FM station in the San Francisco Bay Area.

== Early life and education ==
Roye is a native of Chula Vista, California. He attended Utica College in New York and graduated with a bachelor's degree in public relations and journalism in 1981. While in college, in 1978, Roye started as the sports director for Utica's WIBX/WNYZ. As sports director, he hosted sports talk shows, did play-by-play for area sports, and called the Utica Boilermaker Road Race. He held this position until 1986.

In 2013, Roye was inducted into Utica College's Pioneer Hall of Fame.

== Career ==
In 1986 Roye moved to Birmingham, Alabama and was the sports director at WVOK radio as well as the voice for the University of Alabama at Birmingham men's basketball team. In 1987, he moved to Phoenix where he had a talk show on KTAR radio, worked as a correspondent on the radio for the Arizona Cardinals, covered Arizona State basketball and baseball, and the Phoenix Firebirds minor league baseball team.

In 1989 he joined the Sacramento Kings’ broadcast team, handling radio broadcasts on KHTK-AM and KFBK-AM. He was a sports director for KFBK for five of the six seasons, and later hosted a daily sports talk show on KHTK as well a two-hour weekly Kings program. Besides covering the Kings, Roye covered other local sports teams on radio and television including the Sacramento Gold Miners of the Canadian Football League and the Sacramento State sports teams.

In 1995, Roye joined the Golden State Warriors' broadcast team where he did play-by-play for the Warriors on KNBR (680 AM & 1050 AM), the club's flagship station. In addition to covering the Warriors games, he hosted a weekly one-hour show called "Warriors Weekly Roundtable", where he interviewed guests, take calls, and preview the upcoming opponent. He also reads emails sent to Tim Roye's Journal. On occasion, he has filled in as an interim talk show host for KNBR as well as do play-by-play for the Warriors television broadcasts.

For the 2016–17 season, when the Warriors changed radio stations from KNBR to 95.7 The Game, Roye stayed as the play-by-play announcer for the team.

In 2022, Roye called Stanford football games on KTCT.

=== Catchphrases ===
- "Elevation Sensation": When a player leaps very high and dunks it down, often posterizing another player. Named after a dunk by Jason Richardson.
- "Air France": referring to Mickaël Piétrus.
- "Un-be-lievable": When a player makes an incredible play or shot.

=== Notable calls ===
Roye was on the call for game 6 of the 2015 NBA Finals, when the Warriors defeated the Cleveland Cavaliers to win their first NBA championship since 1975

It's taken 40 years, but once again, the Bay's team is the best team! The Golden State Warriors have won the NBA title!

== Personal life ==
Tim lives in Fairfield, California with his wife, Cinde, and their two children, Zachary James and Gabby.

== See also ==
- KNBR (AM)
- Golden State Warriors
