= KUNK =

FM radio station broadcasting in Fort Bragg, California (U.S.) on 92.7 MHz

- Mendocino, California; United States
- Broadcast area: Mendocino County, California
- Frequency: 105.1 MHz
- Branding: The Skunk FM

Programming
- Format: Adult contemporary
- Affiliations: CBS News Radio; Golden State Warriors; San Francisco 49ers; San Francisco Giants

Ownership
- Owner: Rubin Broadcasting, Inc.
- Sister stations: KTOX

History
- First air date: November 1966
- Former call signs: KMFB (1966–2011)
- Former frequencies: 92.7 MHz (1966-2026)
- Call sign meaning: "Skunk"

Technical information
- Licensing authority: FCC
- Facility ID: 31595
- Class: A
- ERP: 100 watts
- HAAT: 30 meters (98 ft)
- Transmitter coordinates: 39.465°N 123.759°W
- Translator: 96.7 K244AH (Ukiah)

Links
- Public license information: Public file; LMS
- Webcast: Listen live
- Website: theskunkfm.com

KUNK (105.1 FM, "The Skunk FM') is an American radio station broadcasting an adult contemporary format. Licensed to Mendocino, California, United States, the station serves the Fort Bragg-Ukiah area. The station signed on as KMFB in November 1966.

In August 2011, the station was sold to Hooten Broadcasting, LLC. KMFB changed their call letters to KUNK on October 11, 2011.

Effective December 16, 2016, Hooten Broadcasting sold KUNK to Rubin Broadcasting, Inc. for $275,000.
