= KNBR-FM =

Radio station in San Francisco

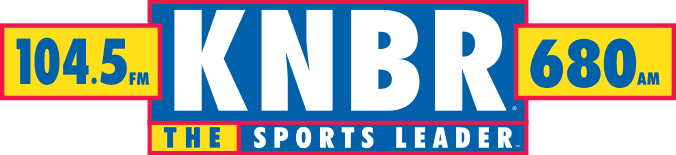
- San Francisco, California; United States
- Broadcast area: San Francisco-Oakland-San Jose
- Frequency: 104.5 MHz
- Branding: The Sports Leader

Programming
- Format: Sports
- Network: Westwood One Sports
- Affiliations: San Francisco 49ers Radio Network; San Francisco Giants Radio Network; Sports USA Radio Network; Westwood One Sports

Ownership
- Owner: Cumulus Media Inc.; (Radio License Holding SRC LLC)
- Sister stations: KNBR; KSAN; KSFO; KTCT

History
- First air date: February 4, 1960
- Former call signs: KBAY-FM (1960–1963); KFOG (1963–2019)
- Call sign meaning: carried over from KNBR, once owned by NBC

Technical information
- Licensing authority: FCC
- Facility ID: 54770
- Class: B
- ERP: 7,100 watts
- HAAT: 459 meters (1,506 ft)
- Transmitter coordinates: 37.755°N 122.453°W
- Repeater: See § Booster

Links
- Public license information: Public file; LMS
- Webcast: Listen live; Listen live; Listen live (via iHeartRadio)
- Website: www.thesportsleader.com

KNBR-FM (104.5 MHz) is a commercial radio radio station licensed to San Francisco, California, serving the greater San Francisco Bay Area. Owned by Cumulus Media, KNBR-FM features a sports radio format in a simulcast with co-owned KNBR. Both stations are the San Francisco affiliates for Westwood One Sports, the flagship stations for the San Francisco Giants Radio Network and co-flagship stations for the San Francisco 49ers Radio Network (along with KSAN and KSFO). KNBR-AM-FM are the radio home of Greg Papa and Tom Tolbert.

KNBR maintains studios in Daly City, California, while the transmitter is located on Mount Sutro. In addition to a standard analog transmission, KNBR simulcasts over low-power analog Pleasanton booster KNBR-FM3 (104.5 FM), and is available online.

== History ==
=== Beautiful music ===
The station signed on the air on February 4, 1960, as KBAY-FM. It was owned by Kaiser Broadcasting, a company started by local industrialist Henry J. Kaiser. It aired a "good music" format, mostly instrumental easy listening with some middle of the road songs and soft pop vocals.

In 1963, the call sign switched to KFOG in honor of the city's fog layer, and the station aired a beautiful music format, again largely instrumental music, cover versions of popular songs with some Broadway and Hollywood show tunes. Within a few years, KFOG got competition from other beautiful music stations: KABL-AM-FM (now KNEW and KISQ) and from KOIT, as well as San Jose-based KBAY (now KBRG). By the early 1980s, the format was declining in popularity. KFOG was acquired by General Electric in 1974.

=== "Timeless Rock" ===
On September 16, 1982, with studios still at Ghirardelli Square, KFOG dropped the easy listening format for a blend of album-oriented rock (AOR) and classic rock, which the station called "Timeless Rock". The first song on the new format was "Rock This Town" by The Stray Cats. The station featured a wide range of music, from the psychedelic sounds of the Grateful Dead and Jefferson Airplane to newer artists such as Prince, the Eurythmics, and the Thompson Twins.

KFOG avoided commercial-sounding bands such as Loverboy and REO Speedwagon, which were widely played on more mass-appeal AOR stations at the time. KFOG was inspired by San Francisco's freeform rock radio heritage, dating back to KSAN, a pioneering progressive rock station (now KYLD).

A variation of KFOG's original logo

Logo, 2006-2016

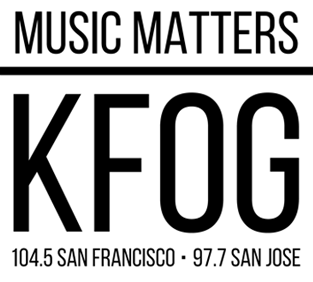
Logo used from 2016 to 2019

When KFOG changed to rock in the early 1980s, the Bay Area already had numerous competing rock stations; KMEL was the established, tightly-formatted AOR station that had been playing rock music since 1977. KRQR was the hard rock station and KQAK was a new station with a friendly, loosely programmed, personality-driven alternative rock/new wave format. There were two other rock stations in the South Bay - KSJO and KOME. One other San Francisco rock station, KSFX, switched to talk radio in May of that year. Of the six Bay Area rock stations that were on the air in late 1982, KFOG had been the last of the heritage rock stations.

In 1989, KFOG was acquired by the Susquehanna Radio Corporation, along with KNBR, for $17.5 million after General Electric's acquisition of NBC and departure from radio. Susquehanna later merged into Cumulus Media, the current owner.

=== AAA and alternative rock ===
The station evolved over the years, but KFOG aired an eclectic rock format for more than a quarter century. In the 1990s, it adjusted its playlist to an adult album alternative (AAA) direction. In August 1995, it became "KFOG 97.7 and 104.5", when Susquehanna acquired San Jose station KHQT (97.7 FM) and turned it into KFFG, simulcasting KFOG on a full-time basis.

On March 31, 2016, KFOG took all of its DJs off the air and began promoting an "evolution" to take place on April 20. On that day, at 6 a.m., KFOG relaunched its AAA format under the new slogan "Music Matters", and shifted its playlist to focus on songs from the 1990s to the present day. The first song under the "Music Matters" branding was "Times Like These" by Foo Fighters.

As part of the change, former New York City rock DJ Bryan Schock was hired as Operations Manager/Program Director for KFOG and classic rock sister station KSAN. Most of the KFOG airstaff, including morning hosts Irish Greg McQuade and Renee Richardson, midday host Annalisa, afternoon host Bill Webster, night host Dred Scott, and weekend host Rosalie Howarth, were let go from the station. By 2018, the station gradually transitioned to a more mainstream alternative format. It then directly competed with KITS.

At 9:00 p.m. on May 31, 2019, KFOG slightly re-branded as "KFOG 104.5", as KFFG was sold off to EMF and became K-Love affiliate KJLV; the station adopted a new logo to reflect the sale of the repeater. The last song before the simulcast broke was "High Hopes" by Panic! At The Disco."First Day Of Rock & The End Of KFOG-FM San Francisco, CA September 16, 1982/September 5, 2019 (Unscoped)".

=== Switch to KNBR-FM ===
On August 26, 2019, Cumulus announced that KFOG would drop its rock format on September 6 to simulcast sister station KNBR.

On its final day as a music station, starting at 6 a.m., KFOG aired a tribute to its long run as a rock station with a day-long marathon of old "10@10" broadcasts and recordings taken from the station's "Live From the Archives" CD series. The exception was the 8 a.m. hour, a repeat of Dave Morey's final morning show before his retirement in 2008, and the 5 p.m. hour, in which KFOG paid tribute to longtime DJ Mike 'M Dung' Slavko's Sunday night freeform radio program "The Idiot Show". In addition, the station identifications for that day were taken from the pre-1982 beautiful music format.

In the station's final hour as KFOG, they rebroadcast the audio of its 1982 flip to AAA, followed by a "10@10" broadcast of "666 - Day of Doom Devil Music" which originally aired June 6, 2006, and ended with a short set of songs, finishing with "Brokedown Palace" by the Grateful Dead. After a final sign-off consisting of an eight-minute-long loop of ocean wave, seagull, and foghorn sound effects that were the station's longtime audio trademark, and a minute of silence, KFOG officially flipped to the simulcast. There was no official acknowledgement on-air when the station made the switch; rather, the station joined during a rebroadcast of that night's San Francisco Giants game already in progress. On the same day, the call sign KNBR-FM was adopted; the KFOG call letters have since been warehoused on an AM station in Little Rock, Arkansas, the former KPZK.

== Booster ==
The station is rebroadcast on the following FM booster:

Call sign	Frequency	City of license	FID	ERP (W)	HAAT	Class	FCC info
KNBR-FM3	104.5 FM	Pleasanton, California	54773	185 (Horiz.)	922.41 m (3,026 ft)	D	LMS

== HD Radio ==
As KFOG, it broadcast two feeds in HD Radio, the first was a simulcast of the analog feed and the second carried "All-10@10-All-The-Time". The HD2 feed was taken off air in 2015. The HD1 feed returned when the station became KNBR-FM. It has since been turned off.
