= Ray Ratto =

American sportswriter

- Occupations: Sports journalist, columnist

Ray Ratto has been a San Francisco Bay Area sportswriter since the 1970s and a sports columnist since the 1980s.

A lifelong resident of Alameda, California, Ratto was a Senior Insider for the TV station NBC Sports Bay Area (formerly Comcast Sportsnet Bay Area) from 2010 to 2019, and wrote columns for their website. He has also written national columns for espn.com as well as CBS' sportsline.com.

Beginning his column-writing career for two now-defunct newspapers, The National and the Peninsula Times Tribune, Ratto later became a staff writer then a columnist for the San Francisco Examiner and then the San Francisco Chronicle before moving to TV. He has also co-hosted radio shows on both KNBR and KGMZ-FM. Ratto was a regular on the NBC Sports Bay Area show "The Happy Hour" before his termination from NBCSBA in late 2018. In 2019 he was a contributor at Deadspin and wrote columns for the San Jose Mercury News. Ratto is one of 60 sportswriters whose ranking of college football teams makes up the AP Poll. He is also a member of the Baseball Writers' Association of America and a voter for the annual election of members to the Baseball Hall of Fame.

Ratto is a staff writer for Defector, a site started by former Deadspin staffers after that site’s mass resignations in 2019.
