= KNBR (AM) =

Sports radio station in San Francisco

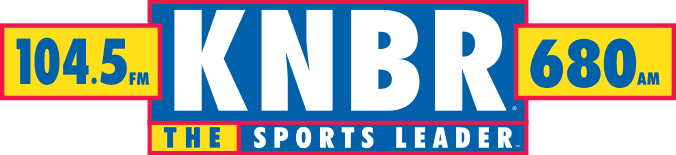
- San Francisco, California; United States
- Broadcast area: San Francisco Bay Area
- Frequency: 680 kHz
- Branding: KNBR 680 and 104.5 The Sports Leader

Programming
- Format: Sports
- Affiliations: San Francisco 49ers Radio Network; San Francisco Giants Radio Network; Sports USA Radio Network; Westwood One Sports

Ownership
- Owner: Cumulus Media Inc.; (Radio License Holding SRC LLC)
- Sister stations: KNBR-FM; KSAN; KSFO; KTCT

History
- First air date: April 17, 1922
- Former call signs: KPO (1922–1946); KNBC (1946–1962)
- Call sign meaning: National Broadcasting Radio (a reference to former owner NBC)

Technical information
- Licensing authority: FCC
- Facility ID: 35208
- Class: A
- Power: 50,000 watts unlimited
- Transmitter coordinates: 37°32′49.8″N 122°14′3.9″W (main) 37°32′49.8″N 122°13′57.9″W (aux)
- Repeater: 104.5 KNBR-FM (San Francisco)

Links
- Public license information: Public file; LMS
- Webcast: Listen live; Listen live (via iHeartRadio)
- Website: www.thesportsleader.com

KNBR (680 kHz, "KNBR 680 and 104.5 The Sports Leader") is an AM radio station in San Francisco, California, broadcasting on a clear channel from transmitting facilities in Redwood City, California. KNBR's non-directional 50,000-watt class-A signal can be heard throughout much of the western United States and as far west as the Hawaiian Islands at night. For several decades, KNBR enjoyed a long history as the flagship station of NBC's West Coast radio operations. KNBR and KTCT are owned by Cumulus Media Partners, LLC, a private partnership of Cumulus Media, Bain Capital, The Blackstone Group, and Thomas H. Lee Partners. It was purchased from Susquehanna Pfaltzgraff in 2005 along with other Susquehanna Radio Corporation stations.

Two other stations also use the KNBR brand. KNBR-FM (104.5 FM) in San Francisco has been a full-time simulcast of KNBR's programming since September 6, 2019. KTCT (1050 kHz) is licensed to San Mateo, California, with a transmitter located near Hayward, California. It carried a separate sports format known as The Ticket but was rebranded as a second KNBR in 2003. The Sports Leader is the on-air branding used by all three stations. KNBR maintains its studios at 2001 Junipero Serra Blvd in Daly City, California.

Between the three stations, games of the San Francisco Giants, San Francisco 49ers, Bay Area Panthers and Stanford Cardinal are broadcast to the San Francisco Bay Area. KTCT was available in the HD format on 1050 kHz but has been broadcasting in analog. In addition, KNBR was simulcast on the HD2 subchannel of KSAN in nearby San Mateo.

== Programming ==
On KNBR, weekday programming consists of the following blocks, which are preempted or moved to KTCT when there are regularly scheduled sports events. The morning shows include Murph and Markus (Brian Murphy and Markus Boucher) Papa and Silver (Greg Papa and Greg Silver). The afternoon show is Dirty Work (Derek Papa and Adam Copeland). The evening show is Sportsphone KNBR (Multiple hosts). Late night programming on days when no games are being replayed is filled in by hosts featured on Westwood One Sports.

Weekend programs include Commonwealth Club, Hooked on Golf, Protect Your Assets with David Hollander, Sports Saloon, At the Track, Gary Allen on Business, and assorted Westwood One Sports programming.

On KTCT, weekday programming consists of the ESPN Radio network schedule, other than the first 3 hours of Freddie and Harry, which is not aired in favour of The Jim Rome Show. Weekend programs include Mortgage Makeover and various ESPN programming. Commonwealth Club is presented early Sunday mornings.

Framing the various San Francisco Giants events, Marty Lurie fills in as a host of SportsPhone 680 Giants Warm-Up shows on KNBR every weekend during the baseball season.

=== Sports ===
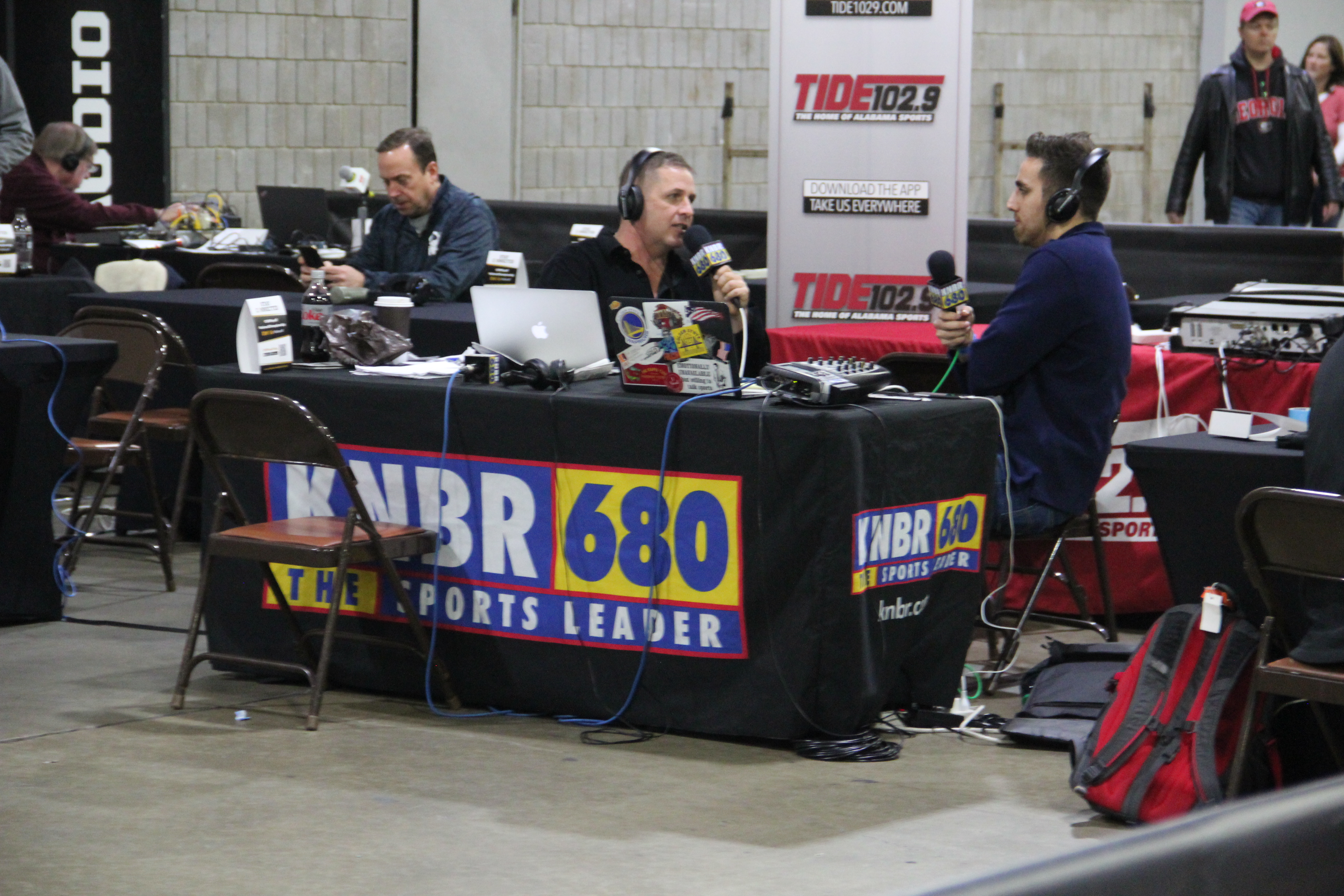
KNBR anchors at the Georgia World Congress Center for the 2018 College Football Playoff National Championship

KNBR and KTCT are charter affiliates of CBS Sports Radio, (now Westwood One Sports) a joint venture between CBS Radio and Cumulus, which started on January 2, 2013. ESPN Radio is also carried on KTCT. KNBR has been the radio home of the San Francisco Giants since 1979 (taking over from KSFO). Play-by-play is done by Jon Miller and Dave Flemming. Miller and Flemming are frequently joined by Giants television broadcasters Mike Krukow and Duane Kuiper. The four announcers often share radio and TV broadcasting duties during a game. Marty Lurie continues to host the Giants pre-game show on weekends.

Tim Roye was the radio play-by-play announcer for the Golden State Warriors, and was occasionally joined by Jim Barnett on non-televised games as Barnett serves as an analyst for TV broadcasts. On August 25, 2016, the Warriors announced they have ended their partnership with KNBR and signed with KGMZ-FM. The partnership with KNBR lasted 40 years, including 32 consecutive years.

The station has long been a home for arena and indoor football. A vast array of announcers participated in San Jose SaberCats broadcasts, including Tim Roye, Bob Fitzgerald, Ray Woodson, Keena Turner, George Atkinson, and Troy Clardy. In 2020, KNBR via KTCT began to broadcast games of the Bay Area Panthers. Scott Reiss is the voice of the Panthers.

In 2005, KNBR became the official radio home of the San Francisco 49ers. All games are also heard on sister station KSAN; some AM broadcasts may be moved to KTCT due to conflicts with Giants games. 49ers games were broadcast by Joe Starkey and Gary Plummer for four seasons until Starkey's retirement following the 2008 season. In the 2009 season, former Giants baseball and world-class tennis announcer Ted Robinson took over for Starkey as the play-by-play announcer. Greg Papa and Tim Ryan currently call 49er games on KNBR.

== History ==
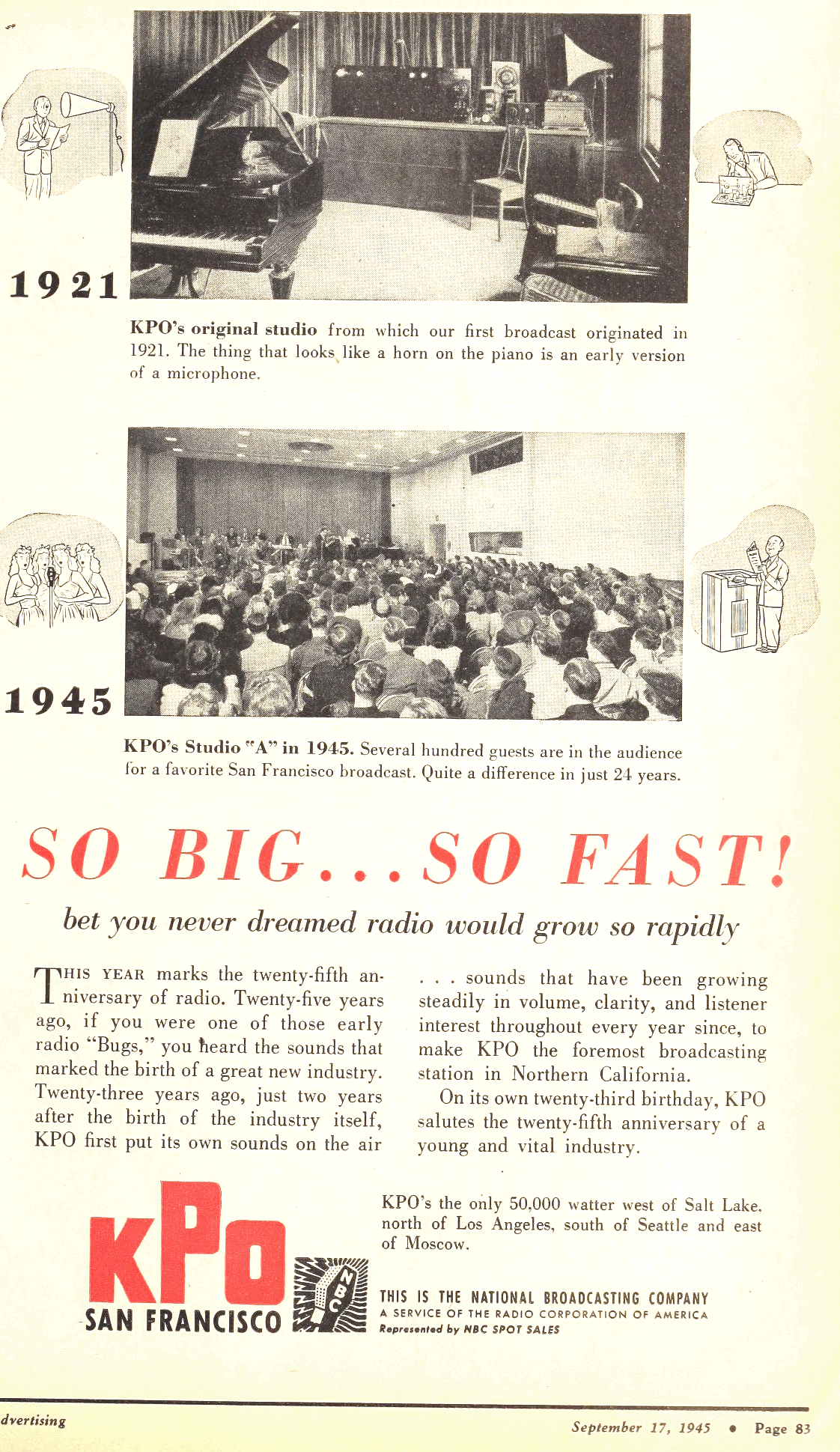
1945 advertisement as KPO

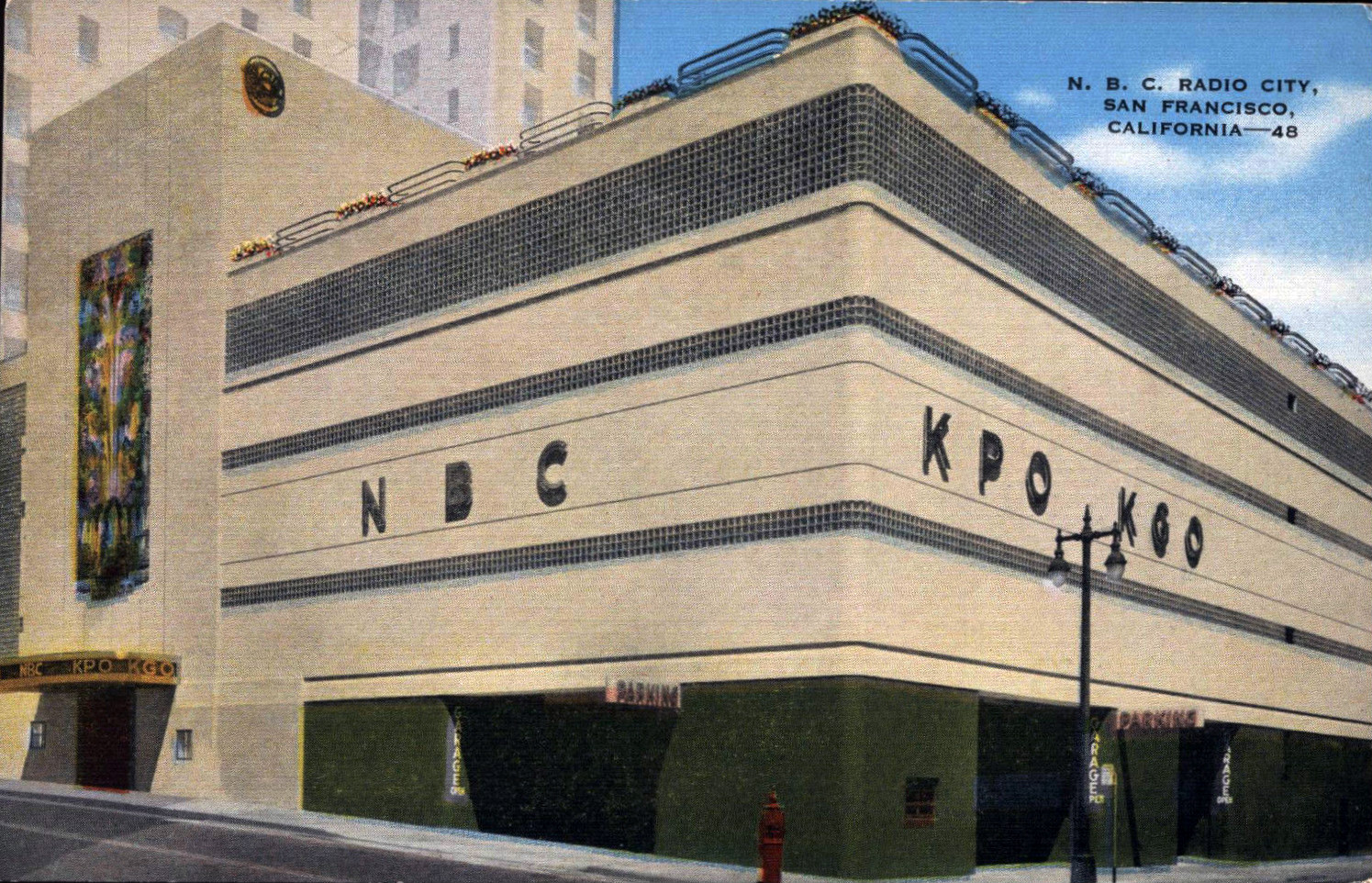
KPO and KGO building in the 1940s.

KNBR began broadcasting on April 17, 1922, as KPO, a 100-watt station owned by the Hale Brothers Department Store. In 1925, the San Francisco Chronicle newspaper bought half-interest in the operation. It originally was located in the department store at 901 Market between 5th and 6th. It had a horizontal wire antenna on the roof that was so efficient, the station had listeners all over the Pacific Coast.

In 1927, KPO became an affiliate of NBC. A year earlier, NBC started the NBC Orange Network, its third network, serving the West Coast. In 1927, NBC began broadcasting from space rented in the Saint Francis Hotel. It operated there for a short time before moving to the Hunter–Dulin Building's 22nd floor. On November 11, 1928, under the provisions of the Federal Radio Commission's General Order 40, the station was assigned to the "clear channel" frequency of 680 kHz, where it has stayed ever since.

In 1933, KPO was sold to NBC's parent company, the Radio Corporation of America (RCA). Its operation was consolidated with co-owned KGO at the Hunter-Dulin Building. That same year, KPO increased its transmitter power to 50,000 watts following transmitter reconstruction by General Electric. From there, NBC operated its West Coast Orange Network, feeding dozens of stations and operating a news bureau to serve NBC. As NBC's flagship station on the West Coast, KPO had a full-time orchestra, five studios, and produced many live shows. During the rise of Hollywood, NBC's West Coast operation was moved to NBC Radio City Hollywood.

In 1941, just before World War II, NBC constructed NBC Radio City San Francisco at 420 Taylor Street. It was considered one of the best radio facilities built during the "Golden Age of Radio". However, with the network control having been moved to Los Angeles, the San Francisco NBC building was never fully used. (Later, the building housed KBHK-TV and has since been the headquarters of Reddit and Nextdoor.)

During World War II, KPO's news bureau was the major source of NBC news about the war in the Pacific, and operated shortwave radio stations (transmitters located in Dixon) serving the world. It was at the KPO (RCA) shortwave facility that the message was received that Japanese emperor Hirohito had surrendered, ending World War II.

On November 23, 1947, NBC changed KPO's call sign to KNBC, to strengthen its identity as an NBC station (and the only radio station NBC ever owned on the West Coast). This change lasted until fifteen years later, when the network decided to move the KNBC identity to its television station in Los Angeles. NBC had asked the FCC to restore the KPO call letters to the San Francisco radio station but later withdrew that request and 680 AM was renamed KNBR on November 11, 1962.

In November 1949, NBC television affiliate KRON-TV went on the air. Only before the TV station's first airdate did NBC fight for the construction permit for the TV station until it lost the bid to the de Young family, then the owners of the San Francisco Chronicle.

In the 1950s when NBC scrapped its radio comedy, drama, variety shows, and serials, the Los Angeles facility was sold and demolished, and KNBC/KNBR once again became the West Coast NBC network control center and West Coast NBC Radio news operation.

KNBR evolved into a middle of the road music format mixing in adult standards with soft rock cuts by the early 1960s artists with Ron Fell as program director and LaVerne Drake as music director (1971-early 1975). Heber Smith was the general manager, John Cameron as Chief Engineer and Bill Dwyer was sales manager. The station continued to be a news-intensive format with personalities in the foreground and music in the background. Personalities included Frank Dill, Mike Cleary, Les Williams, Dave Niles, and Jack Hayes. KNBR was located in Fox Plaza near the City Hall area in the early 1970s. Until January 1975, KNBR carried NBC's long-running weekend show, Monitor. By the mid-1970s, KNBR evolved musically into a straight-ahead adult contemporary music format and continued as such into the 1980s. KNBR programming included sports from the Oakland Athletics, San Francisco Giants (1978), Golden State Warriors and Oakland Raiders after the evening drive time was over. Wednesday nights, Scotty Stirling, Golden State Warriors team executive, hosted a call-in remote from the Carnelian Room at the Bank of America building.

In the mid-1970s the station moved to the Embarcadero area. Allan Hotlen became program director in 1975. He was followed in that job by Ron Reynolds, who had been music director and talent under Holten. When Ron Reynolds moved to KYUU, NBC's San Francisco FM outlet, Scott Burton came to KNBR as program director. Ron Lyons, C.J. Bronson and Tom Brown became part of the on-air personality staff during the mid to late 1970s. By the late 1970s, KNBR was all music with the exception of sports games.

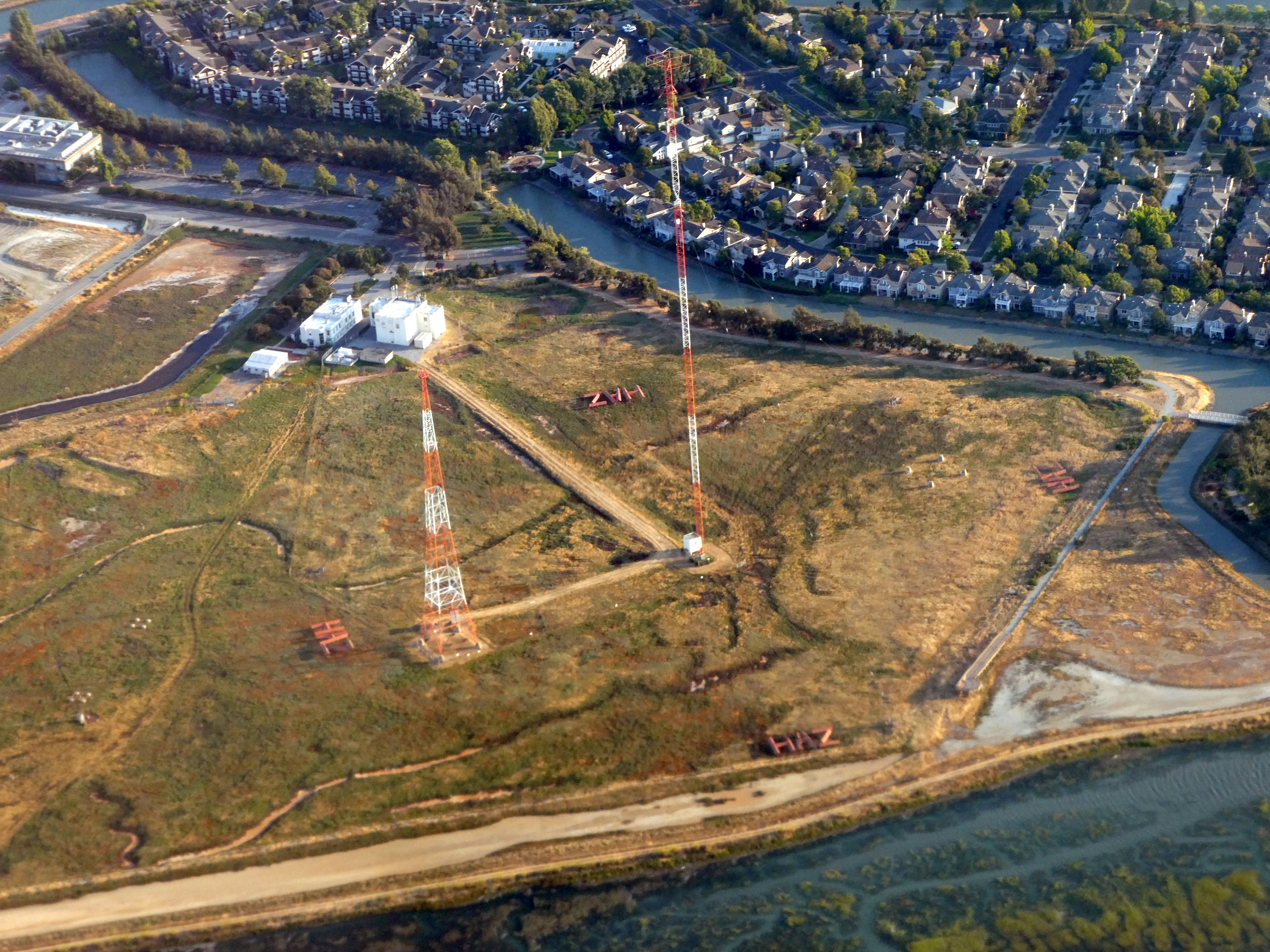
KNBR transmitters in Redwood City

Isabelle Lemon, KNBR's promotion director in the 1970s, is credited with creating the "KNBR 68" logo using the California's car license plates as a model in the mid-1970s. The license plate idea was copied as well during the 1970s and 1980s. It was used on bumper stickers, t-shirts and many other promotional items. The logo was used into the 1990s, well over 20 years.

KNBR remained a full service news station as well. Gene D'Accardo was news director with Ed Brady, Gill Haar, Robert "Bob" Lazich, Jim Beaver, as part of the news team. NBC network news would be followed by local segments.

A holiday format for Christmas holidays was developed written and produced by the station's assistant program director, Bryan Eaton, in the late 1970s. Discussions of actual holiday facts were produced by various air personalities (backed by sounds of a crackling fire as they made cracks about the KNBR fireplace). These were bumpers to sets of holiday music. The production ran on tape for 24 hours. It was updated in the mid-1980s by Larry Finkel, who was music director at that time.

A short-lived, weekend overnight-only format playing disco and occasional overnight album cuts varied the format keeping in step with changing times.

In 1979, KNBR was awarded the Billboard Adult Contemporary Station of The Year under GM Bill Dwyer. Scott Burton was program director and Bryan Eaton was music director. Jane Morrison and Gimmy Park Li were the community affairs arm of KNBR. Isabelle Lemon was promotions director.

In March 1989, NBC sold KNBR to Susquehanna Radio Corporation; it was the last radio property held by NBC, which two years earlier made the decision to sell off its radio division following General Electric's 1986 acquisition of RCA. The station soon added some sports talk in evenings, and took a full-time sports format in 1990 with the lone exception of The Rush Limbaugh Show, which KNBR carried from 1988 until 2000.

KNBR formerly served as the primary entry point station of the Bay Area's Emergency Broadcast System (EBS), but lost the designation in 1990 after major technical malfunctions by the station's engineers during the 1989 Loma Prieta earthquake. The Federal Communications Commission investigated the issue that the EBS designation was "revoked". KCBS then assumed the role as the originator for the EBS, and the successor Emergency Alert System.

KNBR carried programs from ESPN Radio and KTCT aired shows from both ESPN Radio and Fox Sports Radio until 2013 when both stations switched to the Cumulus-distributed CBS Sports Radio.

In 2015, KNBR's studios were relocated from 55 Hawthorne Street to 750 Battery Street after parent Cumulus Media consolidated its San Francisco radio stations in one building.

KNBR added an FM simulcast on KNBR-FM 104.5 on September 6, 2019.

In November 2024, KNBR announced that it would relocate from Battery Street to studios at Levi's Stadium. This did not prove to be the case, although it still broadcasts San Francisco 49ers-related programming from the venue. Instead, Cumulus announced in January 2025 that it would sublease Bonneville International's facility in Daly City for its Bay Area cluster. KNBR relocated to Daly City on May 29, 2025, marking the first time the station had been based from a studio outside of San Francisco in its 103-year existence.

KNBR had also maintained a secondary studio at Oracle Park dubbed "The Bunker" until July 2025, which was situated at its field club level, and was occasionally used for Giants-related coverage. In July 2025, afternoon host Adam Copeland revealed that the team wouldn't allow the station to use the space anymore.

== Former hosts and personalities ==
- Ralph Barbieri
- Rick Barry
- C.J. Bronson
- Rod Brooks
- Damon Bruce
- Mike Cleary
- Peter B. Collins
- Ryan Covay
- Frank Dill
- Ken Dito
- Scott Ferrall
- Pete Franklin
- Bob Fitzgerald
- Kevin Frandsen
- Hank Greenwald
- Rich Herrera
- Steve Jamison
- Leo Laporte
- Tom Tolbert
- John Lund
- Bob Lazich
- John London
- Steve McPartlin
- Dave Newhouse
- Kevin Radich
- Gary Radnich
- Ray Ratto
- Tim Roye
- F. P. Santangelo
- Kate Scott
- Carter B. Smith
- Joel A. Spivak
- Mychael Urban
- Jan Wahl
- Kim Wonderley

== Former syndicated shows ==
- Costas Coast to Coast (syndicated, hosted by Bob Costas)
- The Rush Limbaugh Show (syndicated)
- Instant Replay (syndicated, hosted by Pat Summerall); later Pat Summerall's Sports in America
- The Extreme Scene (later syndicated)
  - Cyrus Saatsaz (host)
  - Steve Blankenship (host)
  - Omar Etcheverry (host)
- SportsPhone 680 with other hosts
  - SportsPhone 680 was formerly hosted by Larry Krueger, who was fired after a personal rant against the Giants on the show. During his rant, he criticized the Giants for brain-dead Caribbean hitters hacking at slop nightly. Krueger was first suspended for 10 days, then, on August 10, 2005, KNBR announced that it had ceased professional relations with Krueger. Damon Bruce took over the show in October 2005 and hosted until February 26, 2010, when he started his own noon–4 pm show on KNBR. FP Santangelo took over as SportsPhone680 host. His show lasted from March 1, 2010, to January 19, 2011, after the Washington Nationals hired him as their color commentator for MASN. Eric Byrnes took over as SportsPhone680 host, and hosted his first show on March 23, 2011. In May 2012 when Ralph Barbieri was fired by KNBR, Byrnes agreed to co-host with Tom Tolbert until they found a permanent co-host. Byrnes still hosted SportsPhone680 on days where the Giants played day games. He did his last show in July 2012 and Ray Woodson, who's filled in on SportsPhone680 many times and was formerly a sidekick on the Gary Radnich show, officially took over as host.
- Untitled (Public Affairs)

Originating as part of the station's statutory requirement of public affairs programming, the station now airs an hour-long interview show Saturday mornings at 5 am.

During the 1990s, the program typically began and ended with the phrase This is Gimmy Park Li, your host. No program title was given. Interviews for this program often consisted of local individuals in volunteer, charitable, or minor governmental capacities.

Due to its time slot, the program is the quintessential example of the Sunday morning public affairs ghetto. The program has never been promoted outside of its timeslot. Gimmy Park Li was the station's public affairs director. Her signature was her sign off: "This is Gimmy Park Li, your host. Thank you for spending your time ... with us."

== See also ==
- List of initial AM-band station grants in the United States
