= KKJL =

- San Luis Obispo, California; United States
- Broadcast area: San Luis Obispo, California
- Frequency: 1400 kHz
- Branding: K-Jewel AM 1400 & FM 106.5

Programming
- Format: Adult standards
- Affiliations: Westwood One; Golden State Warriors; San Francisco 49ers; San Francisco Giants

Ownership
- Owner: Rip Curl Broadcasting LLC
- Sister stations: KXTK

History
- First air date: February 10, 1960
- Former call signs: KSLY (1960–1984); KUNA (1984–1985); KLTW (1985–1988); KKCB (1988–1992); KIXT (1992–1993); KIID (1993–1995)
- Call sign meaning: "Jewel"

Technical information
- Licensing authority: FCC
- Facility ID: 58897
- Class: C
- Power: 1,000 watts
- Transmitter coordinates: 35°15′50.9″N 120°39′59.6″W
- Translator: 106.5 K293AW (San Luis Obispo)

Links
- Public license information: Public file; LMS

KKJL (1400 AM, "K-Jewel") is a commercial radio station licensed to San Luis Obispo, California, United States, and serves the San Luis Obispo area. The station is owned by Pacific Coast Media, LLC and broadcasts an adult standards format. KKJL is the San Luis Obispo radio affiliate of the Golden State Warriors basketball team. KKJL is rebroadcast on FM translator K293AW (106.5 FM) in San Luis Obispo.

== History ==
The station first signed on February 10, 1960 as KSLY. Original owner Rex O. Stevenson sold the station to Berry Broadcasters Inc. for $50,000 in April 1961. In January 1976, KSLY Broadcasting Company, owned by Homer Odom, sold KSLY and FM sister station KUNA to two separate corporations owned by the same Chicago-based group for a combined $535,000. Three years later, in July 1979, the station pair was sold to San Luis Obispo Broadcasting Inc., owned by Dudley A. White, for $1,575,000.

In February 1984, KSLY, a top 40 outlet, switched call signs and formats with KUNA, which aired a beautiful music format. The call letters changed again to KLTW in March 1985, then to KKCB on May 13, 1988.

On May 7, 1990, San Luis Obispo Broadcasting sold KKCB and FM station KSLY to MHHF Media Ventures Inc. for $1.6 million. The new owner changed the AM station's call letters to KIXT on August 7, 1992. Further call sign changes came on November 1, 1993 to KIID and on June 1, 1995 to KKJL.

In April 2014, San Luis Obispo Broadcasting sold KKJL and its translator to Pacific Coast Media, LLC, which also owns KXTK, for $360,000. The transaction closed two months later.

== Translator ==
In June 2010, San Luis Obispo Broadcasting purchased a translator station to simulcast KKJL on the FM band. That station, K293AW in San Luis Obispo, began rebroadcasting KKJL in November 2011 at the 106.5 MHz frequency.
