= Gary Radnich =

American sports announcer

- Born: Gary Kelley Radunich; February 2, 1950 (age 76); San Jose, California, U.S.
- Education: Brigham Young University, UNLV
- Occupations: Radio personality, sports anchor

Gary Kelley Radunich (born February 2, 1950), known as Gary Radnich, is an American retired radio and television host in the San Francisco bay area. He hosted The Gary Radnich Show which ran weekday mornings on KNBR radio, and was the lead sports anchor on KRON television.

== Biography ==
=== Early life ===
Radnich was born and raised in San Jose, California to Bill and Evelyn Radunich. He was an All-American Basketball player at Del Mar High School and Branham High.

His college career began at Brigham Young University on a basketball scholarship, and he transferred to UNLV after two years. While in Las Vegas he received notoriety for his purple El Dorado Cadillac, known as 'Raddy's Caddy'.

=== Broadcasting career ===
Radnich started his broadcast career at KVVU in Henderson, Nevada. From there, he had stints at KTXL in Sacramento, California and KMPH-TV in Fresno, California. From 1982 to 1985, Radnich served as the sports director at WBNS-TV in Columbus, Ohio, where he also called Ohio State Buckeyes football games.

Radnich was the sports director at KRON-TV from 1985 to 2018. He was also a talk show host at KNBR radio from 1992 to 2019, hosting a three-hour show each weekday.

In 2010 Radnich was inducted into the Bay Area Radio Hall of Fame. He has been honored three times by Associated Press, for the Best Television Sports cast in California. Ann Killion of the San Jose Mercury News called him "the biggest name in Bay Area Broadcasting."

In 2006 and 2007, the SF Weekly named Radnich "Best Sportscaster", noting that his broadcasts are "spontaneous" and that he "knows sports".

In September 2018, Radnich retired from KRON TV, and on June 22, 2019, at age 69, he retired from KNBR radio.
