= Ted Robinson (sportscaster) =

American sportscaster (born 1957)

- Born: Theodore Robinson; July 19, 1957 (age 69); Queens, New York, U.S.
- Education: University of Notre Dame
- Children: (2) - Annie and Pat
- Sports commentary career
- Genre: Play-by-play
- Sports: American football, baseball, basketball, boxing, golf, ice hockey, tennis

Theodore Robinson (born July 19, 1957) is an American sportscaster. Since 2000, Robinson has been with NBC Sports as a play-by-play announcer for tennis and Olympic swimming/diving and with NBC Sports Network calling college football and basketball. He also works for the Tennis Channel and the Pac-12 Network and was the radio play-by-play announcer for the San Francisco 49ers from 2009 until 2018.

== Early life and education ==
Ted Robinson grew up in Rockville Centre, New York, and attended Chaminade High School. He is a 1978 graduate of the University of Notre Dame, where he worked with future U.S. Senator Joe Donnelly and future Notre Dame football coach Charlie Weis at the college radio station.

His wife, Mary, is also a '78 ND grad, and their two children graduated from ND as well: Annie in 2005 and Pat in 2008. After graduating, Robinson got his first job broadcasting hockey for a minor league team in Oklahoma City. He went on to become a two-time Emmy Award-winning broadcaster. Robinson has completed four marathons, including the 1999 Boston Marathon.

== Broadcasting career ==
=== Tennis ===
Robinson has broadcast for Tennis Channel since 2007, calling the Australian Open, French Open, US Open, Davis Cup, Fed Cup, and US Open Series. Robinson served as the lead commentator of NBC's tennis coverage from 2000 through 2018. Robinson called the French Open and (through 2011), Wimbledon Championships for NBC. He broadcast the US Open for 22 years on USA Network, receiving acclaim for his partnership with John McEnroe, which continues on NBC and Tennis Channel. The pair also called the men's singles Gold Medal match at the 2012 Summer Olympics, played at Wimbledon.

=== Baseball ===
Robinson has worked for a number of Major League Baseball teams over the years. He served as a radio and TV announcer for the San Francisco Giants for nine seasons, as the TV commentator of the Minnesota Twins for 6 seasons, as a TV and radio announcer for the New York Mets for 4 seasons, and as the TV announcer for the Oakland Athletics for 3 seasons.

In addition to his work with the Athletics, Mets, Twins, and Giants, Robinson worked for The Baseball Network as an commentator for two years, worked four years on NBC Sports' Major League Baseball Game of the Week, and spent several years as a play-by-play voice for CBS Radio's Game of the Week. In 2007, Robinson teamed with Steve Stone to call the American League Division Series for TBS between the Boston Red Sox and Los Angeles Angels.

Robinson returned to calling Twins games in 2011, calling play-by-play for the team's radio broadcasts on a part-time basis due to primary announcer John Gordon working a reduced schedule prior to retiring after the season.

Robinson's voice is featured in the movie A Few Good Men as he calls a Minnesota Twins game being watched by Tom Cruise's character.

=== Olympics ===
Robinson served as NBC's diving commentator for the 2012 London Olympics and has been a play-by-play man for the last eight Olympic Games (four Winter Olympics and four Summer Olympics). His Summer Olympic assignments began with baseball at the 2000 Summer Olympics in Sydney, where the U.S. baseball team upset Cuba for the gold medal, and diving and canoeing at the 2004 Summer Olympics in Athens, both for NBC.

His Winter Olympics assignments began with short track speed skating, freestyle skiing, and the giant slalom snowboarding event at the 1998 Winter Olympics in Nagano for CBS, and short track at the 2002 Winter Olympics in Salt Lake City, 2006 Winter Olympics in Turin and 2010 Winter Olympics, this time for NBC. Robinson called Apolo Ohno's eight short track Olympic medals for NBC, and served as the play-by-play announcer for NBC Sports coverage of diving at the last three Summer Games, including David Boudia's gold medal win in London.

==== Other sports ====
In 2012, he became the lead play-by-play voice for the new Pac-12 Network, working primary football games and other sports.

In 2011, he continued his college football work for Versus (now NBC Sports Network), where he called college football games in 2009–11, and, in 2008, he served as studio host for College Football Central. Robinson has called many other sports over the years, including college basketball for CBS TV and radio. He has broadcast the NCAA Men's Division I Basketball Championship tournament on radio for 24 years, currently with Dial Global.

For NBC, he has covered swimming and diving, arena football, ski jumping, luge, equestrian, and triathlons.

From 1980 to 1982, he served as a color commentator on radio broadcasts of the NHL Minnesota North Stars. In 1983 at the age of 26, he was named play-by-play voice of the NBA Golden State Warriors, a position he held for two seasons. In 1989–90, he was the TV voice of the NBA Charlotte Hornets. He called Pac-10 Basketball for FSN and in 2011 he continued his college football work for NBC Sports Network as the play-by-play voice of Pac-12 football.

He was the radio voice of Stanford football for 13 years, has broadcast Notre Dame football and basketball, University of Minnesota basketball, and University of California basketball. In 2008 and 2007, he hosted College Football Central for Versus, for whom he also called play-by-play of Pac-10 football and Mountain West basketball in 2009 and 2010.

In his 22 years at USA Network, he called Grand Slam tennis events, boxing, college basketball, PGA Tour golf, and the World League of American Football.

==== Notable games ====
One notable game Robinson called was in the first round of the 1998 NCAA basketball tournament, when 13th-seeded Valparaiso University upset 4th-seeded Ole Miss in dramatic fashion. Point guard Bryce Drew hit a three-pointer at the buzzer, winning the game for the Valpo Crusaders, 70–69. Robinson's call went like this:

The inbounder will be Jamie Sykes, Carter pressuring... It's to Jenkins, to Drew for the win! GOOD!!! HE DID IT!! BRYCE DREW DID IT!! VALPO HAS WON THE GAME, A MIRACLE!! (after a short pause) An absolute miracle! Bryce Drew has won it for Valparaiso!

Also, during the 2012 Divisional playoff game between the 49ers vs Saints, Robinson along with his broadcast partner Eric Davis made a historical call, in the final 14 seconds of the game, the Saints led the 49ers 32–29, Alex Smith threw the game-winning touchdown to Vernon Davis to defeat the Saints 36–32. Robinson's call went like this:

The 49ers send two receivers wide right, two tight ends wide left, Smith in the Gun with Gore on his left hip, 3rd down Alex takes the snap, Alex looking...

(Davis) He's Got Him.

The post and he's..

(Davis) GOT IT!!!

CAUGHT! TOUCHDOWN! TOUCHDOWN 49ERS!!!!

(Davis) WOO HOO HOO!

Vernon Davis with the play of his life! Alex Smith with the play of his life! And the 49ers, are 9 seconds away from playing for the NFC Championship! Can You Feel Candlestick?!

Another notable game on the radio game he called was David Akers' 63-yard field goal for the 49ers' at halftime. They would go on to knock off the Green Bay Packers.

Preceded by Joe Starkey	San Francisco 49ers radio play-by-play announcer 2009-2018	Succeeded by Greg Papa
