= KTCT =

- San Mateo, California; United States
- Broadcast area: San Francisco Bay Area
- Frequency: 1050 kHz
- Branding: KNBR 1050

Programming
- Format: Sports
- Network: ESPN Radio
- Affiliations: San Francisco Dons; San Jose Earthquakes; Stanford Cardinal

Ownership
- Owner: Cumulus Media Inc.; (Radio License Holding SRC LLC)
- Sister stations: KNBR; KNBR-FM; KSAN; KSFO

History
- First air date: September 26, 1946
- Former call signs: KVSM (1946–1958); KOFY (1958–1997)
- Call sign meaning: Ticket (former branding)

Technical information
- Licensing authority: FCC
- Facility ID: 51188
- Class: B
- Power: 50,000 watts day; 10,000 watts night
- Transmitter coordinates: 37°39′1.8″N 122°9′5.9″W
- Repeater: 107.7 KSAN-HD3 (San Mateo)

Links
- Public license information: Public file; LMS
- Webcast: Listen live; Listen live; Listen live (via iHeartRadio)
- Website: www.thesportsleader.com

KTCT (1050 AM) is a commercial radio station licensed to San Mateo, California, and serving the San Francisco Bay Area. It is owned by Cumulus Media and airs a sports radio format as KNBR 1050, a sister station to KNBR and KNBR-FM. In contrast to KNBR-AM-FM having local sports talk and play-by-play most of the day, KTCT is mainly a pass-through for nationally syndicated programming from ESPN Radio. KTCT is also the flagship station for San Jose Earthquakes soccer, Stanford University football, and University of San Francisco men's basketball.

By day, KTCT is powered at 50,000 watts, the maximum for commercial AM stations in the U.S. But because 1050 AM is a clear channel frequency reserved for Class A XEG Monterrey, KTCT reduces power at sunset to 10,000 watts. It uses a directional antenna at all times with a five-tower array. The transmitter is off West Winton Avenue in Hayward, near San Francisco Bay.

== History ==
=== KVSM ===
In September 1946, the station first signed on with the call sign KVSM, standing for the "Voice of San Mateo". The station ran only 250 watts and was a daytimer. The station was a network affiliate of the short lived Progressive Broadcasting System in the early 1950s. In 1953, the station's power was increased to 1,000 watts.

=== KOFY ===
In 1958, the station's call sign was changed to KOFY. From the 1960s through the 1980s, KOFY aired a Spanish language format. In early 1986, the station was sold to James Gabbert for $2,000,000. In March 1986, the station began airing an oldies format. In late 1986, the station added nighttime operations, running 500 watts. In 1989, the station's daytime power was increased to 50,000 watts, and its nighttime power was increased to 1,000 watts. In 1991, the station returned to airing a Spanish language format. In 1992, the station's nighttime power was increased to 10,000 watts.

=== KTCT ===
In May 1997, the station adopted a sports format as "The Ticket", and its call sign was changed to KTCT. That same month, KTCT became the new flagship radio station for the Oakland Raiders Radio Network, replacing FM station KYCY. In 2003, the station was rebranded "KNBR 1050". After the 2003 season, KTCT dropped the Raiders, whose games moved to KSFO beginning in 2004.

Since 1999, the station has operated at 35,000 watts at night, but using its daytime antenna system, under a special temporary authority, due to the unauthorized nighttime operations of XED-AM 1050 in Mexicali, Baja California, Mexico.

== Ownership ==
KNBR and KTCT are owned by Cumulus Media Partners, LLC, a private partnership of Cumulus Media, Bain Capital, The Blackstone Group, and Thomas H. Lee Partners. It was purchased from Susquehanna-Pfaltzgraff Media in 2005 along with other Susquehanna Radio Corporation stations.

== Programming ==
On KTCT, weekday programming consists of the ESPN Radio network schedule, except between 12-3pm when The Jim Rome Show is carried. Weekend programs outside of the ESPN schedule include brokered programming and replays of KNBR podcasts. On Sunday mornings to fulfill required public affairs programming guidelines, speeches and presentations from the Commonwealth Club of California are carried.

KNBR and KTCT were charter affiliates of CBS Sports Radio, a joint venture between CBS Radio and Cumulus, which started on January 2, 2013. NBC Sports Radio has also been covered on KTCT. Through these affiliates, other games and events from MLB, NBA, NFL, PGA Tour, NASCAR, and NCAA have been broadcast.

=== Live sports broadcasts ===
Sports content has included San Francisco Giants MLB baseball, San Jose SaberCats arena football, San Jose Earthquakes soccer, and Stanford Football. Some AM broadcasts on KNBR may be moved to KTCT due to conflicts with Giants games. Golden State Warriors basketball had also been covered until August 25, 2016, the Warriors announced they have ended their partnership with KNBR and signed with KGMZ-FM; the partnership with KNBR lasted 40 years, including 32 consecutive years.

In 2019, KTCT signed a contract to broadcast University of San Francisco men's basketball.
