= List of American public address announcers =

This is a list of notable American public address announcers.

== Baseball ==
Major League Baseball - Current Public Address Announcers

- Dan Baker – Philadelphia Phillies
- Gene Honda – Chicago White Sox, Chicago Blackhawks, DePaul University, NCAA Men's Division I Basketball
- Marysol Castro – First Woman Announcer for New York Mets, First Latina Woman Announcer in Major League Baseball
- Bob Ford – Houston Astros, University of Houston football championship, and Chicago PBS WTTW
- Paul Olden – New York Yankees
- Tom Hutyler – Seattle Mariners

Major League Baseball - Former Public Address Announcers

- Alex Anthony – New York Jets and New York Mets
- Pete Arbogast – Los Angeles Dodgers
- Rex Barney – Baltimore Orioles
- Carl Beane – Boston Red Sox
- Renel Brooks-Moon – San Francisco Giants
- Charlie Brotman – U.S. presidential inauguration parades, Washington Senators, Washington Nationals
- Frederick William Burns – Earliest known announcer dating to 1884, New York Giants, Track and Field, Bicycle Racing, Automobile Racing, Boxing, Rowing
- Dick Callahan – Oakland Athletics, and Saint Mary's College of California
- Bob Casey – Minnesota Twins
- J. Fred Duckett – Houston Astros
- Sherm Feller – Boston Red Sox
- Paul Friedman – Chicago Cubs
- Halsey Hall – Minnesota Twins
- Jim Hall – New York Giants football team, New York Yankees
- Sherman Maxwell - known as "Jocko". 1st Sports Commentator of color. Also, PA announcer for the Newark Eagles of Negro league baseball.
- Bill Melton - Texas Rangers
- Wayne Messmer – Chicago Cubs
- Joel Meyers – St. Louis Cardinals
- Nick Nickson – Los Angeles Dodgers
- Pat Pieper – Chicago Cubs
- John Ramsey – Los Angeles Dodgers, Los Angeles Kings, Los Angeles Lakers, Los Angeles Rams, Los Angeles Angels, USC Trojans
- Bob Sheppard – New York Yankees, New York Giants
- Sherry Davis - San Francisco Giants - 1st Full Time Female Public Address Announcer in Professional Baseball History. 1993–2000

== Basketball ==
Current NBA PA announcers (East)

- Darian "Big Tigger" Morgan – Atlanta Hawks
- Olivier Sedra – Brooklyn Nets (2018–Present)
- Eddie Palladino – Boston Celtics
- Tim Sinclair – Chicago Bulls
- John Mason – Detroit Pistons
- Mike Walczewski – New York Knicks
- Herbie Kuhn - Toronto Raptors

(West)

- Mark Mason – Portland Trail Blazers
- Scott Moak - Sacramento Kings

Former NBA PA announcers

- Ray Clay – Chicago Bulls (1990–2002)
- Andy Jick – Boston Celtics
- Lawrence Tanter – Los Angeles Lakers
- Michael Baiamonte – Miami Heat
- Patrick K. Doughty (Big Pat) – Charlotte Hornets
- Paul Porter – Orlando Magic
- Dan Roberts – Utah Jazz (1979-2025)

Current NCAA PA announcers

Former NCAA PA announcers

- Andy Jick – Boston College
- Frank Fallon – NCAA Men's Division I Basketball Championship
- Gene Honda – DePaul University, NCAA Final Four
- Bill Melton- Southern Methodist University

== Boxing/Wrestling ==
- Michael Buffer – Boxing
- Tony Chimel – World Wrestling Entertainment
- David Diamante – boxing (also spent six seasons with the Brooklyn Nets)
- Howard Finkel – World Wrestling Entertainment
- Lilian Garcia – World Wrestling Entertainment
- Joe Humphreys – Boxing, member of the Boxing Hall of Fame
- Jimmy Lennon, Jr. – boxing
- Justin Roberts – All Elite Wrestling, formerly of World Wrestling Entertainment

== Football ==
National Football League

- Chico Renfroe - 1st Known African-American PA Announcer in the National Football League for the Atlanta Falcons, late 1970s
- Alan Roach – Minnesota Vikings, Super Bowl, Pro Bowl, NFL International Series, former PA Announcer of the Denver Broncos
- Jeff Shreve – Cleveland Browns
- Tim Sinclair – Chicago Bears
- Bill Melton - Dallas Cowboys, Super Bowl, Pro Bowl

Other Football Announcers

- Kate Scott - 1st Female to Announce NCAA Division I-A (FBS) Football Game with the Pac-12 Football Championship Game

== Horse racing ==
- Chic Anderson – horse racing (best known for work at Belmont Park)
- Tom Durkin – horse racing
- Phil Georgeff – horse racing
- Tom Harris – horse racing
- Dave Johnson – horse racing

== Ice Hockey ==
National Hockey League

- Gene Honda – Chicago White Sox, Chicago Blackhawks, DePaul University, NCAA Final Four, and Chicago PBS WTTW
- Lou Nolan – Philadelphia Flyers
- Mike Ross – Toronto Maple Leafs
- Wes Johnson – Washington Capitals
- Alan Roach - Colorado Avalanche
- Paul Porter- Tampa Bay Lightning Orlando Magic
- Joe Tolleson - New York Rangers
- Alex Anthony - New York Islanders

== Mixed ==
- Tom Carnegie – Indianapolis Motor Speedway, Indiana high school basketball
- Marty Glickman – (sports announcer)
- Bob Jenkins - Indianapolis Motor Speedway
- Bill Melton - 1996 Olympics, Cotton Bowl Classic, Texas Relays, FIBA World Basketball Championships, FIFA Men's and Women's World Cup Soccer, World Championship Tennis, SMU football and basketball
- Alan Roach – Colorado Avalanche, Colorado Rapids, Minnesota Vikings, Super Bowl, Pro Bowl, NFL International Series, Olympic Hockey, Olympic Boxing, former PA Announcer of the Denver Broncos
- Jeff Shreve – Cleveland Browns – University of Akron, Canton Charge, Mid-American Conference
- Don Wadewitz - Milwaukee Area Technical College Stormers, UW-Whitewater Warhawks
