= List of Athletics broadcasters =

This is a list of Athletics broadcasters. Broadcasters for the Athletics, a baseball franchise based in West Sacramento, California, include three broadcasters for radio (Ken Korach, Vince Cotroneo, and Roxy Bernstein), three broadcasters for television (Jenny Cavnar, Dallas Braden, Chris Caray), and one stadium announcer (Amelia Schimmel). There are also many past broadcasters, dating back to at least 1938 when Byrum Saam became the Philadelphia Athletics' first radio voice.

== Current broadcasters ==
=== Radio ===
Athletics' games in Sacramento are broadcast on KSTE; in the Bay Area, they are broadcast on KNEW, which had been the Oakland Athletics' flagship from 2020 until 2024; while KWNR's HD2 subchannel airs games in the Athletics' forthcoming home of Las Vegas. Outside the Bay Area, the A's radio network of 18 stations (three of them nights and weekends only) reaches baseball fans in Northern California and Nevada. The team also has an in-market online radio station branded as A's Cast which is available on iHeartRadio.

As of 2022, the Athletics' radio broadcast team consists of Ken Korach, Vince Cotroneo and Roxy Bernstein. Korach, A's play-by-play announcer since 1996, moved up to the lead position with the death of Bill King. Cotroneo has had 13 years of major-league experience, most recently with the Texas Rangers. King, who died on October 18, 2005, was the lead radio voice of the Athletics for 25 years, from 1981 through 2005, the longest tenure for an A's announcer since the team's games were first broadcast in 1938 (they were the Philadelphia Athletics from 1901 to 1954, and the Kansas City Athletics from 1955 to 1967, before owner Charles O. Finley moved them to Oakland). King was paired in the booth with Lon Simmons from 1981 through 1995. Former A's catcher Ray Fosse served as the broadcast team's analyst from 1986 to 2021. For several years starting in 2001, Steve Bitker served as a back-up play-by-play announcer, averaging about 20 games per season. He had limited appearances in 2006, filling in when Korach was on vacation.

Robert Buan held the position of Athletics' broadcasting manager from 1995 to 2010. He also hosted the "Extra Innings" postgame radio talk show, which fans called to talk about the A's with Buan or a guest. The show often emanated from the stadium or in a studio, and certain select ones were broadcast from local bars or restaurants before a live audience. He also did Internet-only play-by-play of spring training games. He was succeeded by Chris Townsend and Rick Tittle.

King, a native of Bloomington, Illinois, was perhaps the most well-known sports announcer in the Bay Area, having previously handled play-by-play work for football's Oakland and Los Angeles Raiders (1966–1992) and basketball's San Francisco and Golden State Warriors (1962–1983). His trademark catchphrase "Holy Toledo!" was familiar to Northern California sports fans for over forty years. King and his fellow Athletics radio announcers, Ken Korach and Ray Fosse, were ranked as the second-best broadcast team in the American League by USA Today in 2005.

=== Television ===
A's games are telecast on NBC Sports California, with 15 games simulcast on KVVU-TV in Las Vegas in preparation for the team's move.

From 1986 to 2021, former major league catcher, Ray Fosse analyzed the games. When not doing so in the television booth, Fosse added to the radio broadcast team. Chris Townsend hosts "A's Cast Live", the A's Radio Network pre- and postgame shows, and is an in-studio host for NBC Sports California for select broadcasts.

In August 2021, Fosse announced that he had been battling cancer for the past 16 years, and that he would 'take a step away' from broadcasting effective immediately in order to concentrate on his fight against the disease. Fosse died on October 13, 2021.

In 2024, the Athletics hired Jenny Cavnar to be their play-by-play announcer, making her the first female full-time play-by-play announcer in MLB.

=== Stadium announcer ===
As of March 9, 2021, Amelia Schimmel is the Athletics' official stadium announcer at RingCentral Coliseum.

Roy Steele was the Athletics' official stadium announcer at the Coliseum every year since the team's move to Oakland in 1968. His booming baritone voice had earned him the Voice of God moniker among A's fans, although it was first bestowed upon him by sports announcer Jon Miller after a visit to the Coliseum as a fan sitting in the stands. Steele had been an independent Baptist minister for 17 years before being named stadium announcer and found the name "a little overpowering". From 1968 through 2004, Steele had missed fewer than ten home games, but in September 2005, an illness (achalasia, a rare disorder of the esophagus) prevented him from announcing several games including most of the final homestand. The 73-year-old Steele was ill for most of 2006, and remained at his home in Auburn while recovering. His interim replacement was Dick Callahan, who also announced for the Golden State Warriors. Steele returned behind the microphone beginning with the A's exhibition game vs. the Giants on April 1, 2007. However, health issues sidelined Steele for the entire 2009 season, with Callahan returning to the post. Steele made another return on his own Bobblehead Giveaway Day on April 17, 2010, with the A's facing the Baltimore Orioles, announcing every inning (with the exception of the visiting half of the first inning) and throwing out the ceremonial first pitch.

Steele died on May 28, 2020. Callahan continued as the Athletics' stadium announcer through the 2019 season. He sat out the 2020 season due to health concerns, with Amelia Schimmel taking his place. He planned to return for the 2021 season, but he died on January 29, 2021. On March 9, 2021, the A's announced Schimmel as Callahan's permanent successor.

== Previous broadcasters ==
=== Philadelphia years ===
In 1938, a young Texan named Byrum Saam became the first radio voice of the A's. Saam, later joined by Claude Haring, broadcast all the Athletics’ home games on station WIBG. Because Saam and Haring also broadcast Phillies’ home games as well, A's road games were only broadcast when there was no conflict with a Phillies home game. Even so, the team's road game broadcasts were what were called "ticker tape games" in that era. Saam and Haring would broadcast from studios in Philadelphia, reconstructing the game from telegraphic feeds brought in by assistants. Beginning in 1950, the Athletics began broadcasting all games, home and away, on WIBG with Saam and Haring accompanying the team on road trips. (The Phillies hired their own announcers in 1950 and broadcast their games on a different radio station.) Their tenure as A's broadcast announcers came to an end after the 1954 season, when the team was sold and moved.

=== Kansas City years ===
When the Athletics moved to Kansas City for the 1955 season, Merle Harmon and Billy Ray were hired as play-by-play announcers. Harmon remained the voice of the A's until 1962, when then-owner Charles O. Finley replaced him with Monte Moore, an Oklahoma native along with George Bryson a veteran announcer from the Cincinnati Reds. On September 16, 1964, Betty Caywood, previously a television weather analyst, was hired by owner Finley to join the broadcasting crew, becoming the first female play-by-play broadcaster in major league baseball. She finished out the 1964 season, but did not return in 1965.

=== Since the move to Oakland ===
Moore came west with the team's move to Oakland in 1968, remaining the team's principal radio/TV voice through the 1977 season. He was hired by NBC to announce the Saturday Game of the Week with Wes Parker and Maury Wills. He also was the announcer with Parker on the USA Network's USA Thursday Game of the Week. He came out of retirement in 1988 when the A's asked him to be the announcer on the A's telecasts with Ray Fosse as analyst. Moore broadcast those games through the 1992 season, commuting from Porterville, California, where he had moved his family and purchased the radio stations KTIP/KIOO.

The last year the A's were in Kansas City, there was an incident on a plane trip involving some players and a complaint by a passenger to a hostess. Moore was accused of telling about it to Finley, but years later, at a memorial service for Finley at the Oakland Coliseum, Moore was the emcee and following the program, Finley's youngest son, Paul, who was travelling with the A's on that trip, admitted to Moore and some others around there, that it was he who told his dad about the incident and that he had felt bad all these years that he knew Moore had not been the one who told Finley, and he wanted to apologize for the misery caused.

During Moore's tenure, he had a number of co-announcers with him in the booth, including Harry Caray, Bob Elson, Al Helfer, Red Rush, and Jim Woods, all of whom had achieved fame as major-league broadcasters elsewhere before joining the A's, and Jon Miller, who went on to success with the Orioles and Giants. Former major league players Curt Flood, Reggie Jackson, Harmon Killebrew, and Jim Piersall served as A's announcers at one time, as did former player and manager Bill Rigney.

As noted above, the late Bill King announced the A's games on radio from 1981 to 2005. He partnered on A's broadcasts for 15 years with future Hall-of-Famer Lon Simmons, with Ken Korach replacing Simmons for the 1996 season. Simmons had previously been an announcer for the Giants, the National League "crosstown" (actually cross-Bay) rivals of the American League A's, for many years (since their 1958 arrival from New York); Simmons rejoined the Giants broadcast team on a part-time basis from 1996 to 2002.

From 2006 to May 2023, Glen Kuiper provided play by play for the A's on NBC Sports California.

=== Broadcasters through the years ===
- Shooty Babitt 2014; 2023*
- Roxy Bernstein 2014–present
- Steve Bitker 2001–2011
- Dallas Braden 2017–present
- George Bryson 1963–1964
- Chris Caray 2024–present
- Harry Caray 1970
- Herb Carneal 1954
- Jenny Cavnar 2024–present
- Betty Caywood 1964
- Eric Chavez 2015**
- Vince Cotroneo 2006–2024 (radio)
- Johnny Doskow 2023–present
- Ed Edwards 1957–1958
- Bob Elson 1971
- Lynn Faris 1966–1967
- Curt Flood 1978
- Ray Fosse 1986–2021
- Bud Foster 1978
- Hank Greenwald 2004–2005
- Bill Grigsby 1958–1961
- Wayne Hagin 1981–1984
- Claude Haring c. 1940–1954
- Merle Harmon 1955–1961
- Scott Hatteberg 2012–2013***
- Al Helfer 1968–1969
- Reggie Jackson 1991–1992
- Harmon Killebrew 1981–1982
- Bill King 1981–2005
- Ken Korach 1996–present
- Bob Kozberg 1978
- Glen Kuiper 2004–2023
- Jon Miller 1974
- Monte Moore 1962–1980, 1985–1992
- Greg Papa 1990–2003
- Jim Peterson 1978
- Jim Piersall 1972
- Hal Ramey 1979
- Larry Ray 1955–1956
- Bruce Rice 1962
- Bill Rigney 1974, 1983–1984, 1991–1992
- Bip Roberts 2023
- Ted Robinson 1980, 1985–1987
- Tim Roye 2004–2006
- Red Rush 1965, 1971, 1979–1980
- By Saam 1938–1954
- John Shrader 1988–1989
- Lon Simmons 1981–1995
- Dick Stockton 1993–1995
- Chuck Thompson 1946–1948
- Dom Valentino 1980
- Wayne Walker 1976–1980, 1985
- Bob Waller 1975–1977
- Ken Wilson 1996–1998
- Jim Woods 1972–1973

*Babitt substituted for Fosse for several games during the 2014 season.
**Chavez substituted for Fosse for several games during the 2015 season.
***Hatteberg substituted for Fosse for several games during the 2012 and 2013 seasons.

== See also ==
- List of current Major League Baseball broadcasters
