= Sedra =

Sedra may refer to:

- Weekly Torah portion (sidra or sedra) in Judaism
- Adel Sedra (born 1943), Egyptian electrical engineer
- Olivier Sedra, Canadian American sports public address announcer
- Sedra Bistodeau (born 1994), American fiddler and violinist
- Sedra, a 2013 album by Humood AlKhudher
- Sedra (Riyadh), an integrated residential community in Riyadh, Saudi Arabia
