= Paul Friedman =

Paul Friedman may refer to:

- Paul L. Friedman (born 1944), American judge
- Paul Friedman (announcer) (born 1968), sports commentator

== See also ==
- Paul Freeman (disambiguation)
- Paul Freedman, American history professor
- Paul Friedmann (1840–c. 1900), German philanthropist and early Zionist
