= Vince Cotroneo =

Vince Cotroneo is a radio play-by-play announcer who last broadcast for the Oakland Athletics. He signed a two-year contract with the A's on January 13, 2006, to fill a void in the broadcast booth left by the sudden death of longtime lead announcer Bill King. Number-two announcer Ken Korach would slide into King's old number-one slot, with Cotroneo serving as the number-two man.

== Biography ==
Vince Cotroneo was born in Brooklyn, New York, and was raised in Orlando, Florida. He attended the University of Central Florida, graduating in 1983 with a degree in Radio and Television. He is the father of up and coming play-by-play baseball announcer Dominic Cotroneo, the voice of Arizona State baseball and hockey.

== Minor-League Broadcasting Timeline ==
1984: Worked for the Class A Lynchburg Mets (New York Mets organization – now defunct).

1985–1987: Announcer for the Class AA El Paso Diablos (formerly Milwaukee Brewers organization).

1988: Spent one season with the AAA Iowa Cubs (Chicago Cubs organization), where he was named the National Association's Minor League Announcer of the Year.

1989–1990: Broadcaster for the Tucson Toros, at the time a Triple-A affiliate of the Houston Astros. It was during this stint in the Pacific Coast League that he would meet his future Oakland broadcast partner, Ken Korach, at the time working for the Las Vegas Stars.

== Major-League Broadcasting Timeline ==
Cotroneo was hired by the Houston Astros in 1991, and remained with them through 1997, calling the action alongside Hall-of-Famer Milo Hamilton. In 1998, he moved upstate to Arlington, where he called the action for the Texas Rangers for six years, teaming with Eric Nadel on the radio side. After the 2003 season, Rangers president Michael Cramer elected not to renew Cotroneo's contract.

After spending two seasons out of baseball, Cotroneo submitted a sample of his work to A's Vice President of Broadcasting and Communications, Ken Pries. In December 2005, Pries interviewed Cotroneo, and the following month, made the decision to hire him for the 2006 season.

Cotroneo would continue broadcasting for the Athletics through the 2024 season, after which he would leave the team.

== Bibliography ==
2006 Oakland Athletics Media Guide. Pg. 409. Produced by the Oakland Athletics Public Relations Department.
