= Amelia Schimmel =

American public-address announcer and sports producer

- Born: August 7, 1986 (age 40); Oakland, California, U.S.
- Education: Brandeis University (BA)
- Occupation: Public Address Announcer
- Employer(s): Athletics; San Jose Barracuda; Bay FC

Amelia Schimmel is an American public-address announcer and sports producer who serves as the public-address announcer for the Athletics of Major League Baseball (MLB). She became the first woman to serve as the franchise's permanent public-address announcer when she was appointed to the position in 2021.

Before becoming the Athletics' PA announcer, Schimmel spent eight years working for MLB Network and later served as the Athletics' executive producer of game entertainment and video content.

== Early life and education ==
Schimmel is a native of Oakland, California, and grew up as a fan of the Athletics, attending games at the Oakland Coliseum with her family.

She began playing softball at age seven. Schimmel attended The College Preparatory School in Oakland, where she played on the boys' baseball team before helping establish the school's softball team.

Schimmel later attended Brandeis University in Waltham, Massachusetts, where she double-majored in economics and American studies and minored in journalism. She played four years of varsity softball for the Brandeis Judges.

== Career ==
=== MLB Network ===
After graduating from Brandeis, Schimmel began working in baseball production. She initially worked as a logger for Major League Baseball Productions before moving into a larger role at MLB Network.

Schimmel spent eight years at MLB Network, working as an editor and segment producer on programs including MLB Tonight, Hot Stove, High Heat, MLB Central, and Intentional Talk. She received six Emmy Awards during her time with the network.

=== Athletics ===
Schimmel joined the Athletics in November 2017 as the club's executive producer of game entertainment and video content. Her responsibilities included overseeing in-game entertainment and video production, including video-board content, public-address operations, music, pregame and postgame ceremonies, the team's mascot program and other ballpark entertainment.

Her public-address career began during the 2020 Major League Baseball season. Longtime Athletics announcer Dick Callahan opted not to work during the season because of health concerns during the COVID-19 pandemic, and Schimmel volunteered to assume the role. She had not previously worked professionally as a public-address announcer or broadcaster.

Schimmel announced the Athletics' 33 home games during the shortened 2020 season. Because spectators were not permitted in the ballpark, her announcements were primarily heard through television and radio broadcasts. Her work that season made her the first woman to handle public-address duties for the Athletics at the Coliseum.

Callahan, who had served as the Athletics' PA announcer for 15 seasons, died in January 2021. In March, the Athletics named Schimmel their permanent public-address announcer. She became the third permanent stadium announcer in the franchise's Oakland era, following Roy Steele and Callahan, and the first woman to hold the position.

At the time of her appointment, Schimmel was one of three women serving as active public-address announcers in Major League Baseball, alongside Renel Brooks-Moon of the San Francisco Giants and Marysol Castro of the New York Mets. Brooks-Moon publicly welcomed Schimmel's appointment and said the two had remained in contact after Brooks-Moon reached out to offer her support during Schimmel's first season behind the microphone.

Schimmel continued serving as the Athletics' public-address announcer following the franchise's departure from Oakland after the 2024 season and its temporary move to Sutter Health Park in West Sacramento, California. In 2026, she also served as the team's PA announcer for Athletics home games played in the Las Vegas Valley as the franchise prepared for its planned relocation to Nevada.

Schimmel additionally serves at the PA Announcer for Bay FC and the San Jose Barracuda.

== Personal life ==
Schimmel's younger sister, Joanna Schimmel, has also worked in professional baseball. The sisters' careers in Major League Baseball, including Amelia's work with the Athletics and Joanna's work with the Chicago Cubs, were profiled by The Athletic in 2025.

== See also ==
- List of Athletics broadcasters
- Women in baseball
