= Paul Porter =

Paul Porter may refer to:

- Paul Porter (announcer) (born c. 1954), American public address announcer
- Paul Porter (biker) (born 1963), Canadian outlaw biker and gangster
- Paul A. Porter (1904–1975), American lawyer and chairman of the Federal Communications Commission
- Paul Porter (musician) (born 1962), American gospel musician
- Paul Porter (Michigan politician) (1907–2002), American politician
- Steven Porter (Canadian politician) (Paul Steven Porter, born 1945), member of the Legislative Assembly of New Brunswick
