= Tim Sinclair =

Tim Sinclair may refer to:

- Tim Sinclair (author) (born 1972), Australian author
- Tim Sinclair (announcer) (born 1978), American television and radio broadcaster, and public address announcer

== See also ==
- Timothy J. Sinclair (died 2022), political scientist
