= Renel Brooks-Moon =

American radio personality and sports announcer

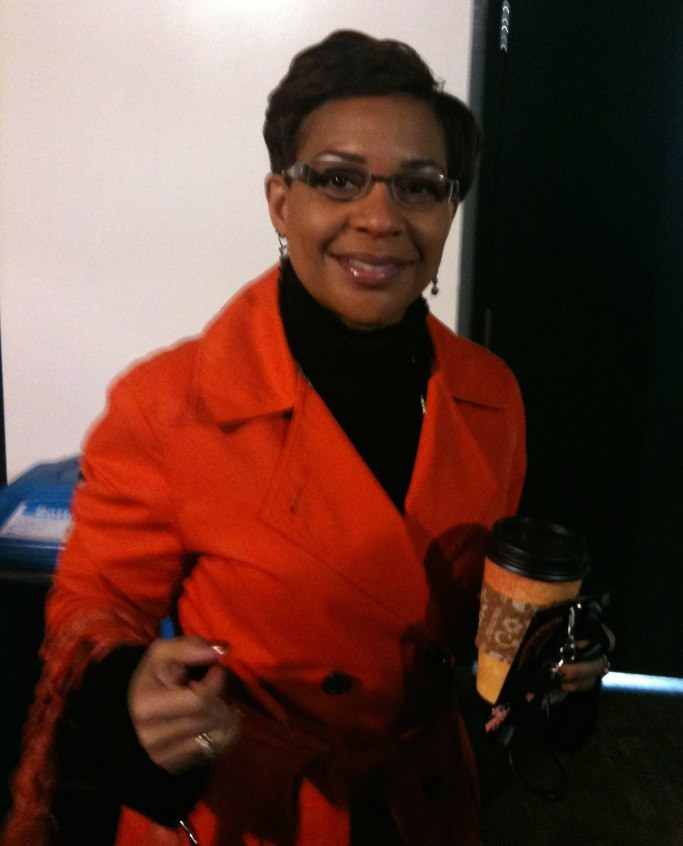
- Brooks-Moon at AT&T Park in 2010
- Born: September 22, 1958 (age 68); Oakland, California, United States
- Occupations: Public address announcer, radio personality
- Years active: 1986–2024
- Employer: San Francisco Giants

Renel Brooks-Moon (born September 22, 1958), known on-air simply as Renel, is an American former radio personality who hosted shows on radio stations KCBS, KFRC, KMEL, and KISQ before serving as the public address announcer for the San Francisco Giants from 2000 to 2024. Though she is the second female PA announcer in Giants and Major League Baseball history, Renel is the first African-American woman to be a Major League Baseball PA announcer as well as the first female PA announcer to announce a championship game and MLB's annual All-Star Game.

== Early life ==
One of three children, Renel Brooks-Moon was born in Oakland, California, in 1958. Her mother, Juanita, was a community volunteer and educator who taught English and typing and also mentored students of color in San Mateo. Juanita grew up a baseball fan, having been taught about the sport by Renel's grandfather who was a big fan of baseball in the Negro Leagues. Coincidentally, Juanita became pregnant with Renel the same year the Giants moved from New York to San Francisco and gave birth to Renel during the final month of the 1958 baseball season. Her father, Nathaniel, was a civil rights activist and, like his wife, was also an educator, teaching for nearly 20 years in Richmond, California, before becoming the first Black school principal in San Francisco in 1968, which helped to inspire Renel to achieve her goals.

Renel grew up on baseball, thanks to her parents' love of the game. While her parents were initially fans of the Dodgers (due to Jackie Robinson breaking the color barrier), they'd eventually become Giants fans after the team moved to San Francisco in 1958. In order to teach their children about baseball and its history, Nathaniel and Juanita often took Renel and her siblings to Candlestick Park and the Oakland Coliseum for Giants and Oakland Athletics games.

== Education ==
In her high school years, Brooks-Moon attended Woodside High School in Redwood City, California. From her first day at school in 1972, she found herself struggling with the prevalent racism within the school system. Racists would throw rocks at her school bus, white kids dressed in blackface and afros during Halloween, and violence would break out due to the desegregation program that had gone into effect at Bay Area Peninsula schools in the 1970s. Her grades would suffer as a result of the stress, something she hid from her parents because she didn't want to be seen as a disappointment, considering how entrenched they were in the educational system. To combat her personal and academic struggles, she found solace within cheerleading, music, and drama.

Brooks-Moon's academic career wouldn't flourish until she began to attend Mills College in Oakland where she got involved in the Women's Studies and African-American Studies program before settling on English as a major. It was at Mills where Brooks-Moon co-founded a gospel choir called "The Black Women's Collective", a group she credits for pulling her out of her shell and putting herself in front of a microphone. As such, she'd often host student social events and took up small gigs deejaying parties for her fellow students. She would graduate with a bachelor's degree in English in 1981.

== Radio career ==
=== KCBS ===
Following her graduation from Mills College, Brooks-Moon got an entry-level job at local AM station, KCBS. While she was able to learn how a radio station functioned and had enjoyed her time there, she wasn't fully satisfied with the position. As a result, Renel worked her way around the station, becoming an assistant in production and public affairs. She also helped to produce shows for community organizations which weren't getting much attention or publicity.

=== KFRC ===
After four years at the station, Brooks-Moon used her experience to obtain a position as a sales assistant with Bay Area radio station, KFRC. Even though it was a non-broadcast job, Renel was ecstatic to get her foot in the door at a music station. Eventually, she landed a position in the Public Affairs department at the station and even ran it while her supervisor was out on maternity leave. After the station decided that they needed to cut costs by producing their block of community talk shows in-house, Renel was approached to host the show "Bay View", which addressed concerns of citizens within the Bay Area's Black community, which she took up in earnest. At first, she was simply reading scripts and produced material but soon began booking and talking with her own guests due to the connections she had made while growing up and living within the community. But, it wasn't until Brooks-Moon would sing a block of Motown songs at the company Christmas party in 1985 that her voice talents were truly recognized. Brooks-Moon was approached by then-program director "The Duke" Dave Schollen who connected her with KFRC's on-air crews in order to create a demo tape. A week after the demo tapes were sent off, Brooks-Moon was given her own Top 40 music show which aired at midnight on the weekend, which introduced listeners to "Rockin' Renel". She became one of the most popular voices on the station. Two months later, she was promoted to a spot during commute hours (from 3 PM to 7 PM) called "Afternoon Drive". Renel thought that she'd have the job for years – but the station decided to undergo a format change, killing the modern music she was used to and switched to big band music instead. Most of the station was laid off during that time.

=== KMEL ===
Soon after, Renel was approached by Jack Silver, the music director at KFRC who knew Steve Rivers, the program director at KMEL FM. Silver promised that he would send Renel's air checks to Rivers so that she'd get work there. Renel agreed to this but didn't think much of it, figuring that nothing would come of it. Renel was hired at KMEL, in 1986, as the overnight DJ on the weekends a week after she had been laid off at KFRC, dropping her "Rockin' Renel" moniker and simply becoming "Renel". In 1988, KMEL became one of the first radio stations in the country to start playing hip hop songs and one of their most popular shows had become their morning show, "The Morning Zoo". While Renel had already been promoted to the 10 PM hour after a new program director came to the station, she got a chance at the morning show when DJ Sue Hall went on maternity leave. Renel's presence on The Morning Zoo became so popular, the station told Renel that they were going to keep her on the show and fire Hall, something Renel fiercely objected to, telling her superiors that she was happy simply going back to her own night time slot. The station, however, had already made up their minds and fired Hall anyhow, much to Renel's disgust. Renel made a point of confronting Hall to tell her that she objected to her firing but the station wouldn't relent. Despite this, the two remain friends decades later.

=== KISQ ===
Renel would continue to host the morning show on KMEL until 1997 when the station decided to introduce their newly acquired sister station, KISQ 98.1 FM. At the time, ClearChannel, which owned both KMEL and KISQ, had a successful station in Chicago which had mixed older songs in with newer ones. Thus, KISQ (dubbed "KMEL's big sister" by the execs in charge) would end up doing the same: playing songs from the late 1980s along with current Top 40 hits. Renel was given the chance to host her own morning show (titled "Renel in the Morning") and become head anchor, which she accepted.

== Baseball career ==
Renel's run at KISQ ended after just two years when the station decided to undergo another format change – but she was immediately contacted by the Giants' VP of Marketing asking her if she'd be interested in auditioning for the PA announcer for the Giants' new ballpark, dubbed "Pacific Bell Park" which was due to open in 2000. She attended the auditions in late 1999, winning the job months later. The team's thought process was that, after the departure of Sherry Davis who had broken baseball's glass ceiling by becoming the first female PA announcer in the history of Major League Baseball, they didn't want to go backwards. As such, every person auditioning for the role was a woman. What separated Renel from the rest of the group was her experience: the Giants were looking for someone with experience in radio.

As the Giants' PA announcer, Brooks-Moon became an iconic figure with her dynamic voice. Known for her "infectious enthusiasm" and "intensity" (according to former Giants catcher Buster Posey), Daniel Brown of The Athletic described Renel's vocal style as "soaring, energetic and often stealthily strategic", adding that she has "that reliably bouncy, relentlessly spirited Renel Brooks-Moon voice that sounds a lot like baseball in San Francisco." Former Giants pitcher Will Smith has said that her voice is synonymous with the ballpark, adding that "it's Renel and McCovey Cove", while former Giants player Shawon Dunston noted that he always liked how Brooks-Moon would add excitement during the more critical parts of a game by announcing player names in a tone that seemed to say "Look out!" to the opposing team. Over the years, Renel has lent her voice to numerous historic moments in Giants' history, including the team's three World Series victories in 2010, 2012, and 2014, an experience she described as "Beyond thrilling", "nerve-wracking", "stressful" but also "exciting" and "the most fun". Speaking for herself, Renel has said that she approached her delivery as if she's the fans' host for the evening.

== Departure, reaction, and controversy ==
On March 18, 2024, the Giants announced that they were "mutually and amicably" parting ways with Brooks-Moon, citing difficulties in negotiations regarding a contract extension. However, Brooks-Moon was still listed as a "special advisor" to the Giants. In a press statement, Giants President and CEO Larry Baer said, "Renel has been the familiar and inspirational voice for generations of players and fans at Oracle Park. As an ambassador for the organization and a respected leader, Renel has been a Giant voice in the ballpark and in the community, and will be a Forever Giant."

The Giants' decision to part ways with Brooks-Moon was met with widespread backlash and condemnation from both the national and local media, Giants fans across social media, and even local city leaders.

Ann Killion of the San Francisco Chronicle noted that Brooks-Moon was the team's "most visible non-playing Black employee" and that the ownership had dubbed her "expendable", adding that the move was "bizarre" and a "terrible move for a team whose majority owner Charles B. Johnson funds right-wing politicians who were supportive of undermining a democratic election and who have tried to disenfranchise Black voters across America." Killion also reported that friends of Brooks-Moon had said that she had been pushed out by management due to her public objections to Johnson's political leanings and for her outspoken support of Black Lives Matter.

Grant Brisbee of The Athletic stated that while nobody buys a ticket to hear Brooks-Moon speak, they would "certainly avoid buying tickets if the vibes are off", adding that now that Brooks-Moon was gone, each announcer will now "lean into a microphone and say, 'A reminder: The vibes of this organization are in the toilet.' The words will come out like 'Now pinch-hitting for Pedro Borbón: Manny Mota', but the meaning will be completely different."

Longtime sports TV and radio personality Rod Brooks criticized the timing of the announcement and separation, adding that it was "Either a massive coincidence, or it was done that way on purpose." He further noted that the team should have let her stay for Opening Day so that she could at least introduce the new players and manager for 2024.

Oakland native, social activist and longtime Bishop O'Dowd High School boys basketball coach, Lou Richie, stated that it "would have been nice if they had figured it out, considering that she's such a rarity", adding, "It's like losing Barry Bonds or Mark McGwire, right? You don't want to trade that player away."

Assemblymember Matt Haney (D-San Francisco), posting to his Twitter account, called Killion's op/ed piece "spot on" and added that the decision to part with Brooks-Moon was "absolutely unacceptable from the Giants."

The Giants used several different PA announcers for the 2024 season until the end of July when they settled on her permanent replacement, Carolyn McArdle, the former voice of the Triple-A Sacramento River Cats.

== Recognition, awards and other projects ==
Throughout her career, Renel Brooks-Moon has received numerous accolades for her contributions to sports broadcasting and her impact on the community. In 2000, she was honored with the Bay Area Radio Hall of Fame's "Outstanding Achievement Award." She has also been recognized by organizations such as the Boys & Girls Clubs of America and the National Association of Black Journalists.

On March 18, 2005, California Governor Gavin Newsom proclaimed March 18th in San Francisco to be "Renel-Brooks Moon Day".

In 2017, Brooks-Moon was inducted into the San Francisco State University Alumni Hall of Fame in recognition of her accomplishments in broadcasting and her commitment to mentoring future generations of broadcasters.

Just before the 2024 Major League Baseball season began, the California State Assembly named Brooks-Moon "The Woman of the Year". Matt Haney, the District Supervisor who bestowed Brooks-Moon with the honor proclaimed that she "wasn't just another announcer" and that she "was, and is, an icon in the Bay Area." He added that "You hear her voice and it's so familiar, you can't help but associate her identity with the Giants and the Bay Area as a whole. I am proud to honor her not only for her trailblazing career as an announcer, but also for using her platform to support charities and community advocacy. She's been a leader and an inspiration in everything she's done. Renel opened the door for so many women and for people of color. The broadcasting industry will never be the same."

== Personal life ==
Brooks-Moon resides in the Bay Area. She is known for her philanthropy and community involvement, often lending her time and voice to various charitable causes.

Beyond her work with the Giants, Brooks-Moon has been involved in various community and charitable activities. She has served as a mentor to aspiring broadcasters, particularly women and minorities seeking to break into the industry. Additionally, she has been an advocate for various causes, including breast cancer awareness and youth education initiatives.

== Legacy ==
Brooks-Moon noted that she hoped that her career as a PA announcer would help in "opening up possibilities for young girls" and has actively tried to encourage them to do what she has been doing, adding, "That's absolutely the most rewarding part of this job."

Her career has seemingly helped pave the way for other female announcers in sports. In 2018, the New York Mets hired Marysol Castro to be their new PA announcer in 2018 while the Oakland Athletics hired Amelia Schimmel as their PA announcer in 2021. Schimmel is also the PA voice for the San Jose Sharks minor league team, the San Jose Barracuda. Additionally, Adrienne Roberson became the public female address announcer for the Baltimore Orioles in Major League Baseball in 2021, and is also the first female public address announcer for the Anaheim Ducks of the National Hockey League in 2024.

In 2025, she was asked by Sony to lend her voice to the baseball video game, "MLB: The Show 25" as the PA announcer for all the in-game stadiums, sharing the duties with Baltimore Orioles PA announcer, Adrienne Roberson. Brooks-Moon expressed gratitude for the job, stating “I’m still a part of the game and the sport that I love. It’s my favorite sport. It’s just such a huge blessing — and it’s so much fun.”
