= The 'Lights =

- Starring: David Diamante
- Country of origin: United States
- Original language: English

Production
- Running time: 6 AM - 9 AM ET in 20 minute time blocks
- Production company: NBCUniversal

Original release
- Network: NBC Sports Network
- Release: August 13, 2012 – April 2013

The 'Lights was a daily morning sports highlights program on NBC Sports Network that launched in August 2012. Designed as an alternative to ESPN's SportsCenter, unseen anchor David Diamante narrated the previous day's games and highlights in a half-hour loop. An on-screen sidebar provided information, stats, and comments relevant to the game being highlighted.

Its time-slot expanded from 7-9 AM to 6-9 AM Eastern Time during its short run.

The program was placed on hiatus during the Stanley Cup Playoffs and was scheduled to be re-tooled to re-air in late August 2013. It later was removed from the schedule entirely. Its replacement was a loop of fitness programming under NBCUniversal's digital Radius brand, which aired six times in three hours.

== See also ==
- NBC SportsTalk
- NBCSN
