= Paul Freeman =

Paul Freeman may refer to:

- Paul Freeman (actor) (born 1943), British actor
- Paul Freeman (communist) (died 1921), communist
- Paul Freeman (conductor) (1936–2015), American conductor
- Paul Freeman (cryptozoologist) (1943–2003), American Bigfoot hunter
- Paul Freeman (musician), British singer-songwriter
- Paul L. Freeman Jr. (1907–1988), United States Army general

== See also ==
- Paul Friedman (disambiguation)
