= Madden NFL 21 =

2020 American football video game developed by EA Tiburon

- Current-Gen Standard Edition cover art featuring Lamar Jackson
- Developer: EA Tiburon
- Publisher: EA Sports
- Producer: Ben Haumiller
- Composer: Kris Bowers
- Series: Madden NFL
- Engine: Frostbite 3
- Platforms: Windows; PlayStation 4; Xbox One; PlayStation 5; Xbox Series X/S; Stadia
- Release: Windows, PlayStation 4, Xbox One; August 28, 2020; PlayStation 5, Xbox Series X/S; December 4, 2020; Stadia; January 28, 2021
- Genre: Sports
- Modes: Single-player, multiplayer

Madden NFL 21 is an American football video game based on the National Football League (NFL), developed by EA Tiburon and published by Electronic Arts. It is the 31st installment of the long-running Madden NFL series. It was released for Microsoft Windows, PlayStation 4 and Xbox One on August 28, 2020, and for PlayStation 5 and Xbox Series X/S on December 4, 2020. It features Baltimore Ravens quarterback Lamar Jackson as the cover athlete, and Brandon Gaudin and Charles Davis as its in-game commentators. The game received mixed reviews from critics, who praised its gameplay but criticized its technical issues, while player reception was negative, with many heavily criticizing the lack of innovation.

The online servers for the game shut down on June 30, 2025.

== Development ==
On April 21, 2020, Baltimore Ravens quarterback and 2019 NFL MVP Lamar Jackson revealed he would be the cover athlete. Jackson was the second Ravens player to be cover athlete of a Madden game, after Ray Lewis in Madden NFL 2005. Because of the COVID-19 pandemic, it was not possible to do a standard photo shoot for the game's cover; instead, EA Tiburon contacted Shawn Hubbard, the official team photographer for the Ravens, to provide photos of Jackson for the cover. The game features 18 tracks from artists such as Anderson .Paak, Big K.R.I.T., Rick Ross, Denzel Curry, Yungblud, and Smino. An original score by composer Kris Bowers was included for the Franchise mode, while Yard mode features additional music by Party Favor and Matt Rad. The official soundtrack was released on August 14, 2020. Alan Roach, who has been the PA announcer for the Super Bowl, the Pro Bowl and the NFL International Series, as well as the Minnesota Vikings, will be serving as the announcer.

== Release ==
The game was released on Microsoft Windows, PlayStation 4, and Xbox One on August 28, 2020. The other "special" version of the game was called the MVP edition, which will be available to play three days earlier. The game was officially announced on May 7, 2020, and it was also announced the game would be available on upcoming consoles PlayStation 5 and Xbox Series X/S upon their releases planned on December 4, 2020. The members of the 99 club at launch were Patrick Mahomes, Christian McCaffrey, Michael Thomas, Aaron Donald, and Stephon Gilmore. EA had previously announced that the next installment of Madden NFL would also release on Stadia in winter 2020.

== Gameplay ==
EA Tiburon stated that Madden NFL 21 would include "new innovative gameplay mechanics" that "offer advanced levels of control and inspire creativity on both sides of the ball." The new stick skill ball-carrier system was added, and new pass rush moves were introduced. Changes to tackling and new user-controlled celebrations were also added. This, along with the release date, was revealed in the description of a first-look video originally set to premiere on June 1, but was delayed until June 16 due to the George Floyd protests.

On September 8, EA announced that Colin Kaepernick would be made available to play in the game and sign as a free agent, the first time he appeared in the franchise since Madden NFL 17. The move was met with a mixed response, due in part to Kaepernick being rated an 81 overall, higher than other comparable quarterbacks like Ryan Tannehill (80) and Kyler Murray (77).

The game also features a backyard-style mode known as "The Yard". In addition to the players in the normal game, two-time NBA MVP Giannis Antetokounmpo and his brothers Thanasis and Kostas, also NBA players, are playable characters in this mode. An EA promotional video has the three brothers playing in uniforms inspired by their homeland of Greece. In January 2021, an expansion of SpongeBob SquarePants-themed content was added to The Yard (including a Bikini Bottom-themed "reef-top" stadium, and themed modes and cosmetic items), as a cross-promotion for Nickelodeon's simulcast of a January 10 wild card playoff game.

== Reception ==
=== Critical response ===
Reception

Aggregate scores
Aggregator	Score
Metacritic	(PC) 63/100 (PS4) 63/100 (XONE) 69/100
OpenCritic	18% recommend

Review scores
Publication	Score
Game Informer	7.75/10
GameSpot	6/10
GamesRadar+	3/5
IGN	6.0/10
USgamer	3/5

Madden NFL 21 received mixed reviews from critics, according to review aggregator Metacritic. Fellow review aggregator OpenCritic assessed that the game received weak approval, being recommended by 18% of critics.

IGN gave the game a 6.0/10, criticizing its persistent unfixed issues regarding Franchise mode amongst several neglected features and gameplay bugs, writing: "Despite the fact that Madden NFL 21 features arguably the best core gameplay the series has ever seen and the introduction of a fun new mode in The Yard, the continued neglect shown to classic Franchise mode, lack of innovation across the board, and technical issues leave this gridiron mismatch coming up short." GameSpot also gave the game 6.0/10, praising the new Yard game mode and mechanic updates, but noted the "rampant technical issues and bugs".

GamesRadar+ gave the game 3/5 stars, praising the Yard game mode, as well as the updates to Face of the Franchise, but knocked Franchise, Superstar KO, and Ultimate Team for remaining unchanged. Also giving the game 3/5 stars, USgamer wrote: "Madden 21's gameplay takes some appreciable steps forward as the generation comes to a close, with The Yard providing some casual fun. The experience is marred by an abnormal number of bugs though, and the single-player modes remain a major sore point. Ultimately, it's able to pick up a few yards on the way to the next generation of consoles, but just a few."

Game Informer gave the game a 7.75/10, writing: "Those looking for a huge step forward in the EA Sports' football franchise won't find it with Madden NFL 21. However, despite its lack of major upgrades, Madden NFL 21 is still a mechanically sound and fun football game."

In his review, Forbes contributor Brian Mazique cited the game's "historically low" review scores and said, "While the gameplay is in as good of a spot as it's been for a while, Madden 21 is dragged down but neglected features, stagnant and/or underdeveloped concepts. Hopefully, this inconsistent effort is a product of the development team packing tons into the next-gen version. If not, all things considered, from a reception standpoint, this could be one of the worst years in franchise history."

=== Audience response ===
Player response to Madden NFL 21 has been overwhelmingly negative.

On June 16, 2020, the trailer for Madden NFL 21 was released and panned by reviewers and gamers, who noted no new apparent changes to previous installments and called the game "a $60 roster update". A few days later on June 30, 2020, EA announced some new features to the franchise mode, which were also lamented. Users claim that no changes have been made to the franchise mode in recent years, and took to Twitter to express their frustration. The hashtag "#FixMaddenFranchise" became the most viewed on Twitter in the United States on July 1, 2020, with over 100,000 tweets in 24 hours.

Upon release, the game received an overwhelmingly negative response from Metacritic users, who review bombed the game's entry; the PlayStation 4 release received the lowest ever Metacritic user rating for a game, which was later tied with Diablo Immortal in 2022.

Screen Rant wrote that players were "upset with the lack of changes, the continued gaming bugs that weren't fixed from past installments, and EA's repeated use of microtransactions." Several days after the game's release, the hashtag "#NFLdropEA" was trending on Twitter, with users calling for the NFL to opt-out of its exclusive rights deal with EA Sports. Fox News sports columnist Ryan Gaydos covered the widespread negative player response to the game, writing "The main hitch for gamers was the lack of an in-depth franchise mode, which was beloved in the earlier versions of the game. The Madden team had promised future updates to the mode, but the initial release appeared to have fallen flat with fans."

=== Sales ===
Despite the mixed critical reception and controversy, EA announced that sales of Madden NFL 21 were up 20% compared to the previous year's installment in its first week of release. From August 30 to October 3, 2020, it was the third best-selling game in the U.S.
