= Howie Chizek =

American sports announcer (1947–2012)

- Born: Howard Alan Chizek; June 9, 1947; University Heights, Ohio
- Died: June 16, 2012 (aged 65); Orlando, Florida
- Other name: Howmeister
- Years active: 1974–2012
- Presenting career
- Show: The Howie Chizek Show
- Station: WNIR 100.1 FM
- Time slot: Monday-Friday 10:00 a.m. to 3:00 p.m., Saturday 9:00 a.m. to 12:00 p.m.
- Style: Talk/Call-in
- Country: United States
- Website: www.wnir.com

Howard Alan "Howie" Chizek (June 9, 1947 – June 16, 2012) was an American radio personality, former public address announcer, and philanthropist.

== Career ==
=== Radio ===
Chizek got his start in radio at Youngstown State University in 1964. Then, after a five-year stint at Youngstown's WBBW, Howie Chizek started hosting a talk radio show in the Akron, Ohio, market on WNIR FM-100.1. He began broadcasting with WNIR, then WKNT, on June 3, 1974, and remained there until his death in 2012. Chizek had the longest-running, no-guest talk radio show in America. Throughout that time, the show had included a listenership of over 300,000. It ran six days a week, from Monday through Saturday. His talk show aired 10:00 a.m. to 3:00 p.m. Monday through Friday and 9:00 a.m. to 12:00 p.m. on Saturday. Chizek's success is credited with allowing WNIR to be the first FM station in America to go all-talk in 1979. Listeners heard The Howie Chizek Show for 38 years on-the-air from Cleveland to Canton and, in more recent years, around the world via online streaming.

=== Cleveland Cavaliers ===
Chizek was a former public address announcer for the Cleveland Cavaliers of the National Basketball Association at the Richfield Coliseum where he served throughout much of the 1980s and 1990s. According to the official NBA website, Chizek was given credit as having provided memorable NBA quotes including: "Larry Bird just throws the ball in the air and God moves the basket underneath it.” "Mark Price for tha-ree.” and "Danny Ferry for threeeeeeeeeee."

=== Cleveland Force ===
Chizek was also the former public address announcer for the Cleveland Force (Cleveland Crunch) of the Major Indoor Soccer League where he served throughout much of the 1980s.

=== Other announcing work ===
Throughout the 1970s, Chizek served as the public address announcer for two pro-hockey clubs, the Cleveland Barons and Cleveland Crusaders, and for the Cleveland Nets of World TeamTennis. He served as the announcer for Benedictine High School home football games at Cleveland Heights High School throughout the 1980s, as well.

== Personal life ==
=== Early life ===
Chizek was born in University Heights, Ohio, on June 9, 1947, to Joseph and Sylvia Chizek. He had one brother, Lawrence Chizek. In his younger days, Chizek was a child actor, performing at venues such as Cain Park in Cleveland Heights and the Cleveland Play House.

In 1964, Chizek started a band called The Runaways for which he sang lead and played the guitar. They played the Cleveland and Northeast Ohio area and, in 1965, they recorded a single "I'm a Runaway"/"It Can't Be Long." Chizek wrote both numbers, and "I'm a Runaway" became a hit in Northeast Ohio. The band broke up when Chizek went to college.

In high school, Chizek's powerful voice contributed to the Heights High Choir. After graduation from Cleveland Heights High School in 1965, Chizek received a bachelor's degree in communications from Ohio University in Athens, Ohio. Chizek was later inducted into the Cleveland Heights High School Distinguished Alumni Hall of Fame.

=== Later life ===
Chizek lived in Twinsburg, Ohio, at the time of his death. He previously resided in the Cleveland suburbs of University Heights, Solon and Bedford Heights.

=== Philanthropy ===
Chizek founded several charities, including the Helping Hand program to feed people in Akron and New Adventures youth program. He spent much of his time and money on the New Adventures group whose goal was to mentor young boys as future leaders. He would spend many months of each year coordinating their annual summer trip to Orlando, Florida and would spend time with the boys throughout the rest of the year to foster mentorship and community. For 21 years, he was a volunteer assistant head football and baseball coach at St. Ann's School, later renamed Communion of Saints School, in Cleveland Heights. He was also an umpire in South Euclid baseball leagues for many years.

== Death ==
On June 16, 2012, Chizek suffered a heart attack in Orlando International Airport. He was found unresponsive on a terminal bench. After being transported to Florida Hospital East, he died at 7:40 p.m. from atherosclerotic and hypertensive heart disease, according to the local Medical Examiner's Office. He was en route to the Walt Disney World Resort, taking ten children from the Cleveland Heights area on a summer trip as part of his annual New Adventures charity.

WNIR talk shows were flooded with phone calls in the days following Chizek's death. Although Chizek's burial at Crown Hill Cemetery in Twinsburg was private, his funeral service was broadcast on WNIR.

Preceded by Paul Porter	Cleveland Cavaliers Public Address Announcer; 1984—1995	Succeeded by Jeff Shreve
