= Olivier Sedra =

Olivier Sedra, born in Montréal, Québec, is a public address announcer for the Brooklyn Nets of the National Basketball Association. He was the public address announcer for the 2016 NBA Finals champions Cleveland Cavaliers. His style of announcing is a combination of Lawrence Tanter of the Los Angeles Lakers and his hero, Montreal Canadiens public address announcer Michel Lacroix. He is known for his baritone voice and precise yet exciting announcements.

Sedra, who replaced Ronnie "Slam" Duncan after the 2005-06 NBA season, made his debut as the Quicken Loans Arena voice for Cavs games on October 31, 2006. He was selected to announce basketball games for the 2008 Summer Olympics in Beijing, 2017 NBA All-star practices, 2019 NBA All Star Saturday Night, and the 2020 NBA Bubble (including the 2020 NBA Finals).

When Sedra was the announcer in Cleveland, pregame introductions were handled by the Cavs' "hypeman", Ahmaad Crump, who also served as one of the in-arena hosts at Quicken Loans Arena alongside Nicole Marcellino. However, with the Brooklyn Nets, Sedra handles the pregame introductions himself.

Preceded by Ronnie "Slam" Duncan	Cleveland Cavaliers Public Address Announcer; 2006-2017	Succeeded by Sean Peebles
Preceded by David Diamante	Brooklyn Nets Public Address Announcer; 2017-Present	Succeeded by Current
