= Steve Bitker =

American sportswriter and broadcaster

Steve Bitker (born April 3, 1953) is a retired sports broadcaster. Steve was the morning sports anchor for KCBS All News 740 AM in San Francisco from 1991 to his retirement in 2021.

In addition, Bitker was the backup radio play-by-play announcer for the Oakland Athletics (A's) from 2001 through 2011. Prior to signing on as the A's backup announcer, he was the radio play-by-play announcer for seven years for the minor league Sonoma County Crushers in Rohnert Park.

Bitker has won several broadcasting awards over the years from the Associated Press, the Radio&TV News Directors Association, and the Peninsula Press Club.

He is also the author of one book, The Original San Francisco Giants (Sports Publishing Inc.), which features the Giants' first season in San Francisco and profiles every member of the 1958 Giants.

Bitker is married to former Alameda County Supervisor Alice Lai-Bitker.
