= Jim Hall (announcer) =

American sports announcer (1933–2017)

Jim Hall (May 30, 1933 – June 12, 2017) was an American sports announcer for New York Giants football games at MetLife Stadium, located in East Rutherford, New Jersey.

== Career ==
Hall served as spotter and understudy to legendary New York Yankees and Giants PA announcer Bob Sheppard from the opening of Giants Stadium in 1976 until the beginning of the 2006 season, when he replaced the retiring Sheppard as principal announcer. He held that position until the end of the 2015 season.

Hall met Sheppard when he was in high school, as Sheppard would judge Hall in speech and debate events. Hall, like Sheppard, taught in high school and at St. John's University, where he became the chairman of the Department of Speech, Communication and Theater for twelve years out of a forty-five year tenure, before retiring in 2004.

Hall also served as Sheppard's understudy at Yankee Stadium for many years, beginning in the mid-1960s. He filled in for Sheppard for the 2007 postseason when Sheppard developed bronchitis. For the entire 2008 season, Hall served as the Yankees PA Announcer for their final season at Yankee Stadium, as Sheppard was never able to return. In his one full season as the Yankees PA Announcer, Hall got to call the 2008 MLB All-Star Game and the Yankees last game at Yankee Stadium. Paul Olden took over as the full-time Yankee Stadium announcer when the Yankees moved to their new ballpark in 2009.

Hall's voice was quite similar to Bob Sheppard's. When he filled in for Sheppard, visiting teams and media often did not know that Sheppard was not announcing. This was purposeful, as Hall has said Sheppard asked him to speak in his same style and cadence so as not to distract the fans.

Hall died on June 12, 2017, at the age of 84.

Preceded by Bob Sheppard	Yankee Stadium public address announcer 2008 (interim)	Succeeded by Paul Olden
