= Betty Caywood =

American sportscaster (1931–2020)

- Born: Betty Jean Congour; September 7, 1946; Chicago, Illinois, U.S.
- Died: September 3, 2020 (aged 73); Kansas City, Missouri, U.S.
- Education: University of Missouri; Marymount College (B.A.); Northwestern University (M.A.)
- Occupations: Radio sportscaster; Weather presenter
- Known for: First woman to regularly broadcast Major League Baseball games
- Spouse: Frank Caywood (m. 1951; div. 1957) Jordan Bushman (m. 1965; died 2020)
- Children: 4

Betty Caywood Bushman (born Betty Jean Congour; March 10, 1931 – September 3, 2020) was an American sportscaster. She was one of the first female Major League Baseball broadcasters, providing color commentary on radio broadcasts for the Kansas City Athletics in September 1964.

Caywood had previously worked as a weather reporter on a Chicago television station. On September 16, 1964, she was hired by Athletics' owner Charles Finley to provide a female perspective on the games. Caywood provided color commentary while Monte Moore and George Bryson provided the play-by-play. Baseball author Bill James wrote of Caywood in his 1986 Baseball Abstract "Don't get me wrong, I'm all for having a woman announcer but it would help if she was a baseball fan." She did not return to the broadcasts in 1965.

Born in Chicago, she grew up in Kansas City, Missouri where she graduated from Westport High School in 1948 and then from Marymount College in Salina, Kansas. She later earned a master's degree in speech therapy from Northwestern University.

Caywood, then known as Betty Caywood Bushman, returned to the baseball broadcast booth on August 16, 2008, joining the WHB radio broadcast of games for the independent baseball team, the Kansas City T-Bones.

She died on September 3, 2020, in Kansas City, Missouri.

== See also ==
- Women in baseball
