= Sherry Davis =

American sports announcer

Sherry Davis was the stadium announcer for the San Francisco Giants baseball team from 1993 to 1999. Davis gained immediate attention for becoming the first full-time female stadium announcer for a major league baseball team. Davis, a legal secretary, won the job in an open audition, besting five hundred other candidates. When the Giants relocated from Candlestick Park to the newly constructed AT&T Park (originally named Pacific Bell Park), the Giants declined to renew her contract and replaced her with Renel Brooks-Moon. Papers from Davis' tenure as announcer for the Giants are archived at the Baseball Hall of Fame.

In 2000, Davis became the announcer for the Saint Mary's College of California women's basketball program in Moraga, California.

Davis was born and raised in Virginia, and later graduated from College of Notre Dame of Maryland with a B.A. in Theater. She was an actress in the classics at the Norfolk Theatre Center, 1968–76, when it had taken over the old Norfolk Public Library (Carnegie, 1904).
