= Alan Roach =

American sports announcer

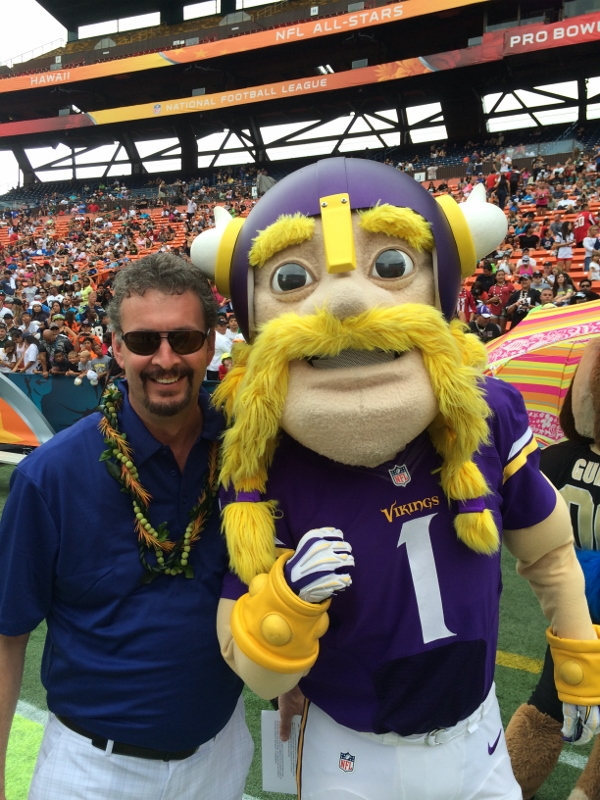
- Roach in 2014
- Born: Kelly James Burnham; March 29, 1966 (age 60); Slayton, Minnesota, U.S.
- Sports commentary career
- Team(s): Minnesota Vikings (2016–present); Colorado Avalanche (1999–present); Colorado Rapids (2016–present); Denver Broncos (2000–2016); Colorado Rockies (1993–2006); Colorado Buffaloes (2007–2009); Denver Pioneers (2004–2005); Colorado Springs SkySox (1990–1991); Denver Grizzlies (1994–1995)
- Sports: Football: Super Bowls XL-XLVII, LI–LX (2006–2013, 2017–present); NFL Pro Bowl: 2009–present NFL International Series: 2007–present Hockey: NCHC Championship 2016; NHL All-Star Game (2001, 2003–2004); NHL Stanley Cup Final (2001 and 2022); Winter Olympic Games: Milano Cortina, Italy 2026; Sochi, Russia 2014; Vancouver, Canada 2010; Torino, Italy 2006; Salt Lake City, United States 2002; Baseball: Pan Am Games – Toronto, Ontario 2015; MLB All–Star Game (1998, 2025-2026); 2019 Inaugural MLB in London Series – London Stadium Soccer: 2018 FIFA World Cup; United States women's national soccer team 2016; MLS All-Stars vs. Tottenham 2015 Rugby: Churchill Cup 2009–2010
- Website: www.alanroach.net

Kelly James Burnham (born March 29, 1966), known professionally as Alan Roach, is an American sports announcer and radio personality. He currently is the public address announcer for the Minnesota Vikings, Colorado Avalanche, and Colorado Rapids. Roach is also the official public address announcer of the Super Bowl, the voice of NFL events worldwide, and a public address announcer at the Olympic Games. He is one of the current voices of the underground train system in Denver International Airport. His announcing credits include 18 Super Bowls, five Olympic gold medal hockey games, and multiple All-Star games for the National Football League, National Hockey League, and Major League Baseball. He also serves as the announcer in EA Sports games since Madden NFL 21, as well as the FIFA series.

== Early life ==
Kelly James Burnham was born on March 29, 1966, in Slayton, Minnesota. He moved from Slayton to Brainerd, Minnesota in ninth grade. Roach began his radio career as a high school student in with KLIZ radio at Brainerd High School. After graduating from BHS in 1984, he began at Southwest Minnesota State University While at SMSU, Burnham began to be called "Little Roach" in reference to his older brother Mark, who had the nickname Roach. When he was asked to come up with a radio name some 20 years later in 1991, he chose Alan Roach. After his first year, he was offered and accepted a full-time job as Sports Director at the radio station on Brainerd, dropping out of school.

== Professional career ==
Burnham's first sports announcing job was as the public address announcer for the Colorado Springs Sky Sox in 1990, having been asked to fill in for the regular PA announcer during a vacation. His full-time gig at the time was on-air at Classic Rocker KKFM going by the name Kelly O'Shea. In 1991, Roach became the afternoon host on KRFX radio in Denver. In 2000, Roach began as morning sports anchor on KOA radio in Denver. He was cut from the position during a downsizing in 2015.

=== Baseball ===
Roach was hired as the public address announcer for the Colorado Rockies prior to the first game they played as a franchise in 1993. Roach served as PA announcer for every home game in Mile High Stadium and later Coors Field through the 2006 MLB season.

=== Hockey ===
Roach began as public address announcer for the Colorado Avalanche with their first game played in Pepsi Center for the 1999–2000 season. On June 9, 2001, Roach missed the Rockies game to announce the historic Stanley Cup Game Seven win over the New Jersey Devils. He announced the post-game ceremony in which Joe Sakic famously handed the Stanley Cup to Ray Bourque. As of 2017, Roach continues as the public address announcer for the Avalanche. He was also the public address announcer for the Denver Grizzlies' only season in the International Hockey League from 1994 to 1995 during their Turner Cup-winning season, providing Roach with his first Championship Ring. The Colorado Avalanche hosted the 2001 NHL All-Star game. Roach served as PA announcer for that game and the following NHL All-star games in Sunrise, Florida in 2003 and in St. Paul, Minnesota in 2004.

Roach also served as English-speaking public address announcer for all men's Olympic hockey games at the E-Center in Salt Lake City, Utah for the 2002 Winter Olympic Games. Roach also announced hockey in Turin, Italy at the 2006 Winter Olympic Games at Torino Palasport Olimpico. Roach was also heard in Canada Hockey Place in Vancouver announcing men's and women's games at the 2010 Winter Olympic Games. Roach announced the Canadian women's gold medal win over Team USA on February 25, 2010. Roach was in Sochi, Russia, announcing for the 2014 Olympic Winter Games hockey.

=== Football ===
Roach began as the Denver Broncos PA announcer in 2000.

Roach handled public address announcing duties for Super Bowls from 2006 to 2013, starting with Super Bowl XL in Detroit through Super Bowl XLVII in New Orleans, Louisiana. Roach did not announce the 2014 Super Bowl, as the NFL cited a potential competitive advantage for the Broncos having their regular P.A. announcer be the announcer at the Super Bowl. The same situation presented itself in 2016, as the Denver Broncos played the Carolina Panthers in Super Bowl 50. Roach resumed PA duties at Super Bowl LI in 2017. Roach is heard regularly at league events like the NFL Draft, Pro Football Hall of Fame Induction Ceremony, NFL International Series in London, England, Pro Bowl, and the Super Bowl.

On June 27, 2016, it was announced that Roach would become the PA announcer at newly completed U.S. Bank Stadium for the Minnesota Vikings. Born in Minnesota, Roach has been a lifelong Vikings fan.

=== Other work ===
In addition to sports announcing, Roach has done work for other voice-over projects, such as the underground train system at Denver International Airport. In 2019, he served as the voice of London Stadium for the 2019 MLB London series between the Boston Red Sox and the New York Yankees. He also became the announcer of EA Sports' Madden NFL series since Madden NFL 21, (Note: Super Bowl only since Madden NFL 23) as well as the FIFA series.

== Personal life ==
Roach and his wife, Jennifer, have two children. He lives in Denver and flies to Minnesota for his Vikings announcement duties. He has stated that he is a fan of English football club Crystal Palace.
