= Jeff Shreve =

American announcer (born 1965)

- Born: May 14, 1965 (age 61); Canton, Ohio
- Sports commentary career
- Teams: Cleveland Browns 1999 - present; Mid-American Conference 2000 - present; University of Akron 2006 - present; Canton Charge 2011 - 2020; Cleveland Cavaliers 1987 - 2005; Cleveland Rockers 1997 - 2003

Jeff Shreve is an American public address announcer for the Cleveland Browns of the National Football League, University of Akron football and men's basketball, the Mid-American Conference and the former public address announcer of the Cleveland Cavaliers of the National Basketball Association and the Canton Charge of the NBA G League.

Shreve was born in Canton, Ohio. He left GlenOak High School in 1983 and is a graduate of the University of Mount Union (1987).

Shreve became a full-time public address announcer at the beginning of the second season of Gund Arena in the 1995-96 NBA season. He was the voice of the 1997 NBA All-Star Game and the "NBA at 50" halftime ceremony honoring the 50 Greatest Players in NBA History. He was replaced by Ronnie Duncan after the 2004-05 NBA season as part of the team overhaul by the new owner, Dan Gilbert.

In 1999, Shreve was hired as the internal public address announcer for the Cleveland Browns and replaced Jim Mueller as the full-time stadium announcer in 2000.

Shreve was the public address announcer for the Cleveland Rockers of the WNBA for all of their seven seasons (1997–2003). He has also been the announcer for the Mid-American Conference men's and women's basketball tournaments since 2000 and the Mid-American Conference Football Championship game since 2012.

Preceded by Jim Mueller	Cleveland Browns Public Address Announcer; 2000–present	Succeeded by

Preceded by Howie Chizek	Cleveland Cavaliers Public Address Announcer; 1995–2005	Succeeded by Ronnie Duncan
