= Red Rush =

American sportscaster

Rush

Wresley "Red" Rush II (July 2, 1927 – January 11, 2009) was an American sportscaster.

A native of Long Beach, California, Rush (nicknamed for his shock of red hair) attended the University of Southern California where he developed his interest in broadcasting. Rush did play-by-play for several Major League Baseball teams, including the Kansas City A's (1965), Chicago White Sox (1967–70), Oakland A's (1971, 1979–80), and St. Louis Cardinals (1984).

With the White Sox, and with the 1971 A's, Rush worked with Hall of Fame voice Bob Elson, providing raw enthusiasm and excitement to the broadcast in contrast to the more laconic Elson. It is said that A's owner Charlie Finley hired and fired Rush three times.

From the '60s to the late '80s, Rush was the voice of the Loyola University Ramblers men's college basketball team, and made the famous call of their 1963 NCAA National Championship ("WE WIN! WE WIN!"). He also called games for Northwestern University football, DePaul University basketball, the Chicago Cougars of the World Hockey Association (TV only) and the Minneapolis Lakers and Golden State Warriors of the NBA.
