= Paul Olden =

American sportscaster (born 1954)

Paul Olden (born 1954) is the public address announcer for the New York Yankees of Major League Baseball, a position he has held since the team moved to the present-day Yankee Stadium in 2009.

== Early life and career ==
Born in Chicago, Olden moved with his family to Los Angeles as a child. He attended Dorsey High School and Los Angeles City College. Olden was formerly a radio and television play-by-play announcer for the Yankees, Tampa Bay Devil Rays, California Angels, Cleveland Indians, Philadelphia Eagles, UCLA Bruins, Los Angeles Rams, New York Jets, New Jersey Nets, and ESPN.

Olden was the target of Los Angeles Dodgers manager Tommy Lasorda's infamous and profanity laden "Dave Kingman tirade" in 1978, in which Lasorda ranted at Olden (who worked at Los Angeles radio station KLAC at the time) when he asked him about Kingman having hit three home runs against the Dodgers that day. He was also the PA announcer for 13 consecutive Super Bowls from 1993 to 2005.

== New York Yankees ==
Olden replaced Jim Hall, the successor to Bob Sheppard, who had been the Yankees announcer since 1951.

Between April 16, 2009 and July 10, 2025, Olden announced 1,339 consecutive games, before missing a series for his grandnephew's wedding. This included every regular and postseason game played at the new Yankee Stadium until that point.

Preceded by Jim Hall (interim)	Yankee Stadium public address announcer 2009 –	Succeeded by (current)
