= Gene Honda =

American sports announcer

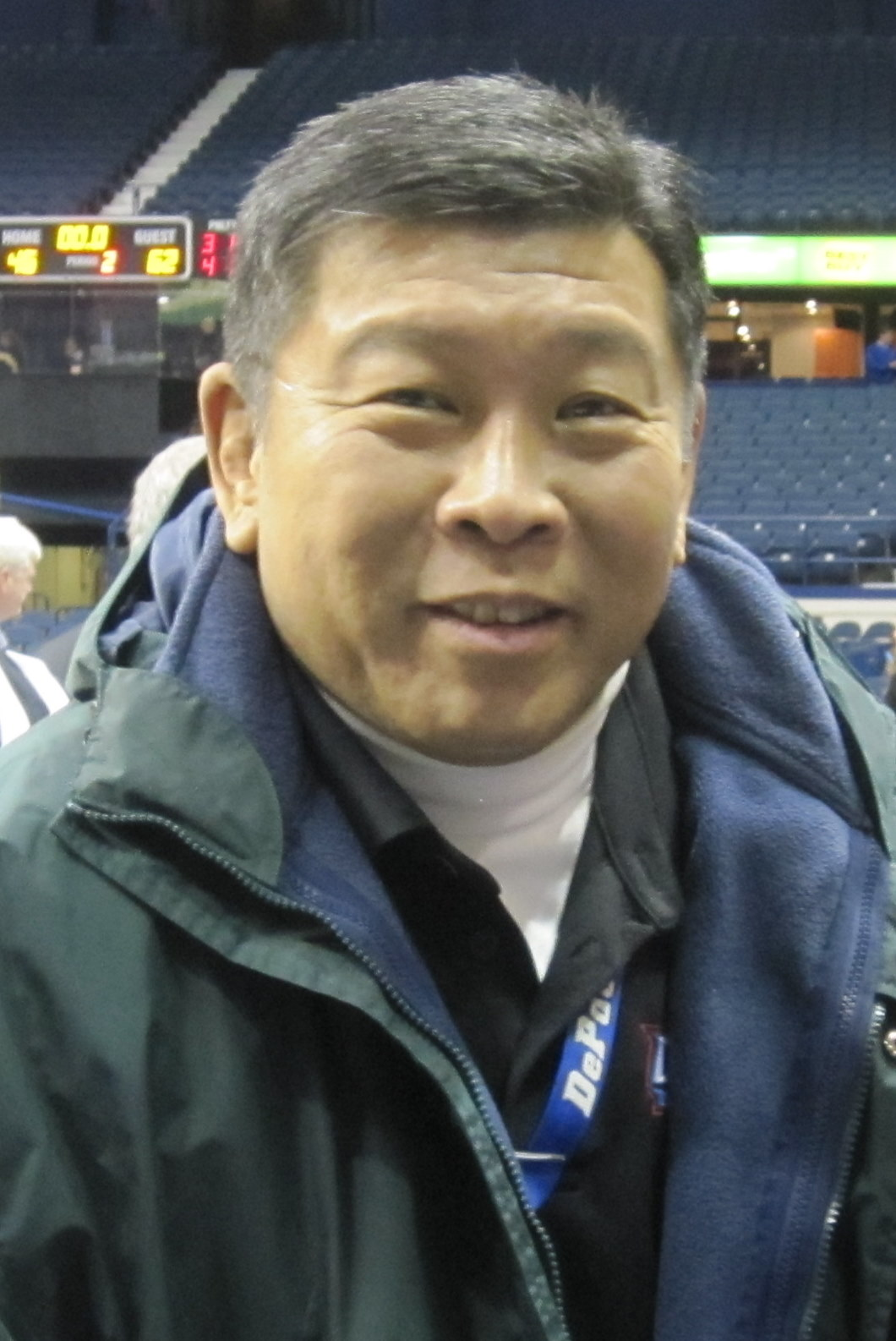
- Honda at the Allstate Arena in 2010

Eugene "Gene" Honda is a public address announcer for the Chicago White Sox (starting in 1985, full-time since 1991), Chicago Blackhawks (succeeding Harvey Wittenberg since the 2001–02 season), DePaul Blue Demons basketball, Big Ten tournament, Illinois Fighting Illini football (since 2012), and the NCAA Final Four (2003-2024). He is also a constant voice on Chicago's PBS station WTTW Channel 11, the Big Ten Network, and the Chicago Marathon. He formerly worked for radio station WLAK (now WLIT) in Chicago. Honda was the PA announcer for the 2009 NHL Winter Classic on January 1 at Wrigley Field. Additionally, he was the PA announcer for the 2012 Frozen Four at the Tampa Bay Times Forum.

Honda is the only person to have announced at the MLB World Series, MLB All Star Game, NHL Stanley Cup Playoffs, NCAA Final Four, and NCAA Frozen Four.

Honda was born and raised on Chicago's north side to Japanese American parents. He attended Senn High School and graduated in 1972. He later attended University of Illinois Urbana-Champaign where he studied engineering, finance, and broadcasting. Honda spent the next 18 years working at the University of Illinois' radio station, WPGU. Honda's interest in broadcasting was sparked by his father, who wanted his son to improve his public speaking skills.

Honda appeared briefly in the 1990 film Opportunity Knocks as Mr. Nimoku.

Honda also is a teacher for the After School Matters (ASM) Sports Broadcasting program at Curie High School.

On October 11, 2008, Honda was inducted into the Illini Media Alumni Hall of Fame.

Honda also appeared as the "Shoot the Puck announcer" in the 2011 film The Dilemma alongside Kevin James and Vince Vaughn.
