= Bob Sheppard =

American sports announcer (1910–2010)

- Sheppard in 2000
- Born: Robert Leo Sheppard; October 20, 1910; New York City, U.S.
- Died: July 11, 2010 (aged 99); Baldwin, New York, U.S.
- Other name: "The Voice of God"
- Education: St. John's College
- Occupation: Public address announcer
- Years active: 1951–2007

Robert Leo Sheppard (October 20, 1910 – July 11, 2010) was an American sports announcer who was the long-time public address announcer for numerous New York area college and professional sports teams, in particular the New York Yankees of Major League Baseball (1951–2007), and the New York Giants of the National Football League (1956–2006).

Sheppard announced more than 4,500 Yankees baseball games over a period of 56 years, including 22 pennant-winning seasons and 13 World Series championships; he called 121 consecutive postseason contests, 62 games in 22 World Series, and six no-hitters, including three perfect games. He was also the in-house voice for New York Giants football games for more than a half-century, encompassing nine conference championships, three NFL championships (1956, 1986, 1990), and the game often called "the greatest ever played", the classic 1958 championship loss to Baltimore.

His smooth, distinctive baritone and precise, consistent elocution became iconic aural symbols of both the old Yankee Stadium and Giants Stadium. Reggie Jackson famously nicknamed him "The Voice of God", and Carl Yastrzemski once said, "You're not in the big leagues until Bob Sheppard announces your name."

== Early life ==
St. John's College Football Team 1929

Sheppard was secretive about his age throughout his life, but according to New York voter records he was born October 20, 1910, in Richmond Hill, Queens, New York City. He graduated from St. John's Preparatory School in 1928 (at that time in Brooklyn, New York, currently in Astoria, Queens) and attended St. John's College on an athletic scholarship, where he earned seven varsity letters from 1928 to 1932; three in baseball as the starting first baseman, and four in football as the left-handed starting quarterback. He was also elected president of his senior class.

== Teacher ==
Sheppard began his career playing semiprofessional football on Long Island with the Valley Stream Red Riders and the Hempstead Monitors, earning $25 a game, and teaching speech at Grover Cleveland High School in Ridgewood, Queens, New York. During World War II he served in the Navy as a gunnery officer aboard cargo ships, both in convoys and on independent missions in the Pacific Theater. After the War, he became Chairman of the Speech Department at John Adams High School in Queens, and taught evening courses in public speaking at his alma mater, St. John's University. He also served as speech and debate coach for Sacred Heart Academy's Forensic Team in Hempstead, New York. His multiple teaching jobs overlapped more than 25 years into his announcing career, and he always maintained that his academic work was far more important than his accomplishments as an announcer. "My sports activity", he said,"...cut down on what I really contributed to society, and that's teaching...when I hear from former students and they say I helped them achieve their goals, I feel I have contributed to society more than all I have done in sports." As an announcer, he said, "All I have to recommend is longevity."

== Announcer ==
After World War II, Sheppard was hired as the public address announcer for St. John's football and basketball games, a job he kept well into the 1990s. In the late 1940s, he became the announcer for the Brooklyn Dodgers of the All-America Football Conference at Ebbets Field. He came to the attention of the Yankees when a front-office official heard him deliver a tribute to Babe Ruth at a Dodgers football game in 1948. He was offered the Yankees announcing job, but did not accept it until three years later when the Yankees agreed to hire an understudy, so that his duties with the team would not interfere with his teaching responsibilities.

Sheppard's first year as the Yankees' announcer was the only one in which Joe DiMaggio and Mickey Mantle shared the outfield. His first game featured eight future Hall of Famers: DiMaggio, Mantle, Johnny Mize, Yogi Berra, and Phil Rizzuto for the Yankees, and Ted Williams, Bobby Doerr, and Lou Boudreau for the Red Sox. The first player he introduced was the Yankee Clipper's brother, Dominic DiMaggio. His 1951 salary was $15 per game (equivalent to $186 in 2025), $17 for a doubleheader (equivalent to $211 in 2025).

"A public-address announcer should be clear, concise, correct. He should not be colorful, cute or comic."

— Bob Sheppard

Sheppard's distinctive announcing style became an integral component of the Yankee Stadium experience. For more than half a century each game began with his trademark cadence – "Good afternoon (evening)...ladies and gentlemen...and welcome...to Yankee Stadium" – his words reverberating around the massive structure. Each in-game announcement began: "Your attention please, ladies and gentlemen." He introduced every player, Yankee or visitor (as described on his Monument Park plaque), "with equal divine reverence." He communicated the players' position, uniform number, name, and repeated the number, during his first at-bat ("Now batting for the Yankees, the first baseman, number 23, Don Mattingly, number 23"), while announcing the players' position and name during each succeeding at-bat ("The first baseman, Don Mattingly"). He eschewed flamboyant nicknames; Dennis Boyd was never introduced as "Oil Can", nor Jim Hunter as "Catfish." He once listed (in order) his favorite names to announce: Mickey Mantle, Shigetoshi Hasegawa, Salomé Barojas, José Valdivielso and Álvaro Espinoza; and he expressed his special affection for the natural resonance of many Latino players' names. "Anglo-Saxon names are not very euphonious", he said. "What can I do with Steve Sax? What can I do with Mickey Klutts?" But Mickey Mantle remained his favorite; Sheppard said Mantle once told him, "'Every time Bob Sheppard introduced me at Yankee Stadium, I got shivers up my spine.' And I said to him, 'So did I.'"

Sheppard took great pride in pronouncing every name correctly, and made certain to check directly with a visiting player if he had any doubt on the correct or preferred pronunciation. He admitted that early in his career, whenever the Senators were in town he particularly feared tripping over Wayne Terwilliger's name. "I worried that I would say 'Ter-wigg-ler'", he recalled, "but I never did." He did stumble on at least one rookie's name: Jorge Posada was called up from Columbus late in the 1995 season, and made his first appearance as a Yankee in Game 2 of the 1995 American League Division Series against the Seattle Mariners, as a pinch runner for Wade Boggs. Sheppard, who had not yet met Posada, announced the substitution, Posada's major league debut, in extra innings of one of the greatest games in Division Series history, with an "o" at the end of his last name. Posada's friend Derek Jeter noticed immediately, with amusement, and has called him "Sado" ever since.

Sheppard made another rare professional error in October 1976 at the Giants' first home game in New Jersey at Giants Stadium against the Dallas Cowboys, which he commenced with the startling announcement, "Ladies and gentlemen, welcome to Yankee Stadium." His other famous faux pas occurred in 1982 at Yankee Stadium, when he inadvertently left his microphone on as Shane Rawley gave up a double on his first pitch in relief, instantly turning a 3–2 lead into a 4–3 deficit. Over the stadium speakers came Sheppard's familiar voice: "Boy, what relief pitching!" Sheppard, ever the gentleman, went to the locker room after the game and apologized to Rawley.

Throughout his career, Sheppard famously refused to reveal his age, once abruptly ending an interview when Jim Bouton asked the question a second time. He readily disclosed his birth month and day, October 20 (possibly because he shared it with Mickey Mantle), but never publicly acknowledged the year. For years, there was conjecture that his compulsive secretiveness stemmed from a fear that Yankees owner George Steinbrenner would think him too old and replace him, but Sheppard denied it. "[Steinbrenner] never questioned how old I was", he said. "He knew I was there every day for 57 years or so." In fact, it has been said that Sheppard may have been the only Yankees employee never criticized by Steinbrenner, who called him "the gold standard."

Over the years, Sheppard also served as announcer for multiple other teams and venues, among them Adelphi College (predecessor of Adelphi University); the New York Titans of the American Football League, and the International Soccer League, both at the Polo Grounds; the WFL New York Stars at Downing Stadium on Randall's Island; the All-America Football Conference's New York Yankees at Yankee Stadium; the NASL New York Cosmos at Yankee Stadium, Downing Stadium, and Giants Stadium; Army Black Knights football games at Michie Stadium and Giants Stadium; and multiple Army-Navy games at the Polo Grounds, Giants Stadium, and Veterans Stadium in Philadelphia. "You name it, I did it", he said. In later years, the many baseball honors bestowed on him overshadowed his work in other sports. Phil Rizzuto once asked him to name the greatest Yankee Stadium game he had ever announced, probably expecting to hear a good baseball story. "The day Pat Summerall kicked the field goal in the snow in 1958", Sheppard replied, referring to the legendary December 14 Giants victory over Cleveland.

== Retirement ==
Sheppard retired from his position with the Giants, a 50-year handshake agreement with Giants owner Wellington Mara, at the end of the 2005 season, when the commute from his home on Long Island to East Rutherford, New Jersey became too strenuous. His final game was the Giants' playoff loss to the Carolina Panthers on January 8, 2006. He was succeeded by his long-time understudy, former debate student, and colleague in the Speech Department at St. John's University, Jim Hall.

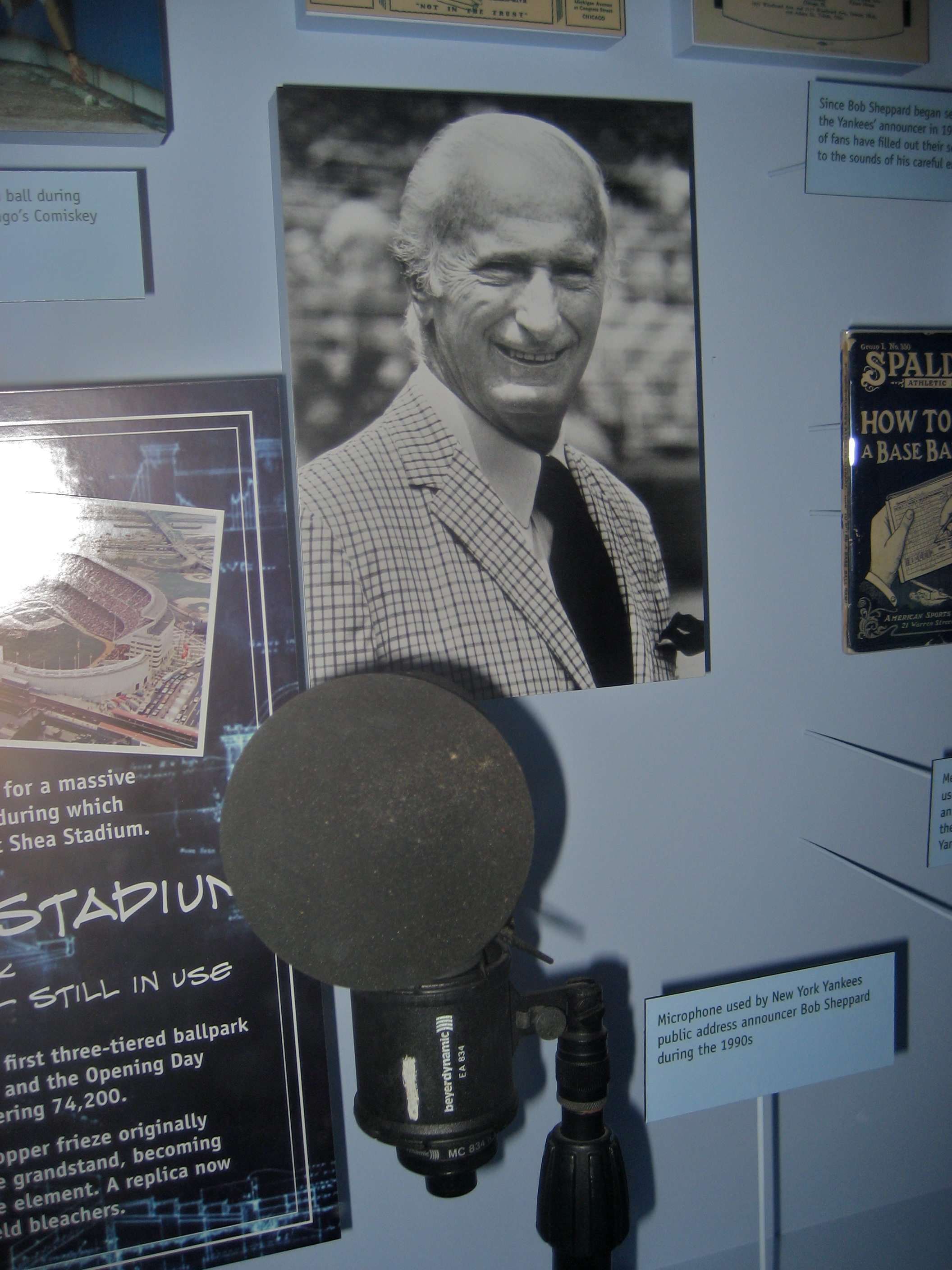
Sheppard's microphone in the Baseball Hall of Fame

At age 95, health issues began to take their toll: In 2006, Sheppard missed his first Yankees home opener since 1951 after injuring his hip. He was back in time for the next homestand, but it marked the beginning of a slow but inexorable deterioration of his health over the next two seasons. He called what turned out to be his final game, a 10–2 win over Seattle, on September 5, 2007. The last player he introduced was the Mariners' Ben Broussard, who made the final out of the game. The following week, he was hospitalized with a bronchial infection, forcing him to miss the final homestand and the AL Division Series against Cleveland, thus ending his streak of 121 consecutive postseason games at Yankee Stadium. Although he signed a new two-year contract with the Yankees in March 2008, and he particularly looked forward to announcing the 2008 All-Star Game, which was played at Yankee Stadium, he missed the entire 2008 season. He also reluctantly admitted that he lacked sufficient strength to call the final game at the original ballpark on September 21, 2008. "I don't have my best stuff", he said. Sheppard's recorded voice did announce the starting lineups for that final game, a 7–3 victory over the Baltimore Orioles. Jim Hall replaced him for the 2008 season, and Paul Olden took over when the Yankees moved to the new ballpark in 2009.

Two weeks after his 99th birthday in 2009, the day after the Yankees defeated Philadelphia to win their 27th World Series, Sheppard officially announced his retirement as the Yankees' public address announcer. "I have no plans of coming back", he told MLB.com. "Time has passed me by, I think. I had a good run for it. I enjoyed doing what I did. I don't think, at my age, I'm going to suddenly regain the stamina that is really needed if you do the job and do it well."

== Death ==
Sheppard died at his home in Baldwin, New York, on July 11, 2010, at the age of 99. In announcing his father's death, Sheppard's son Paul said, "I know St. Peter will now recruit him. If you're lucky enough to go to Heaven, you'll be greeted by a voice saying, 'Good afternoon, ladies and gentlemen. Welcome to Heaven!'"

== Legacy ==
Sheppard's plaque at Monument Park

In 2000, during his 50th year with the Yankees, Sheppard donated the microphone he used for a half-century of Yankee Stadium announcements to the Baseball Hall of Fame in Cooperstown, New York. May 7 of that 50th year was designated "Bob Sheppard Day", and a plaque honoring him was unveiled in Yankee Stadium's Monument Park. At the pre-game ceremony Walter Cronkite read the inscription, which states in part that his voice was "...as synonymous with Yankee Stadium as its copper facade and Monument Park." The media dining room in the new stadium is named "Sheppard's Place".

The Yankees' first home game after Sheppard's death, a 5–4 victory over the Tampa Bay Rays on July 16, 2010, was played with an empty public address booth and no announcements. The Yankees wore a Bob Sheppard commemorative patch on the left sleeve of their home and road jerseys for the remainder of the 2010 season.

The United States House of Representatives passed a resolution "commending Bob Sheppard for his long and respected career" by voice vote on November 16, 2010. It was introduced by Carolyn McCarthy from New York's 4th congressional district, where Sheppard lived for 70 years.

In 2008, Derek Jeter asked Sheppard to record his at-bat introductions. The recordings were used to introduce Jeter's home at-bats from the beginning of the 2008 season until his final game at Yankee Stadium on September 25, 2014. Sheppard was flattered: "It has been one of the greatest compliments I have received in my career of announcing. The fact that he wanted my voice every time he came to bat is a credit to his good judgment and my humility." Sheppard's recorded voice also introduced Jeter at the 2010 All-Star Game in Anaheim two days after Sheppard's death. Sheppard voices the introduction to The Baseball Experience at the National Baseball Hall of Fame in Cooperstown.

On September 26, 2013, a recording of Sheppard's introduction, followed by Metallica's "Enter Sandman", were played as Mariano Rivera stepped to the mound at Yankee Stadium for the final time.

=== Awards ===
Sheppard was elected to the St. John's University Sports Hall of Fame, the Long Island Sports Hall of Fame, and the New York Sports Hall of Fame. He was awarded honorary doctorates from St. John's University (Pedagogy) and Fordham University (Rhetoric), and in 2007, received St. John's' Medal of Honor, the highest award that the university can confer on a graduate.

St. John's University annually awards the Sheppard Trophy, one of its highest awards, to the most outstanding student-athlete. The National Association of Sports Public Address Announcers presents the Bob Sheppard P.A. Announcer of the Year Award annually.

In 1998, Sheppard was presented with the prestigious William J. Slocum "Long and Meritorious Service" Award by the Baseball Writers' Association of America, and the "Pride of the Yankees" award by the Yankees organization.

In 2010, Sheppard was one of only two people ever awarded both a World Series ring and a Super Bowl ring. The other was Bill King, the long-time radio play-by-play voice of the Oakland Raiders and Oakland Athletics.

== Personal life ==
Sheppard was married twice. He had two sons, Paul and Chris, and two daughters, Barbara and Mary, four grandchildren and (as of 2008) nine great-grandchildren. His first wife, Margaret, the mother of all four of his children, died in 1959. He and his second wife, Mary, were married from 1961 until his death.

Sheppard was deeply religious, "...as strong in his Roman Catholic faith as anybody I knew", wrote his longtime friend, George Vecsey. "[In old age] he hated to admit he could no longer serve as a lector. His faith never wavered in the trying days. His daughter [Mary] is a nun. He referred to [his wife] Mary as 'my archangel,' meaning she saved his life, day by day."

Preceded by Red Patterson	Yankee Stadium public address announcer 1951–2007	Succeeded by Jim Hall (interim)
