= Dick Callahan =

American public address announcer (1940–2021)

- Born: November 11, 1940; Scranton, Pennsylvania, U.S.
- Died: January 29, 2021 (aged 80)
- Education: St. Jerome's College (BA)
- Occupations: Insurance businessman; Public address announcer

Richard J. Callahan (November 11, 1940 – January 29, 2021) was an American public address announcer. He was noted for serving as the PA announcer for the Oakland Athletics from 2005 until 2019. Prior to that, he was the announcer for the Golden State Warriors, the California Golden Bears football, and various sports at Saint Mary's College of California.

== Early life ==
Callahan was born in Scranton, Pennsylvania, on November 11, 1940. His parents were Richard and Margaret Callahan, and he attended Scranton Preparatory School. In grade seven, one of the nuns teaching him there remarked how he had "a nice voice and good reading pace", and encouraged him to make good use of it in the future. He graduated in 1958, and – intending to become a priest – he went on to study Latin at St. Jerome's College in Waterloo, Ontario. Callahan played for the Waterloo Warriors men's basketball team, but described his time there as unremarkable, joking that he "led the team in minutes sat". He was forced to quit the team in his junior year after simultaneously injuring both of his ankles. He nonetheless continued to attend Warriors games as a spectator. At one of these games, the public address (PA) announcer did not show up and Callahan volunteered to take his place. The athletic director, Carl Totzke, asked him if he had any prior experience in announcing. Callahan replied that he announced all the games at his high school, even though he had actually never announced a game before. Totzke was satisfied with Callahan's performance throughout that game that he was retained as announcer, while the incumbent announcer was dismissed.

Callahan graduated with a Bachelor of Arts from St. Jerome's in 1962. He had a brief stint working for MetLife in New York City, before going back home to Scranton and serving as PA announcer for the Scranton Miners.

== Career ==
Callahan relocated to St. Louis as part of his work with MetLife. There, he became friends with broadcaster Jack Buck. Callahan applied to become radio announcer for the Spirits of St. Louis when the position opened, but ultimately lost out to Bob Costas. He subsequently moved to California and established Callahan Insurance in 1981. It would later merge with another agency in 1993 to become Kosich & Callahan Insurance Services.

=== Saint Mary's College ===
Callahan was approached by the athletic director and sports information director of Saint Mary's College of California in 1975 about becoming the PA announcer for its football and basketball games. He began announcing games for the college that year. He went on to participate in college life outside of sport, serving on its Board of Regents and establishing a scholarship for Latino students in need. He received an honorary degree from the college in 1998, and joked that he "love[d] Saint Mary's more than my own collegiate alma mater" of St. Jerome's. In lieu of payment for announcing, Callahan was given four free tickets each game for his family, who were able to sit close by to him. He quit as announcer in around 2008 after those seats were sold to another party.

=== Golden State Warriors ===
Callahan joined the Golden State Warriors as PA announcer in 1981. He served in that capacity for 19 seasons until 2000. He underwent heart surgery in 1995. Consequently, he was absent for seven games, and in his two decades with the team, he missed a total of 13 games out of around 750 NBA games. He was notably the announcer for the 2000 NBA All-Star Game, which was hosted in Oakland that February. He suddenly resigned later that year after he was falsely accused of threatening a public relations intern. The intern had spilled water on Callahan and refused to clean it up when instructed to do so, leading to Callahan calling for the intern's dismissal. Robert Rowell, the Warriors president, took the side of the intern and Callahan quit accordingly. Rowell only discovered two weeks later, from a security guard who had observed the confrontation, that it was in fact Callahan who had been threatened. Callahan described his role with the Warriors as his "dream job" and believed the organization "wanted a screamer".

=== Oakland Athletics ===
Callahan became the PA announcer for the Oakland Athletics in 2005. He succeeded Roy Steele, who was forced to step down in September that year due to achalasia. Although he had big shoes to fill – his predecessor was dubbed "the Voice of God" by fans – Callahan himself became an endeared figure. He identified Dallas Braden's perfect game in 2010 and Sean Manaea's no-hitter in 2018 as the two most memorable games with the team. Incidentally, the 1,000th game Callahan announced for the Athletics was Mike Fiers' no-hitter on May 7, 2019.

== Later life ==
Callahan and his wife, Patricia, divorced. He moved to Rossmoor before the COVID-19 pandemic, after having residing in Moraga for 42 years. He intended to announce for the Athletics during the shortened 2020 Major League Baseball season, despite the fact that there would be no fans in attendance due to the pandemic. However, he decided to take a one-year hiatus just before the start of the season in July, after being treated in the emergency department for fluid buildup in his legs and abdomen. Amelia Schimmel stood in for him as announcer, and Callahan declared his intention to return for the 2021 season.

Callahan died on January 29, 2021, at the age of 80. No cause of death was announced.
