= Ken Korach =

American sportscaster (born 1952)

- Born: January 30, 1952 (age 74); Los Angeles, California, U.S.
- Education: San Diego State University (attended); University of California, Santa Barbara (B.A.)
- Occupation: Sports commentator
- Years active: 1980–present
- Employer: Athletics
- Style: Play-by-play
- Spouse: Denise Korach (née Moran)
- Children: 1
- Awards: Nevada Sportscaster of the Year (2001); Nevada Broadcasters Hall of Fame (2003); California Sportscaster of the Year (2013)

Kenneth Louis Korach (born January 30, 1952) is an American sports commentator for the Athletics of Major League Baseball and a published author.

== Early life and education ==
Korach was born in Los Angeles in 1952. He went on to attend San Diego State University for college, where he worked on the school's newspaper, before he transferred to the University of California, Santa Barbara. He graduated from UC Santa Barbara in 1975 with a B.A. in Social Sciences.

== Broadcasting career ==
Korach started his broadcasting career in 1980 for KTOB in Petaluma, California, where he was involved with high school sports. In 1981, he joined California League team Redwood Pioneers and broadcast on KSRO on a part-time basis, eventually becoming full-time with them in 1984. While with the Pioneers, he joined Sonoma State University in 1982 where he broadcast Seawolves' football and basketball games.

Korach joined San Jose State University in 1985, and broadcast for the San Jose State Spartans football and men's basketball teams. For a brief period, Korach also served on the Pacific Coast League's Phoenix Firebirds broadcast crew from 1986 to 1987. From 1989 to 1991, he was with another PCL team, the Las Vegas Stars.

In 1992, Korach made several professional leaps. He joined the University of Nevada, Las Vegas to broadcast UNLV Rebels football and basketball games. He remained with the football team through 1995 and continued with the basketball team until 2004. 1992 also saw Korach make his debut in Major League Baseball, when he joined the Chicago White Sox broadcasting team. He worked mainly weekend games for the White Sox when John Rooney traveled to call the CBS Radio Game of the Week.

Korach joined the Oakland Athletics in 1996, replacing long-time sportscaster Lon Simmons. Working alongside Bill King, whom Korach regarded as a childhood hero, and former MLB catcher and color commentator Ray Fosse, the Oakland Athletics radio team was ranked as the second-best crew in the American League by USA Today. Korach was promoted to lead announcer for the Athletics after the 2005 season to replace King, who died in October 2005.

Korach is the author of Holy Toledo – Lessons from Bill King: Renaissance Man of the Mic (ISBN 9780985419042), a biography of his former broadcasting partner Bill King. It was released in September 2013 by Wellstone Books, and features contributions from longtime San Francisco Giants lead broadcaster Jon Miller.

Korach co-authored his second book with Susan Slusser of the San Francisco Chronicle, If These Walls Could Talk, Oakland A’s, published by Triumph Books in March of 2019.

Beginning in the 2023 season Korach reduced his schedule, calling only home games and games on the West Coast.

=== Perfect game call ===
On May 9, 2010, Korach was the commentator for the conclusion of A's pitcher Dallas Braden's perfect game. Korach told Las Vegas Review-Journal columnist Ron Kantowski that although everyone in the ballpark was aware of what was going on, the words "perfect game" weren't used in the broadcast until the eighth inning. At the game's conclusion, Korach said, "A PERFECT GAME! Dallas Braden has thrown a perfect game! The A's have beaten Tampa Bay, four to nothing! The kid from Stockton has done it for the A's!"

== A's Winning for the Community ==
Korach is the founder of the Oakland Athletics' "A's Winning for the Community" program. He had previously heard of trouble at Oakland Technical High School, the alma mater of former A's outfielder and National Baseball Hall of Fame and Museum member Rickey Henderson. He donated $5,000 to the Field of Dreams project, which ultimately succeeded, and Korach gave the dedication speech on April 4, 2008.

Feeling he could do more for the Oakland, California community, Korach met with Athletics executives and created the "A's Winning for the Community" program. Korach and the Athletics donate money to members of the Oakland Athletic League's baseball programs, which involve schools from the Oakland Unified School District, after each Athletics victory.

== Honors and awards ==
Korach has been honored by the National Sportscasters and Sportswriters Association twice in his career. He was named the 2001 Nevada Sportscaster of the Year when he was based in Las Vegas for his work with the UNLV Runnin' Rebels basketball season. In 2013, he was named the California Sportscaster of the Year for his work with the Oakland Athletics radio network and 95.7 The Game, beating out John Ireland.

In 2003, Korach was elected by the Nevada Broadcasters Association to the Nevada Broadcasters Hall of Fame.

In 2017, Korach was inducted into the Jewish Sports Hall of Fame of Northern California, and in 2019 the iconic Bay Area voice was inducted into the Bay Area Radio Hall of Fame.

== Personal life ==
In March 2012, Korach underwent left knee replacement surgery. As a result, he missed several weeks on the broadcast. After the 2014 season, Korach suffered another injury to his left knee and had been rehabbing it, but was forced to miss the start of the 2015 Oakland Athletics season. He returned to the booth on May 23, 2015 after missing the first 46 games to the season.

Korach is married to Denise Korach (née Moran), and has a daughter, Emilee. He resides in Henderson, Nevada.
