= Tim Sinclair (announcer) =

American broadcaster and announcer

Tim J. Sinclair (born 1978) is an American television and radio broadcaster, and public address announcer. He has worked as the announcer for home games of the Chicago Bears in the National Football League (NFL) since 2020, for the Chicago Bulls in the National Basketball Association (NBA) since 2020–21, the Chicago Fire FC in Major League Soccer (MLS) since 2014, and the Illinois Fighting Illini men's basketball team in the National Collegiate Athletic Association (NCAA) since 2015–16.

== Career ==
Sinclair was born in 1978, in Detroit and his family in moved to Champaign, Illinois, in 2022. He attended the University of Illinois Urbana-Champaign but left before graduating to pursue a career in radio. In 2001, while he was working in local radio in Huntsville, Alabama, he was appointed as the public address announcer for the Huntsville Flight of the NBA Development League.

In 2011, Sinclair was one of four finalists out of 3,000 applicants to be the public address announcer for the Chicago Cubs. In 2012–13, he started working as the announcer for the Fighting Illini women's basketball team. He left after the 2021–22 season. In 2015, he began working for the men's team at the University of Illinois. In 2018, after a five-game summer stint with the Indiana Fever WNBA team, he was named as the announcer for the Indiana Pacers NBA franchise, whom he had watched as a child; his family were living in the area as well. He was there for two seasons from 2018–19 to 2019–20 before leaving to join the Bulls before the 2020–21 season, where he replaced long-serving announcer Tommy Edwards. He started with the Bears in 2020, taking over from 37-year veteran announcer Jim Riebandt.

Sinclair served as the public address announcer for the NBA All-Star Game in Chicago in 2020, in Cleveland for the league's 75th season in 2022, in Salt Lake City in 2023, and in Indianapolis in 2024. He was one of four public address announcers for the 2020 NBA Bubble at Walt Disney World near Orlando, Florida for five weeks, followed by four weeks in the Wubble at IMG Academy in Bradenton, Florida, and left to announce for the Chicago Bears at Soldier Field. Beginning in 2021, the video game NBA 2K22 included the real public address announcer for all 32 NBA teams for the first time; Sinclair is the in-game announcer for Bulls home games and has been featured in every edition since then. In 2024, he was featured in a commercial for State Farm alongside Benny the Bull.
