= David Diamante =

American ring announcer

David A. Diamante
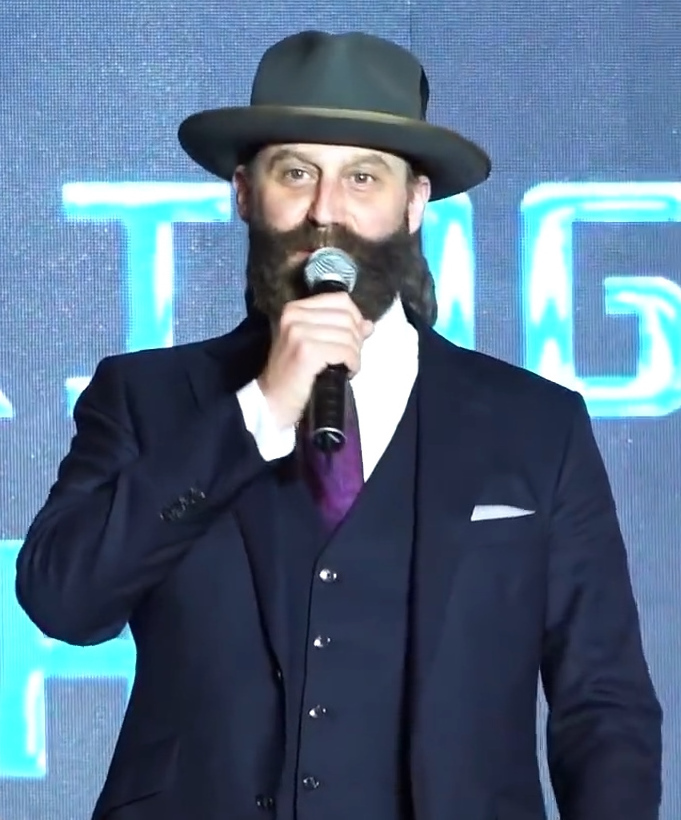
- Diamante in 2021
- Born: November 8, 1971 (age 55); Baltimore, Maryland, U.S.
- Occupation: Ring announcer
- Known for: The fight starts now!
- Website: www.daviddiamante.com

David Diamante (born November 8, 1971) is an American ring announcer. A popular ring announcer with DAZN, Diamante has been coined "The Voice of Boxing" by BBC Sport. He is widely known for his trademarked catchphrase "The fight starts now!", his long locks, and his distinctive announcing style in which he repeats each fighter's last name.

== Career ==
=== Boxing ===
Diamante began announcing boxing matches in New York City for USA Metro Boxing and the New York Golden Gloves. His first fight was in the basement of the Church Street Boxing Gym in Lower Manhattan.

Diamante volunteered for several years in the New York boxing community announcing fights for USA Boxing Metro and the New York Golden Gloves.

He has since gone on to announce a variety of events on HBO, Showtime, ESPN, DAZN, Fox Sports, NBC, CBS, and Sky Sports.

In 2018, Diamante signed an exclusive deal with Eddie Hearn's Matchroom Boxing with broadcasts appearing on DAZN and Sky Sports. In the summer of 2020 and in the midst of the COVID-19 pandemic, Diamante served as the official announcer for Matchroom's Fight Camp series, which took place in the back garden of Matchroom Boxing's UK headquarters and the childhood home of Eddie Hearn.

=== MMA ===
Diamante has announced various MMA and Muay Thai events, including the first legally sanctioned MMA show in New York City in May 2013.

=== Basketball ===
In 2012, Diamante was selected by Jay-Z and Nets management to become the official voice of the renamed NBA franchise, the Brooklyn Nets. He announced the final season for the Nets in New Jersey in 2011–2012 before following the team on their move to Brooklyn.

== Announcing style ==
Diamante has chosen to repeat the fighter's surnames in the tradition of former ring announcers such as Mark Beiro and Setrha Ejdaharian. The practice of repeating fighter surnames began before the advent of advanced sound systems and was done so that fans on different sides of the arena could hear the athletes names.

== Other activities ==
Diamante is also the owner of a cigar lounge in Brooklyn, New York.

== Honors ==
Diamante has been recognized as the 2015 Ring Announcer of the Year by Ring 8, The Veteran's Boxing Association of New York.

== Filmography and TV records ==
=== Films ===
Year	Title	Role
2005	Night of Henna	Bartender in Club
2007	The Irish Ropes	Himself
2014	Hardy	Himself
2015	Southpaw	Ring Announcer
2016	Back In The Day	Himself/Ring Announcer
2019	Ringside	Madison Square Garden Announcer (Voice)
2023	Creed III	Himself/Ring Announcer

=== Television ===
Year	Title	Role
2008-2013	ESPN Friday Night Fights	Himself/Ring Announcer
2011	HBO Boxing	Himself/Ring Announcer
2011-2012	HBO Boxing After Dark	Himself/Ring Announcer
2014	Park Bench with Steve Buscemi	Himself
2018	Gotti: Godfather and Son	Himself

=== Mini-series documentary ===
Year	Title
2018	The Voice
2018	Black Ink Crew
2018	The 'Lights
