= Alex Anthony =

American baseball PA announcer (born 1972)

Alex Anthony (born 1972) also known as Alex Anthony Sioukas, was best known as the Public Address announcer for Major League Baseball's New York Mets, a position he held from 2004 to 2017, first at Shea Stadium and then Citi Field since the Mets moved there in 2009. He is also the PA announcer for the New York Jets of the National Football League (NFL) and New York Islanders of the National Hockey League (NHL).

== Announcing career ==
Before becoming an announcer for the New York Mets, Anthony was the PA announcer for New York Islanders games at the Nassau Coliseum from 1995 to 1998. Anthony also announced New York Jets games at Giants Stadium and New Meadowlands Stadium from 2002 to 2008, while also announcing for the Mets. He later became the backup PA announcer for the New York Rangers from 2008 to 2012 while continuing to announce for the Mets. He returned to the Islanders since their move to the Barclays Center in 2015, when then-Islanders PA Announcer Roger Luce was unavailable. He went back to full-time work for the Islanders in 2019, as he called every game of the 2019–2020 season, and continued to do so for the Islanders final season at Nassau Coliseum.

Anthony is one of two game day PA announcers for the Jets along with Joe Nolan.

He was the announcer for the US Open Tennis Championship in 2002 and 2003.

Anthony also served as a PA voice during the 2006 National League Championship Series, the 2013 All-Star Game, and the 2015 World Series.

As of 2024, Anthony can be heard at every home game for the New York Islanders at UBS Arena and New York Jets at MetLife Stadium respectively.

== Childhood ==
Anthony grew up in Garden City, New York, a largely upper-middle class suburb on Long Island. He came from a Greek-American family, and his father was a furrier.

== Other announcing work ==
Apart from in-stadium sports announcing, he also does voice-over work on several radio stations and television stations along with most TV commercials, and video games, such as Grand Theft Auto.
