= Marysol Castro =

American journalist

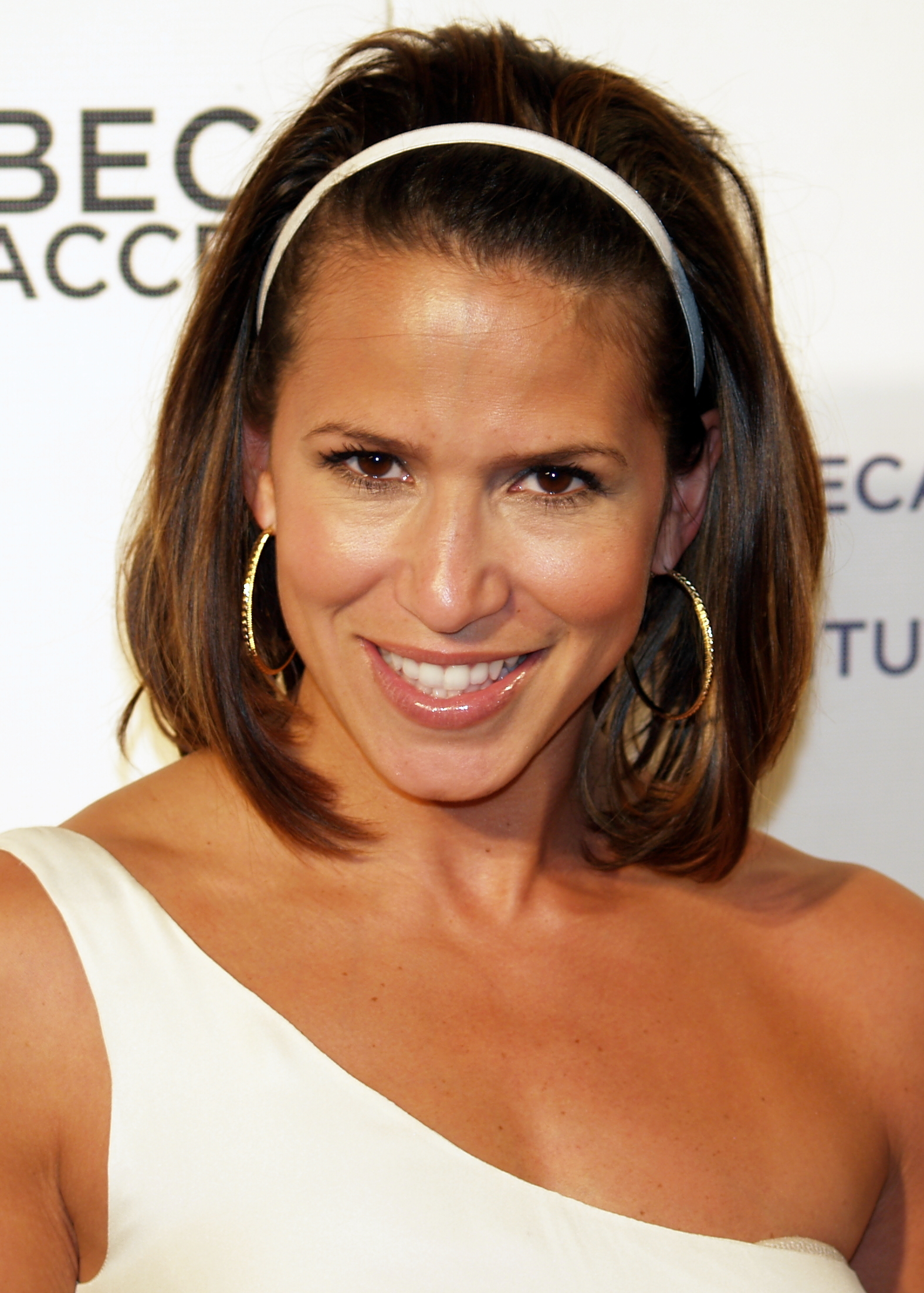
- Castro at the 2008 Tribeca Film Festival
- Born: Marysol Castro; July 8, 1974 (age 52); Bronx, New York, U.S.
- Education: Wesleyan University; Columbia University Graduate School of Journalism
- Occupations: Public Address announcer for the mets at Citi Field and morning news anchor for WPIX
- Years active: 2018–present

Marysol Castro is an American broadcast journalist and public address announcer. She is a public address announcer at Citi Field, the home stadium of the New York Mets, and a morning news anchor at WPIX in New York City. She previously worked as a features correspondent for the weekend edition of Good Morning America from 2004 to 2010 and as a weather forecaster for The Early Show in 2011.

== Early life and career ==
Born on July 8, 1974, to Puerto Rican parents in New York City, Castro was raised in the Bronx and attended Public School 83 and Intermediate School 181. She was later admitted to the Oliver Scholars Program, an independent school access program for high-achieving students of color, and attended Westtown School, a Quaker boarding school in Pennsylvania and graduated from Wesleyan University in Middletown, Connecticut, with a Bachelor of Arts degree in 1996. She later obtained a Master of Arts in journalism from the Columbia University Graduate School of Journalism.

Prior to her career with ABC News, Castro was a general assignment reporter for WPIX in New York. She worked as a reporter for News 12, a local cable news network in the Bronx. She taught briefly at Poly Prep Country Day School in Brooklyn as an English teacher. In September 2010, Castro left GMA Weekend. On January 3, 2011, as part of a complete show overhaul, Castro became the weekday weather forecaster for The Early Show on CBS replacing Dave Price. On September 2, 2011, it was announced that she would be leaving her post as weather anchor effective immediately.

In June 2015, Castro joined WTNH-TV ABC 8 in New Haven, Connecticut, to fill in as weekday morning traffic reporter and anchor. Castro was relieved of her fill-in duties in November 2015 and later left the station.

In July 2015, she joined ESPN as host of Premier Boxing Champions on ESPN.

Castro was named the new public address announcer at Citi Field for the New York Mets, on May 30, 2018, replacing Alex Anthony whom was fired the same year. She shares PA duties with weekday announcer Colin Cosell (grandson of Howard Cosell) working on weekends. Castro's first game was May 31, 2018, against the Chicago Cubs. Castro is the first female PA announcer in the Mets' history.

In 2023, she returned to WPIX as a weekday morning news anchor.
