= Paul Porter (announcer) =

American public address announcer

Paul Porter (born c. 1954) is an American public address announcer best known for his work for the Orlando Magic of the NBA, and the Tampa Bay Lightning of the National Hockey League.

Porter has served as the arena voice for the Magic from the team's inception in 1989 to 2025, and Lightning since their inception in 1992. In addition, Porter was the former public address announcer of the Cleveland Cavaliers from 1980 to 1984. He was also the arena voice of NBA All-Star games in 1981 in Cleveland and both 1992 and 2012 in Orlando. Paul left the Magic in 2025 after the team decided to move in another direction, replacing him with Jarryd Tribble.

Porter was the PA announcer of the Arena Football League's Tampa Bay Storm until the team ceased operations in December, 2017.

Porter is a native of Cleveland and currently resides in Tampa, Florida.

Preceded by n/a	Orlando Magic Public Address Announcer; 1989–2025	Succeeded by Jarryd Tribble

Preceded by Joe Tait	Cleveland Cavaliers Public Address Announcer; 1980–1984	Succeeded by Howie Chizek
