= Paul Friedman (announcer) =

American baseball announcer (born 1968)

Chicago Cubs
- public address announcer
- Born: January 1, 1968; Evanston, Illinois, U.S.

Teams
- As PA announcer: Chicago Cubs (1995-2010, 2021)

Paul Friedman (born 1968, Evanston, Illinois) is the public address announcer at Wrigley Field for the Chicago Cubs. Friedman returned as the public address announcer at Wrigley Field starting on opening day 2021. Previously Friedman served as the Cubs public address announcer from 1995-2010.
