= Gittleman =

Gittleman is a surname. Notable people with the surname include:

- Ann Louise Gittleman (born 1949), American author and proponent of alternative medicine, especially fad diets
- Joe Gittleman (born 1968), American musician

== See also ==
- Gettleman
