= David G. Dalin =

American rabbi and historian (born 1949)

David G. Dalin (born 28 June 1949) is an American rabbi and historian, and the author, co-author, or editor of twelve books on American Jewish history and politics and Jewish–Christian relations.

== Career ==
Dalin received a B.A. from the University of California at Berkeley, where he was elected to Phi Beta Kappa, an M.A. and Ph.D. from Brandeis University, and a second M.A. and rabbinic ordination from the Jewish Theological Seminary of America. In 2015, he was awarded an honorary Doctorate of Divinity from the Jewish Theological Seminary.

He is currently a senior research fellow at the Bernard G. and Rhoda G. Center at Brandeis University. He has taught Jewish Studies at several universities, has been a visiting professor at the Jewish Theological Seminary of America and George Washington University, and has been the Taube Research Fellow in American History at Stanford University. During the 2002–2003 academic year, Dalin was a visiting fellow at the James Madison Program in American Ideals and Institutions at Princeton University. Since 2006, he has been a member of Princeton University's James Madison Society.

Dalin's numerous articles and book reviews have appeared in American Jewish History, Commentary, First Things, The Weekly Standard, and the American Jewish Year Book. He has served as a member of the Editorial and advisory board of the journal First Things, of the editorial board of the journal Conservative Judaism and a member of the Academic Advisory Council of the American Jewish Historical Society.

Dalin's newest book, Jewish Justices of the Supreme Court, from Brandeis to Kagan: Their Lives and Legacies, published by Brandeis University Press in 2017, is the first history of the eight Jewish men and women who have served or who currently serve as justices of the Supreme Court. This book was selected as a finalist for the 2017 National Jewish Book Award.

== Published works ==
=== Books ===
- From Marxism to Judaism: Selected Essays of Will Herberg (1989) editor
- American Jews and the Separationist Faith: A New Debate on Religion in Public Life (1992) editor
- Making a Life, Building a Community: A History of the Jews of Hartford (1997)
- Religion and State in the American Jewish Experience (1997), with Jonathan D. Sarna
- Secularism, Spirituality, and the Future of American Jewry (1999) editor with Elliott Abrams
- The Presidents of the United States and the Jews (2000) with Alfred J. Kolatch
- The Pius War : Responses to the Critics of Pius XII (2004) with Joseph Bottum
- The Myth of Hitler's Pope: How Pope Pius XII Rescued Jews from the Nazis (2005)
- Icon of Evil: Hitler's Mufti and the Rise of Radical Islam (2008) with John Rothmann
- John Paul II and the Jewish People: A Jewish-Christian Dialogue (2008), editor with Matthew Levering.
- Harold E. Stassen: The Life and Perennial Candidacy of the Progressive Republican (2013)
- Jewish Justices of the Supreme Court: From Brandeis to Kagan (2017)
