= Jim Dunbar =

American radio director and anchor (1929–2019)

Jim Dunbar (October 9, 1929 – April 22, 2019) was an American radio program director, talk show host and news anchor. Dunbar was associated with KGO Radio in San Francisco for 37 years. According to radio historian Ben Fong-Torres, "He changed the Bay Area radio landscape by helping turn KGO from an also-ran into the greatest powerhouse on the dial, with a 30-year run at the top of the ratings."

== Career ==
Born in Dearborn, Michigan, Dunbar was a graduate of the Fordson High School class of 1947, and then attended Michigan State University, where he worked at the campus radio station as a play-by-play announcer for basketball games. He then served in the Army for two years, working at the radio station for Fort Riley, Kansas.

He later worked as a rock DJ at WXYZ in Detroit, WDSU in New Orleans (where he was also station manager), and WLS (AM) in Chicago before moving west to work for KGO in 1963. Dunbar worked at ABC-owned-and-operated KGO for the next 37 years, retiring in 2000. In addition to his radio work, he also hosted the popular AM San Francisco morning talk program on KGO-TV (Channel 7) for many years, beginning in 1965.

In 1969, a man called San Francisco police, identifying himself as the serial killer known as The Zodiac, and agreed to call Dunbar during AM San Francisco's live broadcast if either attorney Melvin Belli or attorney F. Lee Bailey were present on air. The police contacted Belli and Dunbar to arrange this in the hopes of capturing the individual. The suspect called as promised, spoke a few words, and then hung up, repeating this activity 54 times over the next two hours. The caller was later identified as a mental patient named Eric Weill, who called from Napa State Hospital. Police quickly ruled Weill out as the Zodiac. However, Belli received a letter from the actual Zodiac later that same year.

In 1973, a gunman entered the KGO studio and fired at Dunbar while he was on the air; bulletproof glass stopped the bullet, but the gunman subsequently killed a station employee and then himself.

== Honors ==
He was elected to the National Radio Hall of Fame in 1999, and to the Bay Area Radio Hall of Fame (Class 2006) in 2006 as a member of the first class to be inducted.

== Personal life and death ==
Dunbar was married to Beth Monroe, whom he met in New Orleans; they had a son and a daughter.

On April 22, 2019, Dunbar died peacefully due to old age, according to his daughter.

== Portrayals ==
Dunbar is portrayed by actor Tom Verica in the 2007 film Zodiac, in a scene recreating the call to AM San Francisco by the person claiming to be the Zodiac Killer.
