= Len Tillem =

American attorney and radio broadcaster (1944–2022)

- Born: June 9, 1944; The Bronx, New York City
- Died: January 13, 2022 (aged 77); Sonoma, California
- Relatives: Jon Favreau (nephew-in-law)

Leonard M. Tillem (June 9, 1944 – January 13, 2022) was an American attorney and radio broadcaster. He hosted "The Len Tillem Show," which is considered to be one of the first legal affairs radio show in the U.S.

== Early life ==
Tillem was born on June 9, 1944, in The Bronx in New York City, New York, to Jewish immigrants from Poland who spoke Yiddish. He grew up in Belle Harbor, Queens. He attended Far Rockaway High School, graduating in 1962. He earned his Juris Doctor (J.D.) from the New York University School of Law and was admitted to the State Bar of California on January 18, 1972.

== Career ==
Tillem got his start in radio in 1990 on Napa Valley's KVON. He moved onto KSRO in Santa Rosa before San Francisco mega-station KGO gave him a Sunday afternoon show in 2000. His show would eventually move to the noon weekday timeslot, where it was the highest ranked program.

On December 1, 2011, KGO changed to an all-news format and terminated the employment of all of its weekday radio program hosts except for Ronn Owens. Tillem resumed his radio program on the Bay Area radio station KKSF NewsTalk 910 AM San Francisco on January 3, 2012.

Tillem ceased broadcasting on NewsTalk 910 on March 29, 2013. From then until July 23, 2013, he continued his radio program exclusively on the web via podcasts.

== Personal life and death ==
Tillem's niece, Joya Tillem, is a physician and is married to filmmaker Jon Favreau since 2000.

He died on January 13, 2022, at the age of 77 at his home in Sonoma, California.
