= Brian Copeland =

American actor, author, broadcaster and comedian (born 1964)

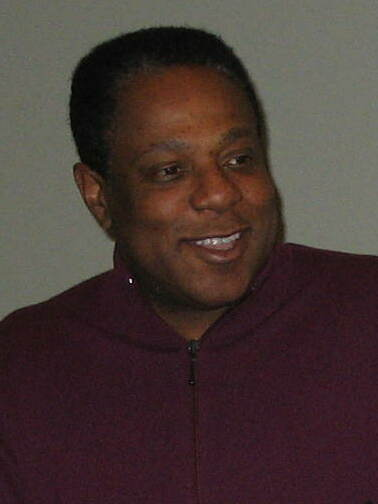
Brian Copeland in 2009

Brian Copeland (born 1964) is an American actor, comedian, radio talk show host, playwright and author based in the San Francisco Bay Area.

Copeland has been the opening act for artists such as Ray Charles, Natalie Cole, Aretha Franklin and Ringo Starr. For more than 27 years, he hosted a radio program for San Francisco radio station KGO. His program formerly aired weekdays from 2pm–4pm. On September 13, 2010, he became the host of "7 Live," a new hour-long, weekday program on KGO-TV in San Francisco.

In 2015, Copeland was officially recognized as a Legend of San Francisco Comedy by Comedy Celebration Day. In 2025, he was inducted into the Bay Area Radio Hall of Fame.

== Early life ==
Copeland was born in Akron, Ohio and grew up in Hayward, California and San Leandro, California.

He attended Moreau Catholic High School, located in Hayward, California. He studied political science at Holy Names University.

== Plays ==
In 2004, Copeland premiered his first one-man show, Not a Genuine Black Man, at The Marsh. The show is an account of his experiences growing up in the East Bay suburb of San Leandro, California in the 1970s, when it was considered a racist enclave due to its 99.99% white population and the coordinated policies of housing discrimination and segregation which were in place until the 1960s. The play, originally scheduled for a six-week run, went on to run 7 years, becoming the longest-running one-man show in San Francisco history.

Further solo shows followed in 2012, The Waiting Period; 2013, The Jewelry Box; and 2014, The Scion2016 and Grandma & Me 2022, which won the regional Broadway World award for Outstanding Performance in a Solo show.

== Books ==
In 2006, the publishing house Hyperion released a memoir by Copeland based upon his play. In 2009, the book was selected by Silicon Valley Reads to read and discuss as a community. This organization represents this Northern Californian region's libraries, bookstores, and schools, along with some civic leaders.

Copeland has written two crime fiction novels in the Topher Davis series, Outraged (2024), which was a 2025 nominee for the McCavity award for Best First Mystery and Shadows of Justice (2025).

== Film career ==
In 2006, Copeland was cast as the son of Morgan Freeman's character in the Rob Reiner film The Bucket List, also starring Jack Nicholson. In 2020 he played a television news reporter in the blockbuster Venom 2: Let There Be Carnage which starred Tom Hardy and Woody Harrelson.
