= KSFO =

Conservative talk radio station in San Francisco

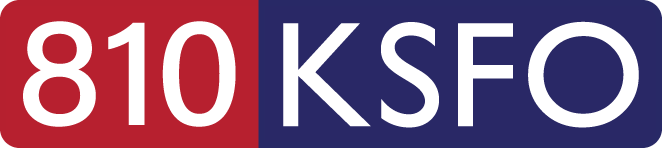
- San Francisco, California; United States
- Broadcast area: San Francisco Bay Area
- Frequency: 810 kHz
- Branding: 810 KSFO

Programming
- Format: Conservative talk
- Affiliations: Fox News Radio; Compass Media Networks; Premiere Networks; Westwood One

Ownership
- Owner: Cumulus Media; (Radio License Holdings LLC)
- Sister stations: KNBR; KNBR-FM; KSAN; KTCT

History
- First air date: January 8, 1924
- Former call signs: KGO (1924–2024)
- Call sign meaning: San Francisco (also the ICAO airport code for San Francisco International Airport)

Technical information
- Licensing authority: FCC
- Facility ID: 34471
- Class: A
- Power: 50,000 watts (unlimited)
- Transmitter coordinates: 37°31′34.8″N 122°6′5.9″W

Links
- Public license information: Public file; LMS
- Webcast: Listen live
- Website: www.ksfo.com

KSFO (810 AM) is a commercial radio station licensed to San Francisco, California, featuring a conservative talk radio format. Owned by Cumulus Media, KSFO's studios are on Battery Street in San Francisco's Financial District. KSFO used the call sign KGO from 1924 to 2024.

KSFO's transmitter site is in Fremont, near the Dumbarton Bridge, where its prominent towers are used by pilots as a landmark when navigating. KSFO broadcasts with 50,000 watts, the highest power permitted for AM stations by the Federal Communications Commission (FCC). It uses a directional antenna with a three-tower array. Most of its signal is sent north and south to avoid interfering with the other Class A station on 810 AM, WGY in Schenectady. Most nights, using a good radio, KSFO can be heard throughout the Western United States and Western Canada. Due to its extensive groundwave signal, its daytime coverage extends into many areas of Northern California.

== History ==
=== 1920s and 1930s ===
After several late-night test broadcasts, using the experimental call sign 6XG, the station signed on, as KGO, on January 8, 1924. It broadcast from General Electric's (GE) Oakland transformer manufacturing plant. (The original two-story brick building, constructed specifically for the station on East 14th Street, was demolished sometime in the 1980s.) The station was authorized for a then-impressive transmitting power of 1,000 watts. KGO was part of GE's three-station holdings, in addition to WGY in Schenectady, New York, and KOA in Denver, Colorado. At its debut it was known as the "Sunset Station", because it was GE's West Coast outlet.

As was the custom with early radio stations, the programming consisted of performances by local talent, including the KGO Orchestra. which provided some of the music, and a dramatic group known as the KGO Players, which performed weekly plays and short skits, often under the direction of Bay Area drama instructor Wilda Wilson Church. The station's music, which was also performed by other local orchestras and vocalists, included classical selections as well as popular dance music the next night. Due to GE's association with the Radio Corporation of America (RCA), and RCA's 1927 launch of the NBC Red Network, KGO was soon operated by NBC management out of studio facilities in San Francisco.

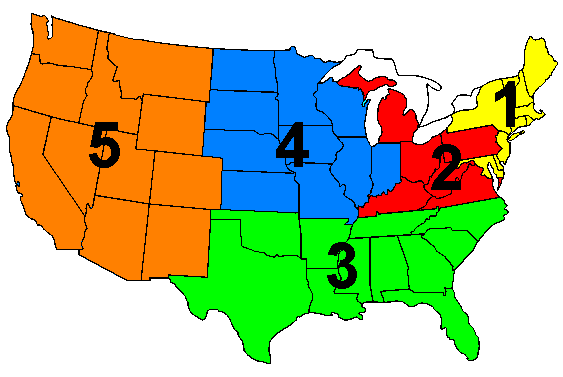
Regional districts used for the November 11, 1928, implementation of the Federal Radio Commission's General Order 40. KGO was in Region 5, and WGY was in Region 1

The March 28, 1928, reauthorization of the Radio Act of 1927 included a provision, known as the Davis Amendment, which mandated an "equality of radio broadcasting service" within the United States. This specified an "equitable allocation" among five regional zones. On November 11, 1928, the Federal Radio Commission (FRC) implemented a major broadcasting station reallocation, based on its General Order 40. Included in this band plan was the designation of what became known as "clear channel" stations, which were high powered stations with extensive nighttime coverage. This plan designated 40 U.S. clear channels, divided eight to each region, with KGO, on 790 kHz, included as one of the Region 5 assignments. The only other station assigned to 790 kHz was WGY. KGO and WGY were both owned by GE, with WGY considered the company's showcase station. GE was able to effectively transfer KGO's clear channel assignment from Region 5 to WGY's Region 1, by increasing the power of WGY to 50,000 watts, while limiting KGO to 7,500 watts. (Directional antennas were not developed until the early 1930s, so both stations operated with non-directional antennas.) Any question about the propriety of this action became moot after the Davis Amendment was repealed on June 5, 1936.

=== 1940s and 1950s ===
In 1941, stations on 790, including WGY and KGO, were moved to 810 as part of the implementation of the North American Regional Broadcasting Agreement (NARBA).

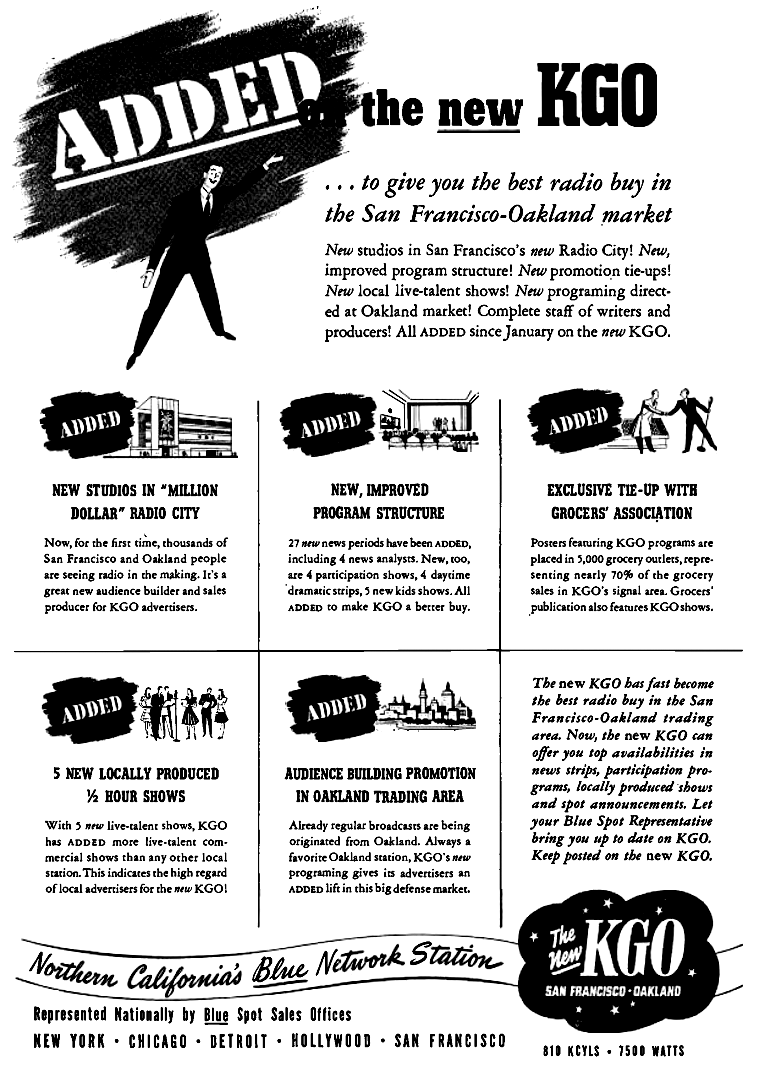
In 1942, KGO became the key western affiliate for the newly divested Blue (later American Broadcasting Company) radio network.

When the Federal Communications Commission (FCC) required NBC to sell one of its two networks (and that network's owned-and-operated stations), KGO's license switched from Radio Corporation of America to the Blue Network, Inc., effective January 23, 1942. The NBC Blue Network initially simply dropped "NBC" from its name to become the "Blue Network", then in June 1945 became the American Broadcasting Company. KGO became one of the founding stations of the ABC Radio Network as a result.

In the post World War 2 period, KGO produced many live music programs, including that of Western Swing bandleader Bob Wills, whose music was a staple of the time. KGO was instrumental in bringing the first exercise show to broadcasting, hosted by Jack LaLanne, a fitness instructor and gym operator in nearby Oakland. LaLanne conducted his radio fitness show for many years on KGO, moving in the late 1950s to KGO-TV and a successful TV syndication career.

On December 1, 1947, KGO's power was increased to 50,000 watts, as it switched to a directional antenna that limited its signal toward WGY in the west, while WGY continued to operate with a non-directional antenna. It was reported at the time that KGO's upgrade "retired the nation's oldest regularly operating transmitter-a 7,500-watter... in use since Jan. 8, 1924".

By the late 1950s, KGO suffered from poor ratings. In 1962, ABC installed new management, including program director Jim Dunbar from Chicago sister station WLS. Dunbar revamped the station into one of the country's first news/talk stations. While the new format was initially unsuccessful, Dunbar stressed the "live and local" aspect of the programming by running the talk shows every day from locations such as Johnny Kan's Chinese restaurant, Señor Pico's Restaurant, and the hungry i nightclub. This higher profile caused KGO's ratings to begin a steady climb. Among KGO's personalities during this period was future Radio Hall of Fame member J.P. McCarthy, the station's morning host in the early 1960s.

=== 1960s–1980s ===
After trying various formats, KGO eventually shifted to news and talk programming, relying heavily on the ABC radio network for its news programs. KGO started carrying Paul Harvey's twice-daily programs but also began to develop a strong local news staff that produced extended morning and afternoon newscasts. The local talk show hosts included Les Crane, Owen Spann and Jim Eason, who often interviewed visiting celebrities in the KGO studios. Owen Spann also originated special broadcasts from Europe and Africa, interviewing government officials from those countries. Local director-actor Jack Brooks hosted a Saturday-morning entertainment program until his sudden death in June 1984, after directing a production of Kismet for the Capuchino Community Theatre that featured Jim Eason as the poet Omar Khayyám. Dr. Dean Edell began his regular medical programs at KGO, leading to nationally syndicated broadcasts

Two of KGO's three towers partially collapsed during the Loma Prieta earthquake on October 17, 1989. All three were replaced.

=== 1990s–2010s ===
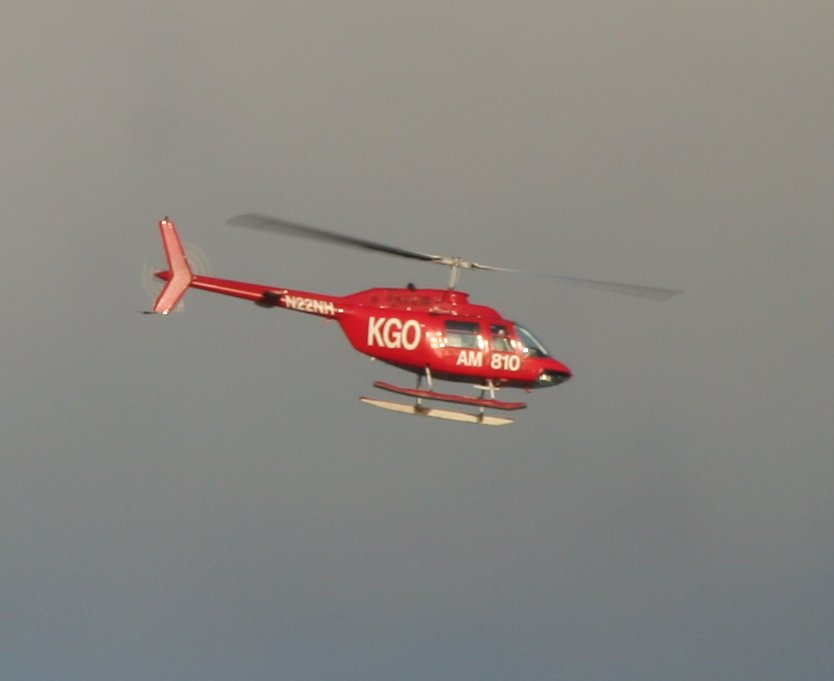
KGO helicopter (2006)

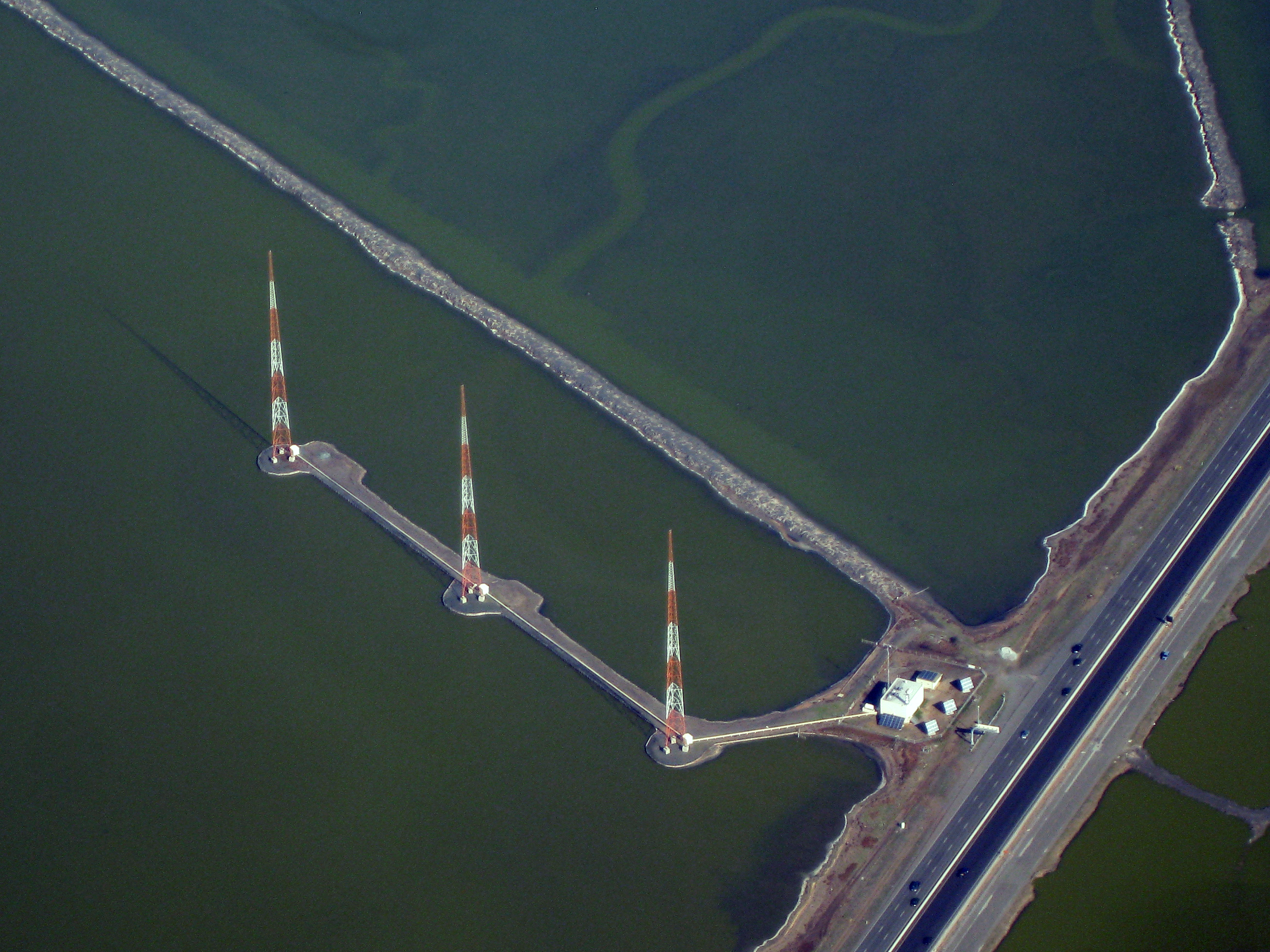
KGO transmission towers in San Francisco Bay, 2008

In March 2008, solar panels were installed at KGO's transmitter site in Fremont, California, to offset some of its power consumption during daytime hours. The installation was a test bed for Pacific Gas and Electric Company and is located near the Dumbarton Bridge. The solar system uses both CPV (SolFocus) and PV (Premier Power) arrays and provides about 17 kilowatts, or 33% (one third), of the radio frequency (RF) power output from the 50 kW transmitter (or about one-tenth of the total power consumption of their transmitter site over a 24-hour period). United States Speaker of the House Rep. Nancy Pelosi turned the system on during an on-air ceremony.

For over 30 years, from July 1978 to January 2009, KGO was the number-one station in the San Francisco Bay Area in the Arbitron ratings, a feat unmatched by any other station in the United States. According to the 2010 Arbitron ratings, however, KGO had lost its lead to KCBS, with KOIT-FM as a close second, and KGO listing at third. When KGO switched to all-news in December 2011, it fell further behind in the local ratings. As of Spring 2013, KGO placed 16th in the market, with approximately half of their listenership when they were number one.

Until December 5, 2011, KGO created nearly all of its own local programming, with very limited syndicated content. The majority of its programs were hosted by San Francisco Bay Area broadcasters. The daily schedule included many issues-oriented talk shows, with weekday hosts that included Gene Burns, Gil Gross, Ronn Owens, John Rothmann and lawyer Len Tillem. The station also carried a variety of specialty programs, particularly on weekends, with John Hamilton discussing travel and leisure, Gene Burns covering fine food and dining (on a show separate from his weekday program), Joanie Greggains hosting a health-and-fitness program, and Brent Walters, who teaches "Comparative Religions" at San Jose State University, hosting the early Sunday morning show, God Talk. In 2014, KGO brought in John Batchelor at midnight. News/talk weekend hosts now include Brian Copeland, "Karel" Charles Karel Bouley, and Pat Thurston.

Up to 2011, the weekday morning news (from 5 a.m. to 9 a.m.) was co-anchored by Jon Bristow and Jennifer Jones-Lee. The afternoon news (from 2 p.m. to 7 p.m.) featured veteran reporter Chris Brecher and award-winning reporter/anchor Bret Burkhart.

Until the format change in December 2011, KGO hosted an annual fundraiser called the "KGO Cure-a-Thon" to help raise money for The Leukemia & Lymphoma Society with all of the station's regular programming pre-empted for an entire day during the event. Listeners were encouraged to call in and donate money to help in the fight against these kinds of cancer. An auction was also held to help raise money. Notable items up for auction have included a trip with Gene Burns on a private jet to various destinations, such as Las Vegas and Italy, for a gourmet dinner. Cumulus Media has announced that it will not be continuing the KGO Cure-a-Thon charity event despite the fact it has raised millions of dollars for charity in the past.

On December 2, 2011, new owner Cumulus Media announced that KGO was rebranding itself as "news and information", moving to an all-news format from 2 p.m. to 7 p.m. (in addition to the existing morning-drive, noon-hour and afternoon-drive news blocks). The change was scheduled for December 5. This had resulted in the abrupt termination, on December 1, of most of the talk hosts (including Gene Burns, Gil Gross, John Rothmann, Ray Taliaferro, Len Tillem, and Dr. Bill Wattenburg). Ronn Owens's morning show, as well as weekend talk programming remained, although some of the weekend hosts (including Joanie Greggains, and Len Tillem) were also terminated on December 1, 2011. Bob Brinker's syndicated "Moneytalk" was moved to KSFO (560 AM), a politically conservative talk radio sister station which arguably better reflected Brinker's conservative politico-economic views. KGO also dropped Leo Laporte's weekend syndicated tech talk program in the format change. Gil Gross, Len Tillem and Leo Laporte would all move to competitor KKSF.

The format change and termination of many popular talk show hosts sparked outrage among long-time listeners, many of whom called for sponsors to drop their advertising on the station. Ratings declined substantially following the change, with competitors KCBS and KQED-FM continuing to lead the market, and in December 2014, KGO reintroduced talk programming on weekdays. In December 2014, KGO added Chip Franklin to the noon to 3 pm lineup. In January 2015, KGO announced they had hired Chicago/San Antonio radio personality Kevin "DreX" Buchar, best known for his successful morning show on Chicago's WKSC-FM, which ran for more than a decade, from 7PM to 10PM. John Batchelor's syndicated show aired overnights, returning KGO to the same level of news programming as before 2011.

Both KGO and Dallas-based sister station KLIF shared similar visual "News/Information" identities after KLIF's parent Cumulus acquired Citadel, until 2014, when talk programming was reintroduced.

At noon on March 31, 2016, KGO dropped its previous programming and began stunting with recordings of speeches from influential figures and people talking about San Francisco, as well as songs about the city, while promoting "The Next Generation of KGO" to launch on April 5 (though with a break during the weekend for paid programming). At least 20 people, including the entire news staff, as well as some staffers from sister station KFOG, were laid off with the change. Originally, long-time KGO host Ronn Owens announced that he would be moving to sister station KSFO in the afternoon slot beginning April 4. However, due to what was advertised as a "listener reaction" against the move (in reality, Owens contested the move of his show off KGO as against the terms of his contract), Owens stayed with KGO. KGO kept its news/talk format, but relaunched it with a new live and local lineup, which included Owens and Armstrong & Getty in mornings; Armstrong & Getty, a regionally syndicated program based at KSTE in Sacramento, had previously aired in the Bay Area on KKSF. Owens left the station in 2018, and Armstrong & Getty moved to KSFO in 2020 to be replaced by Nikki Medoro, previously an afternoon news anchor.

=== 2022–2024: Sports betting as "The Spread" ===
On October 6, 2022, at approximately 10:16 a.m., KGO abruptly ended the news/talk format in the middle of midday host Mark Thompson's show. Thompson later said he had been informed just before going on-air that a format change would be implemented shortly, but was asked not to use the opportunity to say goodbye to listeners. Instead, mid-show, Thompson was signaled to give a final station identification.

The station then began a stunt loop featuring songs and promotional announcements referring to betting, money, and winning. The promotions stated that a new format, billed as "the most unique radio station in the Bay Area", would launch on October 10, assuring listeners that they "can bet on it". On that day, KGO launched a sports talk format emphasizing sports betting, branded as "810 The Spread". The new format had no local programming, and the station's schedule was primarily sourced from the BetQL and CBS Sports Radio networks, serving as a complement to sister sports stations KNBR-FM and KTCT. Some hours on weekends were money-related paid brokered programming.

=== 2024–2026: Move of KSFO to 810 kHz ===
On November 15, 2024, Cumulus announced that the intellectual property of KSFO (560 AM) (call letters, conservative talk format, and talent) would move to the stronger 810 kHz on November 18. Most KSFO programming was simulcast on both 810 AM and 560 AM beginning that date under the "810 KSFO" brand, except for Golden Bears sports events airing only on 810.

The KGO call sign was retired on January 1, 2025, in favor of KSFO; on the same day, 560 AM, formerly KSFO, became KZAC, but retained the simulcast with the new KSFO. On March 3, 2025, KZAC went off the air. In August 2026, Cumulus surrendered KZAC's license for 560 AM to the Federal Communications Commission, permanently ending operation of the former KSFO facility. Cumulus had previously told the FCC that it was considering selling the station, but no sale was completed.

== Programming ==
Most of KSFO's schedule is nationally syndicated conservative talk shows. Weekdays begin with Armstrong & Getty. They are followed by The Vince Show with Vince Coglianese, The Sean Hannity Show, The Mark Levin Show, The Ramsey Show with Dave Ramsey, Fix California with John Phillips, Red Eye Radio and This Morning, America's First News with Gordon Deal. Since April 1, 2025, John Phillips joins the weekday afternoon program. Some hours begin with an update from Fox News Radio.

KSFO is one of three AM stations owned by Cumulus Media in the San Francisco Bay Area, along with KNBR and KTCT. From 1962 until 2022, KGO carried news and talk programming. In October 2022, the station switched to a sports talk format, with an emphasis on sports betting. It carried the BetQL Network most of the day, with some shows from the Infinity Sports Network at night.

KGO was the radio home for the San Francisco 49ers football team from 1987 to 2005. It has been broadcasting California Golden Bears football games since 1974. Since 2013, it also broadcasts select California Golden Bears men's basketball games. The station began to air San Jose Earthquakes soccer games in 2023.

== Former staff ==
- James Abbe
- Robert J. Ackerly
- Ken Bastida
- Barbara Boxer
- Ira Blue
- Jon Bristow
- Gene Burns
- Brian Copeland
- Christine Craft
- Les Crane
- Mark Curtis
- Jim Dunbar
- Jim Eason
- Dean Edell
- Art Finley
- Michael Finney
- Chip Franklin
- James Gabbert
- Duane Garrett
- Joanie Greggains
- Gil Gross
- Orral Humphrey
- Greg Jarrett
- Michael Krasny
- Leo Laporte
- David Lazarus
- Dick Leonard
- Dude Martin
- J. P. McCarthy
- Larry Mendte
- Melanie Morgan
- Ronn Owens
- Kevin Radich
- John Rothmann
- Michael Savage
- Lon Simmons
- Barbara Simpson
- Joe Starkey
- Monty Stickles
- Ray Taliaferro
- Robert Trebor
- Mark Thompson
- Len Tillem
- Wayne Walker
- Bernie Ward
- Bill Wattenburg
- Jack Webb
- Jim Wieder
- Dennis Willis
- Pete Wilson
- Lloyd Lindsay Young

== Former logos ==
KGO logo during the 1990s

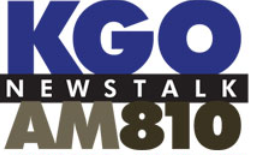
KGO logo from 2000 to 2011

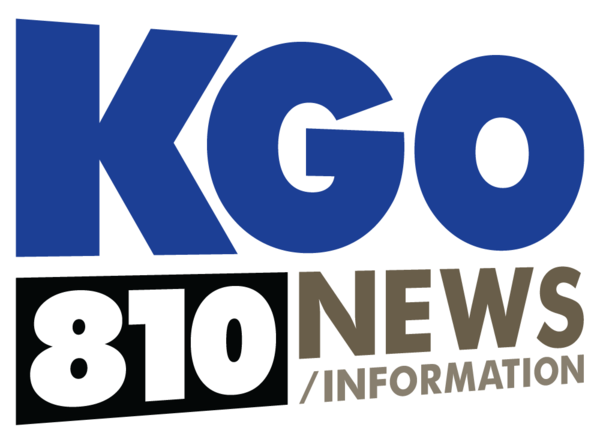
KGO's logo under an all-news format, 2011–2016

KGO's final logo as a news/talk station, 2016–2022

== See also ==
- KGO-TV
- KKSF
