= Jim Eason =

Conservative talk radio personality (1935–2025)

Jim Eason (1935-2025) was a conservative talk radio personality who hosted broadcasts from 1966 to 2000 in the San Francisco Bay Area. He always ended his talk shows with the catchphrase "Do what you can, but behave yourself". His early 1970s theme was "Hold On, I'm Coming" by Sam & Dave. He later changed his opening theme to the Dave Brubeck/Paul Desmond jazz classic "Take Five".

== Early life and education ==
James H. Eason, Jr., was born December 26, 1935, in Burlington, North Carolina, and attended schools in Graham, and Glade Valley, and a year at Edwards Military Academy. He studied at Piedmont Bible College in Winston-Salem for a year before joining the United States Air Force in 1954.

== Career in the USAF ==
In the USAF weather service, Eason was stationed in Illinois, then at Sidi Slimane and Nouasseur Air Base from 1955 to 1956. Following Morocco, he was based in San Antonio, Texas, then Sondrestrom Fjord Greenland 1960-1961 and Merced, California, from 1961 to 1963. After an honorable discharge from the USAF, Eason enrolled in the Radio TV Broadcast Department at San Francisco State University from 1962 to 1964.

== Radio career ==
During his USAF assignment in Morocco, Eason broadcast a music call-in show over Armed Forces Radio in addition to his weather tower duties. In 1964 he had his first Bay Area broadcast guest-hosting "Records at Random" on KSFO, opening his show with Ray Charles's "What’d I Say". Between 1966 and 1967, Eason both created and hosted "Testing 1-2-3", a call-in game show on KCBS. In 1969, he joined KGO as a weekend talk show host after KCBS went to an all-news format. In 1970, Eason became a KGO weeknight talk show host. He moved to weekday afternoons in 1973, frequently interviewing visiting entertainers, authors, and public figures.

A longtime resident of the San Francisco area, Eason moved to Asheville, North Carolina, in 1993, where he broadcast his KGO talk show via high-speed connection from his home studio. He was one of the first to do this type of remote broadcast on a regular basis. In 1996, while continuing to broadcast from his home studio in Asheville, Eason's show was moved from KGO to ABC's then newly-acquired and more conservative sister station KSFO.

Eason quit KSFO radio due to a "philosophical" conflict with management in 2000, which marked his official retirement from broadcasting.

Eason returned to Northern California in 2003. He was inducted into the Bay Area Radio Hall of Fame in 2007.

== Personal life ==
Eason was married twice. He and his first wife Gay Sibley had one son. The marriage ended in 1963. In 1964 he married Barbara Thrall; they had two children. Jim died peacefully on February 8, 2025, after a long illness.
