= Greg Jarrett =

Greg Jarrett may refer to:

- Greg Jarrett (radio personality) (born 1952), San Francisco news reporter and Chicago morning radio host
- Gregg Jarrett (born 1955), news personality on Fox News Channel
