= Gene Burns =

American talk radio host (1940–2013)

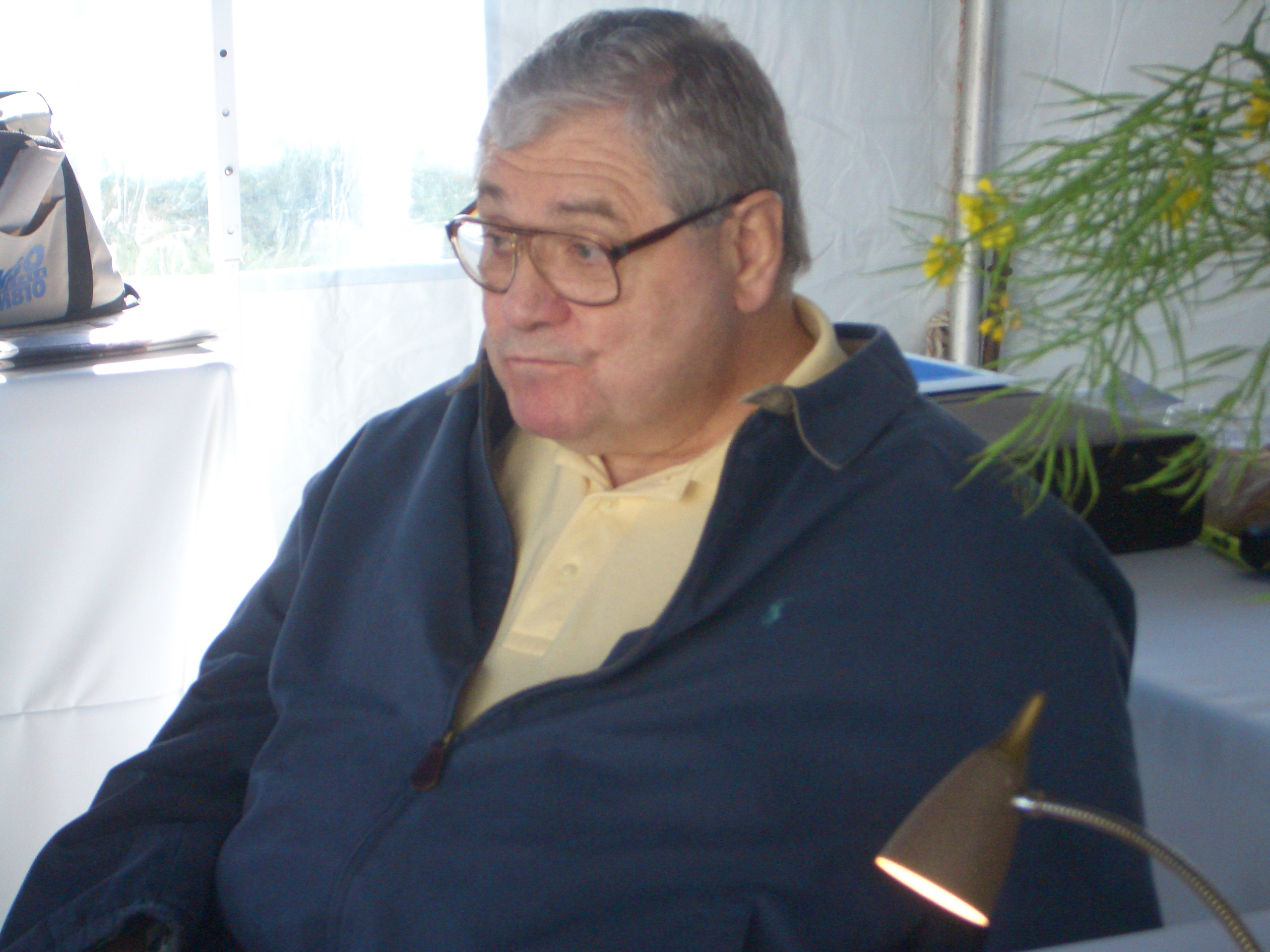
- Radio talkshow host Gene Burns doing a remote from Napa California for Dining Around with Gene Burns in March 2006.
- Born: December 3, 1940; Hornell, New York, U.S.
- Died: May 25, 2013 (aged 72); San Francisco, California, U.S.
- Occupation: Radio host
- Known for: Political and social commentary; Food and wine expert

Gene Burns (December 3, 1940 – May 25, 2013) was an American talk radio host. He hosted Dining Around with Gene Burns, a food wine and travel program, which aired Saturdays on NewsTalk 810 AM in San Francisco. He also hosted The Gene Burns Program, a political and social commentary show, that aired on NewsTalk 810.

He had previously broadcast both shows on KGO in San Francisco. On December 1, 2011, it was announced he was among the hosts cut by KGO as it shifted to more of a news format. Burns was scheduled to continue his shows on the radio station KKSF 910 AM on January 3, 2012. Instead, fill-in hosts took his place as he recovered from an unknown illness. On April 3, 2012, Burns disclosed on his KKSF blog that he was recovering from a stroke that had resulted in aphasia.

Burns worked in several different major markets throughout his broadcasting career. In addition to San Francisco, he also hosted radio programs in Baltimore, Boston, New York City, Orlando and Philadelphia.

== Early life ==
Burns was born and raised in Hornell, New York. Following high school graduation, he attended Rutgers University before becoming involved in the local politics of Hornell, serving as chairman of a young citizens' committee.

== Radio career ==
In his early twenties, Burns was hired as news director for radio station WWHG in his hometown of Hornell, New York, before moving on to WSBA in York, Pennsylvania. He began his career as talk radio host at WCBM in Baltimore in the mid-1960s. While at WCBM, Burns did two major international assignments, going to Vietnam in 1968 and the Middle East in 1969.

Following a brief stint with WEEI in Boston, Burns served as a talk show host as well as program director at WKIS in Orlando, Florida, beginning in 1971. He would remain there until 1981, when he departed for WCAU in Philadelphia in 1981. He then returned to Orlando and WKIS in the early 1980s and was named the station's operations manager in 1984. In 1985, Burns returned to Boston, hosting a talk show on WRKO for eight years.

In 1993, Burns moved to New York City and began hosting a nationally syndicated talk program from the studios of WOR.

In 1995, he resumed his broadcasting career at KGO in San Francisco. He hosted a talk show of political and social commentary called The Gene Burns Program on weeknights, as well as a program that focused on wine and fine dining in the San Francisco Bay Area called Dining Around with Gene Burns which was broadcast weekly on Saturdays.

Talkers magazine ranked Burns #24 on its list of The 25 Greatest Radio and Television Talk Show Hosts of All Time, in 2002.

== Politics ==
As a political commentator, Burns was known for his libertarian views. He ran for the presidential nomination of the Libertarian Party in 1984, but withdrew his candidacy prior to the party's nominating convention citing a lack of financial support. In 2008, Burns announced that he had re-registered as a member of the Democratic Party, which he had left in the late 1960s after having been a member for several years.

== Death ==
Burns died May 25, 2013, in San Francisco. He had suffered two strokes and had other health problems. He was 72.
