= Icon of Evil =

2008 book by David G. Dalin

Icon of Evil: Hitler's Mufti and the Rise of Radical Islam
- Book cover
- Author: David G. Dalin, John F. Rothmann; Alan Dershowitz
- Language: English
- Genre: History
- Publisher: Random House (2008); Transaction Publishers (2009)
- Publication date: June 24, 2008
- Publication place: United States
- Media type: Print (Hardcover)
- Pages: 240
- ISBN: 1-4000-6653-0 (2008); 1412810779 (2009)
- OCLC: 180205003

Icon of Evil: Hitler's Mufti and the Rise of Radical Islam is a 2008 book by David G. Dalin and John F. Rothmann initially published by Random House; the 2009 version of the book by Transaction Publishers has an introduction by Alan Dershowitz. It is a biography of Haj Amin al-Husseini (1895–1974), who was the Grand Mufti of Jerusalem during the British Mandate period. Some reviewers were critical of its "overtly propagandistic" style, citing numerous factual errors and criticizing its thesis that a direct line can be drawn from the Mufti to modern-day Islamic leaders as unconvincing and lacking evidence. Other reviewers praised the book, one describing it as "the first serious biography of the mufti to appear in 14 years".

== Summary ==
The book portrays Husseini, a member of an important Jerusalem Arab family, as an antisemite and a key figure in infusing the modern Arab world with antisemitic attitudes. It asserts that Husseini's views were the casus belli for virtually all modern Middle Eastern terrorism – "an unbroken chain of terror from Adolf Hitler, Haj Amin al-Husseini, Sayyid Qutb, and Yasser Arafat to Hamas' founder and spiritual leader, Sheikh Ahmad Yassin, Sheikh Omar Abd al-Rahman, and Ramzi Yousef, who planned the World Trade Center bombings of 1993, to Osama bin Laden and Mohamed Atta, to Ahmed Omar Saeed Sheikh, the Pakistani Muslim terrorist who planned the kidnapping and murder of U.S. journalist Daniel Pearl, and to Iranian president Mahmoud Ahmadinejad."

== Reviews ==
Icon of Evil received a strongly critical response from some reviewers. Simon Maxwell Apter, writing in the San Francisco Chronicle, describes the book as "cursory and apparently hastily written" and "bereft of any nuance or counterargument" for its insistence on blaming the mufti for "anything and everything Islamist". Acknowledging that Husseini had indeed played an important role in inciting anti-Jewish violence, Apter concludes that Icon of Evil presents a distorted simplification of history: "To claim that Icon of Evil paints a black-and-white view of history does the book too much justice; it's an entirely black—or entirely white—story told here."

The Israeli historian Tom Segev, writing in the New York Times, criticized the book as "of little scholarly value, and [it] may be potentially harmful to Middle East peace prospects." Segev highlights the authors' consistent failure to provide solid evidence, for instance asserting on the basis of rumors that Husseini owed his position to a "passionate homosexual relationship" with a senior British official, and the degree to which the authors "blur the terms radical Islam, anti-Semitism and Nazism" and group together numerous Arabs and Muslims as "disciples of the mufti." He concludes: "[T]he book is worth noticing, as it belongs to a genre of popular Arab-bashing that is often believed to be 'good for Israel.' It is not. The suggestion that Israel's enemies are Nazis, or the Nazis' heirs, is apt to discourage any fair compromise with the Palestinians, and that is bad for Israel."

Benny Morris, an Israeli historian, commends the authors for "putting their finger on important affinities" but criticises the quality of their work, describing Icon of Evil as a "bad book": "they decidedly over-reach, and, given the poverty of their scholarship, they often fail to persuade, leaving the reader with the bad taste of propaganda." He comments that they "suffer not from pedantry but from overtly propagandistic aims. They are constantly beating an ideological drum. Their adjectives are a giveaway. Every anti-Semite or anti-Semitic text is 'virulent' or 'notorious.'" The book "abounds with errors of fact", and Morris describes as "obscene" the authors' digression into a counterfactual history in which the Nazis won the Second World War and exterminated the Jews of Palestine with Husseini's assistance. Despite this, Morris allows that "much of what [the book] says is soberingly truthful and to the point"

James Srodes of The Washington Times describes Icon of Evil, as "another attempt to take a valid avenue for historical exploration and hype its sales" by drawing questionable links between Islamism and Hitler. Srodes comments that Husseini's story "is important enough without embroidering it with swastikas", noting the role that Husseini played in fomenting anti-Jewish riots and murders in British-ruled Palestine. However, he criticizes the authors' rendering of the story as "shameful hype" that "merely confuses the larger story ... [by] try[ing] to draw a direct line from Adolf Hitler to al-Husseini and then to his distant cousin Yasser Arafat, let alone to Saddam Hussein."

Kirkus Reviews is similarly critical, noting that although the authors had done extensive archival research "their book is not a piece of sophisticated scholarship" and takes "reflexively pro-Israel positions". The book starts out as "[a]n insightful examination of a rarely studied aspect of World War II—the collaboration of Islamic political parties and Middle East regimes with the Nazis—[but] quickly evolves into a brief for the neoconservative worldview." The authors present "questionable broad-brush analysis" and "more speculation than is usually found in history books".

Other reviewers viewed the book favorably. Martin Sieff of The Washington Times wrote that "the authors tell this story soberly and well", and describes the book as "valuable" and "the first serious biography of the mufti to appear in 14 years". His main criticism is that the book is too short, and does not include materiel from German archives, which he proposes that the authors be encouraged to remedy with an expanded 2nd edition.

Writing in the Jerusalem Post, Jonathan Schanzer took a more positive view, describing Icon of Evil as an "exceptional" history that "paints a stark picture of Husseini's ties to the Nazis and his dangerous role in the Third Reich" and identifies "numerous parallels between the murderous Nazi ideology of the 1940s and the murderous jihadist ideology that dominates headlines today." However, like Morris he criticises the authors' detour into counterfactual history, calling it "an unnecessary tangent."

Jonathan S. Tobin of The Jewish Exponent also commended the authors for seeking to shine "a spotlight on a figure who deserves far greater attention than he has received in recent decades", but is critical of their "lack of original research", "sometimes uninformed guesses" and "egregious speculation that adds little of value to the existing literature on the subject", in particular the "especially annoying" use of counterfactual history. Nonetheless, he concludes: "Despite its flaws, Dalin and Rothman's book is on target when it concludes that Husseini was a seminal figure not only in the history of the Arab–Israeli conflict, but in the culture of the Muslim world."

The British writer David Pryce-Jones notes that Icon of Evil relies entirely on English sources, "ignoring the extensive literature in German and Arabic" including Husseini's own memoirs. The book is "long on indignation, more a brisk polemic than anything else." It engages in speculation, with "the tell-tale phrases 'one can imagine,' 'there can be little doubt' and 'it is not implausible to speculate' all appear[ing] on the same page."

John R. Bradley, a writer on Middle Eastern affairs, comments in The Straits Times that the book "makes a convincing case that Al-Husseini even had knowledge of and encouraged the Final Solution and should have been tried as a war criminal at Nuremberg." However, the second half of the book is "an absurd and self-contradictory effort" that is "undermined still more by truly shoddy scholarship." He suggests that the authors' motivation is "to link all criticism of Israel to anti-Semitism, and so implicitly damn all criticism of Zionism as effectively offering support for Al-Qaeda and its affiliates" and concludes that Icon of Evil is "most useful as an example of how history is distorted by those who use it only to promote a crude ideological agenda."

Marvin Olasky, editor of the American magazine WORLD, interviewed the authors Dalin and Rothmann about their book, in particular their claim of al-Husseini's "lifelong sponsorship of terrorism" and their claim that Al-Husseini became part of Hitler's "inner circle in Berlin, working closely with the top Nazi leaders, including von Ribbentrop, Himmler, and Eichmann" and agreed with their claims and conclusions.
