= Dennis Willis =

American film director

Dennis Willis (born January 17, 1967, in Fort Lauderdale, Florida) is an American film critic, radio and television personality, and writer, director and producer of short independent films. He hosts the weekly program Flick Nation Radio, and his At the Movies and Home Media Guide features can be heard on KGO AM in San Francisco. Willis' reviews, features and comments have also been heard on KKSF Newstalk 910 (San Francisco), WGN (Chicago), and WNSW (New York City) and WZHF (Washington DC) on the Voice of Russia network. He is the author of the annual Flick Nation Movie Guide and American Popcorn: Hollywood and the War on Common Sense; and is a member of the San Francisco Film Critics Circle and the Broadcast Film Critics Association.

== Radio and television ==
Willis originally appeared on radio to promote his TV program FilmTrip, but his radio job long outlasted the TV show. His At the Movies and Home Media Guide features have appeared throughout the week on KGO Radio, since 2005.

He currently hosts Flick Nation Radio, a weekly program that features TV and movie reviews, and industry commentary and celebrity guests, with Steven Kirk and Steve Wagner.

Willis also produced and co-hosted two film-based shows, Reel Life (1993) and FilmTrip (1997–98), with Steve Wagner, which aired on KGO-TV and KCWB (now KCWE) in Kansas City.

== Soundwaves ==
In 2008, Willis completed the final season as host, producer and editor of Soundwaves, a Bay Area-based music entertainment TV show that left the airwaves after a record-setting 25 years; he began hosting the show at the age of 16. Despite a rotating door of personalities over the years, Willis has primarily shared hosting duties with Steven Kirk and Joe McCaffrey.

== Film ==
Willis and Steven Kirk wrote and directed Unwrapped (2006), an independently produced short film about exploitation in the Internet age. Their short documentary The Life and Legacy of George Reeves was released on DVD in 2006.

In 2014, Willis directed and edited All You Need Is Myth: The Beatles and the Gods of Rock, based on Steve Wagner and Jade Sylvan's book of the same name. Then, in 2015, he co-wrote, with Norman Kline, and edited Changing Boundaries: The History of San Jose. The documentary was directed by Tricia Creason-Valencia.

== Books ==
Willis is the author of the Flick Nation movie guides, annual compendiums of current reviews and commentary about the entertainment industry. The 2011 edition was released on June 8, 2011.

== Fundraising ==
Since 1989, Willis and Steven Kirk have produced and hosted the annual Soundwaves Christmas fundraiser, a food-, clothing- and toy-drive which benefits local San Francisco Bay Area neighborhoods and noteworthy national non-profit organizations. The show is broadcast throughout the Bay Area and has raised 35,000 items.
