= Alfred J. Kolatch =

American rabbi and writer (1916–2007)

Alfred Jacob Kolatch (January 2, 1916 – February 7, 2007) was an American rabbi known for his more than 50 published books, notably The Jewish Book of Why and his books on Jewish names.

== Education ==
Kolatch was a graduate of Yeshiva College and the affiliated Teacher's Institute of Yeshiva University. Kolatch received his rabbinical ordination from the Jewish Theological Seminary, where he also received the Doctor of Divinity degree.

== Pulpit ==
From 1941 to 1948, Kolatch served as the rabbi of congregations in Columbia, South Carolina, and Kew Gardens, New York. It was serving as the rabbi in Columbia, South Carolina where Kolatch developed his interest in Jewish names, the subject of many of his later publications.

Kolatch also served as a chaplain in the US Army, and he was discharged in 1946 with the rank of captain. In addition, Kolatch served as President of the Association of Jewish Chaplains of the Armed Forces, and as Vice President of the Military Chaplains Association of the United States.

== Publishing ==
In 1948, Kolatch founded Jonathan David Publishers (named after his sons Jonathan and David), where he served as President and Editor-in-Chief. Jonathan David Publishers publishes non-fiction books, ranging from sports, biography, reference and Judaica books.

== Authorship ==
While Kolatch operated as a publisher, he also authored over 50 books, primarily published through his own publishing company. His most renowned series began with the Jewish Book of Why, followed by The Jewish Child's First Book of Why, The Jewish Book of Why: The Torah, and The Jewish Mourner's Book of Why). This series alone sold more than 1.5 million copies in English, French, Spanish, German, and Portuguese.

He published more books, however, on the topic of naming babies (and pets). Starting with his 1948 book These Are The Names, he published at least eight name-oriented books. In 1989 an article profiling Kolatch noted his expertise in baby naming as "Newspapers across the country have called Rabbi Alfred J. Kolatch the nation's foremost expert on naming babies." and in the Encyclopaedia Judaica (2nd Ed.), published in 2007, he was described as "Recognized as one of the world's leading authorities on Hebrew and English nomenclature".

== Books ==
- These Are the Names (1948)
- Our Religion: The Torah (1956)
- Sermons for the Sixties (1965)
- Names for Pets (1971)
- The Jonathan David Dictionary of First Names (1980)
- The Jewish Book of Why (1981)
- Fun in Learning About Passover (1983)
- The Complete Dictionary of English and Hebrew First Names (1984)
- The Second Jewish Book of Why (1985)
- Today's Best Baby Names (1986)
- The Concise Family Seder (1987)
- The Jewish Home Advisor (1990)
- The Family Seder (1991)
- The Jewish Child's First Book of Why (1992)
- Classic Bible Stories for Jewish Children (1994)
- El Libro Judio del Por Que (1994)
- The New Name Dictionary (1994)
- A Handbook for the Jewish Home (1995)
- Great Jewish Quotations (1996)
- A Child's First Book of Jewish Holidays (1997)
- How to Live a Jewish Life (1997)
- Let's Celebrate Our Jewish Holidays! (1997)
- Best Baby Names for Jewish Children (1998)
- The Jewish Heritage Quiz Book (1999)
- What Jews Say About God (1999)
- The Presidents of the United States & the Jews (2000) with David G. Dalin
- Masters of the Talmud (2002)
- The Jewish Book of Why: The Torah (2004)
- The Jewish Mourner's Book of Why (2004)
- The Comprehensive Dictionary of English & Hebrew First Names (2004)
- Inside Judaism: The Concepts, Customs, And Celebrations of the Jewish People (2006)
