= Joanie Greggains =

American fitness instructor

- Born: Joan Catherine Ferro; February 18, 1944; San Francisco, California, U.S.
- Died: May 28, 2022 (aged 78); Marin County, California, U.S.
- Occupations: Fitness instructor, radio host, television personality
- Spouse: Kirk Lawrence (m. 1985)

Joanie Greggains, née Joan Catherine Ferro (February 18, 1944 – May 28, 2022), was an American fitness instructor.

Greggains was the radio host of The Joanie Greggains Show, a weekend health and fitness program on KSRO Radio, Santa Rosa, California. She was also known for her long-running television exercise show, Morning Stretch.

== Early life ==
Joan Catherine Ferro was born in San Francisco, California, the daughter of Gilda Catherine (née Lupertino), and Joseph Ferro, a bakery supervisor. Her parents were both first-generation Americans of Italian immigrants. Her mother died at age 37, when Joan was only 12 years old.

She married Raymond A. Greggains on August 10, 1968, in San Francisco, later ending in divorce in March 1975. Greggains married Kirk Lawrence, a personal trainer and her workout partner on Morning Stretch, on December 21, 1985 in Marin County, California.

== Education ==
She graduated from Abraham Lincoln High School in San Francisco in spring of 1961.

== Career ==
Greggains was a former school and physical education teacher. Her first television appearances were during the exercise segments on "People Are Talking with Ann Fraser and Ross McGowan", a locally produced talk show based at KPIX-TV in San Francisco, in the late 1970s. She continued to appear on the show until "Morning Stretch" made its national television debut in 1978. The show ran in broadcast TV syndication until 1995, moved to cable the following year, where it remained until 2000.

The show featured Greggains and her workout students in either a studio or outdoor environment (depending on weather conditions), with Greggains leading the exercises and bantering with "miked" off-camera crew members while working out. The show's success caught the attention of Elaine Powers fitness control salons, which was looking to expand its reach and strengthen its image. At the time, actress Suzanne Somers was at the height of her popularity and became well known for her health-conscious image. Because of Greggains' close physical resemblance to Somers, and her engaging, upbeat workout style, the company hired Greggains as its Fitness Programs Director. Greggains' role was to develop workout regimens and travel the country to promote Elaine Powers fitness salons when not working on "Morning Stretch" or her other line of fitness audio and video recordings.

She produced, choreographed and starred in 15 exercise videos, receiving two gold record awards, nine gold videocassette awards, and six platinum videocassette awards. Over 10 million copies of her exercise videos have been sold.

Greggains was a special advisor to the California Governor's Council on Physical Fitness and Sports. She was the founder of Fit Camps, which features the Fat Flush programs and taught exercise at her fitness center in Mill Valley, California.

Greggains resided in Northern California.

== Death ==
She died on May 28, 2022.

== Publications ==
- Greggains, Joanie, Total Shape Up, New Amer Library Trade, 1985, ISBN 0-453-00455-5
- Greggains, Joanie, Twelve Minutes to Super Stomachs, Metacom 1988, ISBN 0-88676-300-2
- Greggains, Joanie, Ann Louise Gittleman, The Fat Flush Fitness Plan, Contemporary Books, 2006, ISBN 0-07-144502-1
- Greggains, Joanie, Ann Louise Gittleman, The Fat Flush Plan, McGraw-Hill Publishing Co., 2003, ISBN 0-07-143547-6
- Greggains, Joanie, Romanowski, Patricia, Fit Happens: strategies for living a healthier, happier, fitter life, Villard, 1999, ISBN 0-375-50036-7
- Greggains, Joanie, White, Arthur, Back Health, Parade Video, 1990, ISBN 0-88149-364-3
