= Ray Taliaferro =

American radio host

- Born: Raphael Vincent Taliaferro; February 7, 1939; Queens, New York, U.S.
- Died: December 2, 2018 (aged 79); Paducah, Kentucky, U.S.
- Occupations: Radio host, Talk show

Raphael Vincent "Ray" Taliaferro (February 7, 1939 – November or December 2018) was an American radio host and political commentator. He joined KGO News Talk AM 810 (San Francisco) in 1977. In 1986, his talk show moved to the 1 to 5 a.m. early-morning time slot (Monday through Friday) and continued until December 2, 2011.

== Early life ==
Taliaferro was born in Queens, New York City, on February 7, 1939. His parents were Robert Winston Taliaferro (1904–1989, born in New York City) and Florence Durden Taliaferro (born c. 1915 in Georgia), with siblings Naomi Rosetta Taliaferro (1934–2001) and Robert Nathaniel Taliaferro (1937–2004).

In 1954–1955, Ray (a high school Junior) and his brother Robert ("Bob", a Senior) were attending Monterey Bay Academy ("MBA") in Watsonville, California (their family lived in San Francisco at the time). MBA is a private Christian highschool for boarding and day students, of the Seventh-day Adventist denomination. Ray and Robert were members of a singing quartet called the "Cosmopolitans".

Taliaferro grew up in the Hunters Point district of San Francisco. An accomplished musician, he conducted the "Ray Tal Chorale" and served as director of music for the Third Baptist Church.

== Broadcast career ==
Taliaferro was an on-air personality for KGO NEWSTALK AM 810. His principal role was as the host of a Monday through Friday phone-in radio talk show that aired between 1 a.m. to 5 a.m. The program was simply known as the "Early Show" and primarily consisted of lively (and sometimes confrontational) discussion of contemporary issues in American politics, culture, and current events. The program was on the air in this format and time slot since 1986. Taliaferro also routinely participated in charity and promotional events as a spokesman, moderator and panelist.

Taliaferro had been in broadcasting for over 40 years. He started in talk radio in 1967 at Oakland/San Francisco's KNEW (AM) (in 2012, KNEW switched its call letters to KKSF). Shortly thereafter, he also got into television, commuting every day to Burbank (by Los Angeles) to host a show on KHJ-TV (KCAL-TV) before accepting a news anchor position at San Francisco's KRON-TV. Taliaferro joined KGO Radio in 1977, when he also co-hosted KGO-TV's AM Weekend program.

Taliaferro was claimed to be the first African American talk show host on a major market radio station in the country in 1967. He helped found the National Association of Black Journalists in 1975, and was honored by the San Francisco Black Chamber of Commerce in 1994 with the Black Chamber Life Award, recognizing him as a "forerunner in broadcasting". Taliaferro was inducted into the National Association of Black Journalists Hall of Fame in 2011, and the association's Ray Taliaferro NABJ Entrepreneurial Spirit Award" recognizing "journalistic entrepreneurship" was named in his honor.

Taliaferro aired the last interview (a 58-minute interview) done with Walter Cronkite on his Monday, July 27, 2009, program, following the news of Cronkite's death.

=== Broadcast persona and format ===
Taliaferro's nighttime talk show mainly dealt with political issues affecting the United States and the state of California. He can best be described as a progressive Democrat and was one of the most prominent left-wing talk show hosts in the United States. He was known for his consistently strong (and often strident) criticisms of Israel, George W. Bush and other prominent conservative politicians, as well as conservatives who called his show. The Taliaferro show rarely featured guest interviews, but periodically featured special broadcasts related to poetry and music.

Taliaferro discussed "scary" callers in a November 1988 article in the San Francisco Chronicle, noting that several women have shown up at the station to meet him and he has had to get security to stop them.

Taliaferro was a lifelong Democrat, and endorsed Barack Obama for the 2008 Democratic presidential nomination and election. He was president of the San Francisco chapter of the NAACP from 1968 to 1971.

== Public service ==
Although Taliaferro was widely known for his role as an on-air radio personality, he has also been personally acknowledged for his active involvement in the arts and community service. Taliaferro dedicated considerable time and energy to public service to San Francisco, his home town.

Among his many achievements, Taliaferro served as president of the San Francisco chapter of the NAACP, and the Frederick Douglass Symposium. Because of his tremendous efforts to help raise money for leukemia research, he was named board president of the Northern California Chapter of the Leukemia Society of America for 1995 through 2000. He was the Mayor's Commissioner of the War Memorial Trustee Board from 1992 through 2000, and he headed up the San Francisco Art Commission for 16 years. He hosted events and served as a member of the Board of Governors of The Commonwealth Club of California.

Ray Taliaferro also performed as music director with his Ray Tal Chorale for Dr. Martin Luther King's June 30, 1964 service at the Cow Palace to a standing-room-only audience just south of San Francisco. His most thrilling tactic, first observed during the Reagan administration, was to simply challenge callers to "Name one thing (the president) has done." Ray's life's work and talent for informing listeners continues to motivate his audience into the 2020s.

== Personal life and death ==
Taliaferro was first married to Carolyn Theodosia McAdoo in Los Angeles County. They had three sons. He was remarried to Charlotte Crawford in June 2018.

Taliaferro was reported missing by his wife on November 10, 2018, during a visit to Massac County, Illinois. He was seen later the same day in Paducah, Kentucky, possibly suffering from dementia. He was found dead on December 2, a mile from Paducah. Autopsy results showed Taliaferro died from a combination of hypertensive cardiovascular disease with a likely contribution from hypothermia and environmental exposure. Taliaferro's son, Raphael Jr., hired a private investigator to investigate his father's death.

The Commonwealth Club hosted a memorial for Mr. Taliaferro in San Francisco on January 14, 2019.

== Trivia ==
An aircheck of Taliaferro, from KGO, was sampled by Brian Eno and David Byrne and used on "America Is Waiting", the first track on My Life in the Bush of Ghosts. The album was recorded at Wally Heider Studios, around the corner from the KGO radio studios, then at 277 Golden Gate Avenue, San Francisco.

== See also ==
- KGO (AM)
