= Chip Franklin =

American talk show host, writer, producer, filmmaker, comedian and musician

- Born: Charles Franklin; Washington, DC, USA
- Occupations: Writer, Musician, Talk Show Host, Actor, Comedian
- Awards: National Edward R. Murrow award for Writing (2004) and Overall Excellence, Four Regional Edward R. Murrow Awards, Six Achievement in Radio BEST TALK SHOW HOST AWARDS, and 27 Associated Press awards for broadcasting, NY Festival Award for Unconventional Coverage of Republican and Democratic Convention Ten Talkers Magazine Top 100 honors.
- Website: http://www.ChipFranklin.com/

Chip Franklin is an American liberal talk show host, writer, producer, filmmaker, comedian and musician. He has hosted radio talk shows from 1994 to 2021 from Washington, DC to San Francisco, on WMAL, WBAL, KOGO and most recently on KGO San Francisco. The Washington Post's Marc Fisher says "Franklin adds a rare dose of irony to a medium that rarely trusts its audience to get the joke."

Born in March 1956 in Alexandria, VA, Franklin is the youngest of five children. His father was a Washington, DC police officer and his mother worked in the U.S. Attorney's office. Franklin is married and has two sons.

Franklin is the winner of the National Edward R. Murrow award for writing (2004). Using humor to voice his opinion on government policies, he has also won two National Edward R. Murrow awards and five regional Murrows for his satirical essays on politics. Speed Bumps and Guns: The Dark Insides of Talk Radio is a book chronicling the effects of conservative talk released in 2022.

He has also won five Achievement in Radio Best Talk Show Host awards. Talkers Magazine has listed Franklin as one of the top 100 talk show hosts in the country for five straight years, most recently at #62 in the 2021 edition of the Heavy 100.

Franklin has appeared on numerous networks and shows including Showtime, A&E Evening at The Improv, The O'Reilly Factor, Laura Ingraham, Tucker Carlson, CNN, Paula Zahn, Fox and Friends, The Situation Room, and MSNBC. He appeared as himself on two episodes of HBO's The Wire. His series, ARRESTED INTELLIGENCE, which features random, on-the-street interviews, generated national buzz and a feature on CNN in early 2007 when he asked people if they still blamed Barack Obama for 9/11. He has continued with this segment in San Diego and San Francisco. The produced segments are available as podcasts at ChipFranklin.com.

A show on WBAL 1090 AM that featured the Commissioner of the Baltimore Police Department was subpoenaed by a federal grand jury. Franklin was heard from 9:00 a.m. to noon in Baltimore.

Franklin has written, edited and hosted more than 2000 videos, with a cumulative viewership of over 100 million people. Followed on Twitter by more than 1/4 of a million people, including personalities like Dan Rather, Ben Stiller, Jane Lynch, and dozens of members of Congress, Franklin's tweets are redistributed by Newsweek, The New York Times, The Washington Post and dozens of other publications. Franklin has also appeared on CNN, MSNBC, CBS Morning Show, The O’Reilly Factor, Fox and Friends, Laura Ingraham, and Tucker Carlson. He was banned on FOX for holding a picture of John McCain in an attempt to taunt then-president Donald Trump. He has written and directed award-winning short films .

A veteran stand-up comic, Franklin has headlined thousands of shows as a stand-up, speaker, and featured guest. He has over a dozen appearances on national television, including Evening at The Improv, Comic Strip Live, VH-1 Standup Spotlight, MTV, Comedy Central, the CBS Morning Show, and The A-List on A&E. He has also written for The Tonight Show, Steve Allen and wrote a joke for Stephen Hawking. Franklin also writes and directs short films and has won numerous awards from festivals in the U.S.

Franklin formerly hosted his own radio show weekdays from 3:00 to 6:00 p.m. on the legendary KGO radio in San Francisco. In a dramatic economic move, on December 3, 2021, KGO management bought out Franklin's contract, and significantly revised other host's schedules.

Franklin has performed stand-up comedy since 1980, appearing on network television and at over 700 colleges and clubs across the US and Canada. He has toured with Chicago, The Ramones and Kool and the Gang, as well as appearing at the Montreal Comedy Festival. Chip is currently working on a screenplay of the 1980s comedy boom, tentatively titled Crowd Work, and his non-fiction take on the comedy's sharp end of the stick, Punching Up: Comedians Speaking Truth to Power, set for release in 2026.

The Washington Post’s Joe Brown said of Franklin’s eponymous debut, A Dangerous Man, "The musicianship is practically peerless." The album featured the talents of Grammy winners Jon Carroll of The Starland Vocal Band and multi-platinum artist Mary-Chapin Carpenter. Franklin will release The Truth Is This in 2026, a collection of nine original recordings.
