= The Marsh =

American theater company in San Francisco, California

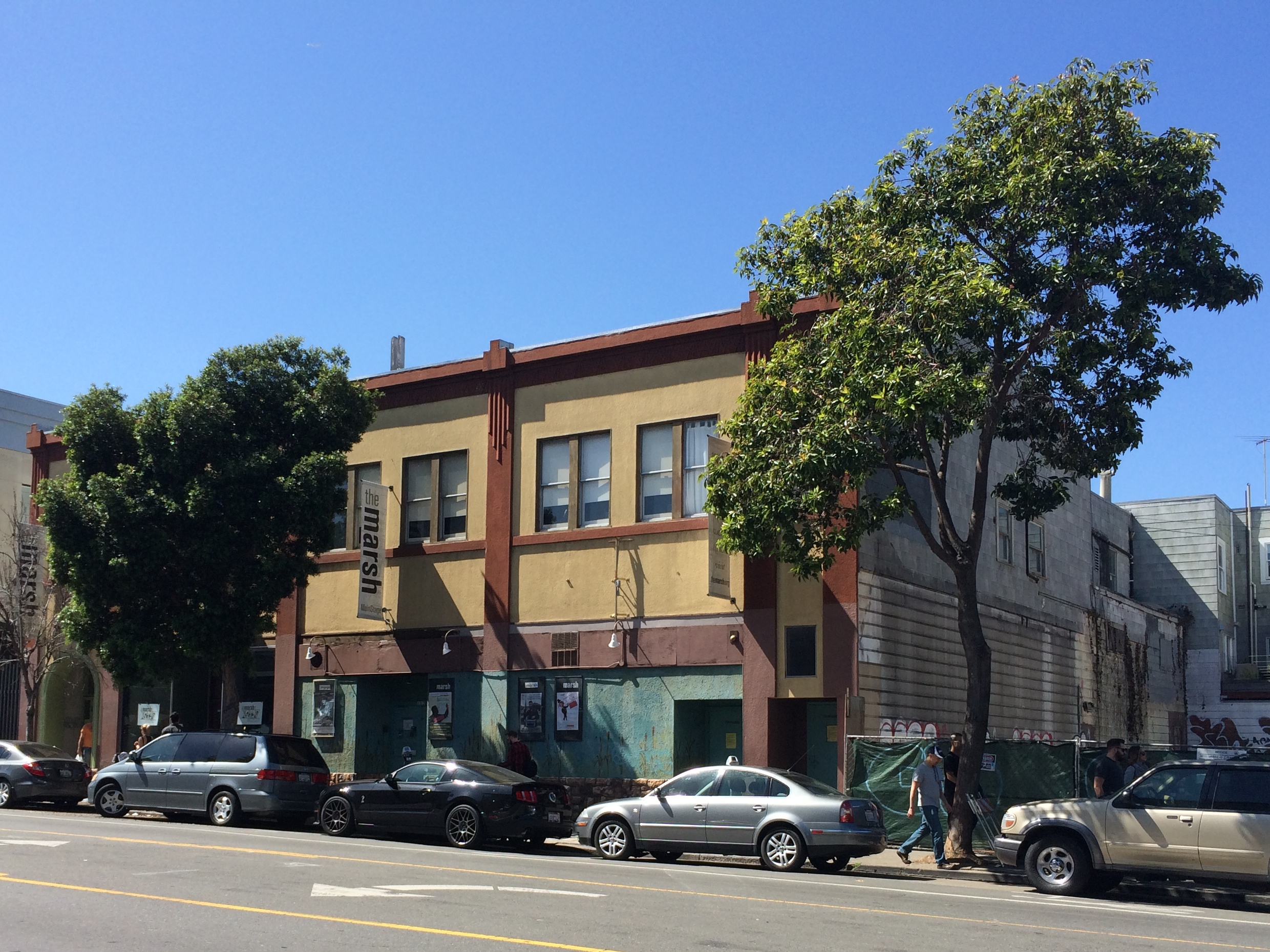
Location on Valencia Street

The Marsh Theater is an American theater company that specializes in developing new performance, founded in 1989. It has two venue locations, at 1062 Valencia Street in the Mission District of San Francisco, California; and 2120 Allston Way in Berkeley, California.

== History ==
The Marsh began in 1989 as a Monday night performance series with Peggy Howe and Stephanie Weisman at the legendary Hotel Utah, a historic drinking hole and performance venue. Competition with Monday Night Football drove The Marsh to Morty's in North Beach. In 1990, they moved The Marsh into the back room at the former Cafe Beano at 878 Valencia Street. They briefly operated out of the former Modern Time Books at 17th Street and Sanchez Street. In December 1992, The Marsh moved to its current location at 1062 Valencia Street, and they purchased the space in 1996.

The first staged workshop was Marga Gomez’s "Memory Tricks." Josh Kornbluth’s "Haiku Tunnel" was The Marsh's first full-length production, and Charlie Varon's initial solo piece "Honest Prophets" saw its debut there. In December 1992, The Marsh moved to its current location on Valencia Street. In 1996, The Marsh purchased the whole building, gradually developing the 12,000-square-foot (1,100 m^{2}) space into a community arts center. It recently has included two theaters, a comedy club, a cafe, and a youth theater.

In 2004, The Marsh produced the world premiere of Brian Copeland's solo show, "Not a Genuine Black Man." The production ran for two years, making it the longest-running solo show in San Francisco history.

In March 2020, as the COVID-19 pandemic shuttered theaters and venues across the San Francisco Bay Area, The Marsh had transitioned to an online broadcasting platform known as MarshStream and it provided a full calendar of live theater performances, workshops and interactive programming to patrons sheltering in place.

== Marsh Madness Competition ==
In 2018, up to 32 teams of one to five performers presented 40-minute unplugged performances over a 3-day weekend as part of a theatrical competition. Audiences voted for their favorite teams and each team scored based on votes and attendance. The top scoring teams advanced to the "Final Four Showdown" on Sunday, March 11, 2018, where a judging panel of Marsh VIPs and celebrities crowned one Marsh Madness champion with $1,000 and a weekend run of their show at The Marsh. Second to Fourth place received cash prizes, plus a Marsh Rising performance.

== Notable past performers ==
- The Residents
- Robin Williams
- Will Franken
- Don Reed
- Penny Arcade
- Brian Copeland
- Marga Gomez
- Josh Kornbluth
- Rick Reynolds
- Merle Kessler
- Charlie Varon
- Will Durst
- Mark Kenward
- Echo Brown
- Francesca Fanti
