= Ronn Owens =

American radio personality (born 1945)

Ronn Owens (born Ronald Lowenstein, 1945, in New York City) is an American radio broadcaster. Since 1968, he has hosted programs in multiple large cities and was the host of The Ronn Owens Report, a ten-minute weekday radio program airing on KGO in San Francisco, beginning in 2018. Owens has won multiple awards and got inducted into the Bay Area Radio Hall of Fame and the National Radio Hall of Fame.

== Career ==
Owens began his career in broadcasting in 1968 after graduating from Temple University. He hosted radio programs in Atlanta, Miami, Cleveland, and Philadelphia before moving to KGO Radio of San Francisco in 1975. In 2004, the Disney/ABC-owned station signed Owens to an eight-year guaranteed contract to continue hosting The Ronn Owens Program. At its peak, the program had more than 500,000 regular listeners.

Owens was off the KGO airwaves during an 88-day contract dispute that ended in February 1995. Reportedly, the dispute involved a difference of opinion over whether to allow national syndication of his show.

Between 1997 and 1998, Owens' show was simulcast in Los Angeles on KABC, also owned by Disney. Owens took the time slot held by Michael Jackson, whose ratings were declining. Despite signing a five-year contract to do the simulcast, after one year Owens vacated the time slot at KABC, because his show had failed to generate adequate ratings in Los Angeles. Owens reportedly blamed both Jackson and KABC — Jackson for "taking shots" at Owens "on the air and off the air" and KABC for failing to promote Owens' show. Disney reportedly bought out the remainder of Owens' simulcast contract.

Ronn Owens left his broadcast two hours early on Monday, September 17, 2007, after spending his first hour sounding very lethargic. He returned to the air on September 24, 2007, explaining that he had been diagnosed with transient global amnesia (TGA), a type of amnesia involving the sudden, temporary disturbance in an otherwise healthy person's memory. In Owens' case it was triggered by the adverse interaction of two prescription drugs.

On December 2, 2011, KGO fired all of its on-air show hosts except for Owens. He remained in the 9 a.m.-to-noon slot, with the other hours being all-news or Bloomberg Radio. On March 31, 2016, Owens announced that as of April 4, 2016 he would be moving to the 3 p.m.-to-6 p.m. slot on KGO's sister station, KSFO. On April 4, 2016, Owens announced that he would remain at KGO, but in a modified time slot of 10 a.m. to Noon. Owens has a personal services contract with the station that does not allow for early termination. Owens was paid more than $1 million per year, the highest salary for a broadcaster in northern California. On January 1, 2013, Owens signed a two-year guaranteed contract extension.

Owens was elected into the Bay Area Radio Hall of Fame in 2007 as a member of the second class to be inducted. In November 2015, he was inducted into the National Radio Hall of Fame in Chicago, which the Atlanta Constitution called "the greatest honor a radio professional can achieve." He has also won two Marconi Awards as "Large Market Personality of the Year" in 2003 and 2010.

After 42 years hosting his talk show on KGO Radio, on January 16, 2018, he began hosting a ten-minute feature, The Ronn Owens Report, which aired at 12:50 PM and 3:50PM weekdays. It featured interviews and observations from the "Voice of the Bay Area." The report contained interviews and observations from Owens on political and pop culture issues.

== Highlights and accomplishments ==
In 2002, Talkers Magazine named Owens one of its 25 Greatest Radio Talk Show Hosts of All Time. He was ranked 13th, making him the top local personality in the country.

In 2003 and again in 2010, Owens won the Marconi Award for Major Market Personality of the Year by the National Association of Broadcasters.

In 2006, he was named 2006 Talk Show Personality of the Year by Radio & Records.

In 2007, he was inducted into the Bay Area Radio Hall of Fame.

In 2015 he was inducted into the National Radio Hall of Fame.

== Personal ==
Owens is Jewish. He married to former KGO and KCBS Radio news anchor/talk host Jan Black. They have two daughters. Owens sold his home in the Sea Cliff neighborhood of San Francisco and moved to Scottsdale, Arizona in 2020.

In August 2014, Owens revealed that he had Parkinson's disease for more than 12 years. He indicated that his Parkinson's disease has progressed slowly and he did not want to make his condition public knowledge until that time. In part, the recent death of comedian Robin Williams, who also had Parkinson's disease, became the deciding factor in Owens' decision to go public on his condition.

Owens has claimed the criminal investigation and 14 felony charges relating to one of his daughters (Laura Michelle Owens), the previously disclosed Parkinson's disease as well as heart trouble and past cancer diagnoses and a police search of his home forced him to file bankruptcy. The bankruptcy court dismissed his petition, which could result in the foreclosure of his home.. On August 28, 2026, Laura Owens accepted a plea deal and pled guilty to Count 1: Fraudulent Schemes & Artifices (victim Clayton Echard), Count 6: Perjury (victim Clayton Echard), Count 9: Fraudulent Schemes & Artifices (victim Greg Gillespie), Count 10: Taking the Identity of Another (victim Mitchell – ultrasound). On October 23, 2026, Laura Owens was sentenced to 30 days in jail and 7 years probation for her her crimes.

== Bibliography ==
His first book, Voice of Reason: Why the Left and Right Are Wrong, was published in 2004 by John Wiley and Sons.
