= Bill Wattenburg =

American engineer and radio personality (1936–2018)

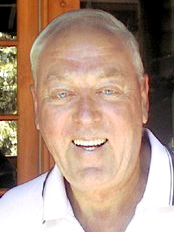
Bill Wattenburg, c. 2000

Willard Harvey Wattenburg (February 9, 1936 – August 2, 2018) was an American inventor, engineer, author, and talk radio show host from California. Advertisements for his show often referred to him as "The Smartest Man in the World."

== Early life ==
Born and raised in Greenville, California, in rural Plumas County, Wattenburg grew up working with his father in the logging business. His scientific talent was discovered by a teacher, who encouraged him to apply to several schools, including the University of California, Berkeley where he completed his first year with honors. After his freshman year, Wattenburg moved back to assist his father in his business, and graduated from California State University, Chico, summa cum laude in physics and electrical engineering, in 1959. He then returned to Berkeley for his doctorate in electrical engineering, in 1962, with professor Harry Huskey, completing it in three years, and worked at the Lawrence Livermore National Laboratory and as a professor at Berkeley 1962 to 1966. After that, he was a consultant to various engineering and defense-oriented businesses. He remained a consultant to the Livermore Laboratory until his death.

== Engineering ==
As an engineer, Wattenburg discovered many of the original problems with the Bay Area Rapid Transit system, including such flaws as easily decipherable fare cards (which could have fare value fraudulently added to them), trains that failed to show up on the computer screen, and other deficiencies. He published numerous articles in scientific journals and continued to do research as an adjunct professor at Cal State, Chico.

== Businessman ==
Wattenburg patented the first home alarm system using electrical wiring for its communication medium. Many of his ideas, such as using flatbed rail cars as temporary bridges, unenergized electric water heaters for storage of emergency potable water, and converting plow blades into minesweepers are deceptively simple variants of prior art or folk technology.

=== Mountaintop removal mine ===
In the 1980s Wattenburg set up his own gold mining corporation, "Wattexco". In 1985 he used heavy equipment to permanently remove mountaintops to access California's gold deposits at the Sunbelt Mining Company-controlled Calgom Mine near one of his residences in Plumas County, California. In contrast to the historic practice of gold panning in California, Wattenburg orchestrated mountaintop removal mining to get at the gold beneath an entire mountain in Plumas County.

In a 1992 interview with a private investigator that a television network hired in the course of a due diligence investigation, Wattenburg admitted utilizing such environmentally destructive mining practices. The investigator reported:

"The first task was to cut 2,000,000 tons of 'overburden' dirt and rock off the top of the mountain and move it a half mile away, where it was dumped into a deep canyon. Overburden is the dirt and rock on top of the ore body beneath it. The gold ore body was at a depth of two hundred feet below the surface ... Here is how one seasoned operator described it: '... he put maybe five or six of us on bulldozers to start pushing dirt on the mountaintop into this trench, up at the top of the trench. Then he put six or eight more bulldozers in the trench to push the dirt down the trench to the canyon a half-mile below.' "

== Radio talk show host ==
From 1972 to December 2, 2011, Wattenburg was the host of The Open Line to the West Coast, a talk show heard late Saturday and Sunday evenings 10 p.m. to 1 a.m. PT from San Francisco on KGO, AM 810 kHz. On the program, Wattenburg took calls from throughout the western United States. Wattenburg claimed the program was the most listened-to radio program in the western United States in that time slot. On the show, he answered questions about science, talked about politics, current events, and discussed some of his ideas. Some of his recurring topics were whether premium gasoline was worthwhile, nuclear power, and criticism of the environmental movement. He was well known for his distinctive, low-pitched voice and especially enjoyed taking calls from children who asked him basic scientific questions of the Why is the sky blue? variety. Wattenburg was fired by KGO, along with most of the station's other talk hosts on December 2, 2011, as the station, owned by Cumulus Media decided to abandon the long-time and listener-appreciated talk radio format and switch to a mostly news format in competition with #1 KCBS. KGO's website showed his former time slot would be replaced with Spencer Hughes.

In late 2011, Wattenburg began broadcasting on KSCO-AM, 1080, Santa Cruz, California. This was a few days after parting ways with KGO-AM. This continued until January 22, 2012, when he joined the Talk Radio Network

In 2012, Bill Wattenburg signed with Talk Radio Network and his show was available to radio stations nationwide in syndication. His program was called The Open Line to America. Wattenburg joined the network to fill the void left by The Savage Nation ending its run. The program aired Sunday nights from 8 p.m. to 11 p.m. Pacific Time. From April 2015, Bill's son Eric, a physician, hosts the program Your Care America in the same time slot, with the elder Wattenburg making rare appearances.

== Political views ==
He was generally considered a conservative; however, he espoused some traditionally liberal or libertarian positions on a handful of social issues, such as abortion rights. He was a strong supporter of former Governor of California Arnold Schwarzenegger, as well as former president George W. Bush and the invasion and occupation of Iraq.

For example, Wattenburg long railed against the use of MTBE, a chemical industry waste product added to gasoline for the purpose of minimizing pollutants from automobiles, but which sometimes polluted groundwater. Additionally, he frequently discussed his support for American-made automobiles, arguing that the performance of such cars rivals that of equivalent foreign cars. A longtime consultant at Lawrence Livermore National Laboratory, Wattenburg expressed strong support for nuclear power and anger at the Sierra Club and the environmental movement, as well as other public interest groups such Consumers Union for their opposition to nuclear power.

=== Firearms confiscation ===
Wattenburg openly suggested having standing armies on American streets and within American homes for law enforcement purposes, once remarking to a San Francisco Chronicle reporter, in regard to high urban violence in Oakland, California, "Our troops are going house to house removing weapons in Bosnia. Why not use them to do that in West Oakland or South Central Los Angeles?"

== Author ==
As an author, Wattenburg published two books for the general public: one book, Best Jokes From Talk Radio, is a compilation of risque jokes heard on talk radio; his second book, How to Find and Fascinate a Mistress, is a fictionalized version of Wattenburg's exploits with young women in the 1970s. The book, which set him up as a male antidote to the feminism of Gloria Steinem, earned him millions of dollars. It was published under the pseudonym Will Harvey. The book has long been out of print.

== Marriage and family ==
Wattenburg was married to his third spouse, Carol Wattenburg, 28 years his junior. They had two daughters; Wattenburg also had three children from a previous marriage.

== Appearance in films ==
Wattenburg made brief appearances in three Clint Eastwood films: The Dead Pool (Nolan Kennard), Pink Cadillac (pit boss), and True Crime (radio reporter).

=== Films ===
| Year | Title | Role | Notes |
|---|---|---|---|
| 1988 | The Dead Pool | Nolan Kennard | |
| 1989 | Pink Cadillac | Pit Boss | |
| 1999 | True Crime | Radio Reporter | (final film role) |
