= Gettleman =

Gettleman is a surname. Notable people with the surname include:

- Dave Gettleman (born 1951), general manager of the New York Football Giants
- Estelle Scher-Gettleman (1923–2008), actress who performed under the stage name Estelle Getty
- Jeffrey Gettleman (born 1971), American Pulitzer Prize-winning journalist for the New York Times
- Marvin Gettleman (1933–2017), American professor of leftist history
- Robert Gettleman (born 1943), federal judge on the United States District Court for the Northern District of Illinois
