= John Rothmann =

Former American radio host (born 1949)

John Francis Rothmann (born March 2, 1949) is an American former talk radio host on KGO in San Francisco.

== Political and academic career ==
Rothmann has a B.A. in political science (1970) and M.A. in teaching (1971) from Whittier College. He has worked for many political campaigns on the national, state, and local levels, including the Richard Nixon 1968 presidential campaign. Rothmann has also published articles on American political history, the Middle East, and education.

He is a frequent lecturer on American politics and the presidency and has spoken at over 150 campuses throughout the United States, Canada, and Israel. Since 2004, he has been a professor at the Fromm Institute for Lifelong Learning at the University of San Francisco.

Rothmann is co-author of the book Icon of Evil, released on June 24, 2008.

== Radio career ==
From 1996 until 2009, Rothmann hosted shows in the early morning hours every Saturday and Sunday. He also substituted for other hosts intermittently. On September 14, 2009, he became the host of the 10 PM through 1 AM slot Monday through Friday previously held by Bernie Ward.

On December 1, 2011, John Rothmann along with other KGO talk show hosts and staff, were dismissed by KGO management due to an all-news format change by the radio station.

On March 11, 2019, as part of the reshuffling of the on-air lineup, Rothmann returned to KGO, this time hosting an evening program airing weeknights from 6:00 to 9:00 p.m. As of April 2020, Rothmann was hosting live on Saturdays from 5:00 to 8:00 p.m. Rothmann continued on the air until KGO abruptly changed its format in October 2022.
