= Greg Jarrett (radio personality) =

American broadcast journalist

Gregory Jarrett is an American broadcast journalist who was a longtime news reporter in San Francisco, mostly at KGO (AM). He became the morning drive radio host on WGN (AM) in Chicago in June 2009, a position in which he remained until December 2011.

== Professional career ==
Jarrett was born in San Antonio, Texas; his family moved repeatedly, sending Jarrett to 16 grade schools and 3 high schools. His first radio job was as football play-by-play announcer for KANE (AM) when he was a high school senior in New Iberia, Louisiana.

Jarrett joined KGO-AM in San Francisco in 1986 as an aviation and space reporter. In 1991, Jarrett reported for KGO-AM and KGO-TV from Saudi Arabia during the Persian Gulf War, also filing reports for the ABC Radio Network. In late 1992, Jarrett flew to Somalia to join the mass of media greeting U.S. troops there. In 1993, Jarrett reported from Sarajevo, where mortar fire came through the window of his hotel room while he was elsewhere.

Jarrett left KGO-AM in 1994 to become a staff correspondent at ABC News.

From 1998 to 2000, Jarrett worked at KEWS-AM (now KPOJ) in Portland, Oregon.

Jarrett rejoined KGO in June 2000. In 2003, Jarrett was an embedded journalist assigned to the Purple Foxes (HMM-364) U.S. Marines helicopter squadron in Iraq. Jarrett was laid off from KGO in January 2009. Many of the staff at KGO were laid off by owner Citadel Communications around the same time.

On June 15, 2009, the management of WGN (AM) in Chicago announced that Jarrett would be joining the station on June 22, 2009 as its morning drive host. Jarrett would fill the position previously held by legendary Chicago talkers Wally Phillips, Bob Collins and Spike O'Dell. The most recent WGN personality to hold that slot, John Williams, replaced O'Dell but spent only six months in the slot; he moved to the 9 a.m.–noon slot at the same time Jarrett started as morning host.

On December 2, 2011, WGN announced that longtime Chicago radio personality Jonathon Brandmeier would replace Jarrett in the morning time-slot in a shift to a more personality-based program.

Jarrett joined Bloomberg Radio in 2013 and co-hosts Bloomberg Best.
