= Ann Louise Gittleman =

American nutritionist (born 1949)

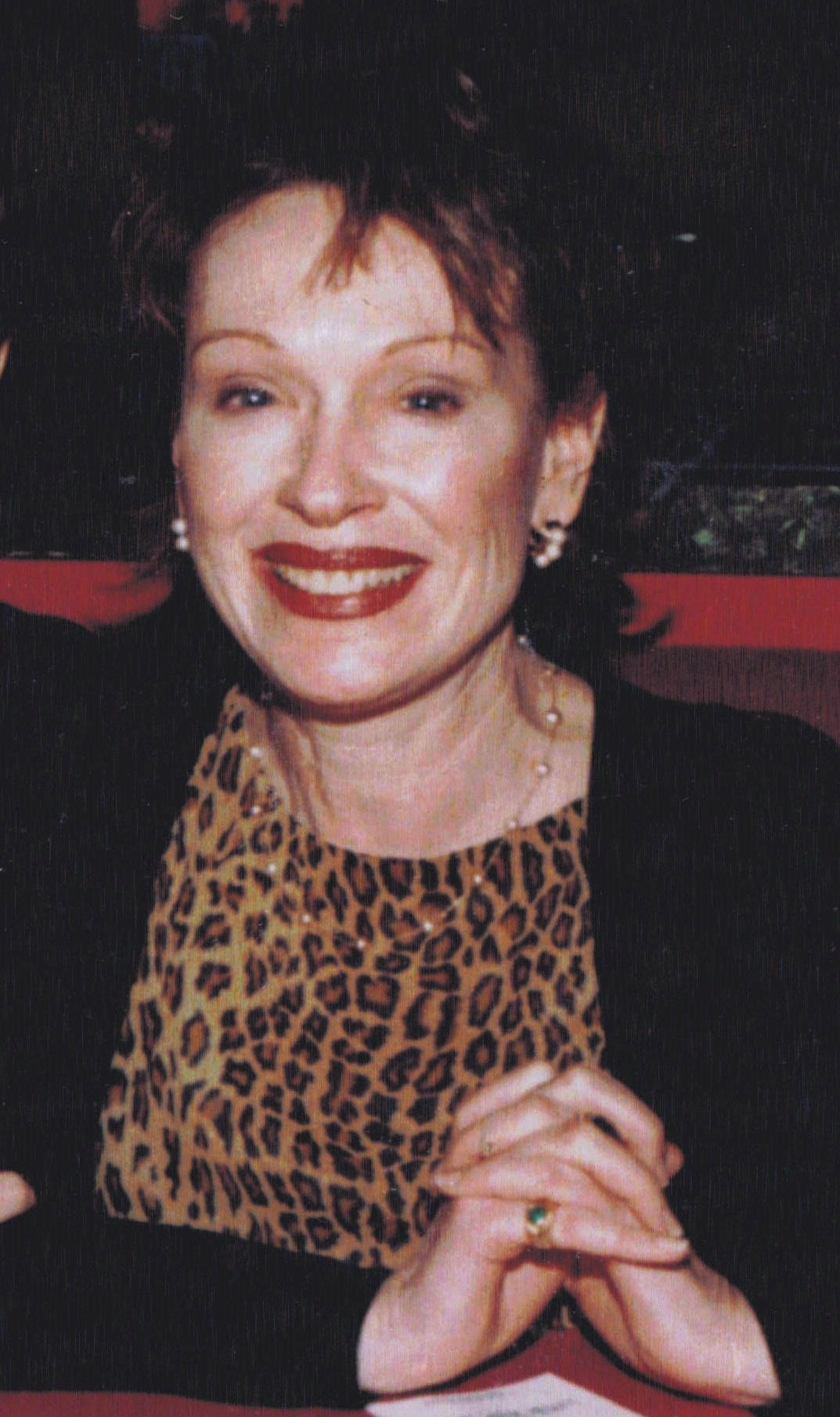
- Born: June 27, 1949 (age 77); Hartford, Connecticut, United States
- Education: Clayton College of Natural Health, Teachers College, Columbia University
- Years active: 1974–present
- Known for: The Fat Flush Diet
- Website: annlouise.com

Ann Louise Gittleman (born June 27, 1949) is an American author and proponent of alternative medicine, especially fad diets. She regards herself as a nutritionist. Gittleman has written more than two dozen books and is known for The Fat Flush Plan, a "detox" diet and exercise program that she developed into a series of books. Gittleman's ideas on health and nutrition are regarded as pseudoscience.

== Education and career ==
In 2002, she was given a Ph.D. in holistic nutrition from Clayton College of Natural Health, an unaccredited and now defunct diploma mill.

In 1994, she was featured in an advertising campaign for Rejuvex, a dietary supplement for menopause symptoms that is not supported by scientific or clinical evidence.

Gittleman has written many books on alternative medical ideas for health and nutrition. Her books have appeared on popular television programs, including 20/20, Dr. Phil, Good Morning America, and The Early Show. She has been criticized for promoting incorrect notions about medicine, diet, and electromagnetic radiation.

== Books ==
In 2001, she released her book The Fat Flush Plan, which became a New York Times best seller, reaching #14 on the "Hardcover Advice" list.

In May 2004, The Fat Flush Plan was described along with other low carbohydrate diets in a Time magazine story, The Skinny on Low Carbs.

Gittleman's books have been criticized as inconsistent with the best understanding of health and nutrition, and for presenting scientific research in a simplistic and one-sided manner.

Gittleman's suggestion to detoxify as part of the Fat Flush Plan has made her diet the subject of criticism from some nutritionists and medical doctors. Dr. Judith Stern, vice president of the American Obesity Society, has called the Fat Flush Plan "pseudoscience" that promises everything, but is "a fantasy".

Gittleman's 2010 book Zapped has been met with skepticism by reviewers who say the book incorporates non-scientific concepts to assert the danger of electromagnetic fields, and presents evidence in a biased manner.

Gittleman has written more than two dozen books advocating an alternative medicine approach to health and nutrition.

Select titles:

- Before the Change. HarperSanFrancisco. 1998. ISBN 978-0-06-056087-4. (Revised and Updated. HarperSanFrancisco. 2003. ISBN 978-0-06-056087-4. New York Times bestseller)
- The Fat Flush Plan. McGraw-Hill. 2002. ISBN 978-0-07-138383-7.
- The Fast Track Detox Diet. Morgan Road Books/Doubleday Broadway. 2005. ISBN 978-0-7679-2046-9.
- The Fast Track One-Day Detox Diet. Morgan Road Books/Doubleday Broadway. 2005. ISBN 978-0-7393-2020-4.
- The Gut Flush Plan. Avery. 2008. ISBN 978-1-61556-812-3.
- Zapped. HarperOne. 2010. ISBN 978-0-06-186427-8.
- Fat Flush for Life. Da Capo Press. 2010. ISBN 978-0-7382-1366-8. Top 10 Notable New Diet Books of 2010 by Time magazine
