= California Historical Radio Society =

The California Historical Radio Society (CHRS) is a non-profit organization centered on the history of radio and radio broadcasting, including related technologies such as vintage TV, amateur radio and HiFi. The focus is on the history of early radio and early radio broadcasting in California, especially the San Francisco Bay Area and the western states. Its museum and headquarters, known as "Radio Central," are located in Alameda, California.

== History ==
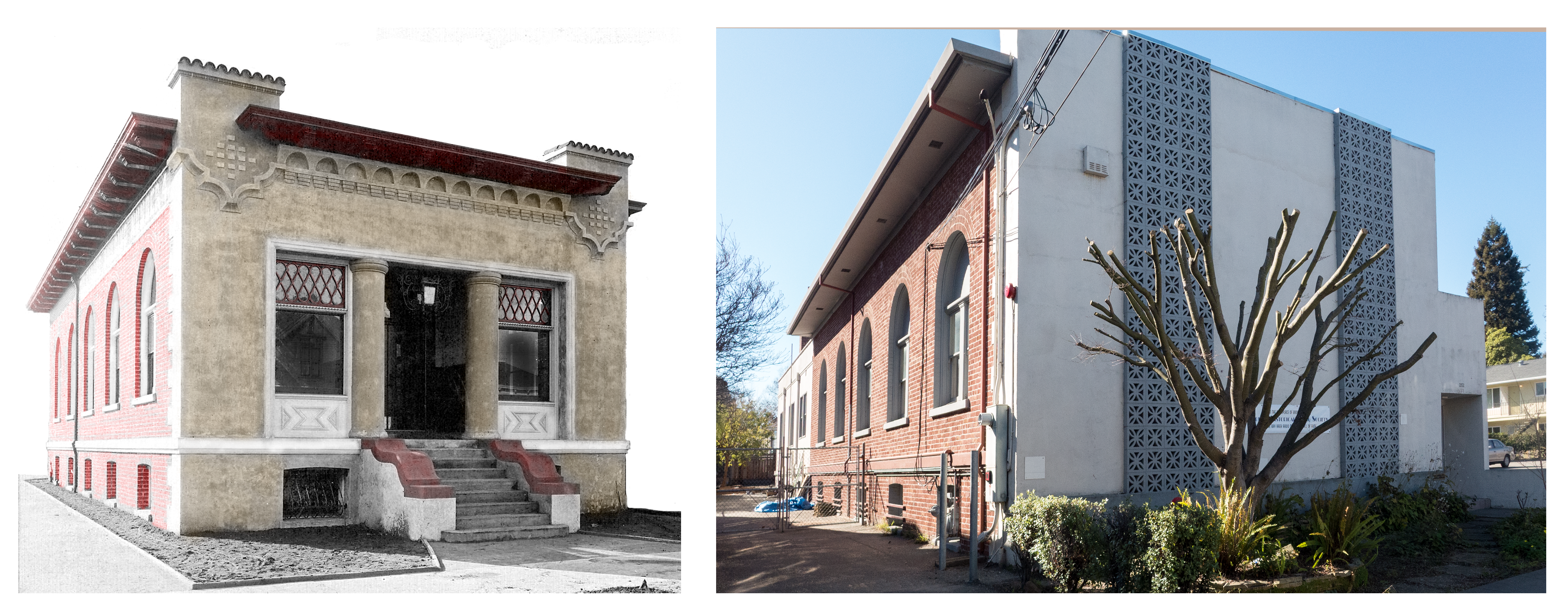
Then and now, 1901 and 2019 - CHRS Radio Central, main building, Alameda, CA, photos Mike Adams (colorized)

California Historical Radio Society (CHRS) was founded by Norman Berge, Jim Cirner, Gene Rippen, and several others as a non-profit corporation in 1974 and was qualified as an IRC 501(c)(3) tax-exempt organization. CHRS absorbed the web-only Bay Area Radio Museum and Hall of Fame, which was founded by David Ferrell Jackson in 2003, in Berkeley, California. CHRS then absorbed the Society of Wireless Pioneers (then managed by Waldo Boyd) by merger in 2012. CHRS later took custody of its archives and re-established its website, on which it publishes archival materials and commentary.

CHRS also took custody of the James Maxwell radio archives and library and succeeded it to their amateur radio callsign W6CF for its amateur radio operations. In 2014, CHRS moved to Alameda from its earlier temporary home at the historic Berkeley radio station KRE.

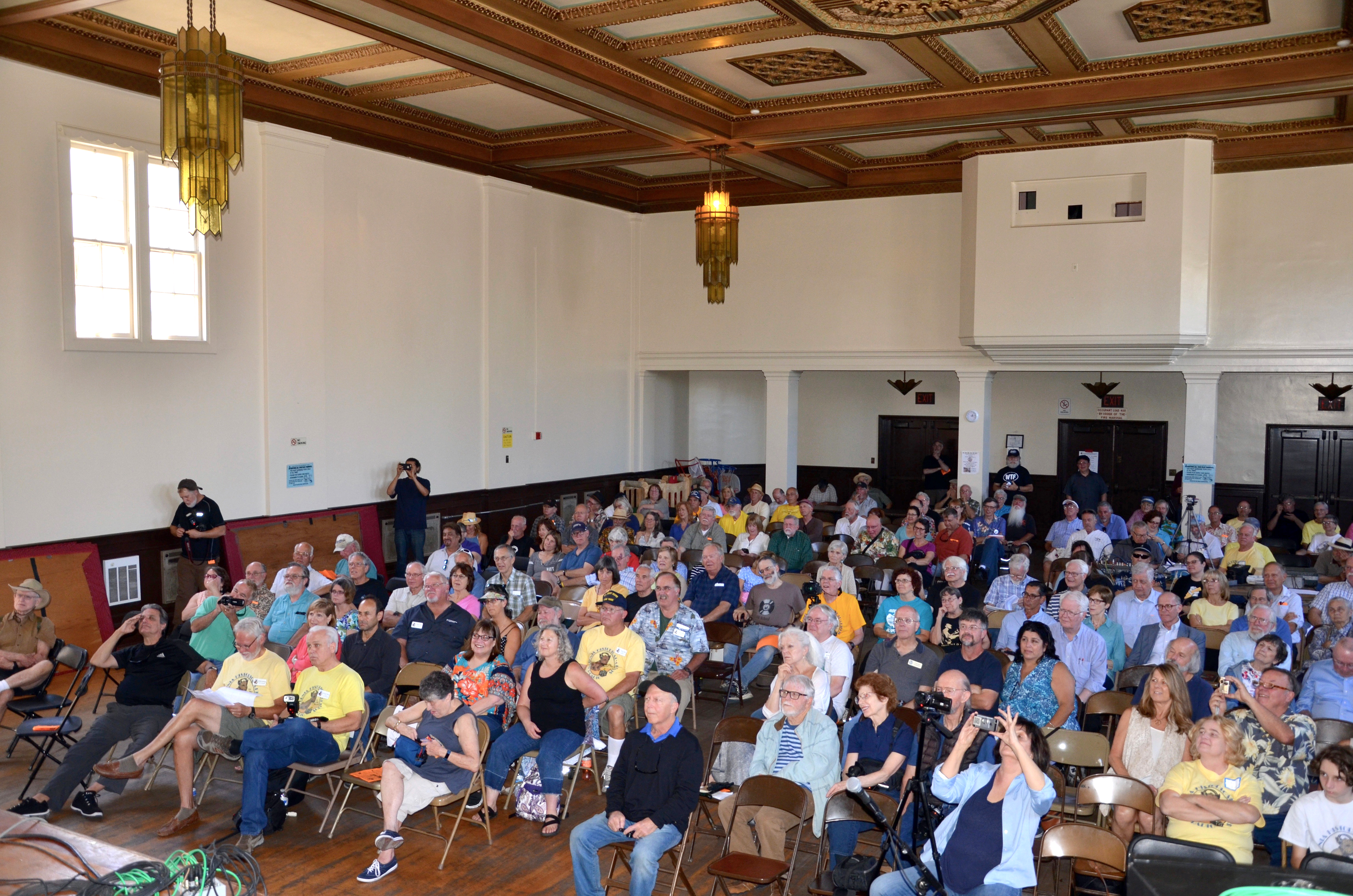
Radio Day by the Bay, 2017; photo Mike Adams

The CHRS annually hosts its "Radio Day by the Bay" fundraiser each summer, where traditional radio shows are performed. Each fall CHRS inducts notable local broadcasters into its Bay Area Radio Hall of Fame.

CHRS publishes texts, videos, and audio about radio history, radio restorations, and news of its current activities including amateur radio. The Society of Wireless Pioneers (SOWP) covers the men and women of early wireless telegraphy, especially sea-going radio operators, as well as their many evolving technologies. The Bay Area Radio Museum and Hall of Fame primarily honor local radio industry people and archives broadcast recordings, documents, photographs, historical information, and other ephemera from radio stations in the San Francisco Bay Area.

The CHRS Journal, managed by the Society, played a part in the recognition of the CHRS by the Antique Wireless Association (AWA) in New York, which bestowed its annual Houck Award (2015) and its Taylor Television Award (2020) on CHRS. AWA has also bestowed the Houck Award on two CHRS historians, Mike Adams (1995) and Bart Lee (2003), the (inaugural) Murray Award for the best article in the AWA Review on Bart Lee (2018), and in 2020 made Adams and Lee (inaugural) AWA Fellows.

Current activities in the museum include an evolving television history display managed by physicist Dr. John W. Staples. The W6CF amateur radio station operates both modern and vintage ham radio gear in its own "radio shack."
