= A Million Dreams =

2017 song from The Greatest Showman

Song by Ziv Zaifman, Hugh Jackman, and Michelle Williams

from the album The Greatest Showman: Original Motion Picture Soundtrack
- Released: December 8, 2017
- Recorded: 2017
- Length: 4:29
- Label: Atlantic
- Songwriter: Benj Pasek and Justin Paul
- Producers: Joseph Trapanese; Justin Paul; Alex Lacamoire

Audio
- "A Million Dreams" on YouTube

"A Million Dreams" is a song performed by Ziv Zaifman, Hugh Jackman, and Michelle Williams for the film The Greatest Showman (2017). It is the second track from soundtrack of the film, The Greatest Showman: Original Motion Picture Soundtrack, released in the same year. The song and its reprise both appear in the 2026 stage musical adaptation.

== Covers ==
In 2018, for Children in Need 2018, 1486 children sang the song live in unison from 9 towns across the UK as part of the Children in Need Choir. The performance started in the studio and as the children sang it cut between the different locations, in real time, giving each choir around 20–30 seconds on air, before going back to the studio to finish the song. The choirs sang from: Elstree at Elstree Studios a studio just outside of London where the main telethon was held, Southampton at King Edward VI School, St Ives at Tate, Belfast at The Ulster Folk and Transport Museum, Chester at Storyhouse, Lincoln at The New Theatre Royal, Glasgow at BBC Pacific Quay, Cardiff at The Broadcasting House and Wolverhampton at The Grand Theatre.

The Fron Male Voice Choir covered the song on their album Voices of the Valley Echoes, released in February 2020.

American singer Christina Aguilera covered the song during her performance at the Expo 2020 closing ceremony on March 31, 2022, in Dubai. Aguilera later performed the song again at the VinFuture Prize award ceremony on December 20, 2022, in Hanoi, Vietnam. In 2025, American singer Loren Allred, who recorded a demo version, released a duet cover of the song, featuring Filipino singer Regine Velasquez.

In late 2026, Filipino singer Colet Vergara covered the song at a floating restaurant on Loboc River in Bohol, Philippines.

== Charts ==
Chart (2017–2018)	Peak position
France (SNEP)	199
Ireland (IRMA)	45
New Zealand Heatseekers (RMNZ)	7
Scottish Singles Sales (Official Charts)	34
UK Singles (Official Charts Company)	22
US Bubbling Under Hot 100 (Billboard)	1

== Certifications ==
Region	Certification	Certified units/sales
Austria (IFPI Austria)	Gold	15,000^{‡}
Canada (Music Canada)	Platinum	80,000^{‡}
Denmark (IFPI Danmark)	Gold	45,000^{‡}
France (SNEP)	Gold	100,000^{‡}
New Zealand (RMNZ)	Platinum	30,000^{‡}
Poland (ZPAV)	Gold	25,000^{‡}
Portugal (AFP)	Gold	5,000^{‡}
United Kingdom (BPI)	3× Platinum	1,800,000^{‡}
United States (RIAA)	2× Platinum	2,000,000^{‡}
^{‡} Sales+streaming figures based on certification alone.

== Reprise ==
"A Million Dreams (Reprise)"

Song by Austyn Johnson, Cameron Seely, and Hugh Jackman

from the album The Greatest Showman: Original Motion Picture Soundtrack
- Released: December 8, 2017
- Recorded: 2017
- Length: 1:00
- Label: Atlantic
- Songwriter: Benj Pasek and Justin Paul
- Producers: Joseph Trapanese; Justin Paul; Alex Lacamoire

Audio
- "A Million Dreams (Reprise)" on YouTube

"A Million Dreams (Reprise)" is the reprise of the song "A Million Dreams" from The Greatest Showman: Original Motion Picture Soundtrack. The song like the original is sung by Hugh Jackman but is this time joined by his character's daughters played by Austyn Johnson and Cameron Seely.

=== Certifications ===
Region	Certification	Certified units/sales
Canada (Music Canada)	Gold	40,000^{‡}
New Zealand (RMNZ)	Gold	15,000^{‡}
United Kingdom (BPI)	Platinum	600,000^{‡}
United States (RIAA)	Gold	500,000^{‡}
^{‡} Sales+streaming figures based on certification alone.

== Reimagined version ==
"A Million Dreams"

Single by P!nk

from the album The Greatest Showman: Reimagined
- Released: October 24, 2018
- Recorded: 2018
- Genre: Chamber folk; Americana
- Length: 4:33
- Label: Atlantic
- Songwriter: Benj Pasek and Justin Paul
- Producers: Benj Pasek; Justin Paul; Joseph Trapanese; Greg Wells; Kevin Weaver; Pete Ganbarg; Alex Lacamoire

P!nk singles chronology
"Secrets" (2018)	"A Million Dreams" (2018)	"Walk Me Home" (2019)

Audio
- "A Million Dreams (Reimagined version)" on YouTube

On October 24, 2018, American singer P!nk released her cover of the song for the 2018 album The Greatest Showman: Reimagined. The song was the second single from the album and was released along with a cover of the reprise sung by P!nk's daughter Willow Sage Hart. Commercially, the song reached number one in the Netherlands, number two in Scotland, the top ten in Flanders, Iceland and New Zealand, and number 11 in the United Kingdom.

=== Charts ===
==== Weekly charts ====
Chart (2018–2019)	Peak position
Australia (ARIA)	26
Belgium (Ultratop 50 Flanders)	6
Belgium (Ultratop 50 Wallonia)	32
Canada Hot 100 (Billboard)	80
Canada AC (Billboard)	33
Croatia Airplay (HRT)	30
Czech Republic Airplay (ČNS IFPI)	24
Europe Digital Song Sales (Billboard)	3
France Downloads (SNEP)	81
Germany (GfK)	70
Hungary (Rádiós Top 40)	32
Hungary (Single Top 40)	21
Iceland (Tónlistinn)	6
Ireland (IRMA)	44
Luxembourg Digital Song Sales (Billboard)	6
Netherlands (Tipparade)	1
New Zealand Hot Singles (RMNZ)	7
Scottish Singles Sales (Official Charts)	2
Slovakia Airplay (ČNS IFPI)	7
Slovenia (SloTop50)	30
Switzerland (Schweizer Hitparade)	16
UK Singles (Official Charts)	11
US Billboard Hot 100	90
US Adult Contemporary (Billboard)	10
US Adult Pop Airplay (Billboard)	11
US Pop Digital Songs (Billboard)	3

==== Year-end charts ====
Chart (2019)	Position
Belgium (Ultratop Flanders)	87
Hungary (Rádiós Top 40)	93
Iceland (Tónlistinn)	70
US Adult Contemporary (Billboard)	15
US Adult Top 40 (Billboard)	43

Chart (2020)	Position
US Adult Contemporary (Billboard)	42

=== Certifications ===
Region	Certification	Certified units/sales
Australia (ARIA)	Gold	35,000^{‡}
New Zealand (RMNZ)	Gold	15,000^{‡}
United Kingdom (BPI)	Platinum	600,000^{‡}
United States (RIAA)	Platinum	1,000,000^{‡}
^{‡} Sales+streaming figures based on certification alone.
