= This Is Me (The Greatest Showman song) =

2017 song from The Greatest Showman

Single by Keala Settle & The Greatest Showman Ensemble

from the album The Greatest Showman: Original Motion Picture Soundtrack
- Released: December 8, 2017
- Recorded: September 14, 2017
- Genre: Pop
- Length: 3:54
- Label: Atlantic
- Songwriter: Benj Pasek and Justin Paul
- Producers: Greg Wells; Justin Paul; Adam Gubman; Alex Lacamoire

Keala Settle singles chronology
"This Is Me" (2017)	"Bird Set Free" (2018)

The Greatest Showman soundtrack singles chronology
"This Is Me" (2017)	"Rewrite the Stars" (2018)

Audio
- "This Is Me" on YouTube

"This Is Me" is a song performed by Keala Settle for the film The Greatest Showman. It was released on October 26, 2017, by Atlantic Records as a promotional single from The Greatest Showman: Original Motion Picture Soundtrack and the official lead single on December 8, 2017. It won the Golden Globe Award for Best Original Song at the 75th Golden Globe Awards and was nominated for an Academy Award for Best Original Song at the 90th Academy Awards. It was later nominated for the Grammy Award for Best Song Written for Visual Media at the 61st Annual Grammy Awards.

Following the film's global release, the song charted within the top five in the United Kingdom, the top ten in Australia, Ireland, Malaysia, and South Korea and the top twenty in Belgium (Flanders) and New Zealand. The song appears in the 2026 stage musical adaptation of the film.

== Live performances ==
The song was first previewed by Hugh Jackman in Australia during his 2015 Broadway to Oz tour. Keala Settle performed "This Is Me" live at Vision Australia's Carols by Candlelight at the Sidney Myer Music Bowl in Melbourne, Australia on December 24, 2017. She also performed at the Carols by Candlelight Rehearsal on December 23, 2017, and followed up with an encore performance. Settle performed the song live on The Graham Norton Show on February 9, 2018. Later she performed on The Ellen DeGeneres Show on February 21, 2018. She also performed the song at the 90th Academy Awards ceremony on March 4, 2018. It was also performed live at the closing ceremony of the 2019 Special Olympics World Summer Games in Abu Dhabi, United Arab Emirates.

== Track listings ==
Instrumental
No.	Title	Artist	Length
1.	"This Is Me" (instrumental)	The Greatest Showman Ensemble	3:54

Dave Audé remix
No.	Title	Artist	Length
1.	"This Is Me" (Dave Audé remix)	Keala Settle and The Greatest Showman Ensemble	3:36

Alan Walker relift
No.	Title	Artist	Length
1.	"This Is Me" (Alan Walker relift)	Keala Settle and The Greatest Showman Ensemble	3:35

Spanish version
No.	Title	Artist	Length
1.	"Así Soy"	Maite Perroni and The Greatest Showman Ensemble	3:55

== Charts ==
=== Weekly charts ===
Chart (2017–2019)	Peak position
Australia (ARIA)	10
Austria (Ö3 Austria Top 40)	31
Belgium (Ultratop 50 Flanders)	41
Canada (Canadian Hot 100)	74
France (SNEP)	52
Germany (GfK)	55
Hungary (Single Top 40)	23
Hungary (Stream Top 40)	39
Ireland (IRMA)	8
Japan (Japan Hot 100)	17
Japan Hot Overseas (Billboard)	1
Netherlands (Single Top 100)	92
Malaysia Streaming (RIM)	6
New Zealand (Recorded Music NZ)	13
Portugal (AFP)	61
Scottish Singles Sales (Official Charts)	2
Singapore (RIAS)	4
South Korea International Chart (Gaon)	9
Spain (PROMUSICAE)	63
Sweden Heatseeker (Sverigetopplistan)	3
Switzerland (Schweizer Hitparade)	60
UK Singles (Official Charts)	3
US Billboard Hot 100	58
US Adult Top 40 (Billboard)	40
US Dance Club Songs (Billboard)	3

=== Year-end charts ===
Chart (2018)	Position
Australia (ARIA)	24
Ireland (IRMA)	17
Japan (Japan Hot 100)	60
New Zealand (Recorded Music NZ)	44
UK Singles (Official Charts Company)	4
US Dance Club Songs (Billboard)	34

Chart (2019)	Position
UK Singles (Official Charts Company)	54

=== Decade-end charts ===
Chart (2010–2019)	Position
UK Singles (Official Charts Company)	46

== Certifications ==
Region	Certification	Certified units/sales
Australia (ARIA)	4× Platinum	280,000^{‡}
Austria (IFPI Austria)	Platinum	30,000^{‡}
Canada (Music Canada)	3× Platinum	240,000^{‡}
Denmark (IFPI Danmark)	Gold	45,000^{‡}
France (SNEP)	Platinum	200,000^{‡}
Germany (BVMI)	Gold	200,000^{‡}
Italy (FIMI)	Gold	25,000^{‡}
New Zealand (RMNZ)	3× Platinum	90,000^{‡}
Poland (ZPAV)	Gold	25,000^{‡}
Portugal (AFP)	Platinum	10,000^{‡}
Spain (Promusicae)	Platinum	60,000^{‡}
United Kingdom (BPI)	5× Platinum	3,000,000^{‡}
United States (RIAA)	4× Platinum	4,000,000^{‡}
Streaming
Japan (RIAJ)	Gold	50,000,000^{†}
^{‡} Sales+streaming figures based on certification alone.^{†} Streaming-only figures based on certification alone.

== Accolades ==
Award	Date of ceremony	Category	Result	Ref.
Academy Awards	March 4, 2018	Best Original Song	Nominated	
Critics' Choice Movie Awards	January 11, 2018	Best Song	Nominated	
Georgia Film Critics Association	January 12, 2018	Best Original Song	Nominated	
Golden Globe Awards	January 7, 2018	Best Original Song – Motion Picture	Won	
Grammy Awards	February 10, 2019	Best Song Written for Visual Media	Nominated	

== Kesha version ==
"This Is Me"

Single by Kesha

from the album The Greatest Showman: Reimagined
- Released: December 22, 2017
- Genre: Pop
- Length: 3:50
- Label: Atlantic
- Songwriter: Pasek and Paul
- Producers: Joel Little; Stuart Crichton; Greg Wells; Adam Gubman; Alex Lacamoire; Benj Pasek; Justin Paul

Kesha singles chronology
"Good Old Days" (2017)	"This Is Me" (2017)	"Woman" (2018)

Lyric video
- "Kesha - This Is Me (Official Lyric Video)" on YouTube

Kesha's version of the song was released on December 22, 2017. It had charted in Australia at number 71. This cover is included on the track listing of The Greatest Showman: Reimagined (2018), along with a remix that incorporates elements from both versions by Settle and Kesha, along with rapper Missy Elliott.

=== Music video ===
A music video of the Reimagined Remix was released on December 20, 2018. In support of the VH1 Save the Music Foundation, the video features the men from the Netflix series, Queer Eye, Antoni Porowski, Jonathan Van Ness, Tan France, and Bobby Berk (Karamo Brown does not appear in the video), helping three students, Olivia, Timmy, and J'Shawn, and giving them a "Much More Than a Makeover" experience and help prepare them for a talent show shown at the end of the video. At the talent show, Timmy raps Missy Elliott's second verse while the song is played over him, then J'Shawn showcases his dance moves, and finally Olivia sings the bridge to the song and all three are met with praise. The video was directed by Jared Hogan.

=== Charts ===
Chart performance for "This Is Me"
Chart (2018–2019)	Peak position
Australia (ARIA)	71
Scottish Singles Sales (Official Charts)	54
US Pop Digital Songs (Billboard)	22

=== Certifications ===
Certifications for "This Is Me"
Region	Certification	Certified units/sales
Australia (ARIA)	Platinum	70,000^{‡}
^{‡} Sales+streaming figures based on certification alone.

=== Release history ===
Release dates and formats for "This Is Me"
Region	Date	Format(s)	Label	Ref.
Various	December 22, 2017	Digital download; streaming	Kemosabe	
Italy	January 8, 2018	Radio airplay	Warner	

== Usage in advertising ==
A reworked version of "This Is Me" was used in a 2024–2025 advertising campaign for Wegovy, a weight‑loss medication. The campaign, titled "Power of Wegovy," aired thousands of times in the United Kingdom and featured a modified adaptation of the original song.
