= Never Enough (The Greatest Showman song) =

2017 song from The Greatest Showman

Song by Loren Allred

from the album The Greatest Showman: Original Motion Picture Soundtrack
- Recorded: 2017
- Genre: Orchestral pop
- Length: 3:27
- Label: Atlantic
- Songwriter: Benj Pasek and Justin Paul
- Producers: Joseph Trapanese; Justin Paul; Alex Lacamoire

Lyric video
- "Never Enough" on YouTube

"Never Enough" is a song written by songwriting duo Pasek and Paul and performed by Loren Allred for the film The Greatest Showman (2017). It is the sixth track on the soundtrack of the film, The Greatest Showman: Original Motion Picture Soundtrack, released in the same year.

On January 15, 2024, Allred released a re-recorded version of the song in streaming platforms as "Never Enough (Loren's Version)". The song and its reprise both appear in the 2026 stage musical adaptation of the film.

== Charts ==
Chart (2018)	Peak position
France (SNEP)	97
Ireland (IRMA)	16
New Zealand Heatseekers (RMNZ)	5
Scottish Singles Sales (Official Charts)	28
Spain (Promusicae)	81
UK Singles (Official Charts)	24
US Billboard Hot 100	88

== Certifications ==
Region	Certification	Certified units/sales
Canada (Music Canada)	2× Platinum	160,000^{‡}
Denmark (IFPI Danmark)	Gold	45,000^{‡}
France (SNEP)	Gold	100,000^{‡}
Germany (BVMI)	Gold	300,000^{‡}
Italy (FIMI)	Gold	35,000^{‡}
New Zealand (RMNZ)	2× Platinum	60,000^{‡}
Poland (ZPAV)	Gold	25,000^{‡}
Portugal (AFP)	Gold	5,000^{‡}
Spain (Promusicae)	Platinum	60,000^{‡}
United Kingdom (BPI)	3× Platinum	1,800,000^{‡}
United States (RIAA)	2× Platinum	2,000,000^{‡}
^{‡} Sales+streaming figures based on certification alone.

== Reprise ==
"Never Enough (Reprise)"

Song by Loren Allred

from the album The Greatest Showman: Original Motion Picture Soundtrack
- Recorded: 2017
- Length: 1:20
- Label: Atlantic
- Songwriter: Benj Pasek and Justin Paul
- Producers: Joseph Trapanese; Justin Paul; Alex Lacamoire

Audio video
- "Never Enough (Reprise)" on YouTube

"Never Enough (Reprise)" is the reprise of the song "Never Enough" from The Greatest Showman: Original Motion Picture Soundtrack.

=== Certifications ===
Region	Certification	Certified units/sales
Canada (Music Canada)	Gold	40,000^{‡}
New Zealand (RMNZ)	Gold	15,000^{‡}
United Kingdom (BPI)	Gold	400,000^{‡}
^{‡} Sales+streaming figures based on certification alone.

== Reimagined version ==
"Never Enough"

Promotional single by Kelly Clarkson

from the album The Greatest Showman: Reimagined
- Released: November 8, 2018
- Recorded: 2018
- Length: 3:24
- Label: Atlantic
- Songwriter: Benj Pasek and Justin Paul
- Producers: Benj Pasek; Justin Paul; Joseph Trapanese; Stint; Kevin Weaver; Pete Ganbarg; Alex Lacamoire

Lyric video
- "Never Enough" - Kelly Clarkson on YouTube

For The Greatest Showman: Reimagined (2018), the song was covered by American singer Kelly Clarkson.

=== Charts ===
Chart (2018)	Peak position
Scottish Singles Sales (Official Charts)	26
UK Singles (Official Charts)	59
US Digital Song Sales (Billboard)	14
