= The Greatest Showman (soundtrack) =

2017 soundtrack album

The Greatest Showman: Original Motion Picture Soundtrack
- Standard artwork

Soundtrack album by various artists
- Released: December 8, 2017
- Recorded: 2017
- Genre: Pop
- Length: 39:51
- Label: Atlantic
- Producers: Greg Wells; Benj Pasek; Justin Paul; Alex Lacamoire (also exec.); Adam Gubman; Chris Leon; Ryan Lewis; Ricky Reed; Jake Sinclair; Joseph Trapanese; Kevin Weaver; Pete Ganbarg

Pasek and Paul chronology
Dear Evan Hansen: Original Broadway Cast Recording (2017)	The Greatest Showman (2017)	Aladdin (2019)

Singles from The Greatest Showman: Original Motion Picture Soundtrack
- 1. "This Is Me" Released: December 8, 2017; 2. "Rewrite the Stars" Released: July 20, 2018

The Greatest Showman: Original Motion Picture Soundtrack is the soundtrack album to the film The Greatest Showman. It was released in full on December 8, 2017, by Atlantic Records. The album contains all of the film's musical numbers, but none of the film's underscore. The first pre-order release was on October 26, 2017, with two promotional singles: "The Greatest Show" and "This Is Me". A third, "Rewrite the Stars", followed on November 17, 2017. "This Is Me" was released on December 8, 2017, as the album's official lead single. In Australia, "Rewrite the Stars" was released to radio on July 20, 2018.

Produced by Benj Pasek, Justin Paul, and Greg Wells, the album became a global success following the release of the film, topping the charts in several countries including the United States, Australia, the United Kingdom and Japan. The album also reached number one on iTunes in over 77 countries. In the United Kingdom, the album was a commercial success and was the best-selling album of 2018. It became only the second album in 30 years to spend 11 consecutive weeks at number 1 and, in its 20th week atop the UK Albums Chart, it became the longest-running soundtrack at number 1 in 50 years. With combined sales of over 1.6 million, it was 2018's best-selling album in the United Kingdom. It was also the best-selling album of 2018 in the United States, with 1,491,000 in pure album sales, but third at 2,499,000 in album equivalent units.

The album's single "This Is Me" won Best Original Song – Motion Picture at the 75th Golden Globe Awards, and was nominated for Best Song at the Critics' Choice Movie Awards and Best Original Song at the 90th Academy Awards, but losing all two to "Remember Me" from Disney/Pixar's Coco. The album received positive reviews and has sold over 5.3 million copies worldwide. The album also won the Grammy Award for "Best Compilation Soundtrack for Visual Media" at 61st Annual Grammy Awards.

== Release ==
The first pre-order release was on October 26, 2017, with the soundtrack released in full on December 8, 2017, by Atlantic Records.

It debuted at number 71 on Billboard 200, and later stayed at number one for two weeks. On January 7, 2018, the soundtrack had been on the top of the Billboard 200 for two weeks, reaching its top in its fourth week of availability. It had sold 106,000 copies at that point. In its third week, it attained the number two slot. The Greatest Showman beat that week's top album in traditional album sales (70,000 vs. 65,000) and was the top-selling album of the week, but did not top the Billboard 200 due to TEA units and SEA units. As of December 2019, the album have sold over 1,731,000 pure copies in the United States.

By February 7, 2018, the soundtrack was a breakout hit at number 1 on the UK album charts and number 2 in the United States. On February 8, 2018, Stereogum published an article stating that "statistically speaking, The Greatest Showman is by far the most popular album of the year so far."

By February 27, it was the top album on iTunes. By March 23, 2018, it had been the number one in the UK for eleven straight weeks. It had sold 465,000 copies, with around 40% of those sales on CD and vinyl. By April 6, the album climbed back up the charts for its 12th non-consecutive week at number one. As of February 24, 2019, the soundtrack had totalled 28 non-consecutive weeks at number one on the UK official album chart, making it the longest reigning album of the decade, ahead of Adele's 21, which notched 23 weeks at number one.

== Critical reception ==
The album was selected for the 2017 Oprah's Favorite Things list. By February 23, 2018, the track "This Is Me" was nominated for Best Original Song at the 2018 Academy Awards. According to Sky News on March 25, 2018, "music critics have put the album's success down to the feel-good, uplifting pop tunes which are also old school at the same time."

Sheila O'Malley of RogerEbert.com called the 11 songs "memorable," praising the vocal performances of the leads. The women's magazine Bustle gave it a positive review, particularly certain vocal performances. Stereogum described the soundtrack music as eclectic in its influences, giving it a negative reception for "[serving] up earnest buoyancy in many high-fructose flavors." Also noting the eclectic mix of musical genres, The Ringer writes that "the bombastic tunes mix EDM gleams with stadium-rock grunts, chest-pounding ballads with peppy empowerment anthems, a thoroughly modern and disconcertingly eager post-genre assault designed to barnstorm as many Spotify playlists as possible. It's a gilded cheese ball, pushing exhilaration to the point of exhaustion." The Guardian wrote that the album brought "a whole lot of self-empowerment, enlivened with some deracinated R&B beats, and given the necessary gravitas by some power ballads of the sort that make one imagine the singer filmed from below with a wind machine blowing in their face."

== Live performances ==
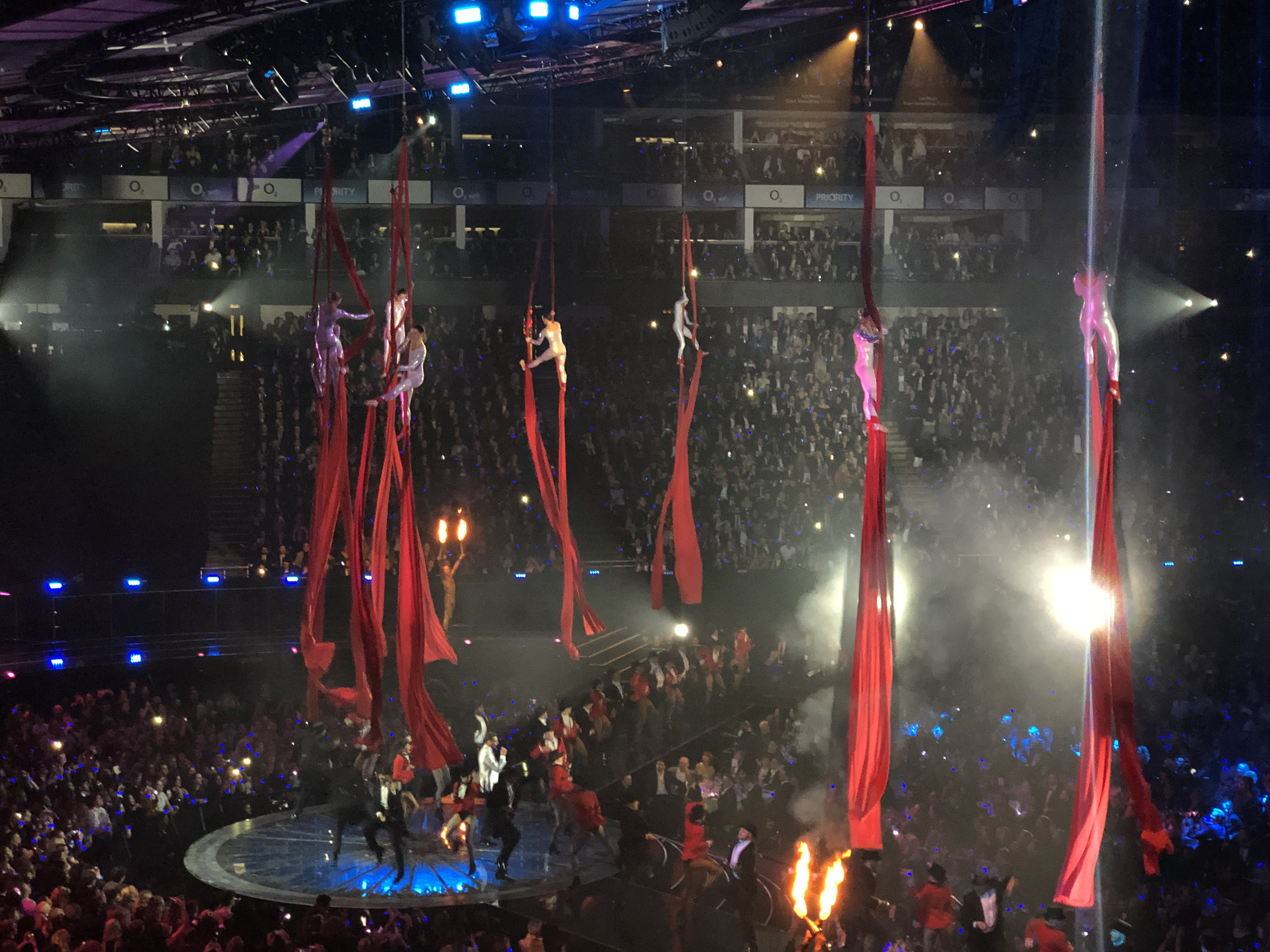
Jackman performing at the BRIT Awards 2019

Keala Settle performed "This Is Me" live on The Graham Norton Show on February 9, 2018. Later she performed it on The Ellen DeGeneres Show on February 21, 2018. She also performed the song at the 90th Academy Awards ceremony on March 4, 2018. She also performed the song on The X Factor in November 2018.

Loren Allred performed "Never Enough" live at "Church by the Glades" on April 16, 2018.

Hugh Jackman opened the 2019 Brit Awards with "The Greatest Show".

Settle performed "This Is Me" again on December 19, 2021 at the Royal Variety Performance.

== Accolades ==
Award	Date of ceremony	Category	Recipient(s) and nominee(s)	Result	Ref(s)
Golden Globe Awards	January 7, 2018	Best Original Song – Motion Picture	"This Is Me" – Pasek and Paul	Won	
Critics' Choice Movie Awards	January 11, 2018	Best Song	"This Is Me" – Pasek and Paul	Nominated	
Classic Brit Awards	June 14, 2018	Best Soundtrack	The Greatest Showman – Pasek and Paul	Won	
Academy Awards	March 4, 2018	Best Original Song	"This Is Me" – Pasek and Paul	Nominated	
Teen Choice Awards	August 12, 2018	Choice Music – Collaboration	"Rewrite the Stars" – Zac Efron and Zendaya	Won	
Teen Choice Awards	August 12, 2018	Choice Pop Song	"This Is Me" – Keala Settle and The Greatest Showman Ensemble	Nominated	
American Music Awards	October 9, 2018	Favorite Soundtrack	The Greatest Showman	Nominated	
Grammy Awards	February 10, 2019	Best Compilation Soundtrack for Visual Media	Hugh Jackman & Various Artists	Won	
Grammy Awards	February 10, 2019	Best Song Written for Visual Media	"This Is Me" – Pasek and Paul	Nominated	

== Track listing ==
All tracks are written by Benj Pasek and Justin Paul; track 1 co-written by Ryan Lewis.

No.	Title	Producer(s)	Length
1.	"The Greatest Show" (performed by Hugh Jackman, Keala Settle, Zac Efron, Zendaya)	Greg Wells; Jake Sinclair; Ryan Lewis; Justin Paul; Alex Lacamoire	5:02
2.	"A Million Dreams" (performed by Ziv Zaifman, Jackman, Michelle Williams)	Joseph Trapanese; Paul; Lacamoire	4:29
3.	"A Million Dreams (Reprise)" (performed by Austyn Johnson, Cameron Seely, Jackman)	Trapanese; Paul; Lacamoire	1:00
4.	"Come Alive" (performed by Jackman, Settle, Daniel Everidge, Zendaya)	Wells; Ricky Reed; Paul; Lacamoire	3:45
5.	"The Other Side" (performed by Jackman and Efron)	Wells; Sinclair; Paul; Lacamoire	3:34
6.	"Never Enough" (performed by Loren Allred)	Trapanese; Paul; Lacamoire	3:27
7.	"This Is Me" (performed by Settle)	Wells; Adam Gubman; Paul; Lacamoire	3:54
8.	"Rewrite the Stars" (performed by Efron and Zendaya)	Wells; Trapanese; Paul; Lacamoire; Chris Leon (Note: additional producer)	3:37
9.	"Tightrope" (performed by Williams)	Trapanese; Paul; Lacamoire	3:54
10.	"Never Enough (Reprise)" (performed by Allred)	Trapanese; Paul; Lacamoire	1:20
11.	"From Now On" (performed by Jackman)	Wells; Paul; Lacamoire	5:49
Total length:			39:51

=== Songs' charts and certifications ===
List of songs, with selected chart positions and available certifications
Title	Performer(s)	Peak chart positions								Certifications
Title	Performer(s)	US	AUS	CAN	IRE	FRA	NZ	SPA	UK	Certifications
"The Greatest Show"	Hugh Jackman, Zac Efron, Keala Settle, Zendaya, and The Greatest Showman Ensemble	88	42	—	9	110	— (Note: "The Greatest Show" did not enter the NZ Top 40 Singles Chart, but peaked at number 3 on the NZ Heatseeker Singles Chart.)	—	20	ARIA: 2× Platinum; BPI: 2× Platinum; RIAA: Platinum; SNEP: Gold
"A Million Dreams"	Ziv Zaifman, Hugh Jackman, and Michelle Williams	— (Note: "A Million Dreams" did not enter the Billboard Hot 100, but peaked at number 1 on the Bubbling Under Hot 100 Singles chart.)	—	—	45	199	— (Note: "A Million Dreams" did not enter the NZ Top 40 Singles Chart, but peaked at number 7 on the NZ Heatseeker Singles Chart.)	—	22	BPI: Platinum; RIAA: Platinum; SNEP: Gold
"A Million Dreams (Reprise)"	Hugh Jackman, Austyn Johnson, and Cameron Seely	—	—	—	—	—	—	—	—	BPI: Gold; RIAA: Gold
"Come Alive"	Hugh Jackman, Keala Settle, Zendaya, and Daniel Everidge	— (Note: "Come Alive" did not enter the Billboard Hot 100, but peaked at number 21 on the Bubbling Under Hot 100 Singles chart.)	—	—	70	—	— (Note: "Come Alive" did not enter the NZ Top 40 Singles Chart, but peaked at number 8 on the NZ Heatseeker Singles Chart.)	—	55	BPI: Platinum; RIAA: Gold
"The Other Side"	Hugh Jackman and Zac Efron	— (Note: "The Other Side" did not enter the Billboard Hot 100, but peaked at number 6 on the Bubbling Under Hot 100 Singles chart.)	—	—	54	—	— (Note: "The Other Side" did not enter the NZ Top 40 Singles Chart, but peaked at number 6 on the NZ Heatseeker Singles Chart.)	—	48	BPI: Platinum; RIAA: Platinum
"Never Enough"	Loren Allred	88	—	—	39	97	— (Note: "Never Enough" did not enter the NZ Top 40 Singles Chart, but peaked at number 5 on the NZ Heatseeker Singles Chart.)	81	24	BPI: Platinum; RIAA: Platinum; SNEP: Gold
"This Is Me"	Keala Settle and The Greatest Showman Ensemble	58	10	74	8	52	13	66	3	ARIA: 3× Platinum; BPI: 5× Platinum; MC: Platinum; RIAA: 2× Platinum; RMNZ: Gold; SNEP: Gold
"Rewrite the Stars"	Zac Efron and Zendaya	70	24	71	21	115	32	82	16	ARIA: 2× Platinum; BPI: 2× Platinum; MC: Gold; RIAA: 2× Platinum; SNEP: Gold
"Tightrope"	Michelle Williams	—	—	—	—	—	—	—	—	BPI: Platinum; RIAA: Gold
"Never Enough (Reprise)"	Loren Allred	—	—	—	—	—	—	—	—	BPI: Gold
"From Now On"	Hugh Jackman and The Greatest Showman Ensemble	— (Note: "From Now On" did not enter the Billboard Hot 100, but peaked at number 20 on the Bubbling Under Hot 100 Singles chart.)	—	—	65	—	— (Note: "From Now On" did not enter the NZ Top 40 Singles Chart, but peaked at number 9 on the NZ Heatseeker Singles Chart.)	—	71	BPI: 2× Platinum; RIAA: Gold; SNEP: Gold
"—" denotes a recording that did not chart.

== Personnel ==
Credits adapted from the liner notes of The Greatest Showman.

- Soundtrack album producers: Greg Wells, Justin Paul, Benj Pasek
- Soundtrack Album Producers for Atlantic Records: Kevin Weaver and Pete Ganbarg
- All tracks mixed by Greg Wells, except track 7 mixed by Manny Marroquin
- Executive music producer: Alex Lacamoire
- Music producers: Greg Wells, Justin Paul, Benj Pasek, Alex Lacamoire, Adam Gubman, Chris Leon, Ryan Lewis, Ricky Reed, Jake Sinclair, Joseph Trapanese
- Production music supervisors: Benj Pasek & Justin Paul
- Music coordinator: Jordan Carroll
- Music production supervisor: Ethan Popp
- Associate music production supervisor: Jason Michael Webb
- Music supervisor: Mark White
- Supervising musician and vocal contractor: Sandy Park
- Supervising vocal producer: Liz Caplan
- Vocal producers and coaches: Justin Paul, Carmen Key, Patrick Vaccariello
- Vocal arrangements: Justin Paul
- Supervising music editor: Jennifer Monnar
- On set music copyist: Benjamin Lively
- A&R contribution: Brandon Davis
- Marketing for Atlantic Records: David Grant
- Project coordinator for Atlantic Records: Kellie Gentry
- Business and legal affairs for Atlantic Records: Ben Landry
- A&R administration for Atlantic Records: Aryanna Platt
- Art direction for Atlantic Records: Mark Obriski
- Executive in charge of music for Twentieth Century Fox: Danielle Diego
- Music supervised for Twentieth Century Fox: Anton Monsted
- Music production supervised for Twentieth Century Fox: Rebecca Morellato and Brianne Porcaro
- Business affairs for Twentieth Century Fox: Thomas Cavanaugh and Lauren Caruso
- Music clearance for Twentieth Century Fox: Ellen Ginsburg

== Charts ==
=== Weekly charts ===
Chart (2017–2021)	Peak position
Australian Albums (ARIA)	1
Austrian Albums (Ö3 Austria)	3
Belgian Albums (Ultratop Flanders)	4
Belgian Albums (Ultratop Wallonia)	34
Canadian Albums (Billboard)	3
Croatian International Albums (HDU)	27
Czech Albums (ČNS IFPI)	16
Danish Albums (Hitlisten)	8
Dutch Albums (Album Top 100)	5
Finnish Albums (Suomen virallinen lista)	3
French Albums (SNEP)	11
German Albums (Offizielle Top 100)	5
Hungarian Albums (MAHASZ)	18
Irish Albums (IRMA)	1
Italian Albums (FIMI)	54
Italian Compilation Albums (FIMI)	1
Japan Hot Albums (Billboard)	1
Japanese Albums (Oricon)	1
Japanese International Albums (Oricon)	1
Mexican Albums (AMPROFON)	6
New Zealand Albums (RMNZ)	1
Norwegian Albums (VG-lista)	2
Scottish Albums (Official Charts)	1
South Korean Albums (Circle)	17
Spanish Albums (PROMUSICAE)	8
Swedish Albums (Sverigetopplistan)	32
Swedish Compilation (Sverigetopplistan)	1
Swiss Albums (Schweizer Hitparade)	4
UK Albums (Official Charts)	1
UK Compilation Albums (Official Charts)	1
UK Soundtrack Albums (Official Charts)	1
US Billboard 200	1
US Soundtrack Albums (Billboard)	1

Chart (2026)	Peak position
Portuguese Albums (AFP)	139

=== Year-end charts ===
Chart (2018)	Position
Australian Albums (ARIA)	1
Austrian Albums (Ö3 Austria)	16
Belgian Albums (Ultratop Flanders)	9
Belgian Albums (Ultratop Wallonia)	116
Canadian Albums (Billboard)	17
Danish Albums (Hitlisten)	54
Dutch Albums (Album Top 100)	22
French Albums (SNEP)	143
German Albums (Offizielle Top 100)	24
Irish Albums (IRMA)	1
Japanese Albums (Oricon)	15
Mexican Albums (AMPROFON)	32
New Zealand Albums (RMNZ)	2
South Korean International Albums (Gaon)	7
Spanish Albums (PROMUSICAE)	34
Swiss Albums (Schweizer Hitparade)	48
UK Albums (OCC)	1
US Billboard 200	4
US Soundtrack Albums (Billboard)	1

Chart (2019)	Position
Australian Albums (ARIA)	10
Austrian Albums (Ö3 Austria)	48
Belgian Albums (Ultratop Flanders)	16
Belgian Albums (Ultratop Wallonia)	121
Canadian Albums (Billboard)	32
Dutch Albums (Album Top 100)	29
French Albums (SNEP)	197
German Albums (Offizielle Top 100)	96
Icelandic Albums (Plötutíóindi)	44
Irish Albums (IRMA)	2
New Zealand Albums (RMNZ)	23
UK Albums (OCC)	3
US Billboard 200	14
US Soundtrack Albums (Billboard)	4
Worldwide Albums (IFPI)	19

Chart (2020)	Position
Australian Albums (ARIA)	38
Austrian Albums (Ö3 Austria)	30
Belgian Albums (Ultratop Flanders)	20
Belgian Albums (Ultratop Wallonia)	150
US Billboard 200	80
US Soundtrack Albums (Billboard)	2

Chart (2021)	Position
Australian Albums (ARIA)	55
Austrian Albums (Ö3 Austria)	14
Belgian Albums (Ultratop Flanders)	19
Belgian Albums (Ultratop Wallonia)	132
Dutch Albums (Album Top 100)	65
German Albums (Offizielle Top 100)	85
Swedish Albums (Sverigetopplistan)	97
Swiss Albums (Schweizer Hitparade)	53
US Billboard 200	145
US Soundtrack Albums (Billboard)	3

Chart (2022)	Position
Australian Albums (ARIA)	79
Austrian Albums (Ö3 Austria)	40
Belgian Albums (Ultratop Flanders)	35
Belgian Albums (Ultratop Wallonia)	183
US Soundtrack Albums (Billboard)	8

Chart (2023)	Position
Belgian Albums (Ultratop Flanders)	62
US Soundtrack Albums (Billboard)	6

Chart (2024)	Position
Austrian Albums (Ö3 Austria)	74
Belgian Albums (Ultratop Flanders)	53
Swiss Albums (Schweizer Hitparade)	70
US Soundtrack Albums (Billboard)	7

Chart (2025)	Position
Austrian Albums (Ö3 Austria)	67
Belgian Albums (Ultratop Flanders)	55
Swiss Albums (Schweizer Hitparade)	88
US Soundtrack Albums (Billboard)	9

=== Decade-end charts ===
Chart (2010–2019)	Position
Australian Albums (ARIA)	21
UK Albums (OCC)	10
US Billboard 200	13

== Certifications ==
Region	Certification	Certified units/sales
Australia (ARIA)	3× Platinum	210,000^{‡}
Austria (IFPI Austria)	2× Platinum	30,000^{‡}
Belgium (BRMA)	Gold	10,000^{‡}
Canada (Music Canada)	3× Platinum	240,000^{‡}
Denmark (IFPI Danmark)	2× Platinum	40,000^{‡}
France (SNEP)	Platinum	100,000^{‡}
Germany (BVMI)	Gold	100,000^{‡}
Ireland (IRMA)	—	64,400
Italy (FIMI)	Platinum	50,000^{‡}
Japan (RIAJ)	Platinum	250,000^{^}
New Zealand (RMNZ)	5× Platinum	75,000^{‡}
South Korea (Gaon Chart)	—	4,726
Spain (Promusicae)	Gold	20,000^{‡}
United Kingdom (BPI)	10× Platinum	3,000,000^{‡}
United States (RIAA)	4× Platinum	1,682,000
^{^} Shipments figures based on certification alone.^{‡} Sales+streaming figures based on certification alone.

== The Greatest Showman: Reimagined ==
The Greatest Showman: Reimagined

Soundtrack album by various artists
- Released: November 16, 2018
- Recorded: 2018
- Genre: Pop
- Length: 45:51
- Label: Atlantic
- Producers: Greg Wells, Justin Paul (also exec.), Benj Pasek, Kevin Weaver, Pete Ganbarg, Brandon Davis, Jordan Carroll

Singles from The Greatest Showman: Reimagined
- 1. "This Is Me" Released: December 22, 2017; 2. "Rewrite the Stars" Released: November 16, 2018

The Greatest Showman: Reimagined is a re-recording of the soundtrack, featuring new versions of the original songs now sung by the likes of Pink, Kesha, Kelly Clarkson, and more. The album was released on November 16, 2018.

=== Singles and promotion ===
The Kesha version of "This Is Me" was originally released as a non-album single on 22 December 2017, to promote the original soundtrack, but later featured on the soundtrack's re-release. Leading up to the album's release, the songs "A Million Dreams" and "A Million Dreams (Reprise)" performed by P!nk and her daughter Willow Sage Hart respectively, were released as promotional singles along with the pre-order of the album on October 24, 2018. On November 2, 2018, Panic! at the Disco's cover of "The Greatest Show" was released as second promotional single. On 16 November, the day the soundtrack was released, the video for James Arthur's and Anne-Marie's "Rewrite the Stars" was released.

=== Track listing ===
All tracks are written by Benj Pasek and Justin Paul; except "The Greatest Show" written by Pasek, Paul and Ryan Lewis and "This Is Me (The Reimagined Remix)" written by Pasek, Paul and Missy Elliott. Credits adapted from Tidal

No.	Title	Producer(s)	Length
1.	"The Greatest Show" (Panic! at the Disco)	Benj Pasek; Justin Paul; Jake Sinclair; Ryan Lewis; Greg Wells; Kevin Weaver; Pete Ganbarg; Alex Lacamoire; Jordan Carroll (Note: associate producer); Brandon Davis	2:54
2.	"A Million Dreams" (Pink)	Pasek; Paul; Joseph Trapanese; Wells; Weaver; Ganbarg; Lacamoire; Carroll; Davis	4:33
3.	"A Million Dreams (Reprise)" (Willow Sage Hart)	Pasek; Paul; Trapanese; Wells; Lacamoire; Weaver; Ganbarg; Carroll; Davis	0:48
4.	"Come Alive" (Years & Years and Jess Glynne)	Ganbarg; Weaver; Philsmeeze; Davy Nathan; Paul; Pasek; Davis; Carroll	3:35
5.	"The Other Side" (Max and Ty Dolla Sign)	Lacamoire; Ganbarg; Weaver; Wells; Sinclair; Paul; Pasek; Davis; Carroll	3:30
6.	"Never Enough" (Kelly Clarkson)	Pasek; Paul; Trapanese; Stint; Lacamoire; Weaver; Ganbarg; Carroll; Davis	3:24
7.	"This Is Me (The Reimagined Remix)" (Keala Settle, Kesha and Missy Elliott)	Philsmeeze; Adam Gubman; Wells; Nathan; Paul; Pasek; Ganbarg; Weaver; Lacamoire; Stuart Crichton; Davis; Carroll	4:25
8.	"Rewrite the Stars" (James Arthur and Anne-Marie)	Ganbarg; Weaver; Lacamoire; Zach Skelton; Trapanese; Paul; Pasek; Chris Leon (Note: additional producer); Davis; Carroll	3:38
9.	"Tightrope" (Sara Bareilles)	Bareilles; Pasek; Paul; Weaver; Ganbarg; Lacamoire; Neal Avron; Carroll; Davis	3:38
10.	"From Now On" (Zac Brown Band)	Brandon Bell; Ganbarg; Weaver; Matt Mangano; Paul; Zac Brown; Pasek; Davis; Carroll	4:20
11.	"The Greatest Show" (bonus track, Pentatonix)	Pentatonix; Pasek; Paul; Ben Bram; Weaver; Ganbarg; Carroll; Davis	3:25
12.	"Come Alive" (bonus track, Craig David)	Pasek; Fraser T. Smith; Paul; Weaver; Ganbarg; Carroll; Davis	3:47
13.	"This Is Me" (bonus track, Kesha)	Joel Little; Wells; Gubman; Lacamoire; CrichtonPasek; Paul	3:54
Total length:			45:51

Deluxe edition (bonus disc)
No.	Title	Producer(s)	Length
1.	"The Greatest Show" (performed by Hugh Jackman, Keala Settle, Zac Efron, Zendaya and The Greatest Showman Ensemble)	Greg Wells; Jake Sinclair; Ryan Lewis; Paul; Alex Lacamoire	5:02
2.	"A Million Dreams" (performed by Ziv Zaifman, Jackman, Michelle Williams)	Joseph Trapanese; Paul; Lacamoire	4:29
3.	"A Million Dreams (Reprise)" (performed by Austyn Johnson, Cameron Seely, Jackman)	Trapanese; Paul; Lacamoire	1:00
4.	"Come Alive" (performed by Jackman, Settle, Daniel Everidge, Zendaya and The Greatest Showman Ensemble)	Wells; Ricky Reed; Paul; Lacamoire	3:45
5.	"The Other Side" (performed by Jackman and Efron)	Wells; Sinclair; Paul; Lacamoire	3:34
6.	"Never Enough" (performed by Loren Allred)	Trapanese; Paul; Lacamoire	3:27
7.	"This Is Me" (performed by Settle and The Greatest Showman Ensemble)	Wells; Adam Gubman; Paul; Lacamoire	3:54
8.	"Rewrite the Stars" (performed by Efron and Zendaya)	Wells; Trapanese; Paul; Lacamoire; Chris Leon	3:37
9.	"Tightrope" (performed by Williams)	Trapanese; Paul; Lacamoire	3:54
10.	"Never Enough (Reprise)" (performed by Allred)	Trapanese; Paul; Lacamoire	1:20
11.	"From Now On" (performed by Jackman and The Greatest Showman Ensemble)	Wells; Paul; Lacamoire	5:49
Total length:			39:51

==== Songs' charts and certifications ====
List of songs, with selected chart positions and available certifications
Title	Performer(s)	Peak chart positions										Certifications
Title	Performer(s)	US	AUS	BEL	CAN	FRA	GER	IRL	SCO	SWI	UK	Certifications
"The Greatest Show"	Panic! at the Disco	— (Note: "The Greatest Show" did not enter the US Billboard Hot 100, but peaked at number five on the Bubbling Under Hot 100 Singles chart.)	—	—	—	—	—	39	22	—	82	RIAA: Gold
"A Million Dreams"	Pink	90	26	6	80	81	70	44	2	16	11	ARIA: Gold; BPI: Silver; RIAA: Platinum
"Come Alive"	Years & Years and Jess Glynne	—	—	—	—	—	—	—	69	—	80	
"The Other Side"	Max and Ty Dolla Sign	—	—	—	—	—	—	—	—	—	84	
"Never Enough"	Kelly Clarkson	—	—	—	—	—	—	—	26	—	59	
"Rewrite the Stars"	James Arthur and Anne-Marie	— (Note: "Rewrite the Stars" did not enter the US Billboard Hot 100, but peaked at number 24 on the Bubbling Under Hot 100 Singles chart.)	67	7	85	—	100	12	4	44	7	BPI: Platinum
"This Is Me"	Kesha	—	71	—	—	—	—	—	54	—	—	

=== Charts ===
==== Weekly charts ====
Chart (2018)	Peak position
Australian Albums (ARIA)	4
Belgian Albums (Ultratop Flanders)	17
Belgian Albums (Ultratop Wallonia)	86
Canadian Albums (Billboard)	12
Dutch Albums (Album Top 100)	55
German Albums (Offizielle Top 100)	47
Hungarian Albums (MAHASZ)	13
New Zealand Albums (RMNZ)	5
Swiss Albums (Schweizer Hitparade)	38
UK Compilation Albums (OCC)	1
US Billboard 200	3
US Compilation Albums (Billboard)	1

==== Year-end charts ====
Chart (2018)	Position
Australian Albums (ARIA)	50
Chart (2019)	Position
Australian Albums (ARIA)	54
US Compilation Albums (Billboard)	1

=== Certifications ===
Region	Certification	Certified units/sales
New Zealand (RMNZ)	Gold	7,500^{‡}
United Kingdom (BPI)	Platinum	300,000^{‡}
United States (RIAA)	Gold	500,000^{‡}
^{‡} Sales+streaming figures based on certification alone.
