= The Greatest Show =

Song from The Greatest Showman

Promotional single by Hugh Jackman, Keala Settle, Zac Efron and Zendaya

from the album The Greatest Showman: Original Motion Picture Soundtrack
- Released: December 8, 2017
- Recorded: 2017
- Length: 5:02
- Label: Atlantic
- Songwriters: Benj Pasek and Justin Paul; Ryan Lewis
- Producers: Greg Wells; Jake Sinclair; Ryan Lewis; Justin Paul; Alex Lacamoire

Audio video
- "The Greatest Show" on YouTube

"The Greatest Show" is a song performed by Hugh Jackman, Keala Settle, Zac Efron and Zendaya for the film The Greatest Showman (2017). It is the opening track from The Greatest Showman: Original Motion Picture Soundtrack (2017) and also serves as the opening and closing number of both the film itself and its stage musical adaptation. Despite not being released as an official single, "The Greatest Show" was the 18th biggest song of 2018 in the United Kingdom.

== Charts ==
=== Weekly charts ===
Chart (2018)	Peak position
Australia (ARIA)	42
Ireland (IRMA)	9
Japan (Japan Hot 100)	88
UK Singles (Official Charts)	20
Scottish Singles Sales (Official Charts)	18
US Billboard Hot 100	88

=== Year-end charts ===
Chart (2018)	Position
UK Singles (Official Charts Company)	18

Chart (2019)	Position
UK Singles (Official Charts Company)	90

== Certifications ==
Region	Certification	Certified units/sales
Australia (ARIA)	2× Platinum	140,000^{‡}
Austria (IFPI Austria)	Gold	15,000^{‡}
Denmark (IFPI Danmark)	Gold	45,000^{‡}
France (SNEP)	Gold	100,000^{‡}
New Zealand (RMNZ)	2× Platinum	60,000^{‡}
Poland (ZPAV)	Gold	25,000^{‡}
Spain (Promusicae)	Gold	30,000^{‡}
United Kingdom (BPI)	3× Platinum	1,800,000^{‡}
United States (RIAA)	2× Platinum	2,000,000^{‡}
Streaming
Japan (RIAJ)	Gold	50,000,000^{†}
^{‡} Sales+streaming figures based on certification alone.^{†} Streaming-only figures based on certification alone.

== Reimagined versions ==
"The Greatest Show"

Promotional single by Panic! at the Disco

from the album The Greatest Showman: Reimagined
- Released: November 2, 2018
- Recorded: 2017
- Genre: Pop rock
- Length: 2:54
- Label: Atlantic
- Songwriters: Benj Pasek and Justin Paul; Ryan Lewis

Audio video
- "The Greatest Show" (Reimagined version) on YouTube

"The Greatest Show"

Song by Pentatonix

from the album The Greatest Showman: Reimagined
- Released: November 16, 2018
- Recorded: 2017
- Genre: A capella
- Length: 3:25
- Label: Atlantic
- Songwriters: Benj Pasek and Justin Paul; Ryan Lewis

Audio video
- "The Greatest Show" (Bonus Track) on YouTube

For The Greatest Showman: Reimagined (2018), the song was covered by American rock band Panic! at the Disco and a capella group Pentatonix.

=== Critical reception ===
Rolling Stone's Ryan Reed wrote that the Panic! at the Disco's version "[...] stays faithful to the original's theatrical arrangement of brass fanfare and densely layered harmony vocals", and "beefs up the rhythm section with a booming drum sound and ends the track with a Queen-styled guitar solo.

=== Charts ===
==== Weekly charts ====
Chart (2018–2019)	Peak position
Canada (Hot Canadian Digital Songs)	40
Ireland (IRMA)	82
New Zealand Hot Singles (RMNZ)	21
UK Singles (Official Charts)	82
US Bubbling Under Hot 100 (Billboard)	5
US Hot Rock & Alternative Songs (Billboard)	10

==== Year-end charts ====
Chart (2019)	Position
US Hot Rock Songs (Billboard)	44

=== Certifications ===
Region	Certification	Certified units/sales
United Kingdom (BPI)	Silver	200,000^{‡}
United States (RIAA)	Gold	500,000^{‡}
^{‡} Sales+streaming figures based on certification alone.

== In other media ==
- The song was the official theme song for WWE's Backlash 2020 for "The Greatest Wrestling Match Ever".
- "The Greatest Show" is featured in the 2024 Marvel Cinematic Universe film Deadpool & Wolverine, which stars Hugh Jackman, the actor who played Barnum, as one of its titular characters, James "Logan" Howlett / Wolverine.
