= The Greatest Showman (musical) =

Stage musical based on the 2017 film of the same name

- The Musical
- World premiere production poster
- Music: Benj Pasek and Justin Paul
- Lyrics: Benj Pasek and Justin Paul
- Book: Tim Federle
- Setting: 19th-century New York City
- Basis: Film The Greatest Showman by; Jenny Bicks; Bill Condon; The life of P. T. Barnum
- Premiere: 15 March 2026: Bristol Hippodrome
- Productions: 2026 Bristol

The Greatest Showman is a 2026 stage musical with music and lyrics by Benj Pasek and Justin Paul and a book by Tim Federle. It is an adaptation of 20th Century Studios's 2017 film of the same name starring Hugh Jackman, Zac Efron, Rebecca Ferguson, Michelle Williams and Zendaya, which is a heavily fictionalized depiction of the life of P. T. Barnum (later of Barnum & Bailey Circus), a showman and entertainer, up to the point when he created his first circus. It premiered in the Bristol Hippodrome on March 15, 2026.

== Background ==
On March 5, 2024, Baz Bamigboye of Deadline Hollywood reported that a stage adaptation of the film was in development by Disney Theatrical Productions, set to premiere in Bristol, England, in Spring 2026 before heading to the West End and Broadway, following a workshop in Fall 2023. On August 9, 2024, at D23 Expo, Disney Theatricals staged a performance of "The Greatest Show", the opening and closing number of the film, which is also expected to open and close the show on stage. All of the songs from the film are expected to be included, with the film's songwriters, Benj Pasek and Justin Paul, contributing five new songs. The musical is also Disney's first stage adaptation of a 20th Century Studios film following The Walt Disney Company's 2019 acquisition of 21st Century Fox.

== Productions ==
=== Bristol (2026) ===
The musical premiered in Spring 2026 at the Bristol Hippodrome, directed and choreographed by Casey Nicholaw with Alex Lacamoire as music supervisor and orchestrator, and produced by Disney Theatrical Productions.

The production officially began performances on March 15, 2026, and ran until May 10. Casting included Oliver Tompsett as Barnum, Samantha Barks as Charity, Lorna Courtney as Anne, Ben Joyce as Phillip, Vajèn van den Bosch as Jenny, Malinda Parris as Lettie, and Stuart Matthew Price as James Gordon Bennett.

=== Planned West End production (2027) ===
A planned West End transfer was announced at the Disney D23 Summit. The show is expected to begin performances on 14 April 2027 at Theatre Royal Drury Lane with an official opening on 5 May. Oliver Tompsett, Samantha Barks, Lorna Courtney, Ben Joyce, Vajèn van den Bosch, Malinda Paris and Stuart Matthew Price are expected to reprise their roles from the Bristol production with further casting to be announced.

== Musical numbers ==
=== Bristol (2026) ===
Songs marked with an asterisk are new for the musical.

Act I

- "The Greatest Show" – P. T. Barnum and Ensemble
- "A Million Dreams" – P. T. and Charity Barnum
- "The Dust and The Dirt"* – Barnum and Ensemble
- "Come Alive" – Ensemble
- "The Other Side" – Barnum and Philip Carlyle
- "Skybound"* – Anne Wheeler
- "Tightrope" – Charity
- "The Show Goes On"* – Barnum and Ensemble

Act II

- "Unusual"* – Ensemble
- "Never Enough" – Jenny Lind
- "Rewrite the Stars" – Philip and Anne
- "Undeniable"* – Jenny and Barnum
- "This Is Me" – Lettie Lutz and Ensemble
- "From Now On" – Barnum
- "The Greatest Show (Finale)" – Ensemble

== Cast and characters ==
Character	Bristol
Character	2026
P. T. Barnum	Oliver Tompsett
Charity Barnum	Samantha Barks
Anne Wheeler	Lorna Courtney
Phillip Carlyle	Ben Joyce
Jenny Lind	Vajèn van den Bosch
Lettie Lutz	Malinda Parris
Caroline/Young Charity	Mia Raggio Angelica Pearl Scott Maya Sewrey
Young Barnum	Max Bispham Joel Tennant George Hamblin
Helen	Harly Gill Ellie McArdle Eleanor Sebastian
James Gordon Bennett	Stuart Matthew Price

== See also ==
- Barnum – Musical about Barnum; premiered on Broadway in 1980
