= Adam Gubman =

American songwriter

- Born: April 7, 1979 (age 47); Anaheim, California, USA
- Genres: Video game music, classical, pop, television program's soundtrack
- Occupations: Songwriter, arranger, composer
- Instrument: Piano
- Years active: 1994–present
- Label: Materia Collective
- Website: www.adamgubman.com

Adam Gubman (born April 7, 1979) is an American songwriter, arranger, and composer.

Gubman has composed music for more than 550 video games, as well as television soundtracks, advertising music and pop music. He has released several albums, but only two under his own name: "Sunday Rain" (1994) and "Dark Matter" (2014), a collection of 12 horror orchestral cues.

== Biography ==
Adam Gubman was born at Anaheim, California and raised in Southern California where he lives in 2016, Gubman spent a part of his adolescence in Plymouth, Minnesota. His grandfather introduced him to "Deluxe Music Construction Set" on the Amiga computer in 1984, and he experimented with composing. Gubman started to play the piano and compose music at the age of seven, and played in bands through high school. He joined marching bands and a show choir. He spent a lot of time playing videogames as well. In 1997, Gubman began attending the California State University at Long Beach. He took a break until 2003 when he resumed his studies, and completed a degree in Musical composition and Theory in 2006.

== Career ==
In 1994, Gubman released the album Sunday Rain under an independent record label. The album contained contributions from songwriter/producer Andy Dodd and singer Kevin Odekirk. Right after graduating from high school in 1997, Gubman worked for producer C. J. Vanston in Hollywood, and assisted on projects with Michael Bolton, Carole King, and the Christopher Guest's film "Best in Show".

Gubman was one of four producers on "This Is Me", by Justin Paul and Benj Pasek, from The Greatest Showman. The song was nominated for an Oscar and won a Golden Globe in 2017.

In January 2000, Gubman created a publishing company, "Gubman Music International", of which he remains the director in 2015. After a short time as a pop producer in the early 2000s, Gubman returned to University. During this period, he produced music for several indie artists, worked on a few indie movie scores, taught piano, and wrote his first musical, entitled "The Recital".

In 2006, after graduating from University, Gubman co-composed, along with composer Jeff Kurtenacker, the soundtrack for the videogame "Pirates of the Burning Sea", a massively multiplayer online role-playing game developed by Flying Lab Software and published by Sony Online Entertainment. Gubman then worked as a contract composer for "SomaTone Interactive Inc." and "Non-Stop Music". Since then, his work has been featured on hundreds of video games (of which many are published by well-known software houses), TV commercials, TV news packages, etc. Gubman's notable collaborations include singer Traci Hines, violinist Taylor Davis, composer Austin Wintory and the "Critical Hit band". As a contract composer, Gubman has written for NBC television broadcasts of the 2012 Winter Olympics, the 2012 Presidential Election and the 2011 Royal Wedding.

In 2013, under the direction of Warner/Chappell Music, Gubman composed a replacement for NBC's Today theme, which has been previously written by John Williams.

Currently, Gubman is a partner at Moonwalkaudio, a full-service audio pipeline management company. In early 2021, Gubman released the demos for an original animated musical he had written, known as ‘Seeds’.

== Awards ==
Year	Award	Work	Result
2005	"Stephen Paulus" Composition Award	"Fungi from Yuggoth" (based on the sonnets of H. P. Lovecraft)	Won
2006	"CSLUB" Composer of the Year	"Fungi from Yuggoth" (based on the sonnets of H. P. Lovecraft)	Won
2009	"AudioGANG" Composer's Challenge	Unknown	Won
2015	"AudioGANG" Best Game Music Cover/Remix Award	"The Last of Us Theme – violin cover" (with violinist Taylor Davis)	Nominated
