= The Greatest Showman =

2017 film by Michael Gracey

- Theatrical release poster
- Directed by: Michael Gracey
- Screenplay by: Jenny Bicks; Bill Condon
- Story by: Jenny Bicks
- Produced by: Laurence Mark; Peter Chernin; Jenno Topping
- Starring: Hugh Jackman; Zac Efron; Michelle Williams; Rebecca Ferguson; Zendaya
- Cinematography: Seamus McGarvey
- Edited by: Tom Cross; Robert Duffy; Joe Hutshing; Michael McCusker; Jon Poll; Spencer Susser
- Music by: John Debney and Joseph Trapanese (score); Pasek and Paul (songs)
- Production companies: Chernin Entertainment; Laurence Mark Productions
- Distributed by: 20th Century Fox
- Release dates: December 8, 2017 (RMS Queen Mary 2); December 20, 2017 (United States)
- Running time: 105 minutes
- Country: United States
- Language: English
- Budget: $84 million
- Box office: $472.1 million

The Greatest Showman is a 2017 American musical period drama film directed by Michael Gracey from a screenplay by Jenny Bicks and Bill Condon, based on an original story by Bicks. The film stars Hugh Jackman, Zac Efron, Michelle Williams, Rebecca Ferguson, and Zendaya. It features nine original songs written by Benj Pasek and Justin Paul and an original orchestral score composed by John Debney and Joseph Trapanese. The film is a heavily fictionalized depiction of the life of P. T. Barnum, the establishment of his circus, and the lives of its star performers.

The Greatest Showman premiered on December 8, 2017, aboard the RMS Queen Mary 2 in New York City and was released in the United States on December 20 by 20th Century Fox. The film received mixed reviews from critics, who praised the performances, music, visuals, and production values but criticized its artistic license and storytelling. It was a box-office success, grossing $472 million worldwide against an $84 million budget. The film received nominations for Best Motion Picture – Musical or Comedy and Best Actor – Musical or Comedy for Jackman at the 75th Golden Globe Awards. It won the Golden Globe Award for Best Original Song for "This Is Me", which was also nominated for Best Original Song at the 90th Academy Awards, and won Best Compilation Soundtrack for Visual Media at the 61st Annual Grammy Awards. A stage musical adaptation by the Disney Theatrical Group premiered at the Bristol Hippodrome in March 2026 and is scheduled to open at the Theatre Royal Drury Lane in spring 2027.

== Plot ==
In the 19th century, young P. T. Barnum and his tailor father, Philo, work for the wealthy Hallett family. Barnum falls in love with their daughter, Charity, and the two remain in contact while she attends finishing school. They reunite as adults ("A Million Dreams"), marry, and raise two daughters, Caroline and Helen, in New York City. Although Charity is content with their modest life, Barnum longs for success.

Barnum loses his job when the shipping company he works for goes bankrupt. He obtains a bank loan by deceptively using his former employer's lost ships as collateral and opens Barnum's American Museum in downtown Manhattan. When ticket sales remain slow, Caroline and Helen suggest that he exhibit something "alive". Barnum recruits performers with unusual physical characteristics and abilities, including bearded lady Lettie Lutz and Charles Stratton, a man with dwarfism ("Come Alive"). The show draws large audiences as well as protests and hostile reviews from critic James Gordon Bennett Sr. Barnum renames the venture "Barnum's Circus" and recruits playwright Phillip Carlyle to generate publicity ("The Other Side"). Phillip and African American trapeze artist Anne Wheeler become attracted to each other but hesitate to pursue a relationship because of racial prejudice. Phillip later arranges for Barnum and the troupe to meet Queen Victoria.

Barnum persuades Swedish singer Jenny Lind to undertake an American tour with him as her manager. Her debut is a success ("Never Enough"), bringing Barnum acceptance among elite patrons. As his status rises, he distances himself from the circus performers, who resolve to stand against their harassers ("This Is Me"). Phillip and Anne attempt to pursue their relationship, but Anne fears that society will never accept them ("Rewrite the Stars").

While Barnum accompanies Lind on tour, Charity becomes increasingly isolated from him ("Tightrope"). Lind develops romantic feelings for Barnum, but he rejects her advances. She ends the tour and kisses him publicly during her final performance; a photograph of the kiss subsequently appears in the press.

Barnum returns home to find the circus burning after a fight between protesters and the troupe. Phillip enters the building to rescue Anne, unaware that she has already escaped, and is seriously injured before Barnum rescues him from his circus who is destroyed. But the next day, Bennett later tells Barnum that those responsible for the fire have been caught. With Lind's tour cancelled and his mansion foreclosed, Barnum also loses Charity, who blames him for his obsessions, saying she never minded the risk, but they always did it together, and takes their daughters to her parents' home after learning of the kiss.

Distraught and heartbroken, Barnum retreats to a bar, where the troupe finds him and reminds him that they still consider themselves a family. Inspired, he resolves to rebuild the show and no longer allow ambition to control him ("From Now On"). Phillip recovers with Anne beside him, while Barnum reconciles with Charity.

Phillip offers his share of the profits to help rebuild the circus in exchange for becoming a full partner. To reduce costs, Barnum reopens the show as an open-air tent circus. After its successful return ("The Greatest Show"), Barnum makes Phillip the new ringmaster and leaves to spend more time with his family, arriving on an elephant to attend his daughters' ballet recital.

== Cast ==
- Hugh Jackman as P. T. Barnum, an ambitious showman and entrepreneur
  - Ellis Rubin as young Barnum
    - Ziv Zaifman provides young Barnum's singing voice
- Zac Efron as Phillip Carlyle, a playwright who becomes Barnum's partner
- Michelle Williams as Charity Hallett-Barnum, the wife of P. T. Barnum
  - Skylar Dunn as young Charity
- Rebecca Ferguson as Jenny Lind, a famous Swedish singer known as the "Swedish Nightingale"
  - Loren Allred provides Lind's singing voice
- Zendaya as Anne Wheeler, an acrobat, trapeze artist, and Phillip's love interest
- Austyn Johnson as Caroline Barnum, Barnum and Charity's older daughter, who takes up ballet
- Cameron Seely as Helen Barnum, Barnum and Charity's younger daughter
- Keala Settle as Lettie Lutz, a bearded lady
- Sam Humphrey as Charles Stratton, a dwarf performer known by his stage name "General Tom Thumb"
- Yahya Abdul-Mateen II as W. D. Wheeler, an acrobat and Anne's older brother
- Eric Anderson as Mr. O'Malley, a former pickpocket whom Barnum employs at his circus
- Natasha Liu Bordizzo as Deng Yan, a Chinese acrobat and blade specialist
- Paul Sparks as James Gordon Bennett, the founder, editor, and publisher of the New York Herald
- Fredric Lehne as Benjamin Hallett, Charity's father
- Gayle Rankin as Queen Victoria
- Byron Jennings as Mr. Carlyle, Phillip's father
- Betsy Aidem as Mrs. Carlyle, Phillip's mother
- Damian Young as Mr. Winthrop
- Tina Benko as Mrs. Winthrop
- Will Swenson as Philo Barnum, a tailor and P. T. Barnum's late father
- Radu Spinghel as Vasily "O'Clancy" Karpov, a stiltwalker and member of Barnum's troupe with the title "Irish Giant"
- Luciano Acuna Jr. as the Dog Boy, a man with hypertrichosis and member of Barnum's troupe
- Danial Son and Yusaku Komori as Chang and Eng Bunker, the Siamese Twins who are members of Barnum's troupe
- Nick Jantz as a juggler and member of Barnum's troupe
- Daniel Everidge as the Lord of Leeds, a 500 lb. fat man who is a member of Barnum's troupe
- Timothy Hughes as the strongman who is a member of Barnum's troupe
- Kenneth Wong Chan as the human cannonball who is a member of Barnum's troupe
- Jamie Jackson as the boss of Barnum's first job
- Shuler Hensley as the lead protester
- James Andrew O'Connor as a firefighter
- Adam Haas Hunter as a protestor
- Martha Nichols as the Woman in Gold, an African-American member of Barnum's troupe
- Jonathan Redavid as Dancer Oddity #1, a three-legged man and member of Barnum's troupe
- Shannon Holtzapffel as Dancer Oddity #2, a member of Barnum's troupe
- Jeremy Hudson as Dancer Oddity #3, an elephant-skinned man and member of Barnum's troupe
- Taylor James as Dancer Oddity #4, a human blockhead and member of Barnum's troupe
- Chelsea Caso as Dancer Oddity #5, a tattooed lady and member of Barnum's troupe
- Caoife Coleman and Mishay Petronelli as Dancer Oddities #6 and #7, two albino twins who are members of Barnum's troupe
- Khasan Brailsford as Ensemble Dancer #1, an African-American man in white clothes and white dreadlocks who is a member of Barnum's troupe
- Alex Wong as Ensemble Dancer #2, a Chinese man and member of Barnum's troupe
- Julius Rubio as Ensemble Dancer #3, a member of Barnum's troupe that wears gold clothes
- Vincent-Oliver Noiseux as Ensemble Dancer #4, a horned member of Barnum's troupe
- Sunny Walters and Ilia Jessica Castro as Ensemble Dancer #5 and #6, two African-American twins and members of Barnum's troupe
- Najla Gilliam as Ensemble Dancer #7, a snake charmer and member of Barnum's troupe
- Christina Glur as Ensemble Dancer #8, an Egyptian lady and member of Barnum's troupe
- James Babson: additional voices

Sandou Trio Russian Bar makes an uncredited background cameo during the revamped circus scene.

== Production ==
=== Development ===
During rehearsals for the 81st Academy Awards in 2009, producers Laurence Mark and Bill Condon compared host Jackman to Barnum. After Jackman expressed interest in a Barnum project, Mark and Condon approached Jenny Bicks, a writer for the ceremony. She and Condon wrote The Greatest Showman. The project was first announced in 2009 under the title The Greatest Showman on Earth, with Jackman already set for the title role. In August 2011, Michael Gracey was chosen to direct. In 2013, Fox hired songwriting team of Benj Pasek and Justin Paul to write the songs.

In early 2016, the cast performed a read-through in front of producers to green-light the film. Pasek and Paul approached Jeremy Jordan to sing the part of Carlyle, since Jordan recorded demos for the film in 2015. The day before the read-through, Jackman underwent nasal surgery and was ordered by his doctor not to sing. Pasek and Paul asked Jordan to also sing the part of Barnum, while Jackman acted out the scenes, to which Jordan agreed. While the cast performed "From Now On", Jackman disobeyed orders and began singing along with Jordan. This brought the read-through to an emotional end, which resulted in the film being greenlit.

On June 15, 2016, Zac Efron began negotiations to star in the film, and in July 2016, Michelle Williams was cast. The film's choreographer was Ashley Wallen, with Mathieu Leopold serving as circus coordinator and choreographer. Shannon Holtzapffel also served as a choreographer on the film.

=== Filming ===
The film took seven years to develop, and Jackman had 10 weeks of preparation before filming started. Rehearsals on the film began in October 2016 in New York City, and principal photography began on November 22, 2016.

=== Post-production ===
In December 2017, James Mangold, who had worked with Jackman on several projects (including 2017's Logan), reportedly had been brought in to serve as an executive producer during the film's post-production. In an interview, director Michael Gracey noted, "There were eight producers on this film, and it was amazing having one of them be a filmmaker."

== Music ==
=== Musical numbers ===
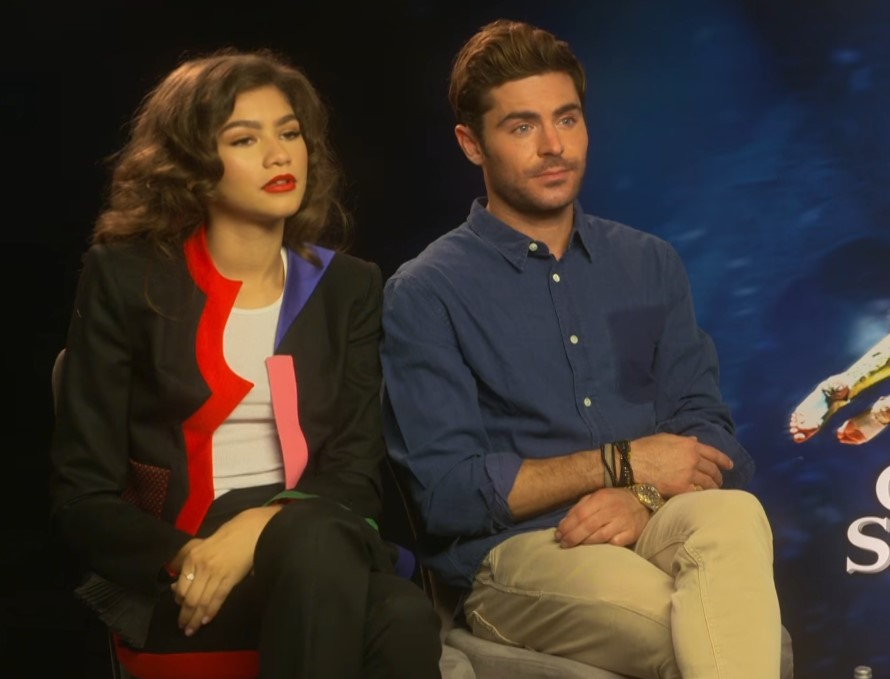
Zac Efron and Zendaya being interviewed regarding "Rewrite the Stars" and The Greatest Showman

Benj Pasek and Justin Paul wrote all the songs appearing in the film.

1. "The Greatest Show" – Hugh Jackman
2. "A Million Dreams" – Ziv Zaifman, Jackman, Michelle Williams
3. "A Million Dreams (Reprise)" – Austyn Johnson, Cameron Seely, Jackman
4. "Come Alive" – Jackman, Keala Settle, Daniel Everidge, Zendaya, The Greatest Showman Ensemble
5. "The Other Side" – Jackman, Zac Efron
6. "Never Enough" – Loren Allred
7. "This Is Me" – Settle, Ensemble
8. "Rewrite the Stars" – Efron, Zendaya
9. "Tightrope" – Williams
10. "Never Enough (Reprise)" – Allred
11. "Rewrite the Stars (Reprise)" – Zendaya
12. "From Now On" – Jackman, Ensemble
13. "From Now On / A Million Dreams (Reprise)" – Jackman, Williams
14. "The Greatest Show (Finale)" – Jackman, Efron, Settle, Zendaya, Ensemble

=== Soundtrack ===
The soundtrack album is produced by Justin Paul, Benj Pasek, Greg Wells, Kevin Weaver, and Pete Ganbarg, featuring the 11 tracks performed by the cast. In the United Kingdom, on March 23, 2018, it became only the second album in 30 years to achieve 11 consecutive weeks at number one, equaling the record set by Adele's 21. As of January 25, 2019, the album has spent the sixth-most time at number one at 28 non-consecutive weeks, matching the Beatles' Sgt. Pepper's Lonely Hearts Club Band.

=== The Greatest Showman: Reimagined ===
On November 16, 2018, a remix album was also released, The Greatest Showman: Reimagined, which features covers of songs from the soundtrack by musicians including James Arthur, Anne-Marie, Sara Bareilles, Kelly Clarkson, Kesha, Pink, Panic! at the Disco, Years & Years, Jess Glynne, Ty Dolla $ign, Missy Elliott, and Zac Brown Band, among others.

== Release ==
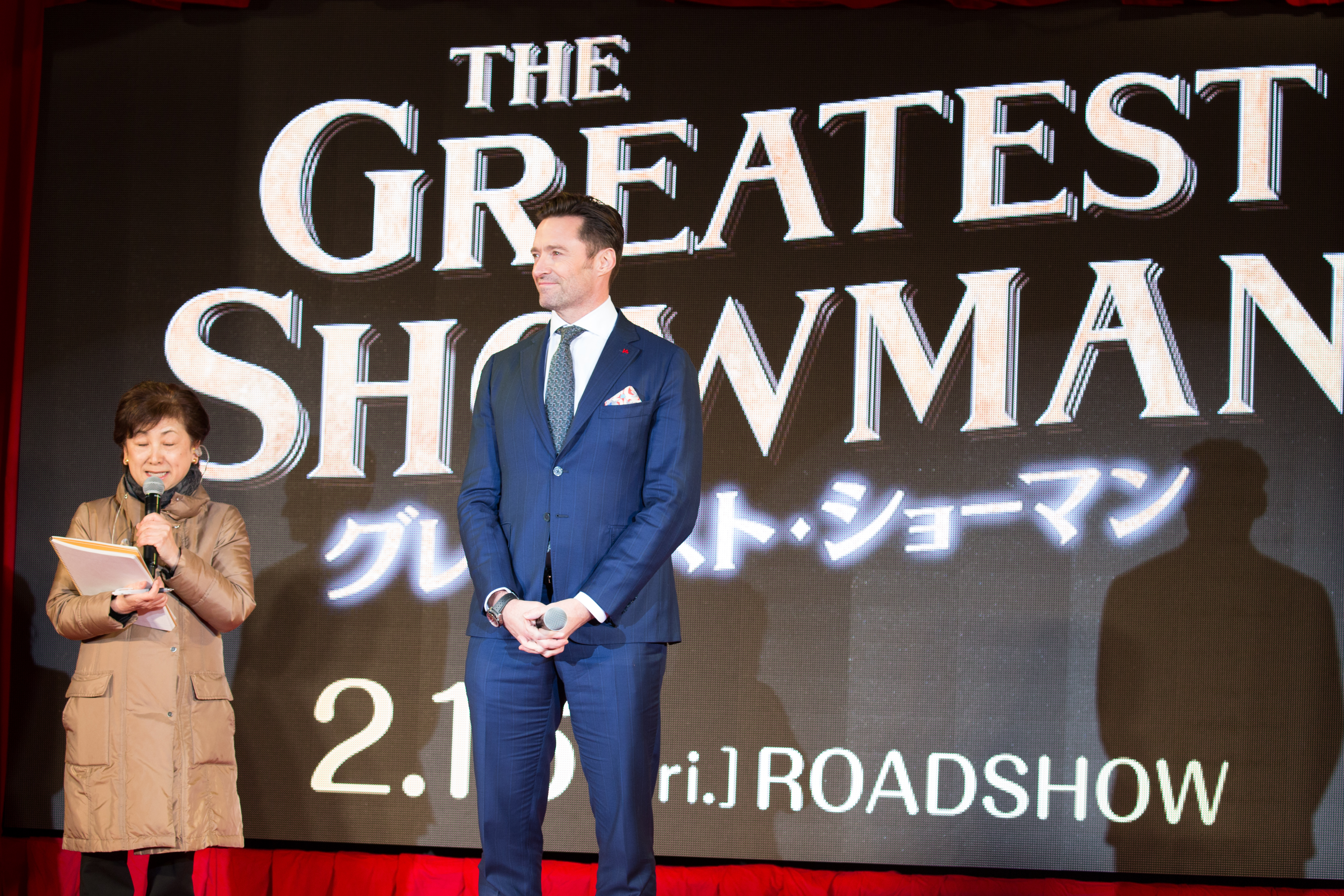
Hugh Jackman at the film's Japanese premiere on February 13, 2018

The Greatest Showman held its premiere on December 8, 2017, aboard RMS Queen Mary 2, while she was docked in New York City. The film was originally scheduled to be released on December 25, 2016, in the United States and Canada, but was moved to avoid competition with La La Land. The release date was pushed back a full year from its original release date of December 25, 2016, to December 25, 2017, before then being moved up by five days from December 25, 2017, to December 20, 2017.

As with Disney's live-action Beauty and the Beast, a sing-along version of the film was released in the United Kingdom on February 23, 2018. The film had a limited IMAX release on February 2, 2018.

=== Marketing ===
On June 28, 2017, 20th Century Fox released the first international trailer to promote the film. On November 13, 2017, the second trailer was released.

On December 17, 2017, Fox televised a live performance of "Come Alive" from Warner Bros. Studios during its live musical special A Christmas Story Live!. The number featured the film's stars and a cast of 150 dancers.

In 2018, Twentieth Century Fox Home Entertainment promoted the film with The Greatest Dance with Shannon Holtzapffel, a campaign listed at the Mumbrella Entertainment Marketing Awards.

=== Home media ===
In the United States, the film was released via digital download on March 20, 2018, and was released on DVD, Blu-ray, and 4K Ultra HD on April 10, 2018.

In the United Kingdom, the film was released first on digital download on April 27, 2018, while DVD, Blu-ray, and 4K Ultra HD copies went on sale on May 14, 2018. These versions included the sing-along version, two hours of behind-the-scenes footage, and music machine jukebox features.

In connection with the film's DVD and Blu-ray release, Dance Australia reported that Holtzapffel led a two-minute tutorial to "The Greatest Show". London Theatre later noted that a tutorial was also released to celebrate International Dance Day.

The Greatest Showman was released on the US and Canada version of Disney's streaming service Disney+ on August 14, 2020, following Disney's acquisition of 20th Century Fox in 2019.

== Reception ==
=== Box office ===
In its original release, The Greatest Showman grossed $174.3 million in the United States and Canada and $260.7 million in other territories, for a worldwide total of $435 million against a production budget of $84 million. It is the third-highest-grossing musical ever in North America and also the third-highest globally, and Deadline Hollywood estimated the film would turn a profit of $50–100 million.

In the United States and Canada, The Greatest Showman was released alongside Jumanji: Welcome to the Jungle, and was projected to gross around $21 million from 3,006 theaters over its first six days. It took in $2.5 million on its first day and $2.1 million on its second. Over the three-day weekend, it grossed $9 million (for a six-day total of $19 million), finishing fourth at the box office, behind Star Wars: The Last Jedi, Jumanji: Welcome to the Jungle and Pitch Perfect 3. In its second weekend, the film grossed $15.5 million, again finishing 4th at the box office. The weekend-to-weekend increase of 76.3% marked the largest ever for a film playing in over 3,000 theaters, and the fourth biggest ever. In its third week, the film dropped 11% to $14 million. The film made $13 million in its fourth weekend and $11 million in its fifth, finishing 4th and 5th at the box office, respectively. The film continued to hold well in its sixth week of release, grossing $9.5 million and returning to 4th place, and again finished fourth in its seventh week, this time grossing $7.8 million (a drop of just 18%). It is the 14th-highest-grossing film that never reached first place at the American box office.

=== Critical response ===
The film received mixed reviews from critics upon release. As reported by Entertainment Weekly, critics felt The Greatest Showman embraces the spectacle and showmanship of Barnum via vibrant musical numbers and lavish visuals, but its superficial approach to character development and historical nuance makes it more an extravagant diversion than a substantive biographical portrait. On review aggregator Rotten Tomatoes, 56% of 263 reviews are positive, and the average rating is 6/10. The website's critical consensus reads, "The Greatest Showman tries hard to dazzle the audience with a Barnum-style sense of wonder—but at the expense of its complex subject's far more intriguing real-life story." On Metacritic, the film has a weighted average score of 48 out of 100, based on reviews from 43 critics, indicating "mixed or average reviews". Audiences polled by CinemaScore gave the film an average grade of "A" on an A+ to F scale, while those at PostTrak gave it 4.5 out of 5 stars and a 70% "definite recommend".

Owen Gleiberman of Variety gave the film a positive review, writing, "The Greatest Showman is a concoction, the kind of film where all the pieces click into place, yet at an hour and 45 minutes it flies by, and the link it draws between P. T. Barnum and the spirit of today is more than hype." Richard Roeper of the Chicago Sun-Times gave the film 3 out of 4 stars, saying, "With all that corn and cheese and old-timey sentiment, The Greatest Showman ends up scoring some very timely social arguments. P. T. Barnum himself would have approved the dramatic sleight of hand." Steve Persall of Tampa Bay Times gave the film an 'A', and said, "The Greatest Showman is the feel-good movie the holiday season needs," while William Bibbiani of IGN gave The Greatest Showman a score of 7.9 out of 10, and called the film, "wildly entertaining".

Britton Peele of The Dallas Morning News said, "The story is interesting and the beats are well acted, but it's the musical numbers that make The Greatest Showman." Jackie K. Cooper of HuffPost gave the film a score of 10/10 and wrote, "You will be overwhelmed by the music and magic that explode on the screen. The film has a message that should resonate with today's world concerning acceptance and courage." Hugh Armitage of Digital Spy said, "The Greatest Showman is a broad and solid crowd-pleaser. An undemanding spectacle for all the family." Alan Jones of the Radio Times called it "A joyously uplifting potpourri of visual resplendence, stylish choreography and solid gold magic, one engineered to approximate the lavish spectacle the movie musical once offered."

Sheila O'Malley of RogerEbert.com gave it 3.5 out of 4, stating,"The Greatest Showman is an unabashed piece of pure entertainment punctuated by memorable songs." James Berardinelli of ReelViews gave the film 3 out of 4, and said, "The film has show-stopping well-choreographed numbers with catchy tunes," and Calvin Wilson of the St. Louis Post-Dispatch called the film "highly enjoyable."

Carl Kozlowski of Pasadena Weekly gave the film an 'A', calling it "Groundbreaking & grandly innovative." Sean P. Means of The Salt Lake Tribune gave The Greatest Showman 3.5 out of 4, stating, "A strong cast give emotional power to this romanticized, tune-filled biography." Manuela Lazic of Little White Lies gave it 4 out of 5, saying, "The Greatest Showman deserves to become a Christmas classic. The film's severe romanticism and ridiculous but affecting enthusiasm make it irresistibly life-affirming." Pete Hammond of Deadline Hollywood gave the film 4 out of 5 stars and called it, "A fantasia of song and dance, a joyous exercise in pure entertainment that is made for the holiday crowd."

Conversely, Mick LaSalle of the San Francisco Chronicle gave the film a negative review, criticizing the songs and characters, and saying, "There's idiotic, and there's magnificent, but The Greatest Showman is that special thing that happens sometimes. It's magnificently idiotic. It's an awful mess, but it's flashy. The temptation is to cover your face and watch it through your fingers because it's so earnest and embarrassing and misguided—and yet it's well made." In a negative review for The Hollywood Reporter, David Rooney wrote "This ersatz portrait of American big-top tent impresario P. T. Barnum is all smoke and mirrors, no substance. It hammers pedestrian themes of family, friendship and inclusivity while neglecting the fundaments of character and story."

Writing for Rolling Stone, Peter Travers gave the film 1.5 out of 4 stars, saying, "How do you cast a virtuoso Hugh Jackman as P. T. Barnum, spare no expense in production values, add a score by Oscar and Tony winners Benj Pasek and Justin Paul, and still end up with the shrill blast of nothing that is The Greatest Showman? Ask first-time director Michael Gracey, who cut his teeth on commercials and music videos without ever mastering the crucial knack of building snippets of musical comedy and drama into a satisfying whole." Justin Chang of the Los Angeles Times wrote that the film's failures "are rooted in something deeper: a dispiriting lack of faith in the audience's intelligence, and a dawning awareness of its own aesthetic hypocrisy. You've rarely seen a more straight-laced musical about the joys of letting your freak flag fly."

In February 2025, The Washington Post ranked the film at number 20 on its list of "The 25 best movie musicals of the 21st century," with Naveen Kumar writing "Songwriters Benj Pasek and Justin Paul ushered in an era of deeply affecting and earworm-y Broadway pop with their Tony-winning musical Dear Evan Hansen. Their score for this fictionalized biopic of circus mastermind P.T. Barnum is full of undeniable bops."

=== Historical revisionism ===
The Greatest Showman included many historical inaccuracies and omissions. Vanity Fair called it "a highly fictionalized musical biopic". The New Yorker said, "there's a sort of poetic injustice in the fact that 'The Greatest Showman,' the new musical... based on the life of P. T. Barnum, the long-famed 'Prince of Humbug,' should be largely fabricated out of synthetic cloth". The Smithsonian magazine published "P.T. Barnum isn't the hero the 'Greatest Showman' wants you to think", highlighting that "his path to fame and notoriety began by exploiting an enslaved woman, in life and in death, as entertainment for the masses". The Smithsonian refers to Barnum's first theatrical foray in 1835, where he exhibited an African-American slave woman named Joice Heth and claimed she had raised George Washington and was 161 years old, while she was actually in her late 70s. At the time, owning slaves in New York was illegal, but Barnum got around this by "renting" Heth. After she died in 1836, Barnum arranged a public autopsy of Heth, for which he charged admission. In her book Medical Apartheid: The Dark History of Medical Experimentation on Black Americans from Colonial Times to the Present, Harriet A. Washington included this as an example of the way African Americans were treated as subhuman in terms of medical procedures and testing. Another Barnum hoax was the Fiji mermaid which in reality was the body of a monkey and the tail of a fish stitched together. Barnum's shows were also notorious for the cruelty inflicted on the animals, which resulted in the death of at least two whales. Rhoda Roberts, arts director of the Sydney Opera House, criticized the film for not addressing that Barnum coerced and kidnapped native peoples to perform in human zoos as a form of entertainment.

In addition to leaving out many aspects of Barnum's career, the people and events depicted in the movie were heavily fictionalized. The two lead characters, Phillip Carlyle and Anne Wheeler, were completely fictional. The character of Jenny Lind is portrayed as a glamorous woman who becomes infatuated with Barnum and, when he does not respond to her overtures, quits the show. In her final performance, she lured Barnum out to the stage for a public kiss in an attempt to flame rumors about their romance. In reality, Lind dressed plainly and was known for her charitable donations both in her home country and to various charities in the United States. Neither Lind nor Barnum displayed any romantic interest in each other. Lind found Barnum to be crude, and Barnum was more interested in money than romance. Lind broke off her successful tour with Barnum early because she was unhappy with Barnum's marketing.

=== Accolades ===
Award	Date of ceremony	Category	Nominee(s)	Result	Ref.
AARP Movies for Grownups Awards	February 5, 2018	Best Grownup Love Story	The Greatest Showman	Won	
Academy Awards	March 4, 2018	Best Original Song	"This Is Me" – Benj Pasek and Justin Paul	Nominated	
American Music Awards	October 9, 2018	Favorite Soundtrack	The Greatest Showman	Nominated	
Billboard Music Awards	May 20, 2018	Top Soundtrack	The Greatest Showman: Original Motion Picture Soundtrack	Nominated	
Billboard Music Awards	May 1, 2019	Top Soundtrack	The Greatest Showman: Original Motion Picture Soundtrack	Won	
Casting Society of America	January 18, 2018	Big Budget – Comedy	Bernard Telsey, Tiffany Little Canfield, Rori Bergman and Patrick Goodwin	Won	
Chita Rivera Awards	May 20, 2018	Outstanding Choreography of a Theatrical Release	The Greatest Showman – Shannon Holtzapffel and Ashley Wallen	Won	
Costume Designers Guild	February 20, 2018	Excellence in Period Film	Ellen Mirojnick	Nominated	
Critics' Choice Movie Awards	January 11, 2018	Best Song	"This Is Me" – Benj Pasek and Justin Paul	Nominated	
Dorian Awards	February 24, 2018	Campy Flick of the Year	The Greatest Showman	Nominated	
Empire Awards	March 18, 2018	Best Costume Design	The Greatest Showman	Nominated	
Empire Awards	March 18, 2018	Best Make-up And Hairstyling	The Greatest Showman	Nominated	
Georgia Film Critics Association	January 12, 2018	Best Original Song	"This Is Me" – Benj Pasek and Justin Paul	Nominated	
Golden Globe Awards	January 7, 2018	Best Actor in a Motion Picture – Musical or Comedy	Hugh Jackman	Nominated	
Golden Globe Awards	January 7, 2018	Best Motion Picture – Musical or Comedy	The Greatest Showman	Nominated	
Golden Globe Awards	January 7, 2018	Best Original Song – Motion Picture	"This Is Me" – Benj Pasek and Justin Paul	Won	
Golden Reel Awards	February 18, 2018	Outstanding Achievement in Sound Editing – Musical	Jen Monnar, Jim Harrison, Jeff Carson, Peter Myles and Sheri Ozeki	Won	
Grammy Awards	February 10, 2019	Best Compilation Soundtrack for Visual Media	The Greatest Showman: Original Motion Picture Soundtrack	Won	
Grammy Awards	February 10, 2019	Best Song Written for Visual Media	"This Is Me" – Benj Pasek and Justin Paul	Nominated	
Guild of Music Supervisors Awards	February 8, 2018	Best Music Supervision for Film: Budgeted Over 25 Million Dollars	Benj Pasek and Justin Paul	Nominated	
Guild of Music Supervisors Awards	February 8, 2018	Best Song/Recording Created for a Film	"This Is Me" – Benj Pasek and Justin Paul	Nominated	
Heartland Film Festival	December 31, 2017	Truly Moving Picture Award	Michael Gracey	Won	
Kids' Choice Awards	March 24, 2018	Favorite Movie	The Greatest Showman	Nominated	
Kids' Choice Awards	March 24, 2018	Favorite Movie Actress	Zendaya (Note: Also for Spider-Man: Homecoming (2017))	Won	
Make-Up Artists and Hair Stylists Guild	February 24, 2018	Feature Motion Picture: Best Period and/or Character Makeup	Nicki Ledermann, Tania Ribalow and Sunday Englis	Nominated	
Saturn Awards	June 27, 2018	Best Action or Adventure Film	The Greatest Showman	Won	
Saturn Awards	June 27, 2018	Best Costume Design	Ellen Mirojnick	Nominated	
Saturn Awards	June 27, 2018	Best Music	John Debney and Joseph Trapanese	Nominated	
Teen Choice Awards	August 12, 2018	Choice Breakout Movie Star	Keala Settle	Nominated	
Teen Choice Awards	August 12, 2018	Choice Collaboration	"Rewrite the Stars" – Zac Efron and Zendaya	Won	
Teen Choice Awards	August 12, 2018	Choice Drama Movie	The Greatest Showman	Won	
Teen Choice Awards	August 12, 2018	Choice Drama Movie Actor	Zac Efron	Won	
Teen Choice Awards	August 12, 2018	Choice Drama Movie Actor	Hugh Jackman	Nominated	
Teen Choice Awards	August 12, 2018	Choice Drama Movie Actress	Zendaya	Won	
Teen Choice Awards	August 12, 2018	Choice Liplock	Zac Efron and Zendaya	Nominated	
Teen Choice Awards	August 12, 2018	Choice Movie Ship	Zac Efron and Zendaya	Won	
Teen Choice Awards	August 12, 2018	Choice Pop Song	"This Is Me" – Keala Settle	Nominated	

== Stage adaptations ==
=== The Greatest Showman ===
In August 2024, the Disney Theatrical Group announced at the D23 fan convention that a stage musical adaptation of the film was in development, making it the company's first stage adaptation of a 20th Century Fox film. The production was directed by Casey Nicholaw from a libretto by Tim Federle adapted from the film's screenplay. It includes all the songs from the film, in addition to five new songs written by Pasek and Paul.

On March 5, 2025, it was confirmed that the show would premiere in the Bristol Hippodrome in Spring 2026. In August 2026, Disney Theatrical Group announced that musical is scheduled to open in the spring of 2027 at Theatre Royal Drury Lane.

=== Come Alive! The Greatest Showman Circus Spectacular ===
Come Alive! The Greatest Showman Circus Spectacular is a theatre performance based on the film, integrating circus and musical theatre elements and described as a "circus spectacular". A run in London's West End began in 2024, and an Australian tour in 2026.

== Possible sequel ==
In September 2019, a sequel for the film was already in development, with Jackman confirmed to reprise his role. However, the sequel's future is now uncertain after Disney chose to end a distribution deal for Chernin Entertainment's films by 20th Century Fox in early 2020.

In September 2022, Jackman stated that he was still interested in a sequel being produced if both companies could come to an agreement.

== See also ==
- Barnum, a 1980 Broadway show with music by Cy Coleman
- The Greatest Show on Earth, a 1952 film directed by Cecil B. DeMille
