= Ben Joyce (actor) =

Welsh actor

Ben Joyce is a Welsh stage actor. He is best known for playing Frankie Valli in Jersey Boys (his West End debut) and Marty McFly in Back to the Future: The Musical.

== Early life and education ==
Joyce was born in Swansea and graduated from Mountview Academy of Theatre Arts.

== Career ==
Joyce made his professional debut in 2021 as Frankie Valli in Jersey Boys at the Trafalgar Theatre.

From 2022 until 2024 he starred as Marty McFly in Back to the Future: The Musical at the Adelphi Theatre, as part of the show's second and third year cast. In December 2025, Joyce returned to the show for one night only, sharing the stage with fellow McFly performer Olly Dobson and current performer Caden Brauch to celebrate the 40th anniversary of the film's UK release. Joyce has played Marty McFly for the most performances of the musical, in any production.

Joyce played Beau in the UK premiere of Shucked at the Regent's Park Open Air Theatre in 2025. In the cast Sophie McShera as Maizy, Georgina Onuorah as Lulu, Matthew Seadon-Young as Gordy and Steven Webb as Storyteller 2.

In August 2025, Joyce joined the cast of the concert of The Hunchback of Notre Dame in the role of Quasimodo, alongside Christine Allado as Esmeralda, Zachary James as Claude Frollo, Dex Lee as Captain Phoebus, and Adam Strong as Clopin.

In the same month the cast of the world premiere of The Greatest Showman, the musical was announced, with Joyce playing the role of Phillip Carlyle. He joined Oliver Tompsett as P.T. Barnum, Samantha Barks as Charity Barnum, Lorna Courtney as Anne Wheeler, Vajèn van den Bosch as Jenny Lind and Malinda Parris as Lettie Lutz. The show ran at the Bristol Hippodrome from 15 March to 20 May 2026.

The show's return was announced at the D23 Convention and is due to open in April 2027 at the Theatre Royal, Drury Lane, in London. Joyce will reprise his role as Philip Carlyle, with Oliver Thompsett returning as P.T. Barnum, Samantha Barks as Charity Barnum, Vajèn van den Bosch as Jenny Lind and Malinda Parris as Lettie Lutz.

== Credits ==
=== Stage ===
Year	Title	Role	Theatre	Category	Ref.
2021	Jersey Boys	Frankie Valli	Trafalgar Theatre	West End	
2022-2024	Back to the Future: The Musical	Marty McFly	Adelphi Theatre	West End	
2025	Shucked	Beau	Regent's Park Open Air Theatre	Off West End	
2025	The Hunchback of Notre Dame	Quasimodo	Prince Edward Theatre	West End	
2026	The Greatest Showman, the Musical	Phillip Carlyle	Bristol Hippodrome	Regional	
2027	The Greatest Showman, the Musical	Phillip Carlyle	Theatre Royal, Drury Lane	West End	

=== Television ===
Year	Title	Role	Notes
2023	The Power	Jonny	TV series (1 episode)

== Personal life ==
Joyce has been dating actress Amber Davies since 2022.

== Awards ==
Year	Work	Award	Category	Result	Ref.
2022	Jersey Boys	The Stage Debut Awards	Best Performer in a Musical	Nominated	
2022	Jersey Boys	The Stage Debut Awards	Best West End Debut	Nominated	
2023	Back to the Future: The Musical	WhatsOnStage Awards	Best Takeover Performance	Nominated	
