= Keala Settle =

British-American actress and singer

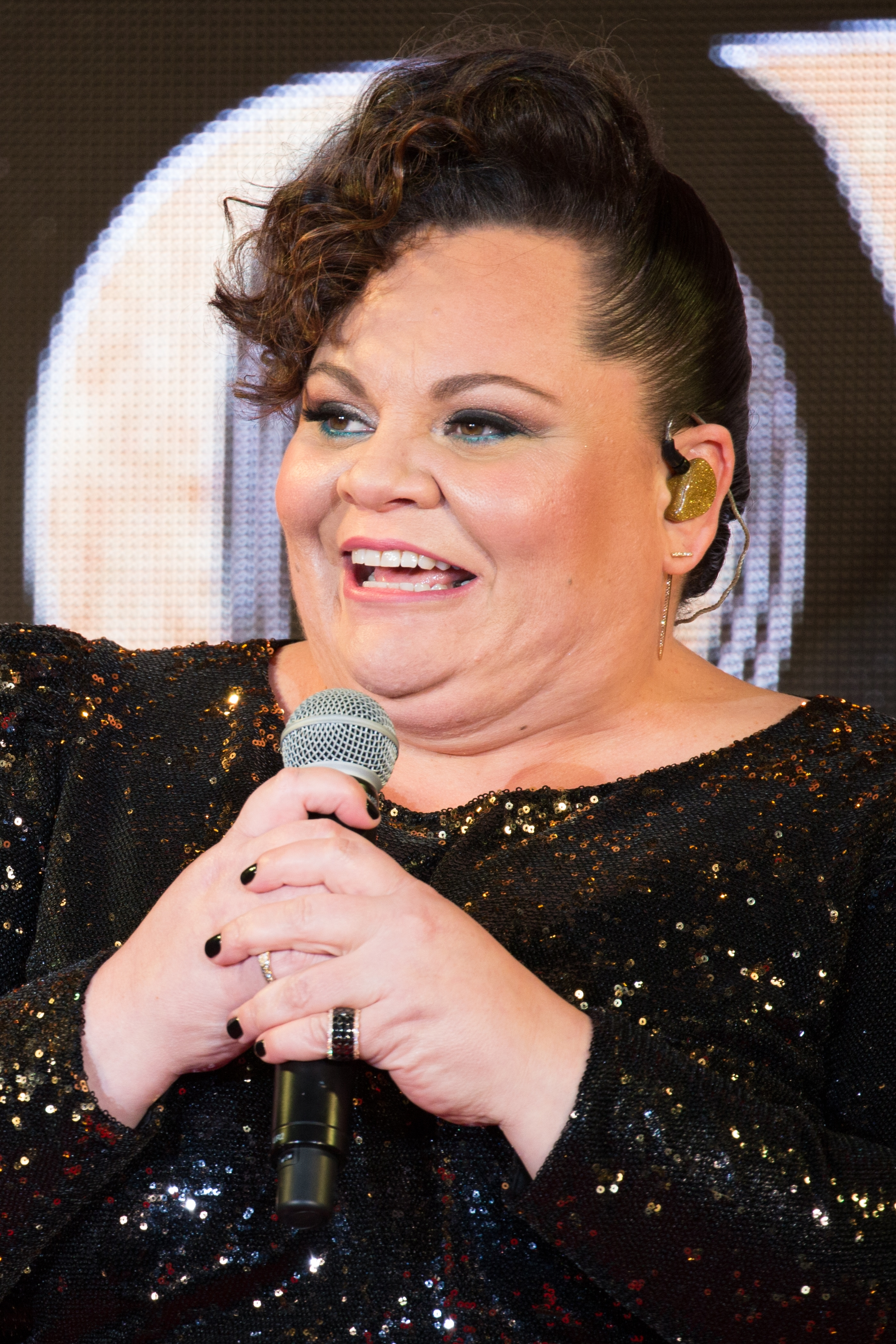
- Settle at The Greatest Showman premiere in Japan on 13 February 2018
- Occupations: Actress; singer
- Years active: 2002–present

Keala Settle is an American singer and actress of stage and screen. Settle originated the role of Norma Valverde in Hands on a Hardbody, which ran on Broadway in 2013, and was nominated for the Outer Critics Circle Award, Drama Desk Award, and Tony Award for Best Featured Actress in a Musical. In 2016, she was in the original Broadway cast of Waitress portraying Becky. In 2017, she portrayed Lettie Lutz, a bearded lady, in the musical film The Greatest Showman. The song "This Is Me" from the film, principally sung by Settle, won the 2017 Golden Globe Award for Best Original Song, and was nominated for the Academy Award for Best Original Song. She made her Broadway debut in 2011 in Priscilla, Queen of the Desert, and has appeared in national tours of Hairspray and South Pacific.

== Career ==
=== Broadway ===
Settle made her Broadway debut in 2011 in Priscilla, Queen of the Desert as Shirley and in the ensemble.

Settle originated the role of Norma Valverde in Hands on a Hardbody, a musical which ran briefly on Broadway in 2013, and is based on the 1997 documentary about real people competing to win a new truck. The TheatreMania reviewer wrote: "Settle, as Norma, steals every scene she's in. The spectacularly bizarre lead-in to her big number, 'Joy of the Lord,' is more difficult to pull off than most Shakespearean monologues, and her solo vocals reveal a soulful, oversized gospel range that drives the Holy Spirit straight to the back of the theater. When she tearfully realizes what her faith in God may have wrought, it stings like a chigger bite. Settle's touching performance should go on the shortlist for every Best Featured Actress prize in town." For this role, Settle was nominated for the Outer Critics Circle, Drama Desk, and Tony Award for Best Featured Actress in a Musical. Additionally, she was awarded the Theatre World Award for Outstanding Broadway or Off-Broadway debut performance during the 2012-13 theatrical season.

Settle played the role of Madame Thenardier in the revival of Les Misérables, starting in March 2014, and ending on March 1, 2015.

Settle originated the role of Becky in the musical Waitress, which opened on Broadway on April 24, 2016, at the Brooks Atkinson Theatre after premiering at the American Repertory Theater in August 2015.

=== Other work ===
Settle played the role of Tracy Turnblad in the national tour of Hairspray. In the review of the tour stop at the Kennedy Center in 2005, the Washington Post reviewer wrote: "As for Settle, she is a fine Tracy, even if she looks too old for graduate school, let alone high school." She appeared in the national tour of the Lincoln Center production of South Pacific as Bloody Mary, starting in 2009. The reviewer for the Pioneer Press, Massachusetts, wrote: "Better cast is Keala Settle, who plays the conniving Tonkinese trader lady Bloody Mary with a rolling gait, the venom of viper and—buried deeply but achingly visible in strategic moments—the maternal fierceness of a lioness."

In November through December 2012, Settle played the role of Mrs. Fezziwig in the Pioneer Theatre Company (Salt Lake City) production of the musical A Christmas Carol.

She played the role of the Narrator in Joseph and the Amazing Technicolor Dreamcoat at the Ogunquit Playhouse, Ogunquit, Maine from July 31 to August 25, 2013.

Settle performed in the Encores! concert staging of Violet on July 17, 2013, with Sutton Foster, but did not move on to the Broadway revival due to taking the role of Madame Thénardier in the revival of Les Misérables; she was replaced in Violet by Annie Golden.

Settle discussed her career path, noting that "I really am not a musical theatre performer. I'm more an R&B singer and have been doing that my whole life. My mother is—well, was—also an R&B singer, in New Zealand....I was too busy wanting to sing backup or doing studio work singing chorus stuff, and singing backup for Gladys Knight in Vegas." Further, after her run in Hairspray, she stated that she "didn't know how to live in that world..." and so for several years worked backstage with designers until she was cast in South Pacific.

In 2017, Settle portrayed Lettie Lutz, a bearded lady, in the biographical musical drama film The Greatest Showman, alongside Hugh Jackman, Zac Efron, and Zendaya. The song "This Is Me" from the film, principally sung by Settle, won the 2018 Golden Globe Award for Best Original Song and was nominated for the Academy Award for Best Original Song. On December 22, 2017, she released an extended play entitled Chapter One.

In 2018, she was featured in Forbidden, the newest Todrick Hall visual album, especially in the song called "Forbidden", a song against homophobia.

In 2019, Settle played the role of Cy (a gender-flipped version of Paul from the original, also combined with soloist 1) in Fox's Rent: Live.

Also in 2019, Settle toured with Hugh Jackman during his The Man. The Music. The Show. concerts globally, performing the song "This Is Me" from The Greatest Showman. On this tour Settle performed her original song Harder to a live audience for the very first time.

She performed "This Is Me" at the 2021 Royal Variety Performance. In January 2022, it was announced that Settle would make her West End debut performing the role of Angelique/Nurse in the musical & Juliet for a three-month run from March 29 to June 18, 2022.

In 2022, Keala Settle sang "How Many Sleeps 'till Christmas" for the Numberblocks.

Settle made her pantomime debut in 2022, playing the role of Fairy Sugarsnap in Jack and the Beanstalk at the Royal Derngate Theatre, Northampton.

In 2022, it was announced that Settle will play the role of Miss Coddle in the movie adaptation of the musical Wicked. Directed by Jon M. Chu, the movie includes stars such as Cynthia Erivo, Ariana Grande-Butera, Jonathan Bailey, Michelle Yeoh, Jeff Goldblum and Ethan Slater, as well as feature the voice of Peter Dinklage as Doctor Dillamond.

In February 2024, Settle participated in the fifth series of The Masked Singer UK as the character "Air Fryer". She was eliminated and unmasked in the semi final, taking fifth place.

On June 19, 2024, Settle returned to the role of Angèlique in & Juliet at the Sydney Lyric Theatre, after Casey Donovan left the cast to star as Deloris Van Cartier in the Sister Act musical.

== Filmography ==
=== Film ===
Year	Title	Role	Notes	Ref.
2015	Ricki and the Flash	Sharon		
2017	The Greatest Showman	Lettie Lutz		
2020	All My Life	Viv Lawrence		
2022	American Reject	Holly		
2024	This Time Next Year	Bev		
2024	Wicked	Miss Coddle		
2025	Wicked: For Good	Miss Coddle		

=== Television ===
Year	Title	Role	Notes	Ref.
2019	Rent: Live	Cy, Homeless Person, Vendor, Roger's Mother	Television special	
2021	Big Shot	Christina Winters	Recurring role; 4 episodes	
2021–2022	Central Park	Young Bitsy (voice)	2 episodes	
2022	Murder in Provence	Hélène Paulik		
2022	The Queen's Platinum Jubilee Celebration	Guest Presenter & Performer		
2024	The Masked Singer (UK)	Air Fryer	Contestant on series 5	

=== Theatre ===
Year	Production	Role	Location	Ref.
2003–2006	Hairspray	Tracy Turnblad	US Touring Production	
2009–2011	South Pacific	Bloody Mary	US Touring Production	
2010	Priscilla, Queen of the Desert	Shirley	Pre-Broadway Try-out	
2011–2012	Priscilla, Queen of the Desert	Shirley	Broadway	
2013	Hands on a Hardbody	Norma Valverde	Broadway	
2013	Violet	Old Lady/Hotel Hooker	Encores!	
2013	Joseph and the Amazing Technicolor Dreamcoat	Narrator	Ogunquit Playhouse	
2014–2015	Les Misérables	Madame Thénardier	Broadway	
2014	Waitress	Becky	Workshop	
2015	Waitress	Becky	American Repertory Theatre World Premiere	
2016	Waitress	Becky	Broadway	
2017	Jesus Christ Superstar	Peter	All-Female Concert Production	
2022	Gypsy	Rose Hovick	Alexandra Palace Theatre	
2022	& Juliet	Angelique/Nurse	West End, Manchester	
2022	Sister Act	Sister Mary Patrick	West End, Manchester	
2024	& Juliet	Angelique/Nurse	Sydney, Australia	
2024	Fly More Than You Fall	Jennifer	Off-West End	
2025	Urinetown	Penelope Pennywise	Encores!	
2025	Dracapella	Lucy	Park Theatre (London)	

=== Video games ===
Year	Title	Role	Ref.
2023	Forspoken	Johedy	

== Discography ==
=== Soundtrack albums ===
List of albums, with selected chart positions and certifications
Title	Album details	Peak chart positions										Certifications
Title	Album details	US	US Soundtracks	US Cast Album	CAN	GER	IRL	JAP	NZ	KOR	UK	Certifications
Priscilla, Queen of the Desert (Original Broadway Cast Recording)	Released: April 5, 2011; Label: Rhino Records; Format: CD, Digital download	-	1	-	-	-	-	-	-	-	-	
Hands on a Hardbody (Original Broadway Cast Recording)	Released: August 27, 2013; Label: Ghostlight Records; Format: CD, Digital download	-	3	-	-	-	-	-	-	-	-	
Waitress (Original Broadway Cast Recording)	Released: June 3, 2016; Label: DMI Soundtracks; Format: CD, Digital download	81	2	-	-	-	-	-	-	-	-	
From Broadway With Love: A Benefit Concert For Orlando	Released: December 16, 2016; Label: Broadway Records; Format: CD/DVD, Digital download	-	-	-	-	-	-	-	-	-	-	
The Greatest Showman: Original Motion Picture Soundtrack	Released: December 8, 2017; Label: Atlantic Records; Format: CD, Digital download, LP	1	-	1	3	5	1	1	1	17	1	RIAA: 2× Platinum; BPI: 10× Platinum; ARIA: Platinum; MC: Platinum; IFPI DEN: Platinum; RIAJ: Gold; RMNZ: Platinum
The Greatest Showman: Reimagined	Released: November 18, 2018; Label: Atlantic Records; Format: CD, Digital download	3	-	4	12	47	-	-	5	-	-	BPI: Gold
Rent (Original Soundtrack of the Fox Television Event)	Released: November 18, 2018; Label: Sony Music Entertainment; Format: CD, Digital download	-	-	-	-	-	-	-	-	-	-	

=== Extended plays ===
List of extended plays, showing title, date released, labels and track listing
Title	Album details	Track listing
Chapter One	Released: 22 December 2017; Label: NoiseWells; Format: digital download	1. "Til I Get to You"; 2. "Neither One of Us"; 3. "Tennessee Whiskey"; 4. "Can't Run Away"; 5. "The Rose"

=== Singles ===
List of singles, with selected chart positions and certifications, showing year released and album name
Title	Year	Peak chart positions										Certifications	Album
Title	Year	US	AUS	CAN	FRA	GER	IRL	JAP	NZ	KOR	UK	Certifications	Album
"This Is Me" (with The Greatest Showman Ensemble)	2017	58	10	74	52	55	11	17	13	9	3	RIAA: 2× Platinum; ARIA: 3× Platinum; RMNZ: Gold; BPI: 5× Platinum; MC: Platinum	The Greatest Showman: Original Motion Picture Soundtrack
"Bird Set Free"	2018	—											Non-album singles
"Harder"	2019	—											Non-album singles

=== Other charted songs ===
List of songs, with selected chart positions, showing year released and album name
Title	Year	Peak chart positions						Certifications	Album
Title	Year	US	AUS	IRE	FRA	NZ	UK	Certifications	Album
"The Greatest Show" (with Zac Efron, Hugh Jackman, Zendaya and The Greatest Showman Ensemble)	2017	88	42	34	110	— (Note: "The Greatest Show" did not enter the NZ Top 40 Singles Chart, but peaked at number 3 on the NZ Heatseeker Singles Chart.)	20	RIAA: Platinum; ARIA: 2× Platinum; BPI: 3× Platinum	The Greatest Showman: Original Motion Picture Soundtrack
"Come Alive" (with Hugh Jackman, Zendaya and Daniel Everidge)	2017	— (Note: "Come Alive" did not enter the Billboard Hot 100, but peaked at No. 21 on the Bubbling Under Hot 100 Singles chart.)	—	70	—	— (Note: "Come Alive" did not enter the NZ Top 40 Singles Chart, but peaked at number 8 on the NZ Heatseeker Singles Chart.)	55	BPI: Platinum; RIAA: Gold	The Greatest Showman: Original Motion Picture Soundtrack
