= Rewrite the Stars =

Zac Efron and Zendaya song for the 2017 film The Greatest Showman

Single by Zac Efron and Zendaya

from the album The Greatest Showman
- Released: July 20, 2018
- Genre: Pop; Show tune
- Length: 3:37
- Label: Atlantic
- Songwriter: Benj Pasek and Justin Paul
- Producers: Greg Wells; Joseph Trapanese; Justin Paul; Alex Lacamoire

Zac Efron singles chronology
"Right Here, Right Now" (2008)	"Rewrite the Stars" (2018)

Zendaya singles chronology
"Something New" (2016)	"Rewrite the Stars" (2017)	"All for Us" (2019)

Audio
- "Rewrite the Stars" on YouTube

"Rewrite the Stars" is a song performed by Zac Efron and Zendaya for the film The Greatest Showman (2017). It was released on November 17, 2017, by Atlantic Records as a promotional single from the soundtrack. In Australia, "Rewrite the Stars" was released to radio on July 20, 2018. The song sees Efron's character, Phillip Carlyle—a privileged white man and Barnum's protégé—serenading Zendaya's character, Anne Wheeler. Their passionate connection is fraught with societal obstacles, including racial prejudice and class distinctions. Philip tries to convince Anne that their love can overcome these barriers, challenging fate and destiny to create a future together.

The song appears in the 2026 stage musical adaptation of the film.

== Composition ==
According to sheet music published at Sheetmusicdirect.com, "Rewrite the Stars" is a moderately fast tempo of 125 beats per minute. Written in common time, the song is in the key of B♭ major. Throughout the track, Efron's vocal range spans from the low note of E♭_{3} to the high note of B♭_{4}, and Zendaya's vocal range spans from the low note of E♭_{3} to the high note of E♭_{5}. "Rewrite the Stars" had many melodic inspirations, most notably being "Unconditionally" by Katy Perry, produced by Dr. Luke, Max Martin, and Cirkut.

== Reception ==
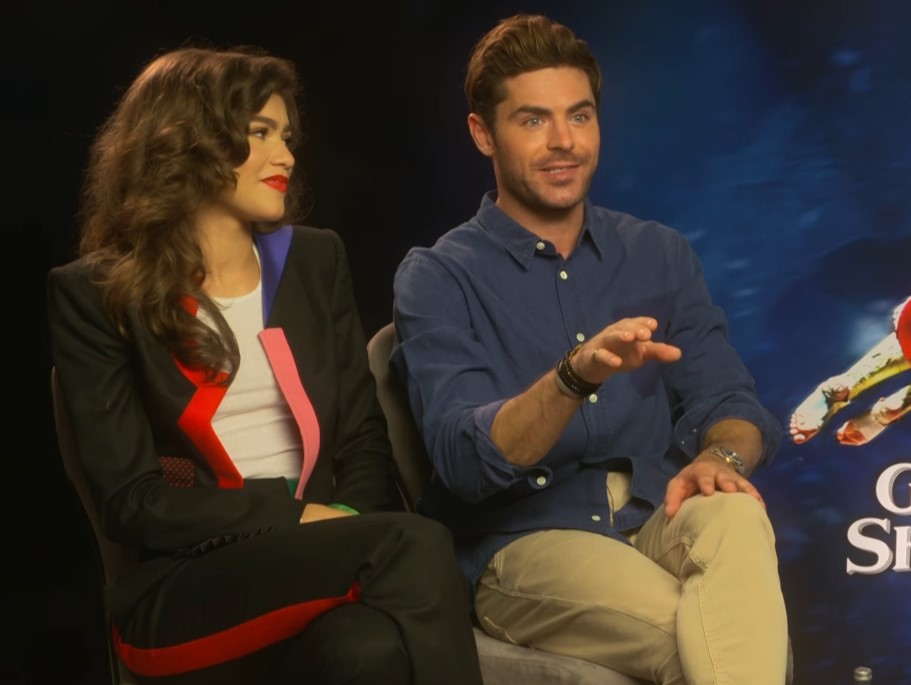
Zac Efron and Zendaya in an interview discussing "Rewrite the Stars" and The Greatest Showman

Sam Damshenas from GayTimes called the song a "stunning duet" with perfectly fitting romance, and Michael Ordoña from the Los Angeles Times called the song "a standout duet" and "a signature karaoke duet". However, Emily Yoshida from Vulture described the song as a "Jason Derulo castoff circa 2012."

== Accolades ==
Award	Date	Category	Result	Ref.
Teen Choice Awards	August 12, 2018	Choice Music: Collaboration	Won	

== Charts ==
=== Weekly charts ===
Chart (2017–2018)	Peak position
Australia (ARIA)	24
Austria (Ö3 Austria Top 40)	52
Belgium (Ultratip Bubbling Under Flanders)	12
Canada (Canadian Hot 100)	71
Finland (Suomen virallinen lista)	14
France (SNEP)	115
Germany (GfK)	89
Ireland (IRMA)	21
Japan Hot 100 (Billboard)	73
Malaysia (RIM)	3
Netherlands (Single Top 100)	53
New Zealand (Recorded Music NZ)	32
Portugal (AFP)	56
Singapore (RIAS)	1
Spain (Promusicae)	82
Sweden (Sverigetopplistan)	90
Switzerland (Schweizer Hitparade)	96
UK Singles (Official Charts)	16
US Billboard Hot 100	70

=== Year-end charts ===
Chart (2018)	Position
Australia (ARIA)	82
UK Singles (Official Charts Company)	32

== Certifications ==
Region	Certification	Certified units/sales
Australia (ARIA)	2× Platinum	140,000^{‡}
Austria (IFPI Austria)	Gold	15,000^{‡}
Canada (Music Canada)	3× Platinum	240,000^{‡}
Denmark (IFPI Danmark)	Platinum	90,000^{‡}
France (SNEP)	Gold	100,000^{‡}
Italy (FIMI)	Gold	35,000^{‡}
New Zealand (RMNZ)	3× Platinum	90,000^{‡}
Poland (ZPAV)	Platinum	50,000^{‡}
Portugal (AFP)	Platinum	10,000^{‡}
Spain (Promusicae)	Platinum	60,000^{‡}
United Kingdom (BPI)	3× Platinum	1,800,000^{‡}
United States (RIAA)	3× Platinum	3,000,000^{‡}
Streaming
Japan (RIAJ)	Gold	50,000,000^{†}
^{‡} Sales+streaming figures based on certification alone.^{†} Streaming-only figures based on certification alone.

== Release history ==
Region	Date	Format(s)	Label(s)	Version	Ref.
Various	November 17, 2017	Digital download; streaming	Atlantic	Promotional single	
Australia	July 20, 2018	Contemporary hit radio	Atlantic	Radio single	

== Reimagined version ==
"Rewrite the Stars"

Single by Anne-Marie and James Arthur

from the album The Greatest Showman: Reimagined
- Released: November 16, 2018
- Genre: Pop
- Label: Atlantic
- Songwriter: Pasek and Paul
- Producers: Greg Wells; Joseph Trapanese; Justin Paul; Alex Lacamoire

Anne-Marie singles chronology
"Perfect to Me" (2018)	"Rewrite the Stars" (2018)	"Fuck, I'm Lonely" (2019)

James Arthur singles chronology
"Empty Space" (2018)	"Rewrite the Stars" (2018)	"The Power of Love" (2018)

Music video
- "Rewrite the Stars (Reimagined version") on YouTube

On November 16, 2018, The Greatest Showman: Reimagined was released, which features a cover of "Rewrite the Stars" by English singers James Arthur and Anne-Marie as a single. The pair performed the song on the fifteenth season of British The X Factor on December 1 and the fifteenth season of American The Voice on December 4. It was released to Australian radio, and a remix by Wideboys was released on December 14.

=== Track listing ===
- Remix
1. "Rewrite the Stars" (Wideboys Hands in the Air remix) – 3:36

=== Charts ===
Chart (2018–19)	Peak position
Australia (ARIA)	67
Belgium (Ultratop 50 Flanders)	7
Belgium (Ultratop 50 Wallonia)	19
Canada Hot 100 (Billboard)	85
Germany (GfK)	100
Greece International Digital Singles (IFPI)	99
Hungary (Single Top 40)	27
Ireland (IRMA)	12
Netherlands (Dutch Top 40)	10
Netherlands (Single Top 100)	24
New Zealand Hot Singles (RMNZ)	5
Portugal (AFP)	61
Portugal Airplay (AFP)	1
Romania (Airplay 100)	12
Scottish Singles Sales (Official Charts)	4
Singapore (RIAS)	15
Slovakia Singles Digital (ČNS IFPI)	79
Sweden (Sverigetopplistan)	27
Switzerland (Schweizer Hitparade)	44
UK Singles (Official Charts)	7
US Bubbling Under Hot 100 (Billboard)	24

Chart (2024)	Peak position
Indonesia (Billboard)	13
Malaysia International (RIM)	20

=== Year-end charts ===
Chart (2019)	Position
Belgium (Ultratop Flanders)	37
Belgium (Ultratop Wallonia)	87
Netherlands (Dutch Top 40)	74
Portugal (AFP)	118
Romania (Airplay 100)	31

=== Certifications ===
Region	Certification	Certified units/sales
Denmark (IFPI Danmark)	Gold	45,000^{‡}
Italy (FIMI)	Gold	35,000^{‡}
New Zealand (RMNZ)	Platinum	30,000^{‡}
Norway (IFPI Norway)	Platinum	60,000^{‡}
Poland (ZPAV)	Gold	25,000^{‡}
Portugal (AFP)	Platinum	10,000^{‡}
Spain (Promusicae)	Gold	30,000^{‡}
United Kingdom (BPI)	2× Platinum	1,200,000^{‡}
United States (RIAA)	Gold	500,000^{‡}
^{‡} Sales+streaming figures based on certification alone.
