= Loren Allred =

American singer (born 1989)

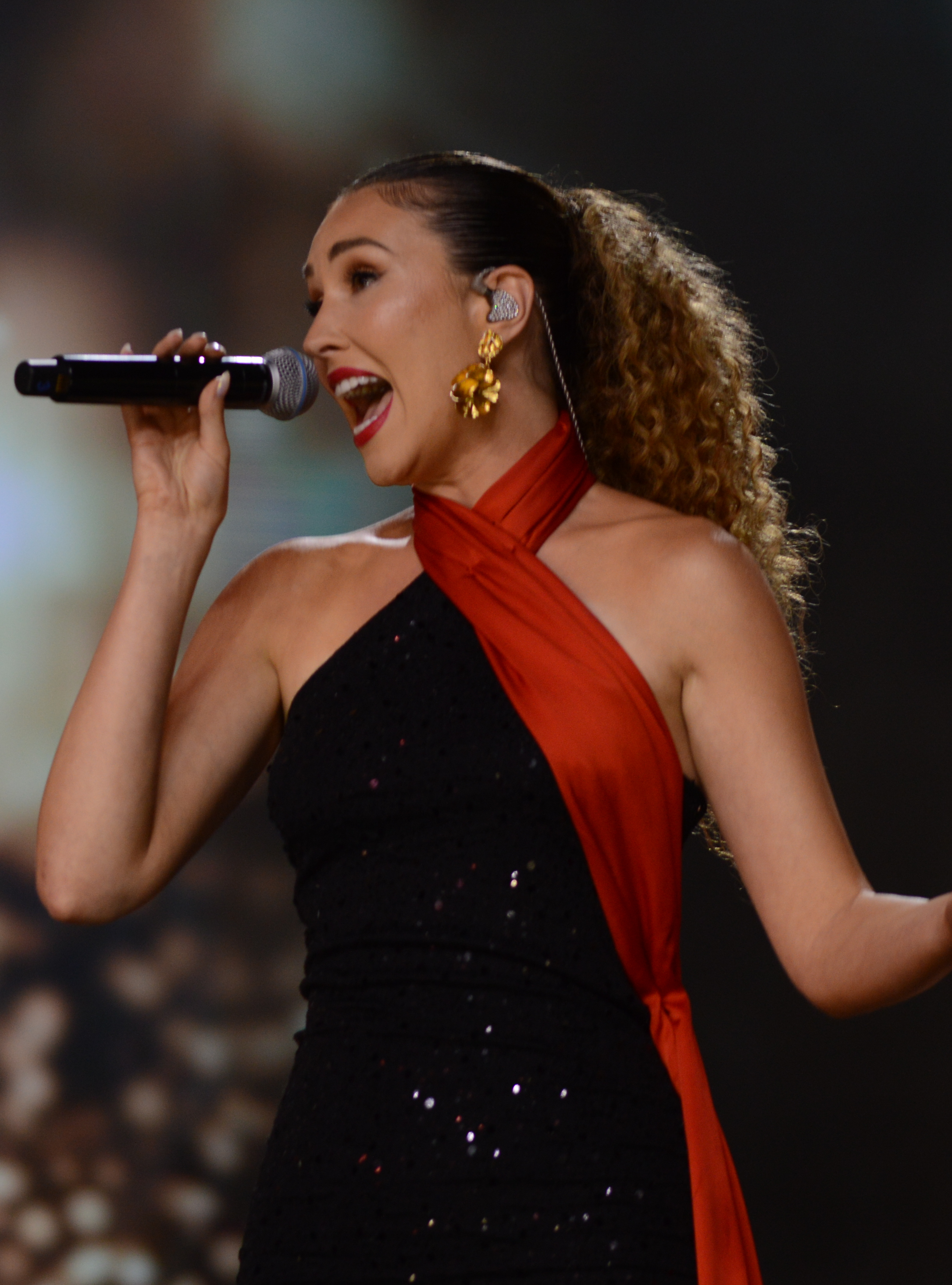
- Loren Allred, performing in Sopot, August 2022

Background information
- Born: September 7, 1989 (age 37); Pittsburgh, Pennsylvania, U.S.
- Occupation: Singer
- Years active: 2008–present
- Website: lorenallred.com

Loren Rachel Allred (born September 7, 1989) is an American singer. She made her Billboard Hot 100 debut with the RIAA-certified platinum-selling "Never Enough" from The Greatest Showman musical. She is featured on Michael Bublé's Love album in a duet of "Help Me Make It Through the Night," and alongside David Foster as part of his An Intimate Evening PBS concert special and album. Her debut EP Late Bloomer was released on September 24, 2021.

== Early life and education ==
Allred is the eldest daughter of musician parents. Her mother, Carol Ann Allred, is a classical soprano and voice teacher; her father, Brady R. Allred, was formerly the director of the Pittsburgh Bach Choir and an artistic director and conductor of the Salt Lake Choral Artists. She has three younger sisters, Megan, Brennan, and Karin.

After a year of studying musical theater at Weber State University in Ogden, Utah, she transferred to the Berklee College of Music in Boston. While there she uploaded videos to YouTube. She was discovered and championed by Ne-Yo leading to a record deal with Island Def Jam.

== Career ==
=== The Voice USA ===
In 2012, Allred was a contestant on season 3 of the American television show The Voice and selected Adam Levine as her coach. She was eliminated after the first week of the live playoffs, tying for 13th place.

Stage	Song	Original Artist	Date	Order	Result
Blind Audition	"When Love Takes Over"	David Guetta ft. Kelly Rowland	Sept. 12, 2012	3.10	Two chairs turned, joined Team Adam
Battles (Top 64)	"Need You Now" (vs Brian Scartocci)	Lady Antebellum	Oct. 22, 2012	14.3	Saved by Coach
Knockouts	"You Know I'm No Good" (vs Nicole Nelson)	Amy Winehouse	Oct. 29, 2012	16.4	Saved by Coach
Live Playoffs	"All Around the World"	Lisa Stansfield	Nov. 5, 2012	18.9	Eliminated

=== The Greatest Showman ===
In 2014, she worked as a playback singer and member of the recording ensemble for a film musical being developed by the Broadway songwriting team of Benj Pasek and Justin Paul. After working on early demos, she was cast as the singing voice of Rebecca Ferguson's character, Jenny Lind, on the project The Greatest Showman. The film's soundtrack became the top selling album of 2018, and the song went on to achieve double platinum status in the US, UK, and Canada. In the same month, "Never Enough" (Allred's featured song) reached number 88 on the Hot 100.

Allred's vocal performance of "Never Enough" has received widespread acclaim. Variety said her "incandescent" performance "will sweep you up"; Just Jared called it "Next Level". American Idol alum Kelly Clarkson recorded a cover for the album The Greatest Showman: Reimagined and praised Allred on Twitter for her performance of the song. Other notable artists who have since covered the song include Jennifer Hudson, Nicole Scherzinger, Katharine McPhee, Maria Simorangkir, Jona Viray, and Morissette. In early 2019, Allred joined Michael Bublé's Love album for a duet of "Help Me Make it Through the Night." Bublé discovered Allred while watching The Greatest Showman and released a behind the scenes recording of their duet. Bublé noted that Allred has "the most beautiful voice and control".

=== Andrea Bocelli USA tour ===
Allred joined Andrea Bocelli for selected performances on his 2021 USA Tour. While promoting the tour, Bocelli said, "If an artist wants to move the listener, he or she must have something intense and convincing to tell through the singing. This something comes from experiences and insight: it is the inner wealth that you can acquire by living. Loren Allred is a perfect example of this: her richly nuanced voice, her expressiveness, and her powers of communication describe and celebrate the beauty she has managed to cultivate within herself. A versatile musician raised in the arts, I remember how pleasantly surprised I was when we sang together for the first time in Saudi Arabia. I am delighted to soon be able to return to the stage with Loren, in that great country that is her homeland and my adoptive homeland."

=== Britain's Got Talent ===
In 2022, Allred auditioned for the 15th series of Britain's Got Talent, performing "Never Enough". Simon Cowell said "You sang one of the biggest songs of all time. Why didn't you get that big deal after the song?" She responded:

"I was more comfortable singing behind the scenes. But I feel kind of like the song was meant for me, and I'm kind of ready to put a face to the song... I'm here to do that."

She received a Golden Buzzer from Amanda Holden, sending her through to the semifinals. Allred advanced in the semifinal on June 2 and competed in the final, but she failed to secure a spot in the final 3. She finished in ninth place overall

Stage	Song	Original Artist	Date	Episode	Result
Audition	"Never Enough"	Loren Allred	April 16, 2022	1	Advanced Direct to Semi Finals (Amanda Holden's Golden Buzzer)
Semi Finals	"You Say"	Lauren Daigle	June 2, 2022	12	Advanced To Final (1st Place)
Grand Final	"Last Thing I'll Ever Need"	Loren Allred	June 5, 2022	14	Finalist (9th Place)

=== Disney ===
On January 27, 2023, the "World of Color – One" for Disney 100 debuted at Disneyland featuring the new original song “Start a Wave” featuring Allred and written by Grammy-nominated artist Cody Fry.

=== 2023 Tour ===
In July 2023, Allred announced that she would be joining Andrea Bocelli and David Foster for select performances throughout Europe, starting in late July 2023, according to Allred and Foster's Instagram.

=== Final Fantasy VII ===
In December 2023, Allred was announced as the performer of the theme song, "No Promises to Keep", for Final Fantasy VII Rebirth at The Game Awards 2023, which also featured a performance of the song.

=== America's Got Talent: Fantasy League ===
In January 2024, she was featured as a contestant on America's Got Talent: Fantasy League at Cowell's invitation, performing a new arrangement of "Never Enough". She was among contestants selected to continue in the competition after that initial performance. She was eliminated at the end of the first semi-final of the competition, after singing "Somewhere Over the Rainbow".

=== Collaboration with Pokémon ===
In August 2026, she worked with The Pokémon Company on the official soundtrack for the 2026 Pokémon World Championships taking place from August 28 to 30, 2026. Allred provided vocals for two songs, "Champions" and "Love Of The Game". The songs were first released on YouTube on August 14, 2026 on The Official Pokémon YouTube Channel.

== Discography ==
=== Extended plays ===
Title	Details	Notes
Late Bloomer	Released: September 24, 2021; Format: Digital download, streaming	Includes "Til I Found You" and "Your Girl."
I Hear Your Voice	Released: April 7, 2023; Format: Digital download	Features "Last Thing I'll Ever Need."
Never Enough (The Remixes)	Released: 2024; Format: Digital download	Includes "Loren's Version" and Ben Bakson Remix.
The Showman Sessions	Released: 2025; Format: Digital download	Reimagined musical theater hits featuring Scott Hoying and VINCINT.

=== Singles ===
==== As primary artist ====
Title	Year	Album
"This Summer"	2020	Late Bloomer
"Last Thing I'll Ever Need"	2022	I Hear Your Voice
"No Promises to Keep"	2024	Final Fantasy VII Rebirth OST
"Never Enough (Loren's Version)"	2024	Never Enough (The Remixes)
"Come Alive" (feat. Scott Hoying)	2025	The Showman Sessions

==== As featured artist ====
Title	Year	Album
"This Is Love" (Hardwell and Kaaze feat. Loren Allred)	2018	Non-album single
"Help Me Make It Through the Night" (Michael Bublé feat. Loren Allred)	2019	Love
"Gusto Ko Nang Bumitaw" (with Troy Laureta and Pia Toscano)	2023	Dalamhati, Vol. 3
"Champions" (Pokémon, Loren Allred)	2026	2026 Pokémon World Championship Official Soundtrack
"Love Of The Game" (Pokémon, Loren Allred)	2026	2026 Pokémon World Championship Official Soundtrack

=== EPs ===
As primary artist
Title	Year	Comment
Late Bloomer	2021	Includes the following songs: "Til I Found You", "This Summer", "Miss Myself", "Perfect", "Your Girl", "Since U Been Gone" (Cover of Kelly Clarkson)
I Hear Your Voice	2023	Includes the following songs: "I Hear Your Voice", "You Say" (Cover Song), "Last Thing I'll Ever Need", "Aren't You Tired (La Di Da)", "Rainbow" (Cover Song), "Last Thing I'll Ever Need (Diva Version)"
Never Enough (The Remixes)	2024	Includes the following songs: "Never Enough (Bright Light Bright Light Remix)", "Never Enough (VMC Remix)", "Never Enough (Ben Bakson Remix)", "Never Enough (Loren's Version)"
The Showman Sessions	2025	Includes the following songs: "Come Alive" (Ft. Scott Hoying), "Rewrite The Stars" (Ft. VINCINT)

=== Singles ===
As primary artist
Title	Year	Album
"I Am" (with Natalie Weiss)	2019	Non-album single
"This Summer"	2020	Late Bloomer EP
"Last Thing I'll Ever Need"	2022	I Hear Your Voice EP
"Never Enough (Loren's Version)"	2024	Non-album single
"No Promises to Keep"	2024	Final Fantasy VII Rebirth Original Soundtrack

==== As featured artist ====
Title	Year	Album
"This Is Love" (Hardwell and Kaaze featuring Loren Allred)	2018	Non-album single
"Araw Gabi" (Troy Laureta featuring Loren Allred)	2021	Non-album single
"Gusto Ko Nang Bumitaw" (Troy Laureta featuring Loren Allred and Pia Toscano)	2023	Dalamhati: A Troy Laureta OPM Collective, Vol. 3

=== Other charted and certified songs ===
List of songs, with selected chart positions and available certifications
Title	Year	Peak chart positions						Certifications	Album
Title	Year	US	IRE	FRA	NZ	SPA	UK	Certifications	Album
"Never Enough"	2017	88	16	97	— (Note: "Never Enough" did not enter the NZ Top 40 Singles Chart, but peaked at number 5 on the NZ Heatseeker Singles Chart.)	81	24	BPI: 2× Platinum; RIAA: Platinum; FIMI: Gold; RMNZ: 2× Platinum	The Greatest Showman: Original Motion Picture Soundtrack
"Never Enough (Reprise)"	2017	—	—	—	—	—	—	BPI: Gold; RMNZ: Gold	The Greatest Showman: Original Motion Picture Soundtrack
"—" denotes a recording that did not chart.

=== Guest appearances ===
Title	Year	Album
"Better This Way" (Joey Contreras featuring Loren Allred)	2014	Young Kind of Love
"Single City" (Michael Mott featuring Loren Allred)	2017	Abandoned Heart
"Ordinary Day" (Loren Allred)	2018	So Much to Say: Songs for Everytown
"Help Me Make It Through the Night" (Michael Bublé featuring Loren Allred)	2018	Love
"Never Enough" (PBS:An Intimate Evening with David Foster)	2019	Never Enough (The Remixes)
