= Pete Ganbarg =

Pete Ganbarg is a 2-time Grammy Award-winning music business executive who served as President of A&R at Atlantic Records from 2008-2024. He currently serves as President of Pure Tone Music.

Pete began his career in A&R in 1989 at SBK Records through a mutual friendship with SBK founder Charles Koppelman's son, Brian Koppelman. Brian had previously encouraged Pete to join the label while student-teaching English in Middletown, Connecticut, stating “one day you have to work for my dad.” When SBK ceased operations in the late-1990s, Pete joined Clive Davis at Arista Records as Sr. Director, A&R. The first artist he worked with at Arista was Santana, for whom Pete conceived and A&R’d the 30× Platinum World Wide, 9X Grammy Winning Album of the Year, Supernatural.

In early 2001, Pete left Arista and joined Epic Records as Sr. Vice President, A&R.

Pete left Epic in late 2003 to start his own A&R consulting business, Pure Tone Music. Pure Tone's label clients included Arista Records, RCA Records, Virgin Records, and Atlantic Records. Company projects included albums by Daughtry, Kelly Clarkson, David Cook, Halestorm, Train, Santana, Kenny G, Aaron Neville, America, Donna Summer, and Chaka Khan.

He joined Atlantic Records as Executive Vice President/Head of A&R in mid-October 2008 and was named President of A&R in late 2017, a position he held until May 2024.

As of 2021, he also hosts "Rock & Roll High School," a podcast interview series that spotlights figures from the history of contemporary music.

Ganbarg is a graduate of Wesleyan University.
