= Alex Lacamoire =

American composer and conductor

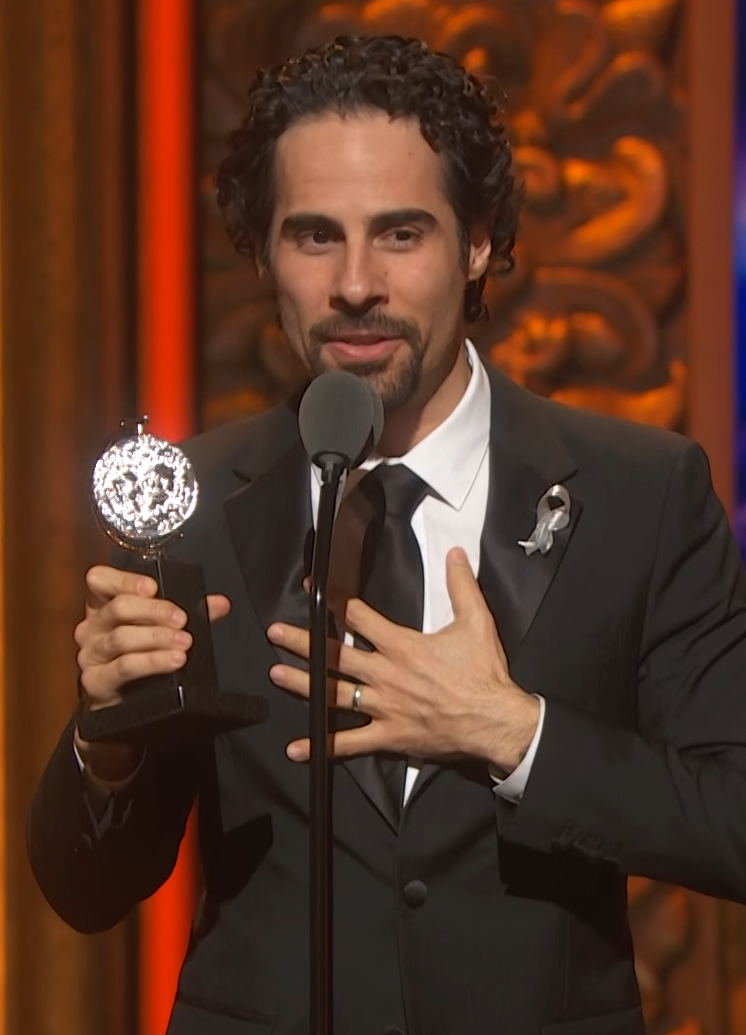
- Lacamoire accepting his 2016 Tony Award
- Born: May 24, 1975 (age 51); Los Angeles, California, U.S.
- Education: Berklee College of Music
- Occupations: Composer, orchestrator, arranger, conductor, musical director, music copyist, record producer
- Years active: 2001–present
- Spouse: Ileana Ferreras (m. 2011)

Alex Lacamoire (born May 24, 1975) is an American composer, arranger, conductor, musical director, music copyist, and orchestrator who has worked on many shows both on and off-Broadway. He is the recipient of multiple Tony and Grammy Awards for his work on shows such as In the Heights (2008), Hamilton (2016), and Dear Evan Hansen (2017). Lacamoire was awarded the Kennedy Center Honor in 2018.

== Early life and education ==
Lacamoire was born in Los Angeles, California and began to play piano at age four. He and his family moved to Miami, Florida when he was nine. He entered Southwood Middle School, a school known for its fine arts program, and went on to New World School of the Arts. He then attended Berklee College of Music, graduating in 1995 with the highest GPA in the class (3.97). At Berklee he studied jazz, arranging, and film scoring.

Lacamoire has hearing loss and uses hearing aids.

== Career ==
Lacamoire's early theatrical credits as music director, arranger, and/or orchestrator include Bat Boy: The Musical (for which he also served as musical director of the 2001 Original Cast Recording); the 2001 National Tour of Godspell; Stephen Schwartz's Captain Louie (for which he also orchestrated the 2005 original cast recording); and Legally Blonde. He also conducted the cast recording of the 2000 touring cast of Godspell. Lacamoire was also the music director of Wicked in 2005, and music supervisor for the musical High Fidelity in 2006, as well as assisting with the orchestrations for that show.

Prior to working on In the Heights, Lacamoire was billed for additional musical arrangements for the original Broadway production of Wicked, and later became the production's Music Director. "After graduation, Lacamoire became first the associate conductor then the musical director for the hit musical Wicked," cites Berklee, where he received a Doctorate in Music.

In 2007, Lacamoire received a Drama Desk Award nomination for Outstanding Orchestrations for the Off-Broadway production of Lin-Manuel Miranda's In the Heights. Following its successful Off-Broadway run, In The Heights transferred to the Richard Rodgers Theatre on Broadway. Lacamoire, along with Bill Sherman, won the 2008 Tony Award for Best Orchestrations and the 2009 Grammy Award for Best Musical Theater Album for their combined work on In The Heights.

In 2012, Lacamoire and Tom Kitt were the Co-Orchestrators of Bring It On the Musical — another collaboration with Lin-Manuel Miranda — for which Lacamoire also served as music supervisor and arranger. Additionally, Lacamoire wrote the dance arrangements for the 2012 Broadway revival of Annie.

Lacamoire was the music director, orchestrator, and conductor for the Broadway production of Hamilton at the Richard Rodgers Theatre, continuing in the roles he held during the show's Off-Broadway production at The Public Theater, as well as the Co-Arranger (along with Lin-Manuel Miranda) of the show's score. In late 2016 Lacamoire transitioned to the role of music supervisor, ending his stint of conducting each show, and instead supervising the music at all of the different productions. Lacamoire won his second Tony Award for Best Orchestrations in 2016 for the Broadway production of Hamilton.

The show's Original Broadway Cast Recording was released digitally on September 25, 2015, and by Atlantic Records as a two-disc set on October 25, 2015. It won a Grammy Award for Best Musical Theater Album in 2016, earning Lacamoire his second Grammy as a record producer.

Lacamoire is a regular participant in Ham4Ham performances which have taken place outside the Richard Rodgers Theatre on days when there are both matinee and evening performances of Hamilton.

Lacamoire is the Music Supervisor of Dear Evan Hansen, a musical for which he won his third Tony award and his third Grammy award. He was the music director, orchestrator and co-arranger of Carmen Jones, later known as Carmen La Cubana, a 2016 Cuban adaptation of Georges Bizet's Carmen. The adaptation features the classic opera score using all-new Cuban musical arrangements. For that Cuban-American production, Lacamoire related it entailed channeling music that's “in my blood.” The show began a European tour in July 2018.

In late 2017, Lacamoire reunited with Lin-Manuel Miranda on his song "Almost Like Praying" to benefit Hurricane Maria relief and recovery operations in Puerto Rico.

Lacamoire was the Executive Music Producer on the film The Greatest Showman in late 2017.

In March 2018, Lacamoire produced Lin-Manuel Miranda's March 2018 Hamildrop, "Found/Tonight". The song also featured Ben Platt. In April 2018, Lacamoire arranged Miranda's April 2018 Hamildrop, "First Burn". The song featured the 5 Elizas who took on the role after Phillipa Soo left the show in July 2016.

In July 2018, Alex Lacamoire appeared on The Hamilcast: A Hamilton Podcast for a series of three episodes. The episodes included a musical breakdown of "The Schuyler Sisters" as well as an in-depth discussion of the music from Hamilton.

In May 2019, Lacamoire received an honorary Doctor of Music degree from Berklee College of Music.

In April 2021, Lacamoire worked as score composer and executive music producer for Lin-Manuel Miranda's animated movie, Sony Pictures Animation's Vivo, which was released on Netflix on August 6, 2021.

Along with Bill Sherman and Kurt Crowley, Lacamoire produced the music for the 2021 film Tick, Tick... Boom!, arranging and adapting songs by composer Jonathan Larson.

== Awards and nominations ==
Year	Award	Category	Nominated work	Result	Ref.
2007	Drama Desk Award	Outstanding Orchestrations	In the Heights	Nominated	
2008	Tony Award	Best Orchestrations	In the Heights	Won	
2009	Grammy Award	Best Musical Theater Album	In the Heights	Won	
2010	Grammy Award	Best Musical Theater Album	9 to 5	Nominated	
2015	Drama Desk Award	Outstanding Orchestrations	Hamilton	Nominated	
2016	Grammy Award	Best Musical Theater Album	Hamilton	Won	
2016	Tony Award	Best Orchestrations	Hamilton	Won	
2017	Tony Award	Best Orchestrations	Dear Evan Hansen	Won	
2018	Grammy Award	Best Musical Theater Album	Dear Evan Hansen	Won	
2018	Olivier Award	Outstanding Achievement in Music (shared with Lin-Manuel Miranda)	Hamilton	Won	
2018	Kennedy Center Honors	(shared with Andy Blankenbuehler, Lin-Manuel Miranda and Thomas Kail)	Hamilton	Won	
2019	Grammy Award	Best Compilation Soundtrack for Visual Media (Executive Producer)	The Greatest Showman	Won	
2019	Primetime Emmy Award	Outstanding Music Direction	Fosse/Verdon (for "Life Is A Cabaret")	Won	
2020	Olivier Awards	Best New Orchestration	Dear Evan Hansen	Won	
