= Hollywood Music in Media Award for Best Music Supervision – Television =

American media music award

Hollywood Music in Media for Best Music Supervision – Television
- Country: United States
- Presented by: Hollywood Music in Media Awards (HMMA)
- First award: 2014
- Currently held by: Nora Felder; The Boroughs (2026)
- Website: www.hmmawards.com

The Hollywood Music in Media Award for Best Music Supervision – Television is one of the awards given annually to people working in the television industry by the Hollywood Music in Media Awards (HMMA). It is presented to the music supervisors who have overseen music for a production. The award was first given in 2014, during the fifth annual awards.

== Winners and nominees ==
=== 2010s ===
Year	Series	Supervisor(s)	Network
(2014); 5th
(2014); 5th	Sons of Anarchy	Michelle Silverman and Bob Thiele Jr.	FX
(2014); 5th	The Leftovers	Liza Richardson	HBO
(2014); 5th	Mad Men	Alexandra Patsavas	AMC
(2014); 5th	Masters of Sex	Liz Gallacher	Showtime
(2014); 5th	Nashville	Frankie Pine	ABC
(2014); 5th	Ray Donovan	Thomas Golubić	Showtime
(2014); 5th	True Detective	Jim Black	HBO
(2015); 6th
(2015); 6th	Empire	Jen Ross & Dave Jordan	Fox
(2015); 6th	American Horror Story: Hotel	PJ Bloom	FX
(2015); 6th	The Blacklist	John Bissell & Jon Bokenkamp	NBC
(2015); 6th	Galavant	Dawn Solar	ABC
(2015); 6th	Girls	Manish Raval & Tom Wolfe	HBO
(2015); 6th	Orange Is the New Black	Bruce Gilbert	Netflix
(2016); 7th
(2016); 7th	Stranger Things	Nora Felder	Netflix
(2016); 7th	Crazy Ex-Girlfriend	Jack Dolgen	The CW
(2016); 7th	Empire	Jen Ross	Fox
(2016); 7th	The Get Down	Stephanie Diaz-Matos and Leon Doyle Bromell	Netflix
(2016); 7th	Vinyl	Meghan Currier & Randall Poster	HBO
(2016); 7th	Younger	Robin Urdang	TV Land
(2017); 8th
(2017); 8th	The Marvelous Mrs. Maisel	Robin Urdang	Amazon
(2017); 8th	13 Reasons Why	Season Kent	Netflix
(2017); 8th	Better Things	Nora Felder	FX
(2017); 8th	The Bold Type	Rob Lowry	Freeform
(2017); 8th	Master of None	Zach Cowie and Kerri Drootin	Netflix
(2017); 8th	This Is Us	Jennifer Pyken	NBC
(2018); 9th
(2018); 9th	Power	Jen Ross	Starz
(2018); 9th	13 Reasons Why	Season Kent	Netflix
(2018); 9th	Castle Rock	Charles Scott IV	Hulu
(2018); 9th	Dear White People	Morgan Rhodes	Netflix
(2018); 9th	GLOW	Bruce Gilbert	Netflix
(2018); 9th	Wild Wild Country	Chris Swanson	Netflix
(2019); 10th
(2019); 10th	Killing Eve	Catherine Grieves and David Holmes	BBC America
(2019); 10th	The End of the F***ing World	Matt Biffa	Netflix
(2019); 10th	GLOW	Bruce Gilbert	Netflix
(2019); 10th	Godfather of Harlem	Stephanie Diaz-Matos and Jordan Carroll	Epix
(2019); 10th	The Politician	Amanda Krieg Thomas	Netflix
(2019); 10th	Vida	Brienne Rose	Starz

=== 2020s ===
Year	Series	Supervisor(s)	Network
(2020); 11th
(2020); 11th	The Eddy	Angela Vicari	Netflix
(2020); 11th	Better Things	Nora Felder & Heather Guibert	FX
(2020); 11th	Ozark	Gabe Hilfer	Netflix
(2020); 11th	P-Valley	Stephanie Diaz-Matos, Sarah Bromberg	Starz
(2020); 11th	Sex Education	Matt Biffa	Netflix
(2020); 11th	The Umbrella Academy	Jen Malone	Netflix
(2021); 12th
(2021); 12th	Ted Lasso	Tony Von Pervieux and Christa Miller	Apple TV+
(2021); 12th	Blindspotting	Jonathan Mchugh	Starz
(2021); 12th	BMF	Derryck “Big Tank” Thornton	Starz
(2021); 12th	Godfather of Harlem	Stephanie Diaz-Matos	Epix
(2021); 12th	Heels	Jonathan Leahy	Starz
(2021); 12th	The Wonder Years	Amani "Burt Blackarach" Smith	ABC
(2022); 13th
(2022); 13th	Stranger Things	Nora Felder	Netflix
(2022); 13th	Bad Sisters	Ciara Elwis	Apple TV+
(2022); 13th	Dahmer – Monster: The Jeffrey Dahmer Story	Amanda Krieg Thomas	Netflix
(2022); 13th	Inventing Anna	Alexandra Patsavas	Netflix
(2022); 13th	Reservation Dogs	Tiffany Anders	Hulu
(2022); 13th	Yellowjackets	Jen Malone and Whitney Pilzer	Showtime
(2023); 14th
(2023); 14th	The Last of Us	Ian Broucek	HBO
(2023); 14th	American Horror Stories: "Bestie"	Anna Romanoff and Amanda Krieg Thomas	FX on Hulu
(2023); 14th	Godfather of Harlem	Stephanie Diaz-Matos and Jordan Carroll	MGM+
(2023); 14th	Swagger	Derryck "Big Tank" Thornton	Apple TV+
(2023); 14th	The Afterparty	Kier Lehman	Apple TV+
(2023); 14th	Yellowjackets	Nora Felder	Showtime
(2024); 15th
(2024); 15th	Fallout	Trygge Toven	Prime Video
(2024); 15th	Baby Reindeer	Catherine Grieves	Netflix
(2024); 15th	Masters of the Air	Deva Anderson and Rachel Lautzenheiser	Apple TV+
(2024); 15th	Nobody Wants This	Este Haim and Zachary Dawes	Netflix
(2024); 15th	Palm Royale	George Drakoulias	Apple TV+
(2025); 16th
(2025); 16th	Dexter: Resurrection	Sean Fernald	Paramount+ Premium
(2025); 16th	Severance	George Drakoulias	Apple TV+
(2025); 16th	Wednesday	Jen Malone and Nicole Weisberg	Netflix
(2025); 16th	Nobody Wants This	Manish Raval, Tom Wolfe, and Jonathan Leahy	Netflix
(2025); 16th	The Summer I Turned Pretty	Melyssa Hardwick	Amazon Prime Video
(2025); 16th	Yellowjackets	Nora Felder	Showtime
(2025); 16th	Étoile	Robin Urdang	Amazon Prime Video
(2026); 17th
(2026); 17th	The Boroughs	Nora Felder	Netflix
(2026); 17th	JAŸ-Z In 8	Sean Fernald and Jody Friedman	HBO Max
(2026); 17th	Margo's Got Money Troubles	Ciara Elwis	Apple TV
(2026); 17th	Monster: The Lizzie Borden Story	Amanda Krieg Thomas and Anna Romanoff	Netflix
(2026); 17th	P-Valley	Stephanie Diaz-Matos, Sarah Bromberg and Katori Hall	Starz
(2026); 17th	The Chi	Derryck "Big Tank" Thornton	Paramount+ Premium
(2026); 17th	The Greatest	Robin Urdang	Amazon Prime Video
(2026); 17th	Widow's Bay	Toko Nagata	Apple TV
