= Grammy Award for Best Compilation Soundtrack for Visual Media =

Musical award

- Awarded for: Quality compilation soundtrack albums
- Country: United States
- Presented by: National Academy of Recording Arts and Sciences
- First award: 2000
- Currently held by: Sinners (2026)
- Website: grammy.com

The Grammy Award for Best Compilation Soundtrack for Visual Media has been awarded since 2000.

== History ==
In 2000 the award was presented as the Grammy Award for Best Soundtrack Album, and from 2001 to 2011 as Best Compilation Soundtrack Album for Motion Pictures, Television or Other Visual Media.

Since 2012, the category has been known as Best Compilation Soundtrack for Visual Media.

Years reflect the year in which the Grammy Awards were presented, for music released in the previous year. The award is presented to the artist or artists of a majority of tracks or the producer or producers of a majority of tracks on the album. In the absence of either, then the award goes to the individual(s) actively responsible for the musical direction of the album. Music supervisors became eligible in this category in 2019.

== Recipients ==
=== 2000s ===
Year (Note: Each year is linked to the article about the Grammy Awards held that year.)	Album	Artist(s)	Production team
2000
2000	Tarzan	Phil Collins	Phil Collins and Mark Mancina, producers
2000	American Beauty	Various Artists	Chris Douridas and Sam Mendes, producers
2000	Austin Powers: The Spy Who Shagged Me	Various Artists	Danny Bramson and Guy Oseary, compilation producers
2000	The Matrix	Various Artists	Jason Bentley, Guy Oseary and Russ Rieger, compilation producers
2000	The Prince of Egypt	Various Artists	Hans Zimmer, producer
2001
2001	Almost Famous	Various Artists	Danny Bramson and Cameron Crowe, producers
2001	Fantasia 2000	James Levine conducting The Chicago Symphony Orchestra	Jay David Saks, producer
2001	High Fidelity	Various Artists	John Cusack and Kathy Nelson, producers
2001	Magnolia	Aimee Mann	—N/a
2001	The Sopranos	Various Artists	Martin Bruestle and David Chase, producers
2002
2002	O Brother, Where Art Thou?	Various Artists	T Bone Burnett, producer
2002	Bridget Jones's Diary	Various Artists	Nick Angel and Kathy Nelson, compilation producers
2002	Moulin Rouge!	Various Artists	Marius De Vries, Baz Luhrmann and Anton Monsted, compilation producers
2002	Shrek	Various Artists	Marylata E. Jacob and Michael Ostin, compilation producers
2002	The Sopranos: Peppers & Eggs	Various Artists	Martin Bruestle and David Chase, compilation producers
2003
2003	Standing in the Shadows of Motown	The Funk Brothers and Various Artists	Ted Greenberg, Allan Slutsky and Harry Weinger, compilation producers; Ted Greenberg and Kooster McAllister, engineers/mixers
2003	Dogtown and Z-Boys	Various Artists	Debra MacCulloch, Howard Paar and Stacy Peralta, compilation producers
2003	I Am Sam	Various Artists	Andy Gershon, Kate Hyman and Jon Sidel, compilation producers
2003	Six Feet Under	Various Artists	Gary Calamar and Thomas Golubić, compilation producers
2003	Y Tu Mamá También	Various Artists	Alfonso Cuarón, Camilo Lara and Liza Richardson, compilation producers
2004
2004	Chicago	Various Artists	Randy Spendlove and Ric Wake, compilation producers; Dan Hetzel, engineer/mixer
2004	Gangs of New York	Various Artists	Robbie Robertson, Martin Scorsese and Hal Willner, compilation producers
2004	Kill Bill Vol. 1	Various Artists	Quentin Tarantino, compilation producer
2004	A Mighty Wind	Various Artists	CJ Vanston, compilation producer
2004	School of Rock	Various Artists	Jack Black, Richard Linklater and Randall Poster, compilation producers
2005
2005	Garden State	Various Artists	Zach Braff, compilation producer
2005	Cold Mountain	Various Artists	T Bone Burnett, compilation producer
2005	De-Lovely	Various Artists	Peter Asher and Stephen Endelman, compilation producers
2005	Kill Bill Vol. 2	Various Artists	Quentin Tarantino, compilation producer
2005	Shrek 2	Various Artists	Andrew Adamson, Christopher Douridas and Michael Ostin, compilation producers
2006
2006	Ray	Ray Charles	James Austin, Stuart Benjamin and Taylor Hackford, compilation producers
2006	Beyond the Sea	Kevin Spacey	Phil Ramone, compilation producer
2006	Napoleon Dynamite	Various Artists	Brian McNelis and Skip Williamson, compilation producers
2006	No Direction Home: The Soundtrack — Bootleg Series, Vol. 7	Bob Dylan	Steve Berkowitz, Bruce Dickinson and Jeff Rosen, compilation producers
2006	Six Feet Under, Vol. 2: Everything Ends	Various Artists	Gary Calamar, Thomas Golubic and Errol Kolosine, compilation producers
2007
2007	Walk the Line	Joaquin Phoenix and Various Artists	T Bone Burnett, producer; Mike Piersante, engineer/mixer
2007	Brokeback Mountain	Various Artists	Gustavo Santaolalla, producer
2007	Cars	Various Artists	Chris Montan and Randy Newman, producers
2007	Grey's Anatomy — Volume 2	Various Artists	Mitchell Leib and Alexandra Patsavas, producers
2007	Little Miss Sunshine	Various Artists	Mychael Danna, producer
2008
2008	Love	The Beatles	George Martin and Giles Martin, producers; Paul Hicks, engineer/mixer
2008	Across the Universe	Various Artists	T Bone Burnett, Matthias Gohl and Elliot Goldenthal, producers
2008	Dreamgirls	Various Artists	Harvey Mason, Randy Spendlove, Matt Sullivan and Damon Thomas, producers
2008	Hairspray	Various Artists	Marc Shaiman, producer
2008	Once	Glen Hansard and Markéta Irglová	Glen Hansard, producer
2009
2009	Juno	Various Artists	Jason Reitman, Margaret Yen and Peter Afterman, producers
2009	American Gangster	Various Artists	Kathy Nelson and Ridley Scott, producers
2009	August Rush	Various Artists	Richard Lewis, producer
2009	Mamma Mia!	Meryl Streep and Various Artists	Benny Anderson, producer
2009	Sweeney Todd: The Demon Barber of Fleet Street	Various Artists	Mike Higham, producer

=== 2010s ===
Year	Album	Artist(s)	Production team
2010
2010	Slumdog Millionaire	Various Artists	A. R. Rahman, producer; H. Sridhar, P. A. Deepak and Vivianne Chaix, engineers/mixers
2010	Cadillac Records	Various Artists	Steve Jordan, producer
2010	Inglourious Basterds	Various Artists	Quentin Tarantino, producer
2010	True Blood	Various Artists	Alan Ball, Gary Calamar and Kevin Weaver, producers
2010	Twilight	Various Artists	Paul Katz and Alexandra Patsavas, producers
2011
2011	Crazy Heart	Various Artists	Stephen Bruton and T Bone Burnett, producers
2011	Glee: The Music, Volume 1	Glee Cast	Adam Anders, Peer Åström and Ryan Murphy, producers
2011	Tremé	Various Artists	Blake Leyh and Tony Seyler, producers
2011	True Blood — Volume 2	Various Artists	Alan Ball, Gary Calamar and Kevin Weaver, producers
2011	The Twilight Saga: Eclipse	Various Artists	Paul Katz and Alexandra Patsavas, producers
2012
2012	Boardwalk Empire: Volume 1	Various Artists	Stewart Lerman, Randall Poster and Kevin Weaver, producers; Stewart Lerman, engineer/mixer
2012	Burlesque	Christina Aguilera	—N/a
2012	Glee: The Music, Volume 4	Glee Cast	Adam Anders, Peer Åström and Ryan Murphy, producers
2012	Tangled	Various Artists	Alan Menken, producer
2012	True Blood — Volume 3	Various Artists	Gary Calamar, producer
2013
2013	Midnight in Paris	Various Artists	Woody Allen, producer
2013	The Descendants	Various Artists	Dondi Bastone and Alexander Payne, producers
2013	Marley	Bob Marley & The Wailers	Chris Blackwell and Barry Cole, producers
2013	The Muppets	Various Artists	Kaylin Frank and Mitchell Leib, producers
2013	Rock of Ages	Various Artists	Adam Anders and Peer Åström, producers
2014
2014	Sound City: Real to Reel	Dave Grohl and Various Artists	Butch Vig, compilation producer; James Brown, engineer/mixer
2014	Django Unchained	Various Artists	Quentin Tarantino, compilation producer
2014	The Great Gatsby (Deluxe Edition)	Various Artists	Baz Luhrmann and Anthony Seyler, compilation producers
2014	Les Misérables (Deluxe Edition)	Various Artists	Cameron Mackintosh, Lee McCutcheon and Stephan Metcalfe, compilation producers
2014	Muscle Shoals	Various Artists	Stephan Badger and Greg Camalier, compilation producers
2015
2015	Frozen	Various Artists	Kristen Anderson-Lopez, Robert Lopez, Tom MacDougall and Chris Montan, compilation producers; David Boucher, engineer/mixer
2015	American Hustle	Various Artists	Susan Jacobs and David O. Russell, compilation producers
2015	Get On Up: The James Brown Story	James Brown	Peter Afterman and Harry Weinger, compilation producers; Budd Carr and Margaret Yen, music supervisors
2015	Guardians of the Galaxy: Awesome Mix Vol. 1	Various Artists	James Gunn, compilation producer; Dave Jordan, music supervisor
2015	The Wolf of Wall Street	Various Artists	Robbie Robertson, compilation producer; Randall Poster, music supervisor
2016
2016	Glen Campbell: I'll Be Me	Various Artists	Julian Raymond, compilation producer; Jeff Pollack, music supervisor
2016	Empire: Season 1	Various Artists	Jim Beanz and Timbaland, compilation producers; Jen Ross, music supervisor
2016	Fifty Shades of Grey	Various Artists	Mike Knobloch and Dana Sano, compilation producers
2016	Pitch Perfect 2	Various Artists	Julianne Jordan, Harvey Mason Jr. and Julia Michels, compilation producers
2016	Selma	Various Artists	Ava DuVernay, compilation producer; Morgan Rhodes, music supervisor
2017
2017	Miles Ahead	Miles Davis & Various Artists	Steve Berkowitz, Don Cheadle and Robert Glasper, compilation producers; Ed Gerrard, music supervisor
2017	Amy	Various Artists	Salaam Remi and Mark Ronson, compilation producers; Iain Cooke, music supervisor
2017	Straight Outta Compton	Various Artists	O'Shea Jackson and Andre Young, compilation producers; Jojo Villanueva, music supervisor
2017	Suicide Squad (Collector's Edition)	Various Artists	Mike Caren, Darren Higman and Kevin Weaver, compilation producers; Gabe Hilfer and Season Kent, music supervisors
2017	Vinyl: The Essentials Season 1	Various Artists	Stewart Lerman, Randall Poster and Kevin Weaver, compilation producers; Meghan Currier, music supervisor
2018
2018	La La Land	Various Artists	Justin Hurwitz and Marius de Vries, compilation producers, Steven Gizicki, music supervisor; Nicholai Baxter, engineer/mixer
2018	Baby Driver	Various Artists	Edgar Wright, compilation producer
2018	Guardians of the Galaxy Vol. 2: Awesome Mix Vol. 2	Various Artists	James Gunn, compilation producer
2018	Hidden Figures: The Album	Various Artists	Pharrell Williams, compilation producer
2018	Moana: The Songs	Various Artists	Opetaia Foa'i, Tom MacDougall, Mark Mancina and Lin-Manuel Miranda, compilation producers
2019
2019	The Greatest Showman	Hugh Jackman and Various Artists	Alex Lacamoire, Benj Pasek, Justin Paul and Greg Wells, compilation producers; Derik Lee, Ian MacGregor and Greg Wells, engineers/mixers
2019	Call Me by Your Name	Various Artists	Luca Guadagnino, compilation producer; Robin Urdang, music supervisor
2019	Deadpool 2	Various Artists	David Leitch and Ryan Reynolds, compilation producers; John Houlihan, music supervisor
2019	Lady Bird	Various Artists	Timothy J. Smith, compilation producer; Michael Hill and Brian Ross, music supervisors
2019	Stranger Things	Various Artists	Matt Duffer, Ross Duffer and Timothy J. Smith, compilation producers; Nora Felder, music supervisor

=== 2020s ===
Year	Album	Artist(s)	Production team
2020
2020	A Star Is Born	Lady Gaga and Bradley Cooper	Paul "DJWS" Blair, Bradley Cooper, Lady Gaga, Nick Monson, Lukas Nelson, Mark Nilan Jr. and Benjamin Rice, compilation producers; Julianne Jordan and Julia Michels, music supervisors; Tom Elmhirst, engineer/mixer
2020	The Lion King: The Songs	Various Artists	Jon Favreau and Hans Zimmer, compilation producers
2020	Once Upon a Time in Hollywood	Various Artists	Quentin Tarantino, compilation producer; Mary Ramos, music supervisor
2020	Rocketman	Taron Egerton	Giles Martin, compilation producer
2020	Spider-Man: Into the Spider-Verse	Various Artists	Spring Aspers and Dana Sano, compilation producers; Kier Lehman, music supervisor
2021
2021	Jojo Rabbit	Various Artists	Taika Waititi, compilation producer
2021	A Beautiful Day in the Neighborhood	Various Artists	Nate Heller, compilation producer; Howard Paar, music supervisor
2021	Bill & Ted Face the Music	Various Artists	Jonathan Leahy, compilation producer
2021	Eurovision Song Contest: The Story of Fire Saga	Various Artists	Savan Kotecha, compilation producer; Becky Bentham, music supervisor
2021	Frozen 2	Various Artists	Kristen Anderson-Lopez, Robert Lopez, Tom MacDougall and Dave Metzger, compilation producers
2022
2022	The United States vs. Billie Holiday	Andra Day	Salaam Remi, compilation producer; Lynn Fainchtein, music supervisor; Jimmy Douglass, Ryan Evans and Salaam Remi, engineers/mixers
2022	Cruella	Various Artists	Craig Gillespie, compilation producer; Susan Jacobs, music supervisor
2022	Dear Evan Hansen	Ben Platt and Various Artists	Alex Lacamoire, Benj Pasek, Justin Paul and Dan Romer, compilation producers; Jordan Carroll, music supervisor
2022	In the Heights	Various Artists	Alex Lacamoire, Lin-Manuel Miranda, Bill Sherman and Greg Wells, compilation producers; Steven Gizicki, music supervisor
2022	One Night in Miami...	Leslie Odom Jr. and Various Artists	Nicholai Baxter, compilation producer; Randall Poster, music supervisor
2022	Respect	Jennifer Hudson	Stephen Bray and Jason Michael Webb, compilation producers
2022	Schmigadoon! Episode 1	Various Artists	Doug Besterman, Cinco Paul and Scott M. Riesett, compilation producers
2023
2023	Encanto	Various Artists	Mike Elizondo, Tom MacDougall and Lin-Manuel Miranda, compilation producers; David Boucher and Joey Raia, engineers/mixers
2023	Elvis	Various Artists	Dave Cobb, Baz Luhrmann, Jameson Shaw and Elliott Wheeler, compilation producers; Anton Monsted, music supervisor
2023	Stranger Things: Soundtrack from the Netflix Original Series, Season 4 (Vol. 2)	Various Artists	Matt Duffer and Ross Duffer, compilation producers; Nora Felder, music supervisor
2023	Top Gun: Maverick	Various Artists	Lorne Balfe, Harold Faltermeyer, Lady Gaga and Hans Zimmer, compilation producers
2023	West Side Story	Various Artists	David Newman, Matt Sullivan and Jeanine Tesori, compilation producers
2024
2024	Barbie the Album	Various Artists	Brandon Davis, Mark Ronson and Kevin Weaver, compilation producers; George Drakoulias, music supervisor
2024	Aurora	Daisy Jones & the Six	Brandon Davis, Pete Ganbarg, Joseph Khoury and Blake Mills, compilation producers; Frankie Pine, music supervisor
2024	Black Panther: Wakanda Forever — Music from and Inspired By	Various Artists	Ryan Coogler, Archie Davis and Ludwig Göransson, compilation producers; Dave Jordan, music supervisor
2024	Guardians of the Galaxy, Vol. 3: Awesome Mix, Vol. 3	Various Artists	Kevin Feige, James Gunn and Dave Jordan, compilation producers; Dave Jordan, music supervisor
2024	Weird: The Al Yankovic Story	"Weird" Al Yankovic	Leo Birenberg, Zach Robinson and Al Yankovic, compilation producers; Suzanne Coffman, music supervisor
2025
2025	Maestro: Music by Leonard Bernstein	Bradley Cooper and Yannick Nézet-Séguin	Bradley Cooper, Yannick Nézet-Séguin and Jason Ruder, compilation producers; Steven Gizicki, music supervisor
2025	The Color Purple	Various Artists	Nick Baxter, Blitz Bazawule and Stephen Bray, compilation producers; Jordan Carroll and Morgan Rhodes, music supervisors
2025	Deadpool & Wolverine	Various Artists	Dave Jordan, Shawn Levy and Ryan Reynolds, compilation producers; Dave Jordan, music supervisor
2025	Saltburn	Various Artists	Emerald Fennell, compilation producer; Kirsten Lane, music supervisor
2025	Twisters: The Album	Various Artists	Ian Cripps, Brandon Davis, Joe Khoury and Kevin Weaver, compilation producers; Mike Knobloch and Rachel Levy, music supervisors
2026
2026	Sinners	Various Artists	Ryan Coogler, Ludwig Göransson and Serena Göransson, compilation producers; Nikki Sherod, music supervisor
2026	A Complete Unknown	Timothée Chalamet	Nick Baxter, Steven Gizicki and James Mangold, compilation producers; Steven Gizicki, music supervisor
2026	F1 the Album	Various Artists	Brandon Davis, Joe Khoury and Kevin Weaver, compilation producers; David Taylor and Jake Voulgarides, music supervisors
2026	KPop Demon Hunters	Various Artists	Spring Aspers and Dana Sano, compilation producers; Ian Eisendrath, music supervisor
2026	Wicked	Cynthia Erivo, Ariana Grande and Wicked Movie Cast	Stephen Oremus, Stephen Schwartz and Greg Wells, compilation producers; Maggie Rodford, music supervisor
2027	The Devil Wears Prada 2	Various Artists	TBC
2027	Stranger Things: Season 5	Various Artists	TBC
2027	Wicked: For Good	Various Artists	TBC
2027	The Wizard of Oz at Sphere	Various Artists	TBC
2027	Wuthering Heights	Charli XCX	TBC

== Multiple wins ==
3 wins

- T Bone Burnett

2 wins

- Bradley Cooper
- Steven Gizicki
- Kevin Weaver

== Multiple nominations ==
8 nominations

- Kevin Weaver

5 nominations

- T Bone Burnett
- Gary Calamar
- Randall Poster
- Quentin Tarantino

4 nominations

- Brandon Davis
- Steven Gizicki
- Dave Jordan

3 nominations

- Adam Anders
- Peer Åström
- James Gunn
- Alex Lacamoire
- Baz Luhrmann
- Tom MacDougall
- Lin-Manuel Miranda
- Ryan Murphy
- Kathy Nelson
- Alexandra Patsavas
- Dana Sano
- Greg Wells
- Hans Zimmer

2 nominations

- Spring Aspers
- Alan Ball
- Nick Baxter
- Steve Berkowitz
- Danny Bramson
- Stephen Bray
- David Chase
- Ryan Coogler
- Bradley Cooper
- Matt Duffer
- Ross Duffer
- Ludwig Göransson
- Joe Khoury
- Lady Gaga
- Stewart Lerman
- Mark Mancina
- Giles Martin
- Harvey Mason Jr.
- Guy Oseary
- Salaam Remi
- Ryan Reynolds
- Robbie Robertson
- Mark Ronson
- Marius de Vries

== See also ==
- Grammy Award for Best Score Soundtrack for Visual Media
