= Hollywood Music in Media Award for Best Music Supervision – Film =

Award given annually to Hollywood workers

Hollywood Music in Media for Best Music Supervision - Film
- Country: United States
- Presented by: Hollywood Music in Media Awards (HMMA)
- First award: 2014
- Currently held by: Julia Michels; The Devil Wears Prada 2 (2026)
- Website: www.hmmawards.com

The Hollywood Music in Media Award for Best Music Supervision – Film is one of the awards given annually to people working in the motion picture industry by the Hollywood Music in Media Awards (HMMA).

== History ==
It is presented to the music supervisors who have overseen music for a production. The award was first given in 2014, during the fifth annual awards.

== Winners and nominees ==
=== 2010s ===
Year	Film	Nominees
(2014); 5th
(2014); 5th	The Fault in Our Stars	Season Kent
(2014); 5th	The Book of Life	John Houlihan
(2014); 5th	Boyhood	Meghan Currier and Randall Poster
(2014); 5th	Divergent	Randall Poster
(2014); 5th	The Giver	Dana Sano
(2014); 5th	Guardians of the Galaxy	Dave Jordan
(2014); 5th	The Secret Life of Walter Mitty	George Drakoulias
(2014); 5th	Wish I Was Here	Holly Adams, Mary Ramos
(2015); 6th
(2015); 6th	Fifty Shades of Grey	Dana Sano
(2015); 6th	Entourage	Scott Vener
(2015); 6th	Straight Outta Compton	Jojo Villanueva
(2015); 6th	Magic Mike XXL	Season Kent
(2015); 6th	Pitch Perfect 2	Julia Michels and Julianne Jordan
(2016); 7th
(2016); 7th	Sing	Jojo Villanueva
(2016); 7th	Deadpool	John Houlihan
(2016); 7th	La La Land	Steven Gizicki
(2016); 7th	Middle School: The Worst Years of My Life	Dave Jordan and Jojo Villanueva
(2016); 7th	Suicide Squad	Gabe Hilfer and Season Kent
(2016); 7th	Trolls	Julia Michels and Julianne Jordan
(2017); 8th
(2017); 8th	Lady Bird	Brian Ross
(2017); 8th	Fifty Shades Darker	Dana Sano
(2017); 8th	The Florida Project	Matthew Hearon-Smith
(2017); 8th	Guardians of the Galaxy Vol. 2	Dave Jordan
(2017); 8th	Pitch Perfect 3	Julia Michels and Julianne Jordan
(2018); 9th
(2018); 9th	A Star Is Born	Julianne Jordan and Julia Michaels
(2018); 9th	Black Panther	Dave Jordan
(2018); 9th	Bohemian Rhapsody	Becky Bentham
(2018); 9th	Deadpool 2	John Houlihan
(2018); 9th	Love, Simon	Season Kent
(2018); 9th	Tag	Gabe Hilfer
(2019); 10th
(2019); 10th	Once Upon a Time in Hollywood	Mary Ramos
(2019); 10th	Hobbs & Shaw	Rachel Levy
(2019); 10th	Marriage Story	George Drakoulias
(2019); 10th	Queen & Slim	Kier Lehman
(2019); 10th	Yesterday	Angela Leus

=== 2020s ===
Year	Film	Nominees
(2020); 11th
(2020); 11th	The Life Ahead	Bonnie Greenberg
(2020); 11th	The 40-Year-Old Version	Guy C. Routte
(2020); 11th	The High Note	Linda Cohen
(2020); 11th	Promising Young Woman	Sue Jacobs
(2020); 11th	Soul	Tom MacDougall
(2020); 11th	Trolls World Tour	Angela Leus
(2020); 11th	The United States vs. Billie Holiday	Lynn Fainchtein
(2021); 12th
(2021); 12th	CODA	Alexandra Patsavas
(2021); 12th	Flag Day	Tracy McKnight
(2021); 12th	Licorice Pizza	Linda Cohen
(2021); 12th	Queenpins	Jason Markey
(2021); 12th	Sing 2	Mike Knobloch & Rachel Levy
(2021); 12th	The Velvet Underground	Randall Poster
(2022); 13th
(2022); 13th	Elvis	Anton Monsted
(2022); 13th	Bros	Rob Lowry
(2022); 13th	Doctor Strange in the Multiverse of Madness	Dave Jordan
(2022); 13th	Everything Everywhere All at Once	Bruce Gilbert and Lauren Marie Mikus
(2022); 13th	Minions: The Rise of Gru	Mike Knobloch and Rachel Levy
(2022); 13th	X	Joe Rudge
(2023); 14th
(2023); 14th	Trolls Band Together	Angela Leus
(2023); 14th	Air	Andrea Von Foerster
(2023); 14th	Fast X	Rachel Levy
(2023); 14th	Immediate Family	Mason Cooper
(2023); 14th	Love to Love You, Donna Summer	Tracy McKnight
(2023); 14th	Trap Jazz	Tamar Davis
(2024); 15th
(2024); 15th	Deadpool & Wolverine	Dave Jordan
(2024); 15th	A Complete Unknown	Steven Gizicki
(2024); 15th	Jim Henson Idea Man	LaMarcus Miller & Livy Rodriguez-Behar
(2024); 15th	Out of My Mind	Susan Jacobs & Jackie Mulhearn
(2024); 15th	The Idea of You	Frankie Pine & Marcus Tamkin
(2024); 15th	Twisters	Rachel Levy
(2025); 16th
(2025); 16th	Bridget Jones: Mad About the Boy	Nick Angel
(2025); 16th	The Ballad of Wallis Island	Gary Welch
(2025); 16th	Christy	Jemma Burns
(2025); 16th	Ruth & Boaz	Ashley Neumeister
(2025); 16th	Wicked: For Good	Maggie Rodford
(2025); 16th	Winter Spring Summer or Fall	Mike Turner and Jonathan Lane
(2026); 17th
(2026); 17th	The Devil Wears Prada 2	Julia Michels
(2026); 17th	40 Watts from Nowhere	Mara Kuge
(2026); 17th	Michael	John Warhurst
(2026); 17th	Mr. Irrelevant	Gabe Hilfer
(2026); 17th	Tony	Mandy Malmet
(2026); 17th	Wuthering Heights	Nicolette Di Dia
