= Guild of Music Supervisors Award for Best Music Supervision for Films Budgeted Over $25 Million =

The Best Music Supervision for Films Budgeted Over $25 Million award is annually given by the Guild of Music Supervisors at the Guild of Music Supervisors Awards to honor the best music supervision in a film with a budget over $25 million. It was first given at their 3rd Annual Awards function, and has continued since then. In 2014, the Award was re-titled Best Music Supervision for Films Over $35 million, but reverted to its original name the following year.

== Winners and nominees ==
=== 2010s ===
Year	Film	Music Supervisor(s)	Budget
2012	Django Unchained	Mary Ramos	$100 Million
2012	American Reunion	Jojo Villanueva	$50 Million
2012	Argo	Linda Cohen	$44.5 Million
2012	Hope Springs	Julia Michels	$30 Million
2012	Rock of Ages	Matthew Rush Sullivan	$75 Million
2012	Step Up Revolution	Buck Damon	$50 Million
2012	This Is 40	Jonathan Karp	$35 Million
2012	21 Jump Street	Karen Glauber	$42 Million
2012	The Twilight Saga: Breaking Dawn – Part 2	Alexandra Patsavas	$136.2 Million
2013	American Hustle	Susan Jacobs	$40 Million
2013	The Great Gatsby	Anton Monsted	$105 Million
2013	The Internship	Dave Jordan & Jojo Villanueva	$58 Million
2013	The Secret Life of Walter Mitty	George Drakoulias	$90 Million
2013	The Wolf of Wall Street	Randall Poster	$75 Million
2014	Guardians of the Galaxy	Dave Jordan	$232.3 Million
2014	Annie	Matthew Rush Sullivan and Wende Crowley	$65 Million
2014	The Book of Life	John Houlihan	$50 Million
2014	Get on Up	Budd Carr & Margaret Yen	$30 Million
2014	Into the Woods	Paul Gemignani & Michael Higham	$50 Million
2015	Straight Outta Compton	Jojo Villanueva	$50 Million
2015	Creed	Gabe Hilfer	$35 Million
2015	Fifty Shades of Grey	Dana Sano	$40 Million
2015	Kingsman: The Secret Service	Ian Neil	$81 Million
2015	Pitch Perfect 2	Julia Michels and Julianne Jordan	$29 Million
2016	La La Land	Steven Gizicki	$30 Million
2016	Deadpool	John Houlihan	$58 Million
2016	Sing	Jojo Villanueva	$75 Million
2016	Sing Street	Becky Bentham	$4 Million
2016	Trolls	Julia Michels and Julianne Jordan	$125 Million
2017	Pitch Perfect 3	Julia Michels and Julianne Jordan	$45 Million
2017	Beauty and the Beast	Matt Sullivan	$160 Million
2017	Coco	Tom MacDougall	$175 Million
2017	The Greatest Showman	Benj Pasek and Justin Paul	$84 Million
2017	Guardians of the Galaxy Vol. 2	Dave Jordan	$200 Million
2018	A Star is Born	Julia Michels and Julianne Jordan	$36 Million
2018	Black Panther	Dave Jordan	$200 Million
2018	Bohemian Rhapsody	Becky Bentham	$52 Million
2018	Mary Poppins Returns	Michael Higham and Paul Gemignani	$130 Million
2018	Peter Rabbit	Wende Crowley	$50 Million
2019	Once Upon a Time in Hollywood	Mary Ramos	$90 Million
2019	Frozen 2	Tom MacDougall	$150 Million
2019	Aladdin	Matt Sullivan	$183 Million
2019	Ford v Ferrari	Ted Caplan	$97.6 Million
2019	The Irishman	Randall Poster	$159–250 million

=== 2020s ===
Year	Film	Music Supervisor(s)	Budget
2020	Soul	Tom MacDougall	$150 Million
2020	Bill & Ted Face the Music	Jonathan Leahy	$25 Million
2020	Eurovision Song Contest: The Story of Fire Saga	Becky Bentham	$35 Million
2020	Jingle Jangle: A Christmas Journey	Julia Michels	>$25 Million
2020	Trolls World Tour	Angela Leus	$90–110 million
2021	Tick, Tick... Boom!	Steven Gizicki	$55 million
2021	Being the Ricardos	Mary Ramos	$25 million
2021	Encanto	Tom MacDougall	$120–150 million
2021	The Harder They Fall	Michelle Silverman	$90 million
2021	The Tender Bar	Linda Cohen	$25 million
2022	Elvis	Anton Monsted	$85 million
2022	A Jazzman's Blues	Joel C. High	$25 million
2022	Black Panther: Wakanda Forever	Dave Jordan	$200–250 million
2022	Glass Onion: A Knives Out Mystery	Julie Glaze Houlihan	$40 million
2022	The Greatest Beer Run Ever	Tom Wolfe and Manish Raval	$40 million
2022	I Wanna Dance with Somebody	Maureen Crowe and Becky Bentham	$45 million
2022	Minions: The Rise of Gru	Rachel Levy and Mike Knobloch	$80–100 million
2022	Spirited	Linda Cohen	$75 million
2022	Tár	Mike Knobloch, Natalie Hayden and Lucy Bright	$25 million
2022	Turning Red	Tom MacDougall	$175 million
2023	Barbie	George Drakoulias	$128–145 million
2023	Air	Andrea von Foerster	$70–90 million
2023	Are You There God? It's Me, Margaret.	Frankie Pine	$30 million
2023	The Holdovers	Matt Aberle	$13–31 million
2023	Maestro	Steven Gizicki	$80 million
2023	My Big Fat Greek Wedding 3	Deva Anderson and Rachel Lautzenheiser	$18–36 million
2023	Saltburn	Kirsten Lane	$75 million
2023	Spider-Man: Across the Spider-Verse	Kier Lehman	$100–150 million
2023	They Cloned Tyrone	Stephanie Diaz-Matos and Philippe Pierre	$45 million
2023	Wonka	James A. Taylor	$125 million
