= Midnight in Paris (soundtrack) =

Midnight in Paris: Music from the Motion Picture

Soundtrack album by various artists
- Released: December 9, 2011
- Genre: Jazz; contemporary classical; swing; rhythm and blues
- Length: 46:41
- Label: Madison Gate

Midnight in Paris is a 2011 fantasy comedy film written and directed by Woody Allen, and starred Owen Wilson, Rachel McAdams and Marion Cotillard. The film featured no original music, but mostly incidental source music from the 1920s French jazz music, which Allen had used as an integral part of the film, similar to his previous ventures. The album Midnight in Paris: Music from the Motion Picture was released on December 9, 2011, by Madison Gate Records and won an award for Best Compilation Soundtrack for Visual Media at the 55th Annual Grammy Awards in 2013.

== Reception ==
Matt Collar of AllMusic wrote "Swooning and romantic in tone with a breezy, swinging jazz vibe throughout, the Midnight in Paris soundtrack is a must-have souvenir for traditional jazz lovers and any fan of the film." Michael V. Tueth of America Magazine wrote that the soundtrack is "a brassy jazz tune" instead of "Gershwin rhapsody". Jonathan Jones of The Guardian wrote "This is also the jazz age, signalled by some of Allen's favourite jazz on the soundtrack as well as appearances by legendary dancer Josephine Baker, a hero to modern artists, and the era's definitive songwriter, Cole Porter."

David Salazar of OperaWire had addressed the use of Offenbach's Barcarolle being crucial for the film's plot, saying "Music plays a vital role in establishing time period with Gil's first interaction of the 1920s featuring Cole Porter at the piano with one of his compositions. When the time comes for the "Belle Epoch," the couple's arrival at Maxim's is marked by the Barcarolle performed by musicians. Despite the fact that it is clear that their playing is not in sync with the music they are supposedly playing, the famed tune helps contextualize the time period. We believe the time period because we recognize the music as being of that era."

== Track listing ==
No.	Title	Performer(s)	Length
1.	"Si tu vois ma mere"	Sidney Bechet	3:14
2.	"Je suis seul ce soir"	Swing 41	5:50
3.	"Recado"	Original Paris Swing	4:07
4.	"Bistro Fada"	Stephane Wrembel	3:05
5.	"Let's Do It, Let's Fall in Love"	Conal Fowkes	2:57
6.	"You've Got That Thing"	Conal Fowkes	1:44
7.	"La conga blicoti"	Josephine Baker	2:25
8.	"You Do Something to Me"	Conal Fowkes	2:00
9.	"I Love Penny Sue"	Daniel May	3:17
10.	"Charleston"	Enoch Light & The Charleston City All Stars	2:19
11.	"Ain't She Sweet"	Enoch Light & The Charleston City All Stars	2:29
12.	"Parlez-moi d'amour"	Dana Boule	3:00
13.	"Barcarolle from "The Tales of Hoffmann""	Conal Fowkes, Yrving & Lisa Yeras	2:21
14.	"Can-Can from "Orpheus in the Underworld""	Czech National Symphony Orchestra	2:27
15.	"Ballad du Paris"	Francois Parisi	3:14
16.	"Le parc de plaisir"	Francois Parisi	2:12
Total length:			46:41

== Chart performance ==
Chart (2011)	Peak position
Mexican Albums (AMPROFON)	80

== Accolades ==
Award	Category	Result
Grammy Awards	Best Compilation Soundtrack For Visual Media	Won
