= Aurora (Daisy Jones & the Six album) =

2023 album by Daisy Jones & the Six

Studio album / soundtrack album by Daisy Jones & the Six
- Released: March 1, 2023
- Recorded: 2022–2023
- Studios: Sound City Studios, Los Angeles
- Genres: Rock; soft rock
- Length: 44:28
- Label: Atlantic
- Producers: Blake Mills; Kevin Weaver; Pete Ganbarg; Brandon Davis; Joseph Khoury

Singles from Aurora
- 1. "Regret Me" Released: January 25, 2023; 2. "Look at Us Now (Honeycomb)" Released: February 15, 2023

Aurora is a studio and soundtrack album released on March 1, 2023, by Atlantic Records to promote the Amazon Prime Video streaming television miniseries Daisy Jones & the Six, based on Taylor Jenkins Reid's 2019 novel of the same name. The 11-track album headlined by the fictional titular band featured songs with lead vocals performed by Riley Keough and Sam Claflin, with songs composed and produced by Blake Mills with additional music production by Tony Berg and co-production by Chris Weisman, Jackson Browne, Marcus Mumford, and Phoebe Bridgers. The soundtrack album is produced by Blake Mills, Kevin Weaver, Pete Ganbarg, Brandon Davis and Joseph Khoury.

The fictional album in the original novel was loosely based on Fleetwood Mac's eleventh studio album Rumours (1977). The cast rehearsed many of the songs at their homes during the COVID-19 pandemic lockdown. All the songs were recorded and mixed at the Sound City Studios in Los Angeles. The album received generally positive reviews for musical quality and conveying the essence of the fictional band as well as the music of the 1970s.

== Background ==
Series showrunner Taylor Jenkins Reid recruited Blake Mills to produce the album, along with fellow record producer Phoebe Bridgers and singer-songwriter Chris Weisman. "I'm not a musician. I hear something in my head, but it's not anything that anyone could make into a song," she said. "So the idea that people are going to create this album is incredibly exciting to me. I was meeting with one of the guys at Amazon, and we were talking about the music, and he was saying he was very daunted by the task of having to create the song 'Aurora'. He was like, 'You have made it out to be the greatest album of the 1970s!' And now he has to go figure out a way to make it. I'm just glad it's not my problem." According to Blake Mills, who was interviewed by Jonathan Bernstein of Rolling Stone in June 2020, "there's an opportunity to subvert and create a guitar personality that could have been present in the Seventies, and wasn't [...] People just loved guitar at that point. So I’m trying to find an appreciation for the instrument and try to bend it to my will a little bit."

== Release history ==
The album was announced on January 25, 2023, with the track list also being revealed. It was planned to be released on March 3, 2023, coinciding with the series. But the MP3 album released two days earlier than scheduled, whereas the physical form was released on vinyl by Ellemar Records (the fictional record label in the original novel) on March 2. The LP edition was issued as a two-sided 180-gram disc, on multicolored vinyl with variants such as orange, blue translucent, yellow translucent, and teal. The latter was released as a special edition through Barnes & Noble retailers.

== Singles ==
The album was led by the first single "Regret Me" released on the same day as the album preview on January 25, 2023. The album was performed by Keough and Claflin along with Nicki Bluhm and James Petralli performing the background vocals. The second track "Look at Us Now (Honeycomb)" was released on February 15, 2023. Two versions of the song were released: a single edit that runs four minutes and 30 seconds, and a five-minute, thirty-two second longer version. Mumford subsequently released his own version of "Look at Us Now" alongside Maren Morris.

== Reception ==
=== Critical response ===
Professional ratings
Review scores
Source	Rating
AllMusic	3/5 stars
Beyond the Stage	7/10
The Line of Best Fit	7/10
Pitchfork	6.6/10
The Times	4/5 stars

Writing for Pitchfork, Pete Tosiello scored the album 6.6 out of 10 and wrote "Aurora is the soft-rock holy grail, an achievement that transforms American music and rends its creators in the process. The series is burdened by the same strictures as folk musicals Begin Again and Juliet, Naked, not to mention low-prestige cable dramas Vinyl and Dave: In dramatizing the creative process and the difficulty of genius, the work becomes secondary. Logistically, a narrative hinging on transcendent music is undone when the songs are just pretty good. The album struggles to apprehend Fleetwood Mac's audacity, conflating a '70s rock pinnacle with easy-listening ballads. Aurora is bold only as far as tribute-band supergroups go." Tilly Pearce of Den of Geek summarized "for an album based on a TV show, Aurora has no right to be this dang good – full of earworm tracks that will remain in your head for ages."

Vicky Greer in her review for The Line of Best Fit gave 7/10 and wrote "Purists might be jarred by the fact that the series' version of Aurora bears little resemblance to the book, but don't let that put you off – this album captures all the magic and intensity created by Taylor Jenkins Reid." Cate Pasterchick of Beyond The Stage also rated the same and summarized, "While the album could never outdo its non-fictional equivalents, Aurora serves its purpose of emulating the greats. Aurora is nostalgic, but it's not the heart and soul of 70s music. That kind of magnetism can only be found in the original era. With that being said, Daisy Jones & The Six's one and only album beautifully immortalizes the beloved book." Will Hodgkinson of The Times stated, "For a Seventies band who never existed, this is pretty authentic". Marcy Donelson of AllMusic wrote: "In the end, while Aurora plays out more like a cast album than unearthed period vinyl, it does hover on the spectrum, and the actor/musicians come to play while songs suggest the intended period Los Angeles music scene, if they rarely stand strong enough on their own to create their own legend."

=== Accolades ===
Year	Award	Category	Nominee(s)	Result	Ref.
2024	Grammy Awards	Best Compilation Soundtrack For Visual Media	AURORA	Nominated	

== Track listing ==
All tracks are produced by Blake Mills.

Aurora track listing
No.	Title	Writer(s)	Performer(s)/Artist(s)	Length
1.	"Aurora"	Blake Mills; Chris Weisman; Cass McCombs; Matt Sweeney	Riley Keough and Sam Claflin	3:25
2.	"Let Me Down Easy"	Z Berg; Ali Tamposi; James Valentine; Mills	Riley Keough and Sam Claflin; Background vocals: Z Berg	3:23
3.	"Kill You to Try"	Mills; Bobby Gruska; Ethan Gruska	Riley Keough, Sam Claflin, James Petralli and Nicki Bluhm	5:12
4.	"Two Against Three"	Mills	Riley Keough	3:51
5.	"Look at Us Now (Honeycomb)"	Mills; Jason Boesel; Stephony Smith; Jonathan Rice; Marcus Mumford	Riley Keough and Sam Claflin; Background vocals: Blake Mills and Madison Cunningham	5:32
6.	"Regret Me"	Mills; Weisman	Riley Keough and Sam Claflin; Background vocals: Nicki Bluhm and James Petralli	3:16
7.	"You Were Gone"	Mills; Weisman	Riley Keough and Sam Claflin; Background vocals: James Petralli and Z Berg	4:18
8.	"More Fun to Miss"	Mills; Sweeney	Riley Keough and Sam Claflin	2:53
9.	"Please"	Mills; Weisman	Sam Claflin; Background vocals: James Petralli and Nicki Bluhm	3:24
10.	"The River"	Mills; Berg; Joe Keefe; Kayslee Collins	Riley Keough and Sam Claflin; Background vocals: Blake Mills and Z Berg	4:54
11.	"No Words"	Mills	Riley Keough and Sam Claflin; Background vocals: James Petralli and Nicki Bluhm	4:16
Total length:				44:28

Bonus version
No.	Title	Writer(s)	Performer(s)/Artist(s)	Length
12.	"Look at Us Now (Honeycomb)" (single version)	Mills; Boesel; Smith; Rice; Mumford	Sam Claflin	4:30
Total length:				48:58

== Personnel ==
- Blake Mills – music production, mixing
- Tony Berg – additional music production
- Chris Weisman – additional music production
- Jackson Browne – additional music production
- Marcus Mumford – additional music production
- Phoebe Bridgers – additional music production
- Scott Neustadter – liner notes
- Taylor Jenkins Reid – liner notes
- Will Maclellan – additional recording
- Joseph Lorge – recording, mixing
- Greg Koller – mastering
- Ashley Strumwasser – executive producer
- Brad Mendelsohn – executive producer
- Frankie Pine – executive producer
- Lauren Neustadter – executive producer
- Will Graham – executive producer
- Brandon Davis – soundtrack album producer
- Joseph Khoury – soundtrack album producer
- Kevin Weaver – soundtrack album producer
- Pete Ganbarg – soundtrack album producer

== Charts ==
=== Weekly charts ===
Weekly chart performance for Aurora
Chart (2023)	Peak position
Australian Albums (ARIA)	42
Austrian Albums (Ö3 Austria)	30
Belgian Albums (Ultratop Flanders)	94
Belgian Albums (Ultratop Wallonia)	109
Canadian Albums (Billboard)	65
French Albums (SNEP)	198
German Albums (Offizielle Top 100)	60
Hungarian Albums (MAHASZ)	17
Irish Albums (IRMA)	31
New Zealand Albums (RMNZ)	27
Spanish Albums (Promusicae)	48
UK Albums (Official Charts)	26
US Billboard 200	47
US Americana/Folk Albums (Billboard)	2
US Top Rock Albums (Billboard)	7
US Top Soundtracks (Billboard)	1

=== Year-end charts ===
Year-end chart performance for Aurora
Chart (2023)	Position
US Top Rock Albums (Billboard)	48

== Certifications ==
Certifications for Aurora
Region	Certification	Certified units/sales
United Kingdom (BPI)	Silver	60,000^{‡}
^{‡} Sales+streaming figures based on certification alone.
