= Gary Calamar =

American film and television music supervisor

Gary Calamar is an American film and television music supervisor, who has been nominated five times for the Grammy Awards. Calamar's notable credits include The Man In The High Castle, Six Feet Under, True Blood, House, Weeds, Entourage, Dexter, and Varsity Blues. He also hosted a long-running program on the radio station KCRW in Santa Monica, before moving to 88.5 KCSN in September 2018. Calamar is also a songwriter and recording artist.

== Early life ==
Born in the Bronx and raised in Yonkers, NY, Calamar developed an interest with music and radio by listening to WNEW-FM. He told journalist Tony Pierce in a 2007 interview: "I …was the kid who kept a transistor radio under his pillow. I was a big fan of WNEW-FM and their amazing staff of DJ's. I remember Scott Muni, Pete Fornatelle, Allison Steel 'The Night Bird' and Dave Herman. I was listening when John Lennon surprised Dennis Elsas on the air and guest DJ'd."

== Career ==
Calamar moved to Los Angeles in the early 1980s. His interest in music eventually led him to manage Los Angeles-area boutique record stores Licorice Pizza, Moby Disc and Rhino Records. It was at Licorice Pizza that he met musician Jeff Davis. Calamar was enlisted to manage Davis' band, The Balancing Act, who went on to release three critically acclaimed albums on IRS Records.

=== KCRW ===
Calamar volunteered in the music library of the NPR station KCRW in the early 1990s, opening mail and filing CDs, eventually becoming a presenter. He described his transition from volunteer to DJ to Tony Pierce: "I got to know Chris Douridas who was music director and host of Morning Becomes Eclectic at the time. One day he casually mentioned that they were looking for a Saturday-Sunday overnight DJ... I dropped to my knees and begged Chris to give me a shot...and he did."

Calamar's Sunday night radio program (known as The Open Road until a KCRW policy change in 2008 eliminated music show names) featured a blend of contemporary and classic rock, pop, and folk music. He called it "adventurous pop music both timely and timeless". He conducted on-air interviews with musical figures including Brian Wilson, Lucinda Williams, Jeff Tweedy from Wilco, Wayne Coyne from The Flaming Lips as well as film composers Elmer Bernstein, Thomas Newman, Lalo Schifrin and Danny Elfman. Calamar's last show on KCRW was Sunday, September 23, 2018.

=== KCSN ===
On October 7, 2018, Calamar debuted his Sunday afternoon show, The Open Road, on 885 The SoCal Sound (KCSN) playing his signature sounds of "Adventurous Pop Music both timely and timeless"

=== Music supervision ===
Calamar cites the 1998 film Slums Of Beverly Hills as his first major break in the world of music supervision. The following year he co-supervised the number one hit movie Varsity Blues.

In 2001, he and then-professional-partner Thomas Golubić worked on an HBO series called Six Feet Under, created by American Beauty screenwriter Alan Ball. For the series, Calamar and Golubic were nominated for Grammy Awards for volumes 1 and 2 of the Six Feet Under soundtracks that they produced.

In 2006, Calamar founded Go Music to manage his various music supervision projects.

The success of Six Feet Under brought Calamar recognition as a music supervisor, leading to his work on television shows The Man In The High Castle, House, True Blood, Dexter, Weeds, and Entourage. "Somebody Somewhere" (HBO) and began work on "3 Body Problem" (Netflix) in 2024.

Calamar produced four soundtrack albums for the Alan Ball HBO series, True Blood (a vampire drama set in Northern Louisiana), which led to Grammy Award nominations in 2010, 2011, and 2013 for "Best Soundtrack Compilation."

In 2010 and 2011, Gary Calamar was honored as “Music Supervisor Of The Year (Television)” by the Guild Of Music Supervisors.

=== Songwriter and Recording Artist ===
“Gary’s songs are idiosyncratic gems. They’re reverent to great pop and classic rock but they have a spark of originality that is all Gary. They’re witty, catchy & fun and are a breath of fresh air.” – Michael Shelley (WFMU)

In the fall of 2014 Atlantic Records released Calamar's debut ep; "You Are What You Listen To."

Calamar followed up with the single “Looking For A Job” / Anti-Social, Young American Christmas Lovers Brigade” (2015), and “Little Tokyo / “Prince of Pico Blvd.” (2017), "Forgive Yourself" (2020), "Rough Patch (2023) and "Distractions" (2025).

Gary Calamar's new album, "ODD NUMB3RS and SLANTED RHYMES will be released October 2026 on Big Stir Records. The album is a compilation of his previous released singles with 3 new tracks and features Devo's Mark Mothersbaugh on "I Got An Idea" and Robyn Hitchcock on "Who Are We Gonna Be Today."

=== Record Store Days ===
In 2010, Calamar's first book was published by Sterling Publishing -- Record Store Days: From Vinyl to Digital and Back Again—co-authored by music journalist Phil Gallo. The book featured a foreword by R.E.M.'s Peter Buck and tells the story of the development of record stores.

== Personal life ==
Calamar lives with his wife and daughter in Los Angeles, California.
