= Stephane Wrembel =

French jazz guitarist

Stéphane Wrembel
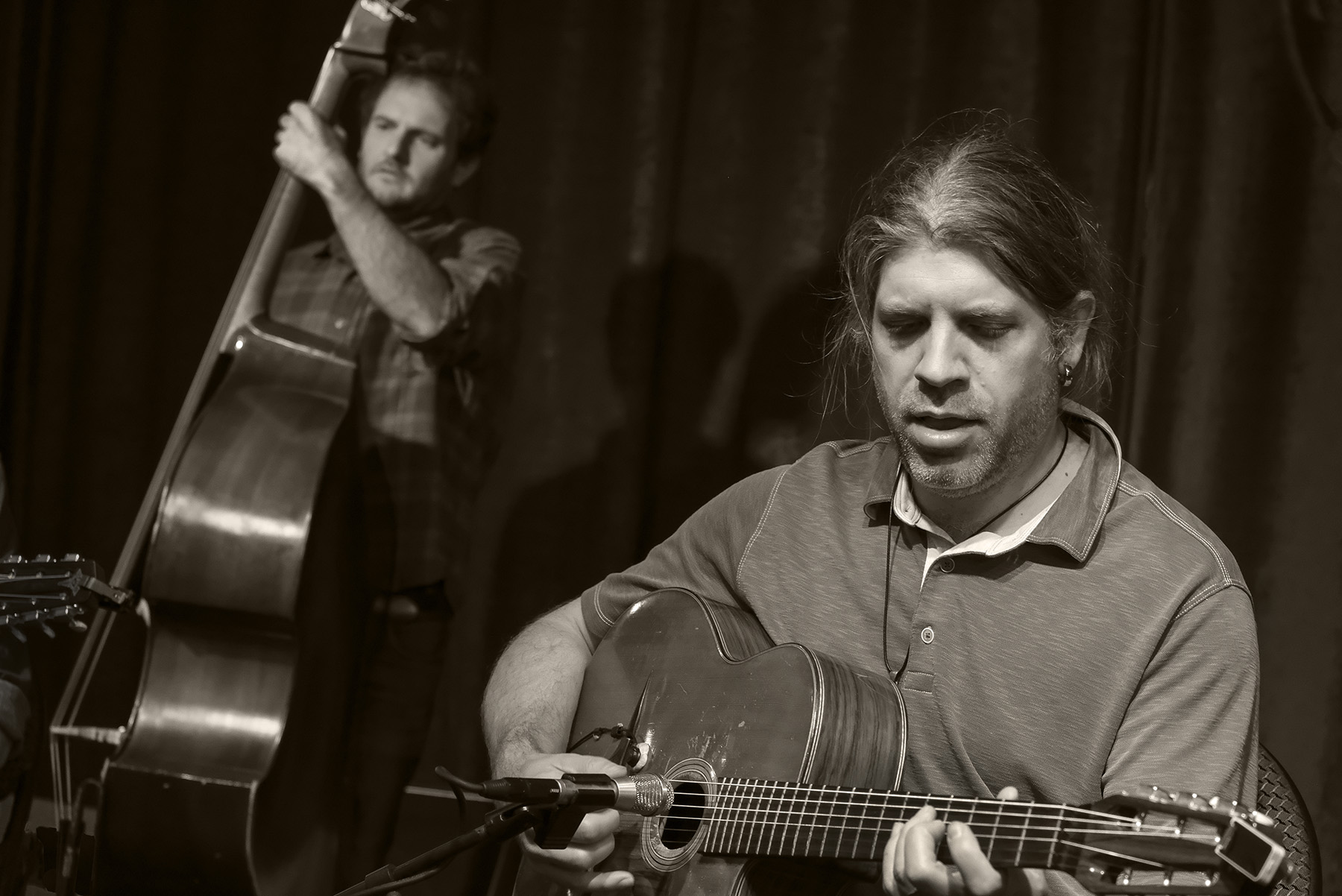
- Stéphane Wrembel, Lovin' Cup (Rochester NY) by Bruno Chalifour, 2017.

Background information
- Born: February 27, 1974 (age 52); Paris, France
- Genres: Gypsy jazz, world music
- Occupation: Musician
- Instrument: Guitar
- Years active: 2002–present
- Website: stephanewrembel.com

Stéphane Wrembel is a French jazz guitarist. Wrembel performs Gypsy jazz but is also influenced by world music.

Wrembel studied classical piano from age four in Fontainebleau, France, winning prizes in the Lucien Wurmser competition and at the National Conservatory of Aubervilliers, before taking up the guitar at age sixteen "to learn Pink Floyd songs, Led Zeppelin, old Genesis, and all that stuff."

While attending the American School of Modern Music in Paris, Wrembel went to the Django Reinhardt Festival in Samois, France where he was inspired to study composition, arranging, jazz, and contemporary classical music. After graduation, Wrembel was awarded a scholarship to the Berklee College of Music.

His song "Big Brother" appeared on the soundtrack for Woody Allen's film Vicky Cristina Barcelona. In 2011 he again collaborated with Allen, composing "Bistro Fada", the theme song for Allen's film Midnight in Paris.

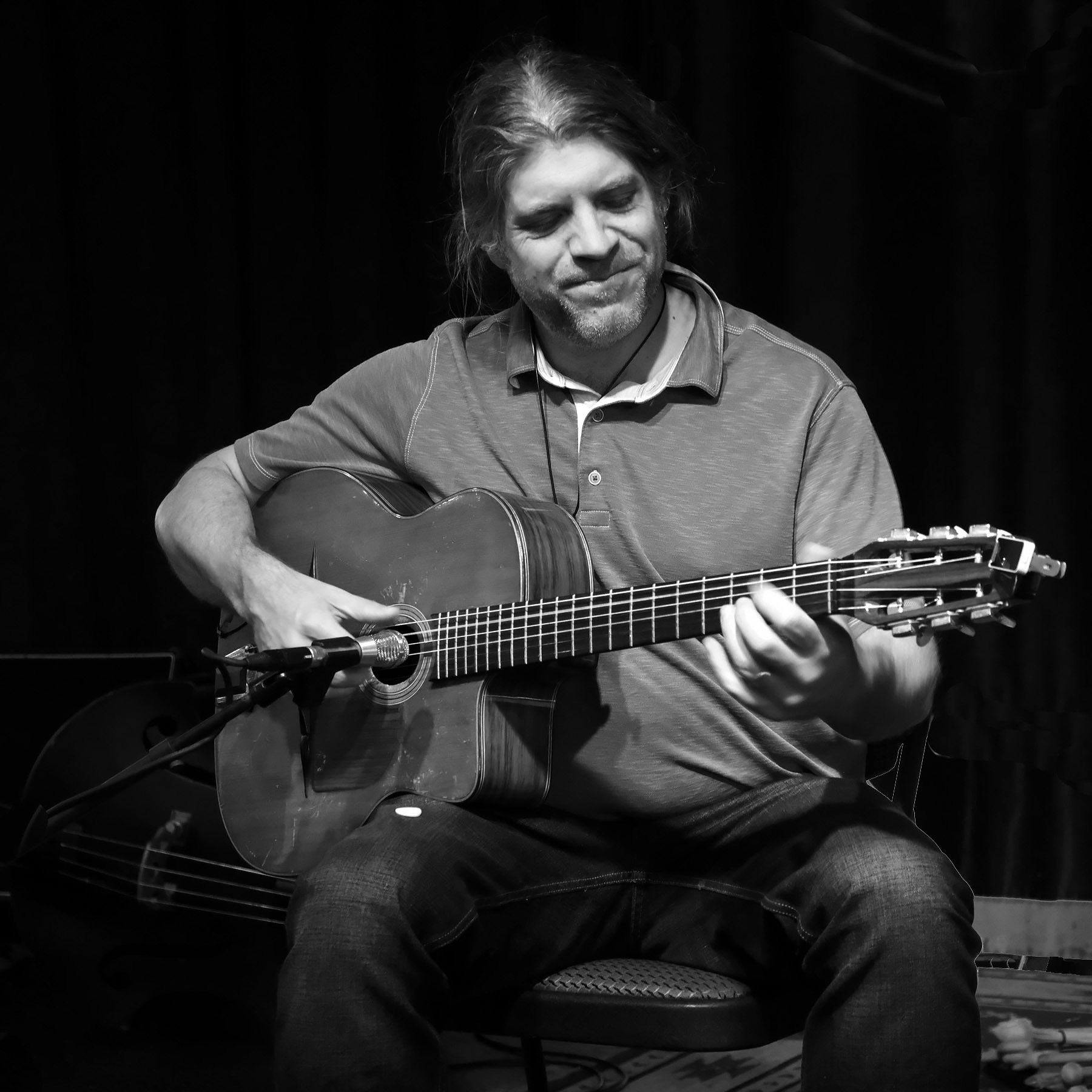
Stéphane Wrembel. Photo Bruno Chalifour, 2017.

== Discography ==
- Gypsy Rumble with David Grisman (Amoeba, 2005)
- Terre Des Hommes (Water Is Life, 2008)
- Introducing 2001–2010 (Water Is Life, 2010)
- Origins (Water Is Life, 2012)
- Dreamers of Dreams (Water Is Life, 2014)
- The Django Experiment: Live in Rochester (Water Is Life, 2016)
- Live in India (Water Is Life, 2016)
- The Django Experiment I (Water Is Life, 2017)
- The Django Experiment II (Water Is Life, 2017)
- The Django Experiment III (Water Is Life, 2018)
- The Django Experiment IV (Water Is Life, 2019)
- Django L'Impressionniste (Water Is Life, 2019)
- The Django Experiment V (Water Is Life, 2020)
- Django New Orleans (Water Is Life, 2023)

== Bibliography ==
- Getting into Gypsy Jazz Guitar, 2004
