= Midnight in Paris =

2011 film by Woody Allen

- Theatrical release poster
- Directed by: Woody Allen
- Written by: Woody Allen
- Produced by: Letty Aronson; Stephen Tenenbaum; Jaume Roures
- Starring: Kathy Bates; Adrien Brody; Carla Bruni; Marion Cotillard; Rachel McAdams; Michael Sheen; Owen Wilson
- Cinematography: Darius Khondji
- Edited by: Alisa Lepselter
- Production companies: Gravier Productions; Mediapro; Televisió de Catalunya (TV3); Versátil Cinema
- Distributed by: Sony Pictures Classics (United States); Alta Films (Spain)
- Release dates: May 11, 2011 (Cannes); May 13, 2011 (Spain); May 20, 2011 (United States)
- Running time: 94 minutes
- Countries: United States; Spain
- Language: English
- Budget: $17 million
- Box office: $151.7 million

Midnight in Paris is a 2011 fantasy comedy film written and directed by Woody Allen. Set in Paris, the film follows Gil Pender (Owen Wilson), a screenwriter and aspiring novelist, who is forced to confront the shortcomings of his relationship with his materialistic fiancée (Rachel McAdams) and their divergent goals, which become increasingly exaggerated as he travels back in time to the 1920s each night at midnight.

Produced by the Spanish group Mediapro and Allen's US-based Gravier Productions, the film stars Wilson, McAdams, Kathy Bates, Adrien Brody, Carla Bruni, Tom Hiddleston, Corey Stoll, Alison Pill, Kurt Fuller, Mimi Kennedy, Lea Seydoux, Marion Cotillard, and Michael Sheen. It premiered at the 2011 Cannes Film Festival and was released in the United States on May 20, 2011. The film opened to critical acclaim. In 2012, it won the Academy Award for Best Original Screenplay and the Golden Globe Award for Best Screenplay. It was nominated for three other Academy Awards: Best Picture, Best Director and Best Art Direction.

== Plot ==
In 2010, disillusioned screenwriter Gil Pender and his fiancée, Inez, vacation in Paris with Inez's wealthy parents. Gil, struggling to finish his debut novel about a man who works in a nostalgia shop, finds himself drawn to the artistic history of Paris, especially the Lost Generation of the 1920s, and has ambitions to move there, which Inez dismisses. By chance, they meet Inez's old college friend, Paul, and his wife, Carol. Paul speaks with great authority but questionable accuracy on French history, annoying Gil but impressing Inez.

Intoxicated after a night of wine tasting, Gil decides to walk back to their hotel, while Inez goes with Paul and Carol by taxi. At midnight, a 1920s car pulls up beside Gil and delivers him to a party for Jean Cocteau, attended by other people of the 1920s Paris art scene. Zelda Fitzgerald, bored, encourages her husband Scott and Gil to leave with her. They head to a cafe where they run into Ernest Hemingway and Juan Belmonte. After Zelda and Scott leave, Gil and Hemingway discuss writing, and Hemingway offers to show Gil's novel to Gertrude Stein. As Gil leaves to fetch his manuscript, he returns to 2010 only to find a laundromat in the cafe's location.

The next night, Gil tries to repeat the experience, this time bringing Inez along, but she returns to the hotel before midnight. Subsequently returning to the 1920s, he accompanies Hemingway to visit Gertrude Stein, who is critiquing Pablo Picasso's new painting of his lover Adriana. Gil becomes drawn to Adriana, a costume designer who also had affairs with Amedeo Modigliani and Georges Braque. Having heard the first line of Gil's novel, Adriana praises it and admits she has always longed for the past.

Inez grows jaded with Paris and Gil's continual disappearances, while her father grows suspicious and hires a private detective to follow him.

Gil continues to time-travel the following nights. Adriana leaves Picasso and continues to bond with Gil, who is conflicted by his attraction to her. Gil explains his situation to Salvador Dalí, Man Ray, and Luis Buñuel; as surrealists, they do not question his claim of coming from the future. Gil later suggests the plot of The Exterminating Angel to Buñuel.

Back in the present, Gil meets Gabrielle, an antique dealer and fellow admirer of the Lost Generation. Later at a book stall he finds Adriana's diary, which reveals that she had been in love with Gil and dreamed of being gifted earrings before having sex with him. Planning to seduce Adriana, Gil plans to take a pair of Inez's earrings but is thwarted by her early return to the hotel room.

Gil instead buys new earrings, giving them to Adriana after returning again to the past. Later, a horse-drawn carriage appears and transports them to the Belle Époque, an era Adriana considers Paris's Golden Age. They go to the Moulin Rouge where they meet Henri de Toulouse-Lautrec, Paul Gauguin, and Edgar Degas, who all agree that Paris's best era was the Renaissance. Adriana is offered a job designing ballet costumes; thrilled, she proposes to Gil that they stay. But he, observing the unhappiness of Adriana and the other artists, realizes that chasing nostalgia is fruitless because the present is always "a little unsatisfying." Adriana decides to stay, and they part ways. Meanwhile, the detective following Gil takes a "wrong turn" and ends up being chased by the palace guards of Louis XVI just before a revolution breaks out.

Gil rewrites the first two chapters of his novel and gives his draft to Stein, who praises his rewrite. Still, Hemingway says that on reading the new chapters he does not believe that the protagonist does not realize that his fiancée (based on Inez) is having an affair with the character based on Paul. Gil returns to 2010 and confronts Inez, who admits to having sex with Paul but regarded it as a meaningless fling. Gil breaks up with her and decides to stay in Paris.

While walking by the Seine at midnight, no carriage comes by but Gil encounters Gabrielle. As it begins to rain, he offers to walk her home and learns that they share a love for Paris in the rain.

== Cast ==
Main cast

- Owen Wilson as Gil Pender
- Rachel McAdams as Inez
- Marion Cotillard as Adriana, fictionalized mistress of Picasso
- Tom Hiddleston as F. Scott Fitzgerald
- Alison Pill as Zelda Fitzgerald
- Corey Stoll as Ernest Hemingway
- Adrien Brody as Salvador Dalí
- Kathy Bates as Gertrude Stein
- Michael Sheen as Paul Bates
- Nina Arianda as Carol Bates
- Carla Bruni as Museum guide
- Kurt Fuller as John, Inez's father
- Mimi Kennedy as Helen, Inez's mother
- Léa Seydoux as Gabrielle

Supporting cast

- Yves Heck as Cole Porter
- Sonia Rolland as Josephine Baker
- Daniel Lundh as Juan Belmonte
- Thérèse Bourou-Rubinsztein as Alice B. Toklas
- Marcial Di Fonzo Bo as Pablo Picasso
- Emmanuelle Uzan as Djuna Barnes
- Tom Cordier as Man Ray
- Adrien de Van as Luis Buñuel
- Serge Bagdassarian as Detective Duluc
- Gad Elmaleh as Detective Tisserant
- David Lowe as T. S. Eliot
- Yves-Antoine Spoto as Henri Matisse
- Laurent Claret as Leo Stein
- Vincent Menjou Cortes as Henri de Toulouse-Lautrec
- Olivier Rabourdin as Paul Gauguin
- François Rostain as Edgar Degas
- Karine Vanasse as Belle Époque woman
- Michel Vuillermoz as King in Versailles
- Catherine Benguigui as Maxim's Hostess
- Audrey Fleurot as Partygoer
- Guillaume Gouix as Partygoer

=== Notes on the cast ===
Owen is a natural actor. He doesn't sound like he's acting, he sounds like a human being speaking in a situation, and that's very appealing to me. He's got a wonderful funny bone, a wonderful comic instinct that's quite unlike my own, but wonderful of its kind. He's a blond Texan kind of Everyman's hero, the kind of hero of the regiment in the old war pictures, with a great flair for being amusing. It's a rare combination and I thought he'd be great.

— Woody Allen, in production notes about the film

This is the second time McAdams and Wilson co-starred as a couple; they did so before in 2005's Wedding Crashers. In comparing the two roles, McAdams describes the one in Midnight in Paris as being far more antagonistic than the role in Wedding Crashers. Allen had high praise for her performance and that of co-star Marion Cotillard. Cotillard was cast as Wilson's other love interest, the charismatic Adriana.

Carla Bruni, singer-songwriter and wife of former French president Nicolas Sarkozy, was recruited by Allen for a role as a museum guide. There were false reports that Allen re-filmed Bruni's scenes with Léa Seydoux, but Seydoux rebuffed these rumors revealing she had an entirely separate role in the film. Allen also shot down reports that a scene with Bruni required over 30 takes: "I am appalled. I read these things and I could not believe my eyes ... These are not exaggerations, but inventions from scratch. There is absolutely no truth." He continued to describe Bruni as "very professional" and insisted he was pleased with her scenes, stating that "every frame will appear in the film."

== Production ==
=== Writing ===
Allen employed a reverse approach in writing the screenplay for this film, by building the film's plot around a conceived movie title, 'Midnight in Paris'. The time-travel portions of Allen's storyline are evocative of the Paris of the 1920s described in Ernest Hemingway's 1964 posthumously published memoir A Moveable Feast, with Allen's characters interacting with the likes of Hemingway, Gertrude Stein, and F. Scott and Zelda Fitzgerald, and using the phrase "a moveable feast" in two instances, with a copy of the book appearing in one scene.

Allen originally wrote the character Gil as an East Coast intellectual, but he rethought it when he and casting director Juliet Taylor began considering Owen Wilson for the role. "I thought Owen would be charming and funny but my fear was that he was not so Eastern at all in his persona," says Allen, who realized that making Gil a Californian would actually make the character richer, so he rewrote the part and submitted it to Wilson, who readily agreed to do it. Allen describes him as "a natural actor". The set-up has certain plot points in common with the 1990s British sitcom Goodnight Sweetheart.

=== Filming ===
Principal photography began in Paris in July 2010. Allen states that the fundamental aesthetic for the camera work was to give the film a warm ambiance. He describes that he likes the cinematography "intensely red, intensely warm because if you go to a restaurant and you're there with your wife or your girlfriend, and it's got red-flecked wallpaper and turn-of-the-century lights, you both look beautiful. Whereas if you're in a seafood restaurant and the lights are up, everybody looks terrible. So it looks nice. It's very flattering and very lovely." To achieve this he and his cinematographer, Darius Khondji, used primarily warm colours in the film's photography, filmed in flatter weather and employed limited camera movements, in attempts to draw little attention to the cinematography. This is the first Woody Allen film to go through a digital intermediate, instead of being color timed in the traditional photochemical way. According to Allen, its use here is a test to see if he likes it enough to use in his future films.

Allen's directorial style placed more emphasis on the romantic and realistic elements of the film than the fantasy elements. He states that he "was interested only in this romantic tale, and anything that contributed to it that was fairytale was right for me. I didn't want to get into it. I only wanted to get into what bore down on his (Owen Wilson's) relationship with Marion."

==== Locations ====
The film opens with a 3 1/2-minute postcard-view montage of Paris, showing some of the iconic tourist sites. Kenneth Turan of the Los Angeles Times describes the montage as a stylistic approach that lasts longer than necessary to simply establish location. According to Turan, "Allen is saying: Pay attention – this is a special place, a place where magic can happen."

Midnight in Paris is the first Woody Allen film shot entirely on location in Paris, though both Love and Death (1975) and Everyone Says I Love You (1996) were partially filmed there. Filming locations include Giverny, John XXIII Square (near Notre Dame), Montmartre, Deyrolle, the Palace of Versailles, the Opéra, Pont Alexandre III, the Sacré-Cœur, the Île de la Cité itself, and streets near the Panthéon.

== Marketing ==
The Sony Classics team decided to take a lemon and make lemonade. They obtained a list of reporters who were invited to the Cars 2 junket and sent them press notes from Midnight in Paris, encouraging them to ask Wilson questions about the Allen film during the Pixar media day. Wilson happily complied, answering queries about his character in Paris that provided material for a host of stories. Sony Classics also got a hold of Wilson's schedule of TV appearances to promote Cars 2 on shows like Late Show with David Letterman, then bought ad time for Paris spots on the nights when Wilson was a guest.

— Patrick Goldstein, Los Angeles Times

The film is co-produced by Allen's Gravier Productions and the Catalan company Mediapro and was picked up by Sony Pictures Classics for distribution. It is the fourth film the two companies have co-produced, the others being Sweet and Lowdown, Whatever Works, and You Will Meet a Tall Dark Stranger. The film's poster is a reference to Vincent van Gogh's 1889 painting The Starry Night.

In promoting the film, Allen was willing to do only a limited amount of publicity at its Cannes Film Festival debut in May. Wilson was already committed to promoting Pixar's Cars 2, which opened in late June, several weeks after Allen's film arrived in cinemas. Due to these challenges and the relatively small ($10 million) budget for promotion, Sony Classics had to perform careful media buying and press relations to promote the film.

== Release ==
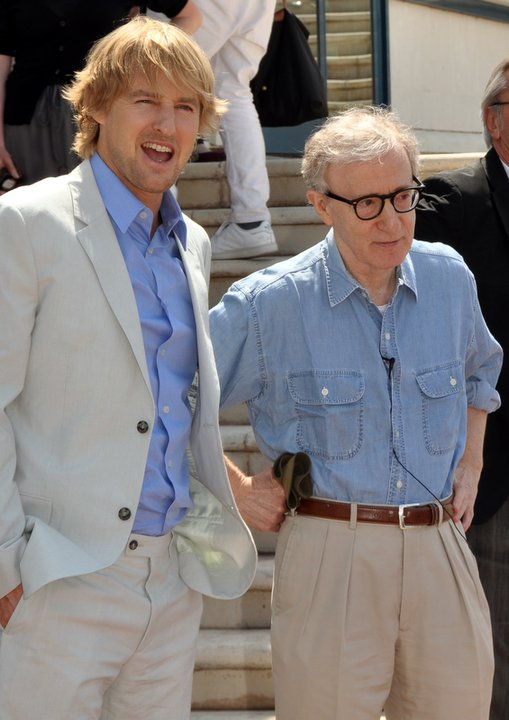
Owen Wilson and Woody Allen promoting the film at the 2011 Cannes Film Festival.

=== Box office ===
The film premiered at the Cannes Film Festival on May 11, 2011, when it opened the festival as first screening for both professionals and the public; it was released nationwide in France that same day, Wednesday being the traditional day of change in French cinemas. It went on limited release in six theaters in the United States on May 20 and took $599,003 in the first weekend, spreading to 944 cinemas three weeks later, when it went on wide release.

Midnight in Paris achieved the highest gross of any of Allen's films in North America, before adjusting for inflation. The film earned $56.3 million in North America, overtaking his previous best, Hannah and Her Sisters, at $40 million. As of 2016, Midnight in Paris was the highest-grossing film directed by Allen, with $151 million worldwide on a $17 million budget.

=== Critical reception ===
Midnight in Paris received critical acclaim. On Rotten Tomatoes, the film holds an approval rating of 93% based on 224 reviews, with an average rating of 7.8/10. The website's critics consensus reads, "It may not boast the depth of his classic films, but the sweetly sentimental Midnight in Paris is funny and charming enough to satisfy Woody Allen fans." The film has received Allen's best reviews and score on the site since 1994's Bullets Over Broadway. On Metacritic, the film has a score of 81 out of 100, based on 40 reviews, indicating "universal acclaim". The film received some generally positive reviews after its premiere at the 64th Cannes Film Festival. Todd McCarthy from The Hollywood Reporter praised Darius Khondji's cinematography and claimed the film "has the concision and snappy pace of Allen's best work".

A. O. Scott of The New York Times commented on Owen Wilson's success at playing the Woody Allen persona. He states that the film is marvelously romantic and credibly blends "whimsy and wisdom". He praised Khondji's cinematography, the supporting cast and remarked that it is a memorable film and that "Mr. Allen has often said that he does not want or expect his own work to survive, but as modest and lighthearted as Midnight in Paris is, it suggests otherwise: Not an ambition toward immortality so much as a willingness to leave something behind—a bit of memorabilia, or art, if you like that word better—that catches the attention and solicits the admiration of lonely wanderers in some future time." Roger Ebert gave the film 3 1/2 stars out of 4. He ended his review thus:

This is Woody Allen's 41st film. He writes his films himself and directs them with wit and grace. I consider him a treasure of the cinema. Some people take him for granted, although Midnight in Paris reportedly charmed even the jaded veterans of the Cannes press screenings. There is nothing to dislike about it. Either you connect with it or not. I'm wearying of movies that are for "everybody" – which means, nobody in particular. Midnight in Paris is for me, in particular, and that's just fine with moi.

Richard Roeper, an American film critic, gave Midnight in Paris an "A"; referring to it as a "wonderful film" and "one of the best romantic comedies in recent years". He commented that the actors are uniformly brilliant and praised the film's use of witty one-liners. In The Huffington Post, Rob Kirkpatrick said the film represented a return to form for the director ("it's as if Woody has rediscovered Woody") and called Midnight in Paris "a surprising film that casts a spell over us and reminds us of the magical properties of cinema, and especially of Woody Allen's cinema."

Midnight in Paris has been compared to Allen's The Purple Rose of Cairo (1985), in that the functioning of the magical realism therein is never explained. David Edelstein, New York, commended that approach, stating that it eliminates "the sci-fi wheels and pulleys that tend to suck up so much screen time in time-travel movies." He goes on to applaud the film stating that, "this supernatural comedy isn't just Allen's best film in more than a decade; it's the only one that manages to rise above its tidy parable structure and be easy, graceful, and glancingly funny, as if buoyed by its befuddled hero's enchantment."

Peter Johnson of PopCitizen felt that the film's nature as a "period piece" was far superior to its comedic components, which he referred to as lacking. "While the period settings of Midnight in Paris are almost worth seeing the film ... it hardly qualifies as a moral compass to those lost in a nostalgic revelry," he asserts.

Joe Morgenstern of The Wall Street Journal acknowledged the cast and the look of the film and, despite some familiarities with the film's conflict, praised Allen's work on the film. He wrote, "For the filmmaker who brought these intertwined universes into being, the film represents new energy in a remarkable career."

Peter Bradshaw of The Guardian, giving the film 3 out of 5 stars, described it as "an amiable amuse-bouche" and "sporadically entertaining, light, shallow, self-plagiarising." He goes on to add that it's "a romantic fantasy adventure to be compared with the vastly superior ideas of his comparative youth, such as the 1985 movie The Purple Rose of Cairo." In October 2013, the film was voted by the Guardian readers as the ninth best film directed by Woody Allen.

More scathing is Richard Corliss of Time, who describes the film as "pure Woody Allen. Which is not to say great or even good Woody, but a distillation of the filmmaker's passions and crotchets, and of his tendency to pass draconian judgment on characters the audience is not supposed to like. ... his Midnight strikes not sublime chimes but the clangor of snap judgments and frayed fantasy."

Quentin Tarantino named Midnight in Paris as his favorite film of 2011. The film was well received in France. The website Allocine (Hello Cinema) gave it 4.2 out of 5 stars based on a sample of twenty reviews. Ten of the reviews gave it a full five stars, including Le Figaro, which praised the film's evocation of its themes and said "one leaves the screening with a smile on one's lips".

In 2021, members of Writers Guild of America West (WGAW) and Writers Guild of America, East (WGAE) voted its screenplay 83rd in WGA’s 101 Greatest Screenplays of the 21st Century (so far). In 2025, it was one of the films voted for the "Readers' Choice" edition of The New York Times' list of "The 100 Best Movies of the 21st Century," finishing at number 189.

=== Faulkner estate ===
The William Faulkner estate later filed a lawsuit against Sony Pictures Classics for the film's bit of dialogue, "The past is not dead. Actually, it's not even past," a paraphrasing of an often-quoted line from Faulkner's 1950 book Requiem for a Nun ("The past is never dead. It's not even past."), claiming that the paraphrasing was an unlicensed use of the estate. Faulkner is directly credited in the dialogue when Gil claims to have met the writer at a dinner party (though Faulkner is never physically portrayed in the film). Julie Ahrens of the Fair Use Project at the Stanford University's Center for Internet and Society was quoted as saying in response to the charge, "The idea that one person can control the use of those particular words seems ridiculous to me. Any kind of literary allusion is ordinarily celebrated. This seems to squarely fall in that tradition." Sony's response stated that they consider the action "a frivolous lawsuit". In July 2013, a federal judge in Mississippi dismissed the lawsuit on fair use grounds.

=== Accolades ===
List of awards and nominations
Award	Category	Recipient(s)	Result
84th Academy Awards	Best Picture	Letty Aronson and Stephen Tenenbaum	Nominated
84th Academy Awards	Best Director	Woody Allen	Nominated
84th Academy Awards	Best Original Screenplay	Woody Allen	Won
84th Academy Awards	Best Art Direction	Production Design: Anne Seibel; Set Decoration: Hélène Dubreuil	Nominated
Alliance of Women Film Journalists	Best Film		Nominated
Alliance of Women Film Journalists	Best Director	Woody Allen	Nominated
Alliance of Women Film Journalists	Best Screenplay Original	Woody Allen	Won
Alliance of Women Film Journalists	Best Ensemble Cast		Nominated
Australian Academy of Cinema and Television Arts	Best Film – International		Nominated
Australian Academy of Cinema and Television Arts	Best Direction – International	Woody Allen	Nominated
Australian Academy of Cinema and Television Arts	Best Screenplay – International	Woody Allen	Nominated
65th British Academy Film Awards	BAFTA Award for Best Original Screenplay	Woody Allen	Nominated
Bradbury Award	Bradbury Award	Woody Allen	Nominated
British Fantasy Awards	British Fantasy Award for Best Screenplay	Woody Allen	Won
Broadcast Film Critics Association Awards	Best Picture		Nominated
Broadcast Film Critics Association Awards	Best Original Screenplay	Woody Allen	Won
Broadcast Film Critics Association Awards	Best Comedy		Nominated
Chicago Film Critics Association Awards	Best Original Screenplay	Woody Allen	Nominated
2012 Comedy Awards	Comedy Film		Nominated
2012 Comedy Awards	Comedy Actor	Owen Wilson	Nominated
2012 Comedy Awards	Comedy Director	Woody Allen	Nominated
2012 Comedy Awards	Comedy Screenplay	Woody Allen	Nominated
Directors Guild of America	Outstanding Directorial Achievement in Feature Film	Woody Allen	Nominated
69th Golden Globe Awards	Best Motion Picture – Musical or Comedy		Nominated
69th Golden Globe Awards	Best Director	Woody Allen	Nominated
69th Golden Globe Awards	Best Actor – Motion Picture Musical or Comedy	Owen Wilson	Nominated
69th Golden Globe Awards	Best Screenplay	Woody Allen	Won
Goya Awards
Goya Awards	Best Original Screenplay	Woody Allen	Nominated
Grammy Awards	Best Compilation Soundtrack For Visual Media		Won
Houston Film Critics Society Awards	Best Film		Nominated
Houston Film Critics Society Awards	Best Director	Woody Allen	Nominated
Houston Film Critics Society Awards	Best Screenplay	Woody Allen	Nominated
Independent Spirit Awards	Best Supporting Male	Corey Stoll	Nominated
Independent Spirit Awards	Best Cinematography	Darius Khondji	Nominated
National Society of Film Critics	Best Screenplay	Woody Allen	Nominated
New York Film Critics Online	Best Film		Nominated
Online Film Critics Society	Best Original Screenplay	Woody Allen	Won
Producers Guild of America Awards	Best Theatrical Motion Picture	Letty Aronson, Stephen Tenenbaum	Nominated
Satellite Awards	Best Film		Nominated
Satellite Awards	Best Director	Woody Allen	Nominated
Satellite Awards	Best Supporting Actress	Rachel McAdams	Nominated
Screen Actors Guild Awards	Outstanding Performance by a Cast in a Motion Picture		Nominated
Washington D.C. Area Film Critics Association	Best Director	Woody Allen	Nominated
Washington D.C. Area Film Critics Association	Best Original Screenplay	Woody Allen	Won
Writers Guild of America Awards	Original Screenplay	Woody Allen	Won
11th Grande Prêmio Brasileiro de Cinema	Best Foreign Film	Woody Allen	Won

=== Home media ===
The soundtrack was released on December 9, 2011, and released on Blu-ray and DVD on December 20, 2011.
