= Guild of Music Supervisors Award for Best Music Supervision for Films Budgeted Under $10 Million =

The Best Music Supervision for Films Budgeted Under $10 Million award is annually given by the Guild of Music Supervisors to honor the best music supervision in a film with a budget over 20 million dollars. It was first given at their fourth annual awards function, and has continued to be ever since, except for 2015, when the award was not given.

== Winners and nominees ==
=== 2010s ===
Year	Film	Music Supervisor(s)	Budget
2013	The Place Beyond the Pines	Gabe Hilfer	$15 Million
2013	The Bling Ring	Brian Reitzell	$8 Million
2013	Frances Ha	George Drakoulias	$3 Million
2013	The Spectacular Now	Gabe Hilfer & Season Kent	$2.5 Million
2013	Thanks for Sharing	Robin Urdang	N/A
2014	Begin Again	Matthew Sullivan and Andrea von Foerster	$8 Million
2014	Beyond the Lights	Julia Michels	$7 Million
2014	Jimi: All Is by My Side	Christopher Mollere	$5 Million
2016	20th Century Women	Howard Paar	$7 Million
2016	Boo! A Madea Halloween	Joel C. High	$20 Million
2016	The Edge of Seventeen	Jason Markey	$9 Million
2016	Middle School: The Worst Years of My Life	Dave Jordan & Jojo Villanueva	$8.5 Million
2016	Miles Ahead	Ed Gerrard	Less than $10 Million
2017	Before I Fall	Howard Paar	$5 Million
2017	Film Stars Don't Die in Liverpool	Ian Neil	$10 Million
2017	War on Everyone	Liz Gallacher	N/A
