= Guild of Music Supervisors Awards =

American film music awards ceremony

- Guild of Music Supervisors Awards logo
- Awarded for: Excellence in the craft of Music Supervision
- Country: United States
- Presented by: Guild of Music Supervisors
- First award: February 20, 2013; 13 years ago
- Website: GMSA Awards

The Guild of Music Supervisors Awards recognize music supervisors in 14 categories, representing movies, television, games and trailers. Compton, Carol and Furious 7 were among the winners of the 2016 ceremony, while La La Land of the 2017 ceremony. The seventh annual ceremony took place at The Theatre at the Ace Hotel Los Angeles.

== Ceremonies ==
Note

- all sources are from GMSA Awards

Edition	Date	Venue	Venue City
1st	February 13, 2011	N/A	N/A
2nd	February 9, 2012	N/A	N/A
3rd	February 20, 2013	N/A	N/A
4th	February 26, 2014	Mack Sennett Studios	Hollywood, CA
5th	January 21, 2015	Mack Sennett Studios	Hollywood, CA
6th	January 21, 2016	The Theatre at Ace Hotel	Los Angeles, CA
7th	February 16, 2017	The Theatre at Ace Hotel	Los Angeles, CA
8th	February 8, 2018	The Theatre at Ace Hotel	Los Angeles, CA
9th	February 13, 2019	The Theatre at Ace Hotel	Los Angeles, CA
10th	February 6, 2020	The Wiltern	Los Angeles, CA
11th	April 11, 2021	Virtual due to COVID	N/A
12th	March 20, 2022	Virtual due to COVID	N/A
13th	March 5, 2023	The Wiltern	Los Angeles, CA
14th	March 3, 2024	The Wiltern	Los Angeles, CA
15th	February 23, 2025	The Wiltern	Los Angeles, CA
16th	February 28, 2026	The Wiltern	Los Angeles, CA

== Categories ==
=== Film ===
- Best Music Supervision for Films Budgeted Over $25 Million
- Best Music Supervision for Films Budgeted Under $25 Million
- Best Music Supervision for Films Budgeted Under $10 Million
- Best Music Supervision for Films Budgeted Under $5 Million
- Best Song Written and/or Recorded for Film

=== Television ===
- Best Music Supervision in a Television Drama
- Best Music Supervision in a Television Comedy
- Best Music Supervision in Reality Television
- Best Music Supervision in a Television Limited Series or Movie
- Best Song Written and/or Recorded for Television

=== Video Games ===
- Best Music Supervision in a Video Game (Synch)
- Best Music Supervision in a Video Game (Original Music)

=== Documentary ===
- Best Music Supervision in a Documentary
- Best Music Supervision in a Docuseries

=== Advertising ===
- Best Music Supervision in an Advertising (Synch)
- Best Music Supervision in an Advertising (Original Music)

=== Trailers ===
- Best Music Supervision in a Trailer (Film)
- Best Music Supervision in a Trailer (Series)
- Best Music Supervision in a Trailer (Video Game & Interactive)

=== Retired Awards ===
- Best Use of Music by a Music House
- Best Use of Music by a Brand
- Best Music Supervision in a Docuseries or Reality Television
