= Fantasia 2000 (soundtrack) =

Fantasia 2000: An Original Walt Disney Records Soundtrack

Soundtrack album by Various artists
- Released: November 30, 1999
- Recorded: 1993–1996, 1999
- Studios: AIR Studios, London; Medinah Temple, Chicago
- Genre: Classical
- Length: 1:03:30
- Labels: Walt Disney (United States); Sony Classical (Worldwide)
- Producer: Chris Montan

Fantasia 2000: An Original Walt Disney Records Soundtrack is the soundtrack to Fantasia 2000, a sequel to the animated anthology film Fantasia (1940). It features eight individual tracks, each named after its corresponding segment in the film that was set to pieces of classical music. James Levine conducted six of the tracks for the film, which are performed by the Chicago Symphony Orchestra, while Rhapsody in Blue was originally conducted by Bruce Broughton for the film and The Sorcerer's Apperentice used the recording from the original 1940 film; these two tracks were conducted by Levine for the soundtrack. The album, released on November 30, 1999, by Walt Disney Records and Sony Classical Records, went on to reach the number one spot on the Billboard Top Classical Albums chart in July 2000.

== Background ==
Walt Disney initially planned to have Fantasia on continual release, replacing older classical segments featured in the film, with newer ones so that audiences would never see the same film twice, but was dropped following its box office failure and mixed critical response, with preliminary work on new segments were halted. After late-1980s, the sequel for the film was revived shortly after Michael Eisner became chief executive officer of The Walt Disney Company in 1984, when Walt's nephew, vice chairman Roy E. Disney, suggested it to him at a lunch. Disney once asked André Previn to work on a Fantasia film but Previn declined after he learned it was to feature songs by the Beatles rather than classical music, whereas Eisner approached Leonard Bernstein with the same idea, but while he seemed enthusiastic, Bernstein died before production began. After the 1990 reissue of the film was a success, and record pre-orders for the film's home video in 1991, Eisner greenlit the sequel for the film following public interest in the franchise. Disney and Walt Disney Feature Animation president Thomas Schumacher invited Metropolitan Opera conductor James Levine and manager Peter Gelb to a meeting in September 1991, following search of a suitable conductor. Disney recalled: "I asked James what his thought was on a three minute version of Beethoven's fifth symphony. He paused and went 'I think the right three minutes would be beautiful'".

== Recording ==
The music to The Sorcerer's Apprentice was already recorded on January 9, 1938, for the first film at Culver Studios, California with Leopold Stokowski conducting a group of session musicians. The Disney engineers collaborated with RCA Corporation for using multiple audio channels which allowed any desired dynamic balance to be achieved upon playback, and the stage was altered acoustically with double plywood semi-circular partitions that separated the orchestra into five sections to increase reverberation. Though as the production of Fantasia developed, the setup used for The Sorcerer's Apprentice was abandoned for different multi-channel recording arrangements. The recording of Rhapsody in Blue used in the film is an edited version of Ferde Grofé's orchestration of the piece performed by the Philharmonia Orchestra conducted by Bruce Broughton. The shortened version was made by cutting 125 bars of piano solo in three different places. A recording of James Levine conducting both pieces with the Philharmonia appears on the film's soundtrack.

The remaining six pieces were recorded at the Medinah Temple in Chicago, performed by the Chicago Symphony Orchestra conducted by Levine. Pines of Rome was re-arranged in 1993 by Bruce Coughlin, who reduced the four-movement piece by cutting the second movement and trimming sections of the third and fourth movements. The piece was recorded on March 28, 1994. The second recording involved Symphony No. 5, Carnival of the Animals, and Pomp and Circumstance, on April 25, 1994. Carnival of the Animals, Finale uses two pianos played by Gail Niwa and Philip Sabransky. Pomp and Circumstance was arranged by Peter Schickele and features the Chicago Symphony Chorus and soprano soloist Kathleen Battle. The next recording took place on April 24, 1995, for Piano Concerto No. 2 with pianist Yefim Bronfman. On September 28, 1996, The Firebird was the final piece to be recorded; its session lasted for three hours. The piece was arranged using four sections from Stravinsky's 1919 revision of the score.

== Release history ==
Walt Disney Records released 60,000 copies of a limited edition of the film's soundtrack on November 30, 1999, in the United States and internationally under the Sony Classical label. With a running time of 60 minutes, the album features Levine conducting the Philharmonia Orchestra on Rhapsody in Blue and The Sorcerer's Apprentice at AIR Studios in London, and the Chicago Symphony Orchestra for the remaining six tracks using the recordings from the Medinah Temple. The album was also released in digipak CDs, MiniDiscs and cassettes. A Fantasia 2000 Deluxe Read-Along cassette and CD followed which contains two tracks telling the stories of Pomp and Circumstance and The Sorcerer's Apprentice, with narration by Pat Carroll. Included in the set is a 44-page book containing some of the film's artwork.

== Track listing ==
No.	Title	Length
1.	"Symphony No. 5 (Beethoven)"	2:51
2.	"Pines of Rome (Respighi)"	10:18
3.	"Rhapsody in Blue (Gershwin)"	12:32
4.	"Piano Concerto No. 2, Allegro, Opus 102 (Shostakovich)"	7:22
5.	"Carnival of the Animals (Le Carnaval des Animaux), Finale (Saint-Saëns)"	1:54
6.	"The Sorcerer's Apprentice (Dukas)"	9:33
7.	"Pomp and Circumstance, Marches No. 1, 2, 3, & 4 (Elgar)"	6:18
8.	"Firebird Suite — 1919 Version (Stravinsky)"	9:11
Total length:		59:59

== Reception ==
=== Critical response ===
Heather Phares of AllMusic wrote that George Gershwin's "Rhapsody in Blue", Igor Stravinsky's "The Rite of Spring" and Edward Elgar's "Pomp and Circumstance" are "among the album's many high points", while works of classical composers such as Johann Sebastian Bach, Pyotr Ilyich Tchaikovsky, Camille Saint-Saëns and Ludwig van Beethoven "round out this classic, inspiring collection". Music critic John Herzog gave 5/5 saying "To Walt Disney, Fantasia is an ongoing thing, being updated every few years. With Fantasia 2000, the Disney animators have chosen some quality pieces of music. Let's hope that with the next Fantasia films to come, Disney will be able to use such wonderful cues as are to be found on the Fantasia 2000 album."

=== Accolades ===
Fantasia 2000's soundtrack received nomination for the Best Compilation Soundtrack Album for a Motion Picture, Television or other Visual Media at the 43rd Grammy Awards held in 2001. The award was lost to the soundtrack of Almost Famous (2000).

=== Charts ===
Chart (2000)	Peak position
Classical Albums (Billboard)	18

== Credits ==
Credits adapted from CD liner notes:

Segment	Personnel
Symphony No. 5 in C minor, I. Allegro con brio	Musical score: Symphony No. 5 in C minor, I. Allegro con brio by Ludwig van Beethoven (first movement only); Violinist: Itzhak Perlman
Pines of Rome	Musical score: Pines of Rome by Ottorino Respighi (abridged)
Rhapsody in Blue	Musical score: Rhapsody in Blue by George Gershwin; Performed by the Philharmonia Orchestra; Pianist: Ralph Grierson; Conductor: Bruce Broughton (soundtrack version conducted by James Levine)
Piano Concerto No. 2 in F Major, Allegro, Op. 102	Musical score: Piano Concerto No. 2 in F Major, Allegro, Op. 102 by Dmitri Shostakovich; Pianist: Yefim Bronfman
The Carnival of the Animals (Le Carnaval des Animaux), Finale	Musical score: The Carnival of the Animals (Le Carnaval des Animaux), Finale by Camille Saint-Saëns; Pianists: Gail Niwa, Philip L. Sabransky; Orchestrator: Bruce Coughlin
The Sorcerer's Apprentice	Musical score: The Sorcerer's Apprentice by Paul Dukas; Performed by an ad-hoc orchestra of Los Angeles-based musicians (soundtrack version performed by the Philharmonia Orchestra); Conductor: Leopold Stokowski (soundtrack version conducted by James Levine)
Pomp and Circumstance – Marches 1, 2, 3 and 4	Musical score: Pomp and Circumstance – Marches 1, 2, 3 and 4 by Edward Elgar, arranged by Peter Schickele; Choir: Chicago Symphony Chorus; Soprano: Kathleen Battle
Firebird Suite – 1919 Version	Musical score: The Firebird (1919 Version) by Igor Stravinsky

=== Technical ===
- Score conductor – James Levine
- Score coordinator – Deniece LaRocca
- Recording and mixing – Shawn Murphy
- Mastering – Patricia Sullivan
- Music consultant – Chris Montan
- Additional recording – Joseph Magee
- Music editing – Kenneth Hahn
- Album executive producer – Peter Gelb, Roy Edward Disney, Laura Mitgang
- Album producer– Jay David Saks
- Production manager – Tom McDougall
- Recording supervisor – Andrew Page, Tod Cooper

=== Locations and partners ===
- Distribution – Sony Music
- Recording – Air Studios, Medinah Temple
- Editing – Sync Sound
- Mixing – Enterprise Studios
- Mastering – A&M Mastering Studios
- Exclusive retailer – Disney Store

== Bibliography ==
- Banagale, Ryan (2014). Arranging Gershwin: Rhapsody in Blue and the Creation of an American Icon. Oxford University Press. ISBN 978-0-19-997840-3.
- Culhane, John (1999). Fantasia 2000: Visions of Hope. Disney Editions. ISBN 0-7868-6198-3.
- Previn, André (1991). No Minor Chords: My Days in Hollywood. Doubleday. ISBN 978-0-385-41341-1.
- Holden, Stephen (2001). The New York Times Film Reviews 1999–2000. Taylor & Francis. ISBN 978-0-415-93696-5. Archived from the original on May 6, 2022.
- Stewart, James B. (2006). DisneyWar: The Battle for the Magic Kingdom. Pocket Books. ISBN 978-0-7434-9600-1.
- Culhane, John (1983). Walt Disney's Fantasia. Harry N. Abrams Inc. ISBN 978-3-8228-0393-6.
- Telotte, Jean-Pierre (2008). The Mouse Machine: Disney and Technology. University of Illinois Press. ISBN 978-0-252-07540-7.
