= Steven Gizicki =

American music supervisor

- Born: September 4, 1968 (age 57); Dearborn, Michigan
- Occupation: Music supervisor
- Years active: Since 1991
- Known for: La La Land (2016); Maestro (2023); A Complete Unknown (2024)
- Website: www.stevengizicki.com

Steven Gizicki is an American music supervisor based in Los Angeles. His notable credits include projects such as La La Land (2016) and Maestro (2023) for both of which he won a Grammy Award for Best Compilation Soundtrack.

== Career ==
After graduating from UCLA with a Bachelor of Arts in History, Gizicki started his musical career at Virgin Records as a marketing executive where he worked with artists such as David Bowie whom he accompanied on his Outside Tour with Nine Inch Nails. He then joined PolyGram as a soundtrack executive, which led him to his career in film music.

In the early 2000s, Gizicki occupied the position of in-house music supervisor at Walt Disney Animation, working on several Disney sequels including Mulan II (2004), Tarzan 2: The Legend Begins (2005) or Bambi II (2006) as a music supervisor. He later worked closely with renowned filmmaker and producer George Lucas on Strange Magic (2015) and several Star Wars animated projects while occupying an in-house position as music supervisor at Lucasfilm.

Steven Gizicki is best known for overseeing music for large-scale musicals such as Damien Chazelle’s La La Land (2016), Lin Manuel Miranda's tick…tick BOOM (2021) and the film adaptation of In The Heights (2021) by Jon M. Chu. He also collaborated with Netflix on several original productions, either as a music supervisor on projects like Academy-award winner Guillermo del Toro's Pinocchio (2022) and Bradley Cooper’s Maestro (2023) or as a music executive on projects including Don’t Look Up (2021), Glass Onion: A Knives Out Mystery (2022) and Leave The World Behind (2023).

In 2024, Gizicki earned a Guild of Music Supervisors Award for best music supervision in a mid-level budget film for his work on James Mangold's Bob Dylan biopic A Complete Unknown (2024) starring Timothée Chalamet.

Gizicki is reportedly working alongside filmmaker Jesse Eisenberg as a music supervisor on his upcoming musical comedy, produced by Emma Stone's production company Fruit Tree, in collaboration with A24.

== Selected filmography ==
- Strange Magic (2015)
- La La Land (2016)
- Teen Spirit (2018)
- Crazy Rich Asians (2018)
- Fosse/Verdon (2019)
- In The Heights (2021)
- tick, tick... Boom! (2021)
- Guillermo del Toro's Pinocchio (2022)
- Maestro (2023)
- A Complete Unknown (2024)

== Awards and nominations ==
Year	Award	Category	Nominated work	Status
2016	Hollywood Music In Media Award	Outstanding Music Supervision - Film	La La Land	Nominated
2017	Guild of Music Supervisors Award	Best Music Supervision for Films Budgeted Over $25 Million	La La Land	Won
2017	Guild of Music Supervisors Award	Best Song/Recording Created for a Film	La La Land	Won
2018	Grammy Award	Best Compilation Soundtrack For Visual Media	La La Land	Won
2019	Emmy Award	Outstanding Music Supervision	Fosse/Verdon	Nominated
2022	Grammy Award	Best Compilation Soundtrack For Visual Media	In The Heights	Nominated
2022	Guild of Music Supervisors Award	Best Music Supervision for Film Budgeted Over $25 Million	tick, tick... Boom!	Won
2024	Hollywood Music In Media Award	Best Music Supervision - Film	A Complete Unknown	Nominated
2025	Grammy Award	Best Compilation Soundtrack For Visual Media	Maestro	Won
2025	Guild of Music Supervisors Award	Best Music Supervision in Mid-Level Budget Films	A Complete Unknown	Won
