= Kevin Weaver =

American music producer

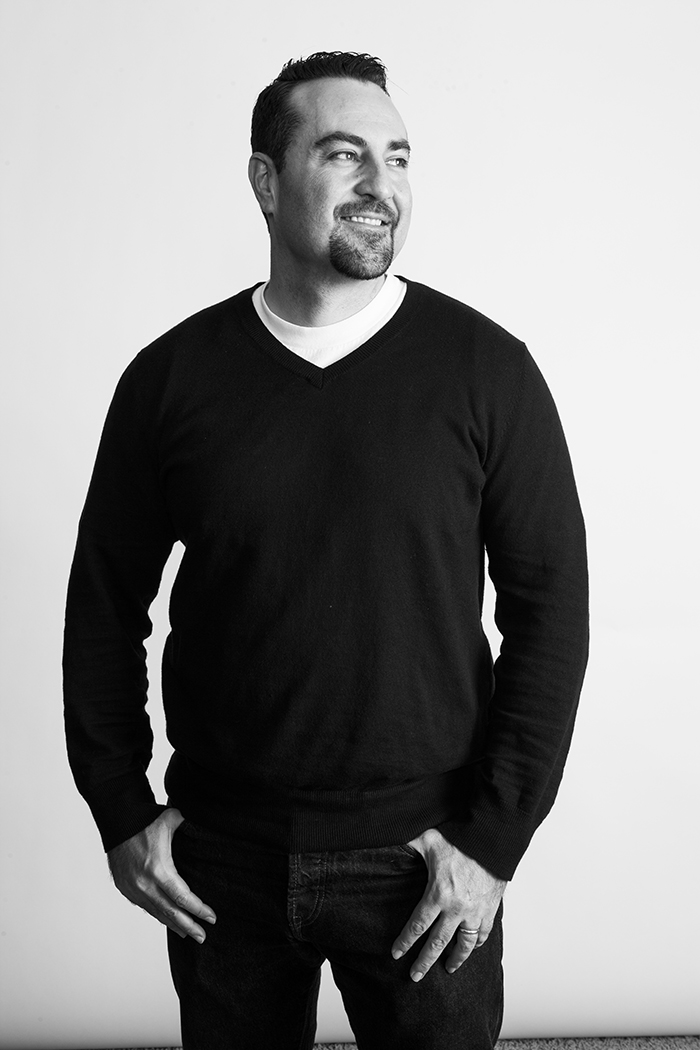
- Title: President of Atlantic Music Group
- Term: 2026–present

Kevin Weaver is an American record producer and record executive who became President of Atlantic Music Group in 2026, after having served as President West Coast of Atlantic Records in Los Angeles since 2017. He has been with the label since 1994 and became President of Film and Television in 2014.

Weaver is best known for producing popular film soundtracks such as Furious 7: Original Motion Picture Soundtrack (2015), Suicide Squad: The Album (2016), The Greatest Showman: Original Motion Picture Soundtrack (2017), Barbie: The Album (2023), Daisy Jones & The Six – AURORA (2023), and Twisters: The Album (2024).

Weaver is a multi–Grammy Award winner and nominee, a Brit Award winner, and a multiple American Music Award and Billboard Music Award winner. He has executive produced soundtracks with RIAA multi-platinum certifications, and his productions have included songs that have won Grammy Awards, Academy Awards, and Golden Globe Awards. In 2018, Rolling Stone described him as a "soundtrack guru."

He is a member of the Academy of Motion Picture Arts and Sciences (AMPAS) and the Recording Academy.

In 2019, Weaver was included in Atlantic's group entry at number nine on Billboard's "Power 100 List", and in 2020 and 2022, he was among those included in Billboard Magazine's re-branded "Power List" of the top executives in the music industry, alongside Atlantic Records co-chairs Craig Kallman and Julie Greenwald, and Atlantic's President of Black Music, Mike Kyser.

== Career ==
=== Early career and Atlantic Records ===
Weaver began his career at Atlantic Records in Los Angeles in 1994, joining the label’s Lava imprint in 1995 to oversee soundtrack projects. From 1998 to 2000, he worked at Tommy Boy Music in A&R before returning to Lava. In 2006, he was promoted to Senior Vice President of Atlantic Records.

He became Executive Vice President of Atlantic Records Group in 2009, President of Film & Television in 2014, and President of Atlantic Records West Coast in 2017.

Beginning in 2009 Weaver operated a publishing joint venture with Atlantic Records and Warner/Chappell Music.

He has also produced television and film specials, including NBC’s Ed Sheeran – Live at Wembley Stadium (2015), Coldplay’s Ghost Stories special (2014), Brandi Carlile’s In The Canyon Haze for IMAX and HBO, and the feature-length Lizzo documentary Love, Lizzo (HBO, 2022).

=== Productions ===
Weaver is credited as an album producer on many commercially successful soundtrack releases, having "built a reputation in Hollywood for turning movie soundtracks into cultural moments that are just as big as the films themselves."

==== 2010s ====
In 2008 and 2010 he produced the Grammy-nominated True Blood Volumes 1 & 2 soundtracks, and in 2012 the 'Girls Volume 1' soundtrack. He was a producer of Boardwalk Empire, Vol. 1 (Music From The HBO Original Series) which won a Grammy Award in 2010 for Best Compilation Soundtrack for Visual Media.

He produced the 2014 soundtrack for The Fault In Our Stars

In 2015, Weaver produced the Furious 7: Original Motion Picture Soundtrack album, which peaked at #1 on the US Billboard 200 Chart and also hit #1 on iTunes in over 65 territories. The soundtrack included the single “See You Again” by Wiz Khalifa (featuring Charlie Puth). The single has since garnered over 4.5 Billion streams and sold over 5 million singles worldwide.[5][6]

In 2016, Weaver produced Suicide Squad (soundtrack), the soundtrack companion to the Warner Bros. film Suicide Squad. The soundtrack debuted at No. 1 on the Billboard 200 and set a record for the most streams in a week for a soundtrack album.

He produced in 2017 The Greatest Showman – Original Motion Picture Soundtrack which sold over 5.3 million copies worldwide. It spent three consecutive weeks at No. 1 on the Billboard Top Albums chart and broke Suicide Squad: The Album’s record for all-time top streaming weeks for a soundtrack. It reached #1 on iTunes in 75 countries. The soundtrack included the single "This Is Me" which was nominated for a Best Original Song Academy Award and won the Golden Globe award for Best Original Song – Motion Picture. The song surpassed 160 million streams globally and was remixed by producer Dave Audé for a dance-oriented version. In 2018 it gained feature exposure when it was featured in NBCUniversal's promotional campaign for the PyeongChang Winter Olympics.

Weaver also produced the 2017 Bright soundtrack, which included tracks by Portugal. the Man, Steve Aoki & Lil Uzi Vert, and ASAP Rocky & Tom Morello.

==== 2020s ====
The Weaver-produced Birds of Prey soundtrack came out in early 2020 and included Doja Cat's "Boss Bitch."

Weaver was a producer of 2023's Aurora (Daisy Jones & the Six album), the studio and soundtrack album promoting the Amazon Prime miniseries Daisy Jones & the Six. The album was nominated for a Grammy for Best Compilation Soundtrack for Visual Media.

Weaver was compilation producer (with Mark Ronson and Brandon Davis) for Barbie The Album, the 2024 Grammy winner for Best Compilation Soundtrack for Visual Media, and for 2024's F1: The Album and Twisters: The Album. The Twisters soundtrack was a Grammy nominee for Best Compilation Soundtrack for Visual Media.

==== Other soundtrack credits ====
Weaver's other credits as executive producer and/or A&R executive for soundtracks include Avatar (Music from the Motion Picture), Paper Towns, The Hangover 1 & 2, Transformers: Dark of the Moon, Rio 2, Michael Bay's Teenage Mutant Ninja Turtles, Step Up 2 & 3, and Happy Feet.

==== TV ====
Weaver was an executive producer for Ed Sheeran's one-hour NBC television special in 2015, "Ed Sheeran - Live at Wembley Stadium," and spearheaded the deal for Coldplay's 2014 NBC concert special "Ghost Stories". In 2013, he produced CeeLo Green's “Magic Moment” Broadcast Christmas Special at Planet Hollywood Hotel and Casino, and was an A&R Executive on the Cee Lo's Magic Moment album.

=== Artist development ===
Weaver has been involved in the development of the careers of artists such as Kid Rock, Bruno Mars, Fun, Icona Pop, Flo Rida, James Blunt, Christina Perri, Charli XCX, Ed Sheeran, Matchbox Twenty, Flo Rida, T.I., Jason Mraz, Christina Perri, James Blunt, Cee Lo Green, Zac Brown, Jewel, and numerous others.

== Awards ==
Grammy Awards
| Year | Nominated work | Award | Result |
|---|---|---|---|
| 2009 | True Blood | Best Compilation Soundtrack Album for Motion Picture, Television or Other Visual Media | Nominated |
| 2010 | True Blood - Volume 2 | Best Compilation Soundtrack Album for Motion Picture, Television or Other Visual Media | Nominated |
| 2011 | Boardwalk Empire: Volume 1 | Best Compilation Soundtrack for Visual Media | Won |
| 2016 | Suicide Squad (Collector's Edition) | Best Compilation Soundtrack for Visual Media | Nominated |
| 2016 | Vinyl: The Essentials Season 1 | Best Compilation Soundtrack for Visual Media | Nominated |
| 2024 | Barbie: The Album | Best Compilation Soundtrack for Visual Media | Won |

Golden Globes
| Year | Nominated work | Award | Result |
|---|---|---|---|
| 2016 | "See You Again" Wiz Khalifa (featuring Charlie Puth), Furious 7: Original Motion Picture Soundtrack | Best Original Song - Motion Picture | Nominated |
| 2018 | "This Is Me" Keala Settle, The Greatest Showman | Best Original Song - Motion Picture | Won |

American Music Awards
| Year | Nominated work | Award | Result |
|---|---|---|---|
| 2014 | The Fault In Our Stars (Music from the Motion Picture) | Favorite Soundtrack | Nominated for this |
| 2016 | Suicide Squad: The Album | Favorite Soundtrack | Nominated for this |
| 2018 | The Fate of the Furious: The Album | Favorite Soundtrack | Nominated for this |
| 2018 | The Greatest Showman: Original Motion Picture Soundtrack | Favorite Soundtrack | Nominated for this |

Academy Awards
| Year | Nominated work | Award | Result |
|---|---|---|---|
| 2024 | "This Is Me" from Barbie | Best Original Song | Won |

Video Music Awards
| Year | Nominated work | Award | Result |
|---|---|---|---|
| 2014 | "Boom Clap" Charli XCX, The Fault In Our Stars | Artist To Watch | Nominated |
| 2015 | "See You Again" Wiz Khalifa (featuring Charlie Puth), Furious 7: Original Motion Picture Soundtrack | Best Hip-Hop Video | Nominated |
| 2015 | "See You Again" Wiz Khalifa (featuring Charlie Puth), Furious 7: Original Motion Picture Soundtrack | Best Collaboration | Nominated |
| 2016 | "Heathens" Twenty One Pilots, Suicide Squad: The Album | Best Rock Video | Won |

Nickelodeon Kids' Choice Awards
| Year | Nominated work | Award | Result |
|---|---|---|---|
| 2017 | Suicide Squad: The Album | Favorite Soundtrack | Won |

== Philanthropy ==
=== ACLU ===
In 2006 Weaver was honored with the prestigious ACLU Bill of Rights Awards. Co-honorees included The Dixie Chicks and director Paul Haggis. Weaver raised nearly half a million dollars towards the support and litigation of cases and other needs that protect Constitutional Civil Rights.

=== T.J. Martell Foundation ===
Weaver has been a board member of the T.J. Martell Foundation since 2008, chairing the annual TJ Martell West Coast Family Day Event multiple times. He is responsible for raising hundreds of thousands of dollars to support funding for pediatric cancer, leukemia and AIDS treatment research.
