= Liz Gallacher =

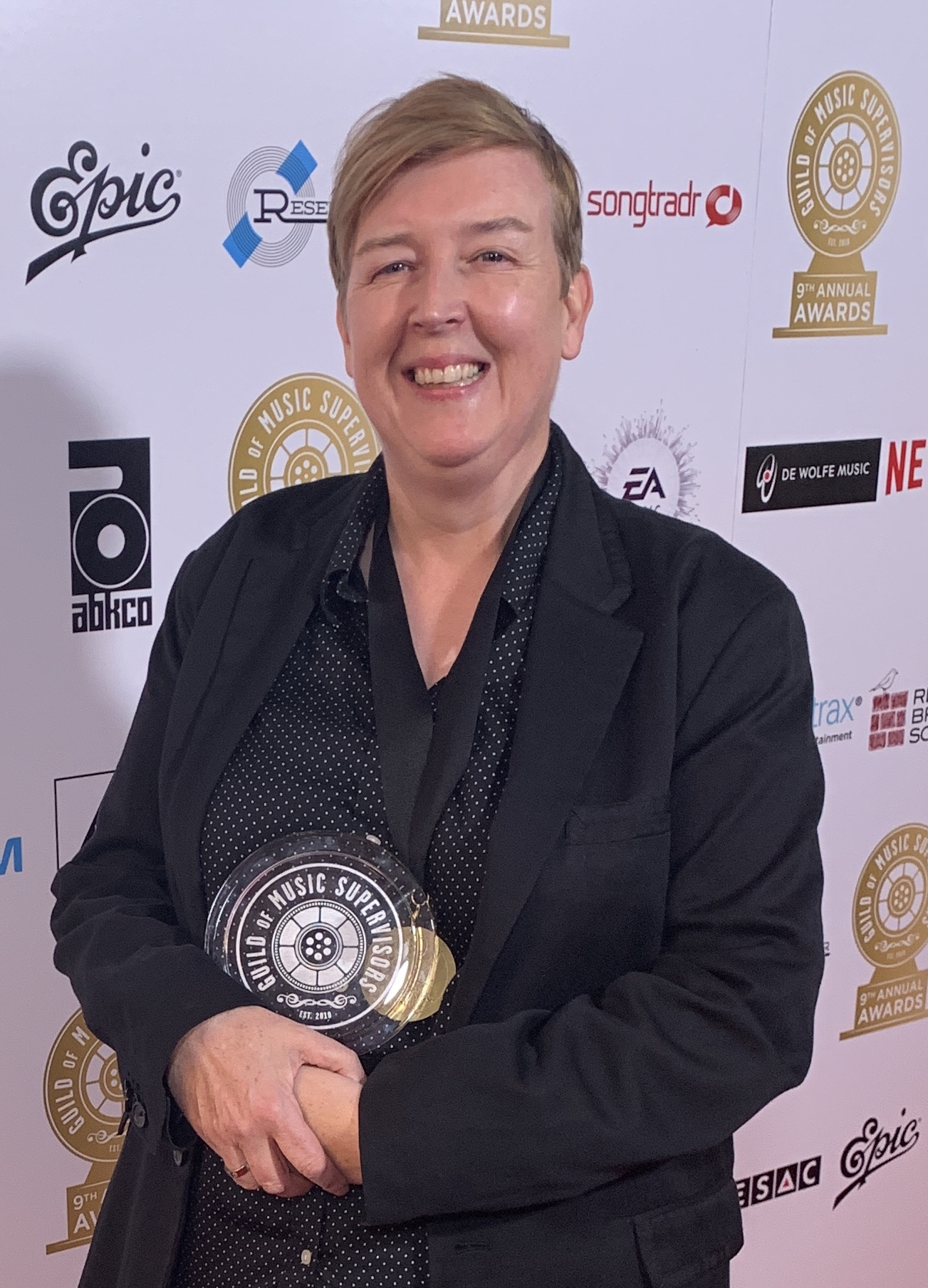
Liz Gallacher at the 2019 Guild of Music Supervisors with her award for Best Supervision for a Documentary for the film Studio 54.

Liz Gallacher is a British music supervisor based in Los Angeles. Gallacher has been called "one of the UK's leading independent music consultants". Her work on projects such as The Full Monty (which won a BRIT Award for Best Soundtrack) and Resident Evil (featuring a Grammy-nominated track by Slipknot) garnered praise from producers, directors, and the press.

She's well-known for her work on independent films as well as documentaries, and has worked on two Oscar-winning documentaries, One Day in September and The Cove. She has also been recognized by The Guild of Music Supervisors for several of her films including Rudderless, War on Everyone, and Studio 54, which won her the award for Best Supervision for a Documentary at the 2019 awards.

She also worked on the critically acclaimed television series Patrick Melrose and Masters of Sex as well at the Netflix Documentary series Beckham which chronicles the life and career of David Beckham.

Liz has worked with directors such as Paul Anderson, Neill Blomkamp, John Michael McDonagh, Peter Cattaneo, Michael Winterbottom, and Gurinder Chadha.

== Filmography ==
- The Land Girls (1998)
- The Full Monty (1997) (Academy Award: Best Original Score, Comedy; BRIT Award: Best Soundtrack)
- Hideous Kinky (1998)
- Fanny and Elvis (1998)
- Notting Hill (music consultant to Richard Curtis) (1999)
- One Day in September (1999)
- The Closer You Get (2000)
- Gangster No.1 (2000)
- Man Utd - Beyond the Promised Land
- Some Voices (2000)
- Goodbye Charlie Bright (2000)
- Large (2000)
- On the Edge (2000)
- Disco Pigs (2000)
- The Low Down (2000)
- Very Annie Mary (2000)
- When Brendan Met Trudy (2001)
- Late Night Shopping (2001)
- Lucky Break (2001)
- The Hole (2001)
- 24 Hour Party People (2001)
- Miranda (2002)
- The Gathering Storm(2002)
- Resident Evil (2002)
- White Teeth (2003)
- Dot the I (2003)
- Meek (2003)
- Live Forever: The Rise and Fall of Brit Pop (2003)
- Calendar Girls (2003)
- Keen Eddie (2003)
- Bend It Like Beckham (2003)
- Layer Cake (2004)
- Being Julia (2004)
- Resident Evil 2 (2004)
- Where the Truth Lies (2005)
- The Dark (2005)
- Kinky Boots (2005)
- Blind Guy (2005)
- Happily N'Ever After (2005)
- Imagine Me & You (2005)
- Life 'n' Lyrics (2006)
- We Live in Public (2009)
- The Cove (2009)
- Fish Tank (2009)
- The Romantics (2010)
- Barney's Version (2010)
- Cemetery Junction (2010)
- Super (2010)
- Conviction (2010)
- Vanishing on 7th Street (2010)
- Let Me In (2010)
- Janie Jones (2010)
- The Guard (2011)
- Project Nim (2011)
- Buck (2011)
- Flypaper (2011)
- Texas Killing Fields (2011)
- Hunky Dory (2011)
- The Imposter (2012)
- Mobbed (2012)
- Marley (2012)
- Safe (2012)
- Now is Good (2012)
- Elysium (2013)
- Calvary (2014)
- Rudderless (2014)
- Los Jets (2014)
- Racing Extinction (2015)
- Drunk Stoned Brilliant Dead: The Story of the National Lampoon (2015)
- Legend (2015)
- Masters of Sex (television series, 2016)
- War on Everyone (2016)
- Vincent N Roxxy (2016)
- Pimp (2017)
- Snatch (2017)
- If I Leave Here Tomorrow: A Film About Lynyrd Skynyrd (2018)
- Do You Trust This Computer? (2018)
- The Miracle Season (2018)
- Patrick Melrose (television series, 2018)
- Dog Days (2018)
- Studio 54 (2018)
- Where's My Roy Cohn? (2019)
- Military Wives (2019)
- Word on Bathroom Walls (2020)
- Console Wars (2020)
- The Serpent (2020)
- Dark (2020)
- The Sleepover (2020)
- Belushi (2020)
- Palmer (2021)
- The Forgiven (2021)
