= Liza Richardson =

American music supervisor

Liza Richardson is a music supervisor for numerous films and TV shows, and served as a DJ at KNON then KERA in Dallas, Texas, then KCRW, an eclectic music and NPR news radio station based in Santa Monica, California. She frequently publishes playlists related to her project soundtracks, as well as mixtapes featuring world music, roots, dance, hip hop and jazz, to her Spotify profile.

Along with her team at Mad Doll Music, Liza has music supervised small screen classics like Friday Night Lights, Parenthood, The Leftovers, Watchmen and Hawaii Five-0. Currently she helms Narcos: Mexico, Lovecraft Country, Barry, Outer Banks, The Morning Show, Queen Sugar, Bull and The Rookie.

Liza’s credits also include the first handful of iPod silhouette spots, films Spenser Confidential, Why Him?, A Dog's Purpose, Lords of Dogtown, Surf's Up, The Kids Are All Right and quintessential Mexican gem Y Tu Mama Tambien.

In 2002, Richardson starred in one of the popular Apple Switch ad campaign commercials. In 2003, she was nominated for a Grammy for her work in compiling the soundtrack for Y Tu Mama Tambien. In February 2007, she was the first DJ to perform for the Academy Awards ceremony. In 2020, Richardson was nominated for an Emmy for her work on Watchmen.

Richardson studied dance at the Interlochen Arts Camp in Interlochen, Michigan, attended Camelback High School in Phoenix, Arizona, and obtained a BFA in Theater and Dance at Southern Methodist University in Dallas, Texas.
