= Thomas Golubić =

Film and television music supervisor

Thomas Golubić is a movie and television music supervisor whose credits include Silo, Better Call Saul, Breaking Bad, The Walking Dead, Rubicon, Halt and Catch Fire, Ray Donovan, Six Feet Under, and After the Sunset. In 2017, 2019, 2020, and 2022, he was nominated for the Primetime Emmy Award for Outstanding Music Supervision in Better Call Saul. In 2003 and 2006, he was nominated for a Grammy for "Best Compilation Soundtrack Album for Motion Picture, Television or Other Visual Media" for Six Feet Under.

== Biography ==
He was born in New Haven, Connecticut. He is of Croatian and German origin.

Golubić is the owner of the Los Angeles–based SuperMusicVision (SMV), which has a broad list of clients, covering projects in a number of creative and professional fields, particularly narrative fiction.

The Guild of Music Supervisors gave Golubić the award for Best Music Supervision in a Television Drama for season 5 of Breaking Bad in 2013. He won the award again for Breaking Bad's final season in 2014. The final season of Breaking Bad featured the instantly popular use of "Baby Blue" by British rock band Badfinger, to which Golubić gives showrunner and creator Vince Gilligan the credit for selecting.

When working on a new project, Golubić creates mixtapes for each character as "part of [his] brainstorming process". During a Reddit AMA he mentioned that many of the most popular music moments on Breaking Bad were result of these playlists, including "Crystal Blue Persuasion" in Episode 508 "Gliding Over All". Recently, in promotion for AMC's latest drama Halt and Catch Fire, these playlists were published in their entirety on Spotify for the first time.

Golubić was a host for the radio station KCRW in Santa Monica, California and in 2007 he started his own show, The Great Escape. "The show blends his dueling passions for music and film, integrating a cinematic sensibility, along with film dialogue, score and sounds. Each week aims to be a compelling soundtrack to a mashed up imaginary film." He also contributed music to Joe Frank's radio programs.

He served as President of the Guild of Music Supervisors from 2017 to 2019 and is a founding member of the organization.

Golubić attended Boston University and Needham High School.
