= Music supervisor =

Person who combines music and visual media

A music supervisor is a person who combines music and visual media. According to the Guild of Music Supervisors, a music supervisor is “a qualified professional who oversees all music related aspects of film, television, advertising, video games and other existing or emerging visual media platforms as required.” In the musical theatre industry, a music supervisor is often responsible for managing a team of music directors working on any number of musical productions. In visual productions, the music supervisor usually works with the directors, writers or producers to choose which songs are best suited for the scenes.

== Description ==
A music supervisor is somebody with a broad and encyclopedic music expertise and a sophisticated knowledge of music licensing and negotiation. Typically, a music supervisor proposes previously recorded songs to the director or producer of a film, advertisement, television show, trailer, promo, video game, or any other form of visual media. A music supervisor will usually act as a liaison between the creative and business ends of the process. Once a song is approved, they approach the rights holders of that song to seek permission to license (usually creating master recording licenses and synchronization licenses) and to work out the financial details of the song's use. In many instances, the artist or songwriter of the recorded song is given the opportunity to accept or decline the synchronization of their song. This position is most active within media-based industries, including live events, television, film, advertising, theatre, and video gaming. Music supervisors may work within production companies, film studios, networks, music supervision companies, or do freelance work.

== Job responsibilities ==
A supervisor's responsibilities are to locate, secure and oversee music-related talent. They liaise between the rights holders of the recorded music involved and the director of the project they have been hired to work on. In addition, they advise, generate and work within financial parameters of the project they are hired to work on. They must deliver musical elements within a timely manner and secure legal rights of the song before it is used. The music supervisor will gather the appropriate information to list credits and, in certain cases, will manage royalty collection.

The overarching responsibility of a music supervisor is to meet the needs of a project's director and producer. This means catering to the creative goals of a project under a strict budget: often less than 5% of a project's total budget.

The director/producer will discuss their vision for the project with the music supervisor, and how they expect the music to enhance this vision. The visual media will then be spotted by the supervisor – a process of choosing where selected music will be inserted. Traditional spots include the main title, opening credits, and closing credits, while additional spots are incorporated to trigger emotional responses from viewers. Scores, or background music, are also an important consideration for enhancing visual media. Scores can range from the background to a dramatic scene to television bumpers – the music signifying leading into or coming back from a commercial break.

After being given or creating a budget, the supervisor must select appropriate music for the project – either by licensing existing songs/scores, or creating new songs/scores. In the selection process, a music supervisor may choose to seek the help of a third party licensing company or a music publisher, which will pitch songs to the supervisor from within their library of music. If creating new music, the supervisor may become responsible for additional roles, including securing artists or composers, facilitating the production and recording process, overseeing finances, and finalizing post-theatrical uses of the soundtrack. When using pre-existing music, the supervisor's duties focus on the legal and financial aspects of licensing and negotiating. A large percentage of a music supervisor's job revolves around music clearance alone.

When it comes to royalty collections, a music supervisor will sometimes be in charge of arranging this source of the selected artist's revenue. Royalties for music placements are paid out by Performance Rights Organizations (such as ASCAP, BMI, and SESAC in the United States). In order to detect the placements an artist has made with visual media, these companies need to be aware of their placement. Depending on the type of project (ad placement, television show, etc.). the music supervisor will have to either make sure the artist is credited properly, send video clips of the placement to the publisher (which will then be sent to the proper Performance Rights Organization), or create a cue sheet of all of the songs used in the project

Many directors and producers will choose to work with a single supervisor for a project, however it varies from project to project. For example, music supervisors can be hired at an entertainment company as an “in house” staff member to manage the supervision for several projects (such as at an advertising agency). A production company may also hire a supervisor on a project-by-project basis (such as hiring one supervisor for an entire television series as seen with Gossip Girl or The O.C.). Music supervisors may also be hired on a show-by-show basis (ex. AMC's Mad Men, which has used multiple music supervisors).

== Qualifications/background ==
A music supervisor must have a wide knowledge of music and a passion for musical research. There is no set educational or career path to become a music supervisor. Educational backgrounds range from Bachelor of Fine Arts in music to business degrees to no higher education at all. Because the majority of the position involves music negotiations, clearances, publishing/performing deals, etc., a legal background is an excellent qualification. Some supervisors are musicians, producers, agents, or managers – experience with the music or film/television industries is a strong background upon which to build. Despite common misconceptions, musical knowledge (writing, reading, performing, composing) is not nearly as important as a familiarity with a broad range of music, including popular styles and artists, as well as the production/negotiating process itself. Author of Music Business Handbook and Career Guide David Baskerville notes "This is one of the few production specialties that has almost unlimited growth potential, because there [is] no universally accepted job description. The field remains wide open to people with connections and the ability to get the job done."

The proliferation of video technology has resulted in an increased demand for production companies needing to license music, and the field now accommodates many career professionals. Because of the massive expansion in the field, many colleges and universities offer courses in music supervision. For example, NYU Steinhardt's Music Business program offers a course titled “Strategic Music and Branding”.

== Salary ==
Music supervisor salaries vary depending upon the project and the hiring process. Salaries can range from $35,000 annually at a music supervision firm, to upwards of $250,000 for a freelance supervisor per feature film (Austin). Music supervisors also have the opportunity to continue receiving funds through soundtrack royalties. It is generally more profitable (assuming one will be regularly hired) to work freelance jobs than to work for a larger corporation. However, some supervisors may choose to work within a music supervision company. In addition, music supervisors who work "in house" within an entertainment, such as an advertising agency or within the music department of a production company, will earn a salary based upon their ranking and company earnings. While staff jobs with a network, studio, or production company offer more security, the recognition and pay are significantly lower. Despite the environment, a music supervisor should always work out a contract including expectations, responsibilities, and payment before beginning a project.

== History ==
Originally, music was used in silent films to hide mechanical noises within a theatre, like the projector. Often a musician would be present to play improvised or pre-selected pieces along with the visual images on screen. This led to the establishment of the soundtrack, and an emphasis on accompanying silent visual media with music. Over time, films began hiring composers to create instrumental soundtracks to accompany films. It became apparent to studios that when a movie included a hit song, more people were likely to see it, and as a result of that, more people were likely to purchase the song recording. The demand for music supervisors in the production process solidified in the 1980s, and has continued to grow with the popularity of media soundtracks. While the use of songs not originally composed for the film did not save money, licensing a song made for a more stable understanding for the director and producer of the film what music was going to be used in the scene. Instead of having to wait for new instrumental music to be commissioned, they could have an understanding of what recording would be used before the film was finalized. This led to an emerging need for selecting and licensing songs, which is how the position of music supervisor developed. Taking advantage of this musical component has become an increasingly feasible marketing strategy for these media outlets, placing a growing responsibility on the music supervisor.

Over the past decade, synchronization licensing has become one of the most significant ways for an artist to gain exposure and to earn money. Finding a way to a music supervisor can give an artist the opportunity to spread their music on a platform that would expose them to a much larger audience than they may have been able to find on their own. One of the most notable synchronization collaborations was with Moby's 1999 album Play, which was the first ever to have all of its tracks linked to a synchronization license.

The job of a music supervisor has only recently become increasingly significant and the importance of this position continues to grow. Institutions such as the Guild of Music Supervisors are promoting the understanding of music supervision. In 2007 several supervisors, in order to promote, pursue and recognize the craft of music supervision. Since 2011 guild has granted awards for excellence in the position. They encourage other institutions, such as the Hollywood Music and Media Awards, to acknowledge accomplishments in the field.

Since 2017, the role in American television has been honored by the Academy of Television Arts & Sciences with the Primetime Emmy Award for Outstanding Music Supervision, which was first presented at the 69th Primetime Emmy Awards.

== Notable music supervisors ==
- Gary Calamar: Six Feet Under, Dexter, True Blood
- Chris Douridas: American Beauty, Shrek 2, In a World..., Captain Fantastic, Flaked
- Liz Gallacher: Resident Evil, The Full Monty, Bend It like Beckham, 24 Hour Party People, Marley
- Steven Gizicki: La La Land, In The Heights, tick, tick... Boom!, Maestro, A Complete Unknown
- Thomas Golubić – Breaking Bad, The Walking Dead, The Killing
- Nic Harcourt: Igby Goes Down, The Dukes of Hazzard, Gone Baby Gone, 90210
- Evyen Klean: Game of Thrones, Bessie, Behind the Candelabra
- Brian Reitzell: Lost in Translation, Marie Antoinette, Beginners, The Bling Ring
- Karyn Rachtman: Pulp Fiction, Boogie Nights, Clueless, Reservoir Dogs
- Liza Richardson: Y Tu Mama Tambien, The Kids Are All Right, Friday Night Lights, The Leftovers
- Robbie Robertson: The Wolf of Wall Street, Shutter Island
- Frederic Schindler: Uncle Howard, On the Milky Road, Alcarràs, Libertad
- Randall Poster: The Wolf of Wall Street, The Grand Budapest Hotel, Vinyl, Skyfall
- Alexandra Patsavas: Grey's Anatomy, The O.C., Mad Men, Gossip Girl, The Twilight Saga
