= Alexandra Patsavas =

American music supervisor, producer and executive (born 1968)

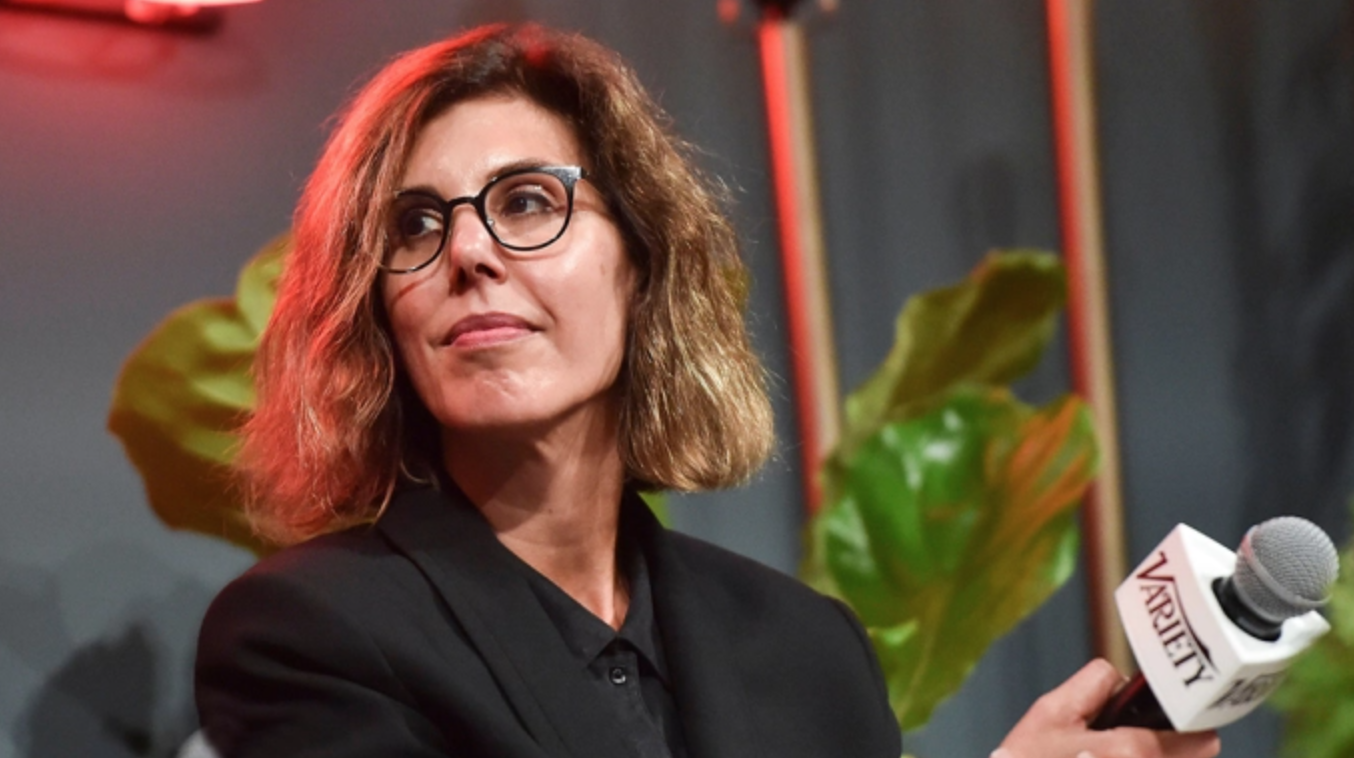
Alexandra Patsavas in 2020

Alexandra Patsavas (born 1968) is a Grammy and Emmy nominated American music supervisor, producer, & executive who has worked on over 100 films and television series, most notably The Twilight Saga, The O.C., Grey's Anatomy, Gossip Girl, Mad Men, Bridgerton, and CODA.

== Early life ==
Patsavas was born in Chicago, Illinois and is of Greek descent. Although influenced by parents’ musical tastes, which ranged from rock to opera, Patsavas was more interested in studying politics until her high school years when she developed an interest in music, attending rock concerts, buying LPs and being "the kid with the bad '80s haircut who went to all the clubs and shows".

== Career ==
She has worked in the music department of over sixty different films and television series. From there she joined the BMI music agency, then worked on Roger Corman B-movies, made-for-television movies and other films. In 1999 she finally broke into television, with her own music company Chop Shop Music Supervision, on the series Roswell and began to work primarily on TV series, including Carnivàle, Fastlane, Boston Public, Tru Calling, 1-800-Missing and Criminal Minds, as well as the film Happy, Texas. In 2007 alone, she covered dozens of episodes of the series Without a Trace, Shark, Rescue Me and Mad Men. Her most notable work has been on the series The O.C., Grey's Anatomy and its spin-off Private Practice, Supernatural, Chuck, Gossip Girl, Scandal, Riverdale, Lucifer, Inventing Anna and Bridgerton, for which she was nominated for an Emmy.

Her work on The O.C. involved the selecting, mixing and supervising of all the tracks that featured in the show, as well as on the six soundtracks that followed. Her work was also substantially made up of approaching bands and artists about recording covers and requesting licensing permission to include songs on the show and in the mixes. Because her ongoing search for suitable songs often leads to unsigned or non-mainstream performers, she is partially responsible for re-surfacing the trend of music promotion through television since The Flaming Lips's appearance in Beverly Hills, 90210, particularly on Grey's Anatomy with songs such as Snow Patrol's "Chasing Cars" and The Fray's "How to Save a Life", which both saw huge success after being featured in the show. Following this trend was the Beastie Boys' single "Ch-Check It Out" which debuted in an episode of The O.C., even before its premiere on the radio. Josh Schwartz, who originally hired Patsavas for The O.C., which he created, re-hired her for Gossip Girl and Chuck, both of which he created, after seeing the success that she brought to both The O.C. and the songs and artists featured in it. Her work on Gossip Girl brought in many New York-orientated bands (for the show's setting) and other popular songs including Fergie's "Glamorous" for the series' promotional video. She recently was music supervisor on Marvel's Runaways, also produced by Josh Schwartz and Stephanie Savage.

In 2007 Chop Shop Music Supervision, opened its own music label Chop Shop Records, in a deal with Atlantic Records, later moving to Universal Records. The label's roster included Anya Marina, Scars on 45 (both of whom were featured on Grey's Anatomy), Macintosh Braun, Milo Greene, The Republic Tigers and the Twilight soundtracks. In addition to the Twilight Series, Patsavas has also worked on many films including The Hunger Games: Catching Fire, The Perks of Being a Wallflower, Wonder, A Futile and Stupid Gesture, Warm Bodies, Moxie and more recently the Oscar winner CODA.

Patsavas has been nominated three times for a Grammy Award for the "Best Compilation Soundtrack Album for Motion Picture, Television or Other Visual Media". Her first nomination was for the compilation Grey's Anatomy Original Soundtrack, Vol. 2, the only television soundtrack in the category, shared with producer Mitchell Leib and the various artists that were featured in the album. Her other nominations (both with Paul Katz) were for the Twilight: Original Motion Picture Soundtrack and The Twilight Saga: Eclipse (Original Motion Picture Soundtrack), each of which were released on her label Chop Shop Records.

She was also a judge for the 5th annual Independent Music Awards to support independent artists' careers. She also served as Chair of the Board of Musicares following 10 years as an officer and board member of the charitable arm of the Recording Academy.

In 2020 Patsavas joined Netflix in the newly created role of director/music creative production for original series, overseeing Netflix's creative music services and production strategy for original series.

== In popular culture ==
In the season 5 episode of the HBO show Girls titled "Hello Kitty," the characters Marnie and Desi learn that their song has been chosen by Patsavas to appear in an upcoming episode of Grey’s Anatomy, which they anticipate will change their lives.

== Personal life ==
Patsavas labels herself as a member of "the first MTV Generation", and lists her inspirational musical influences as Henry Mancini, David Holmes, Elvis Costello and Ahmet Ertegün.
