= Randall Poster =

American music supervisor

Randall Poster is an American music supervisor and a long-term collaborator with Wes Anderson. He worked on the films Skyfall (2012), The Wolf of Wall Street (2013), The Grand Budapest Hotel (2014), and The Irishman (2019), as well as the TV series Vinyl (2016).

Passionate about music and film, he started in music supervision sourcing songs for a script he co-wrote with a friend at the Sundance Institute. In 2011, Poster's work on the Boardwalk Empire soundtrack earned him a Grammy Award for Best Compilation Soundtrack.

The Guardian defined Randall's soundtracks as "simply great jukeboxes." He is the founder of the music supervision company Search Party sourcing music for film, TV, advertisement and branded content. In advertising, his credits include Prada, Jimmy Choo and Calvin Klein.

In addition, Poster co-wrote the screenplay for A Matter of Degrees, a film set in and around a college radio station, directed by W.T. Morgan and released in 1991.
