= Ali Hossaini =

American artist, philosopher and businessman

- Born: 1962 (age 63–64); West Virginia
- Education: PhD, philosophy, University of Texas at Austin, 1994 MA, Philosophy, University of Texas at Austin, 1986 BA, Philosophy, Washington University in St. Louis, 1986 Master Printing, International Center for Photography, 1988 Masters Poetry Seminar, Columbia University, 1990
- Occupations: artist, philosopher, consultant, television producer and businessperson
- Organization(s): Fellow National Gallery Co-Director & Co-founder, National Gallery X, National Gallery Visiting Senior Research Fellow & Programme Leader – 'Connected Culture', King's College London Fellow Royal Society of Arts Digital Media Thought Leader, Lord Cultural Resources Associate, Digital Scholar & Curator, Futurecity
- Notable work: Ouroboros, Solo show, Multichannel Video Installation, Ise Cultural Foundation, New York City, 2010 Epiphany, multimedia performance, Brooklyn Academy of Music Next Wave Festival, 2015. The Impact of 5G on culture & creative industry, keynote, Global congress of [[Wireless Broadband Alliance]], Liverpool, 2016. Hossaini, Ali (2017). Manual of Digital Museum Planning. Lanham : Rowman & Littlefield. ISBN 978-1442278974. Is Art Alive? How AI Technology & Algorithms are Changing the Nature of Creativity, Art Leaders Network, The New York Times conference, Berlin, 2018. Hossaini, Ali (2019). "Putting agency on the agenda: What biology tells us about threat from AI". RUSI Journal. 164 (5): 120–144. doi:10.1080/03071847.2019.1694264. S2CID 213421597. Archived from the original on 2020-11-25.
- Board member of: Young Vic Theatre
- Awards: University Fellowship, University of Texas at Austin Woolrich Fellowship for Poetry, Columbia University Fellowship, International Center for Photography
- Website: http://pantar.com

Ali Hossaini (b. West Virginia, 1962) is an American artist, philosopher, theatrical producer, television producer, and businessperson. In 2010, The New York Times described him as a "biochemist turned philosopher turned television producer turned visual poet". In 2017 Hossaini published the Manual of Digital Museum Planning and subsequently became co-director of National Gallery X, a King's College London partnership that explores the future of art and cultural institutions. Prior to National Gallery X Hossaini worked with King's College to develop Connected Culture, an action research programme that tested cultural applications for 5G supported by Ericsson. As a working artist and producer, Hossaini's genre-spanning career includes installations, performances and hundreds of media projects. Since 2018 Hossaini has worked with security think tank Royal United Services Institute and, in a 2019 special edition of its journal, he assessed the threat from AI from the perspective of biology.

== Early life and education (1962-1994) ==
The son of an Iraqi father and American mother, Hossaini was born in West Virginia in the United States. Hossaini came of age during the Reagan Era, and became a producer and host (1989–1994) for Alternative Views, a television program that offered progressive news, commentary and interviews. He also produced short films that were distributed by Deep Dish Television and went on to write for the Village Voice and other publications.

=== Education ===
Hossaini studied at Washington University in St. Louis, Columbia University & The University of Texas at Austin where he was awarded a doctorate in philosophy in 1994. His thesis – Archaeology Of The Photograph traced the development of optics from Sumer to the Hellenistic period. This thesis would go on to inform much of his subsequent forward-looking work in academic publishing, media technology and optics including contributions to the Encyclopedia of Twentieth Century Photography and Vision of The Gods: How Optics Shaped History published by Logos (journal).

== Career ==
=== Early roles (1994-2001) ===
From 1994 to 1996 Hossaini worked as a sponsoring editor at the University of Texas Press Austin where he academic manuscripts in the humanities, including classics, media studies, and women's studies. Hossaini helped launch The Surrealist Revolution at the University of Texas Press, a book series whose inaugural volume, Surrealist Woman, revealed the suppressed histories of female artists. He also published one of the first electronic books, Istanbul Boy, in 1996. and produced one of the first public webcasts, Come to Me, that same year.

In 1996, Hossaini left Texas to join the staff of The Site, a San Francisco-based television newsmagazine on MSNBC, as a producer and commentator. He did pioneering work in social media by building audience interaction into television. He moved to ZDTV in 1997 where he continued to develop interactive projects that integrated audience tools like chat and webcams into television programs. From 1999 to 2001, Hossaini was a vice president for community at Oxygen Media, he developed applications for video sharing and managed presence to integrate numerous corporate acquisitions into a single network.

=== Rainbow DBS and Voom HD Networks (2002-2009) ===
As a director of programming and executive producer for Rainbow DBS (later Voom HD Networks) from 2002 until 2009, Hossaini managed production, licensing and broadcast efforts for the first dedicated art documentary and video art television channels – Gallery HD, LAB HD, as well as Equator HD high-definition television channel devoted to travel, culture and natural history until 2009.

==== Robert Wilson Video Portraits ====
As executive producer of LAB HD, Hossaini fostered the creation of several dozen avant-garde films, including the Voom Portraits Robert Wilson, a project which became well known after Vanity Fair featured one of its subjects, actor Brad Pitt, on its cover. The series of HDTV videos feature performances by Hollywood stars, including Robert Downey Jr., Isabella Rossellini and Willem Dafoe, European and Persian royalty and notable artists. The Voom Portraits Robert Wilson exhibition opened in 2007 at Paula Cooper Gallery and Philips de Pury Gallery in New York City.

Hossaini describes the genesis of the project in Robert Wilson Video Portraits, an edited volume published by ZKM. In a separate interview for HD TV Technology Hossaini noted that his early adoption of HD video in the production of Wilson's portrait enabled the conscious evolution of the video art to be consumer akin to other art forms such as painting.

"The other idea of the video portrait is to do a very playful extension of the painting. Wilson is noted for very, very slow movement in all of his theater and film work that he has done before. In this case, he wanted to create these things that almost look like a still life on the wall, but then they started gradually to move. The more you watch them, the more you see in terms of that movement. They sit up on your wall as permanent installations, so video is the perfect medium for this kind of exercise."

Greg Moyer of Voom HD Networks would go on to comment that this production "brought Robert Wilson to high definition in some regards. He'd been using the medium prior, but we facilitated every aspect of the portraits."

=== The establishment of Pantar Productions (2009-2011) ===
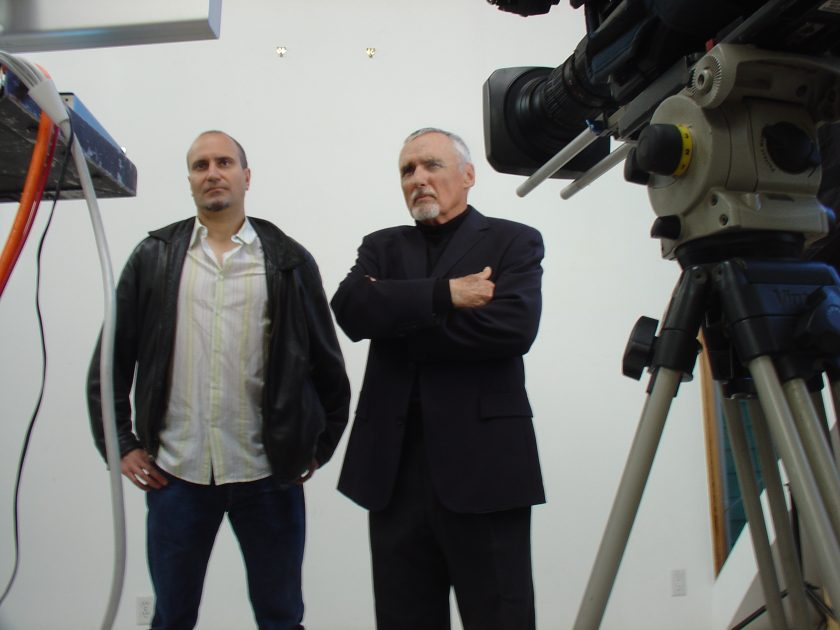
Ali Hossaini & Dennis Hopper on the set of Autograph

In 2009 Hossaini expanded his independent consulting and production activity under the umbrella of Pantar Productions. From 2009-2011 he produced content for clients that included NHK, High Fidelity HDTV, The Submarine Channel Submarine Channel - Interactive Storytelling and Indieflix, amongst others. In this time Hossaini produced the Metropolis Art Competition for Babelgum productions – a short film competition in which a jury (including Isabella Rossellini and Guy Maddin) awarded an emerging film maker $20,000 first prize and screened their short film in Times Square. Hossaini also produced Epitaph an autobiographical short directed by Dennis Hopper shortly before his death.

Through Pantar Productions Hossaini realised the first iteration his Ouroboros: The History of The Universe art installation at the Ise Cultural Foundation Ise Cultural Foundation in Soho, New York. In a review for The New York Times Dennis Overbye remarked that the work "bypass the rational part of the brain and head[s] straight for someplace deeper, to make us experience the universe not as a concatenation of forces but as a poem."

Ouroboros would set a trend for much of Hossaini's subsequent artistic and professional activity, ostensibly exploring how art and technology can, in his words (2016), "help facilitate a shift from authentic objects to authentic experiences."

=== Luminaria (2012-2014) ===
In 2012 Hossaini was approached by the City of San Antonio to develop a five-year strategic plan to transform their Lumniaria Arts festival into a globally significant festival of arts and ideas. Hossaini's preliminary plan developed with Dissident Industries, a New York-based firm, would be to alternate the festival annually with a workshop or "a participatory lab for festival development and experimentation.". The plan advocated the expansion of the new biannual event into a ten-day festival and was credited with aligning the festival with downtown development initiatives and the city's strategic ambitions.

In a 2014 interview Hossaini commented that the goal was to convert Luminaria from a "by San Antonio, for San Antonio" event into a "by San Antonio, for San Antonio, and for the rest of the world" The president of the Luminaria board credited the report with a helping to instigate paradigm shift for the organisation – "Living event to event isn't working,.. Now we're talking about Luminaria as a concept, as an organization (instead of a once-a-year event)"

=== Cinema Arts Network (2011-2017) ===
In 2011 Hossaini became CEO of CAN: Cinema Arts Network, a UK-based consortium of cinemas and art centers funded by the BFI. The company launched with a live broadcast of the London Symphony Orchestra from the Barbican Centre. Cinema Arts Network completed a national broadband "Network for the arts" in 2014, and in 2015 Hossaini announced CAN 2.0, an initiative to engage audiences via smartphones in sixteen UK arts venues. Hossaini remarked at the Johannesberg Summit of Global Congress of the Wireless Broadband Alliance technological convergence allows initiatives like this Cinema Arts Network to proflierate, nothing that connectivity alone is a "transformative factor that catalyses transformative changes in society."

=== Manual of Digital Museum Planning ===
In 2017, Hossaini coedited the Manual of Digital Museum Planning with Ngaire Blankenberg which the publisher, Rowman & Littlefield, describe as the comprehensive guide to digital planning, development, and operations for museum professionals and students of museums studies and arts administration.

=== King's College ===
Since 2017 Hossaini has been visiting research fellow in the Department of Informatics at King's College London. In 2019 he co-founded National Gallery X, a joint research studio maintained by the National Gallery and King's College London. In 2020 Hossaini was promoted to visiting senior research fellow in the Department of Engineering at King's College London. In this capacity, he serves as co-director of National Gallery X, and his responsibilities include curating and collaborating with studio residents and building creative links between the Gallery and King's College London researchers.

==== Connected Culture ====
In 2016 Ericsson and King's College London announced that Hossaini would lead Connected Culture, a joint project that applies 5G networking techniques to immersive media. Connected Culture examined how vision, hearing and touch perform over 5G networks. Public workshops were held at National Theatre Studio, RADA and Sadler's Wells, and Hossaini tested a new spatial audio system Soundscapes within his 3D video installation Ouroboros. As a result of Hossaini's project in June 2018 the city of London announced they would be hosting the world's first 5G connected theatre in collaboration with Berlin. The project report contains details on how to manage art-science collaborations and reports on perceptual tolerances to network faults.

With the outbreak of COVID-19 pandemic in 2020 Ericsson explored work of the connected culture initiative noting the way that well before an event like COVID-19 the Hossaini's vision "had the ambition to show how the three sensory elements of touch, sight and sound could be heightened to make any experience much more immersive.". In a virtual panel as a part of the Ericsson UnBoxed Office social series, "5G: Connecting Culture", Hosseini noted that with 5G, independent artists will have the same kind of access that major cultural institutions do and suggested that this will help drive a major cultural explosion in small towns around the world as creativity is going to be one of the primary ways of maintaining connection to others.

=== National Gallery X ===
In 2019 King's College London, The National Gallery and Google Arts & Culture formally launched 'National Gallery X' (NGX), a collaborative research and development programme. Located in a hub next to the main National Gallery building, the NGX examines how technological inventions can be applied to cultural institutions in the future and inform new kinds of cultural experiences. National Gallery X (NGX) is part of an innovation lab within the Department of Digital, Culture, Media, and Sport's (DCMS) Culture is Digital policy programme. The Culture is Digital programme was launched in 2018 at the Gallery by the then secretary of state to stimulate the relationship between the culture and technology sectors.

As co-director of NGX Hossaini describes the goal of the undertaking is to "spark a modern renaissance" by bringing together people who are cross-trained artists, scientists and engineers to create "new forms of spatialised experience that our predecessors couldn't have dreamed of". National Gallery X was launched in September 2019 by Gabriele Finaldi and speakers included Tim Berners-Lee.

==== Leading the COVID-19 pandemic Response ====
In 2020 National Gallery X and Hossaini commissioned and released their first commission as a virtual versions of an art installation that reveals the sounds of colour in paintings virtual in response the COVID-19 pandemic. KIMA: Colour in 360 by Analema Group launched on the second of June 2020 and consists of three video works that transform colour data from Jan van Eyck's Arnolfini Portrait, Claude Monet's Water Lilies (Monet series), and Vincent van Gogh's Wheat Field with Cypresses into 360-degree light and sound experiences. Two of these were made immediately available to view on YouTube and the National Gallery website with the van Eyck-inspired work following later. The virtual artist residency by Analema Group was a part of a revised programme that takes the lockdown as its context and subject and offers a series of creative and philosophical responses to the new world coronavirus has created.

In an interview on the project Hossaini commented that the COVID-19 pandemic had radically accelerated the nature of artistic expression as well as shifted the fundamental core value propositions of museums as well as augmented their underlying architectonic logic:

Covid-19 slammed the accelerator on long-term trends. Since the 90s I’ve staked my career on convergence: the idea that the Internet will absorb every other medium. It started with mail then print. I remember when people said no one will watch TV on their computer let alone their phone. I prefer making the future to predicting it, but I think the next wave of convergence is architecture. I call KIMA: Colour in 360 a ‘boundless meditation on the essence of art’, but it is also a meditation on walls and the intersection of physical and virtual space. During the Covid-19 lockdown, artist's tools have evolved at warp speed, and more importantly, so have people's habits. As the National Gallery and other cultural places re-open, they’ll have access to vigorous new tech that make buildings more like websites while distributing key features of architecture over media channels. Interactivity, personalization and other features we take for granted online will become part of places, and distinctions between physical and virtual will fade as architecture comes online.

Subsequently, on the 16th of June 2020, the NGX launched their digital events programme in collaboration with the London media art platform Art in Flux. Art in Flux‘ART IN FLUX @ NGX - GENDER*UCK - Media art beyond and between concepts of Gender' - presented new-media artwork exploring the boundaries between art and technology. In a press release released by the National Gallery the gallery Director Gabriele Finaldi commented:

It may seem paradoxical that a Gallery whose doors are shut due to the pandemic can be even more creative than before. But the Analema Group's residency at NGX shows how the nation's pictures are inspiring a new generation of digital artists to respond in unprecedented ways even in lockdown

While Hossaini summarised -

For 200 years, the National Gallery has welcomed the world through its doors, then the unimaginable happened. We had to bring the National Gallery into people's homes. Analema has given us a boundless meditation on the essence of painting.

===== The AI Gallery =====
In 2021 Hossaini co-curated with Neus Torres Tamarit an online collection of works which have created with Machine learning and other Artificial intelligence techniques. Which he describes as a 'cultural exchange program between AI and humanity'

The gallery is the result of a partnership with the UK Research and Innovation's Trustworthy Autonomous Systems Hub (TAS Hub), National Gallery X the exhibition launched at Trusting Machines?, a conference co-produced with the Royal United Services Institute(RUSI) and the TAS Hub.

The aim of Trusting Machines? was to spark insights and deeper conversations. With the exhibition noting that:

the AI Gallery will continue as a 'cultural exchange programme' between humanity and the systems whose influence - and mystery - grows daily. Machine arts challenge traditional notions of creativity, but we think it is vital not to anthropomorphise autonomous systems. As the exhibition grows, we will work with the TAS Hub and beyond to develop a rigorous framework for understanding the emerging palettes of AI art and how they fit into human society.

As a part of the exhibition Hossaini also directed and co-produced a 21-minute video artwork entitled 'The First' with Luca Vigano. The film is viewable online. In a statement released by the Gallery Hossaini and Vigano comment that:

"The Turing Test is a classic way of distinguishing humans from AI. What happens when humans turn the tables on machines? This film explores a future scenario where the rights of sentient beings clash with freedom, identity and ethical judgment."

'The First' work was presented again at the Royal United Services Institute in a subsequent interview and q&a as a part of the first day of the Trusting Machines conference. The full presentation was archived by RUSI and remains online.

==== Groupthink - National Gallery x Ars Electronica ====
In September 2011, The National Gallery partnered with Ars Electronica to present Groupthink - a collaborative artwork conceived by Hossaini in his role as National Gallery X co-director. The work was the result of a broader artistic team who was in dual residency at National Gallery X and the UKRI TAS Hub. The aim of the residency was to guide research on the implications of a neurally connected society.

The premise of the project was the concept of "The Internet of Neurons" and the observation that explosion of biohybrid technologies is bringing our bodies and brains online. This then drove the question of what happens when all are connected? The aim of Groupthink was to. give a glimpse into a future where "art emerges from the heart".

During the performance Audiences anywhere could join via webcam. Software would then detect their pulse and translate it into a live visual score performed by sitarist Shama Rahman and percussionist Mick Grierson. Located in the National Gallery's basement, a resident AI algorithm then reinterpreted famous paintings in the museum above as a pulsating video environment that responded both to and entangled the audience and performers as 'entangled roots, limbs and life of imaginary forests'.

=== 5G Trailblazers Campaign ===
In early 2021, Hossaini was recognised as one of 25 '5G Trailblazer' as a part of Ericsson's campaign to promote the technology. The campaign was designed to " champion 5G's best and brightest; those who are leading the charge for change in 5G connectivity" In their recognition of Hossaini the company noted that:

Academic, writer and artist Ali Hossaini has been exploring how 5G can enhance the arts through immersive experiences, creating the world's first 5G-enabled theatre in partnership with Arts Council England...Ali's creative approach to 5G provides a unique vision for the future of culture, commerce and technology.

== Speaking and presentations ==
Hossaini is a well-known speaker on art, technology and politics. In 2015 and 2016, The New York Times invited him to present at Art for Tomorrow, and in 2017 he hosted a weekend on Democracy & Film for The New York Times at Athens Democracy Forum.

In 2019 Hossaini worked with security think tank Royal United Services Institute and, to produce a special edition of its journal and assessed the threat from AI from the perspective of biology. In the text he invited essays 4 distinguished biologists who wrote detailed responses The texts surveyed the challenges AI creates for security and defence from the level of individuals to states and then the globe. The edition noted how in both creative and defence contexts AI provokes profound questions about what it means to be human and creates innumerable risks and opportunities to the current security environment. Hossaini noted in his own text that the "rather than from an intelligence explosion and its consequences, the potential threat may come instead from AI's ability to acquire agency"

=== Discussions and lectures ===
==== 2016 ====
- Artificial Intelligence: Can Machines Possess Emotions? Panelist, Edinburgh Digital Entertainment Festival
- The Impact of 5G on culture & creative industry, keynote, Global congress of Wireless Broadband
- Alliance, Liverpool
- How 5G is Transforming Arts, Culture & Creative Industry, keynote, Johannesberg Summit, Sweden
- Designing Experience, keynote, Chinese Association of Museums, Taipei
- Digital Engagement in Museums, National History Museum, Taipei

==== 2017 ====
- Staging the Future: Artificial Intelligence & Conflict, moderator & coproducer, RUSI / Atlantic Council, London.
- Democracy & Film, host & moderator, New York Times Athens Democracy Forum, Costa Navarino, Greece.
- Industry 4.0: Media, telecommunications & the Smart City, International Forum on Creative Industry, Ministry of Culture, Taipei, Taiwan
- Connecting Cultures, keynote, International Forum on Creative Industries, Ministry of Culture, Taipei
- Is your organisation fit for a complex & uncertain future?, Royal United Services Institute, London Technology Ecosystem of Museums, Chinese Association of Museums, Taipei
- Digital Curating, Keynote lecture, International Digital Culture Forum, Taichung, Taiwan
- Digital museum planning, American Alliance of Museums conference, St. Louis

==== 2018 ====
- Is Art Alive? How AI Technology & Algorithms are Changing the Nature of Creativity, Art Leaders Network, New York Times conference, Berlin.
- What about Wireless? Network Performing Art Production Workshop, New World Symphony, Florida.

==== 2019 ====
- Building the 5G Museum (lecture & panel discussion), Cultech Festival, Taipei.
- What's Britain's Best Startup City?, MIPIM UK Summit, London.
- Putting Poetry in the Machine, Design Shanghai.
- Futures of the Real (keynote lecture), Goldsmiths, University of London.

==== 2019 ====
- Ericsson Unboxed: Creating culture in times of confinement (panel discussion)

==== 2020 ====
- 5G: Creating culture in times of confinement, May 2020, Ericsson Unboxed
- The Immersive Art Revolution, BFI London Film Festival 2020
- New Heritage, Art In Flux, National Gallery X, July 23, 2020
- Gender*uck, National Gallery X,

==== 2021 ====
- Agile Bureaucracy and a New Renaissance, Sep, 2021, Creative Bureaucracy Festival, Berlin
- Groupthink, Sep, 2021, Ars Electronica Festival
- What can science offer the arts?, Nov, 2021, Medi-Culture Festival, London
- What an AI Sees, Jun, 2021, Trusting Machines Conference, London
- The First: Conversation with Luca Viganò, Jun, 2021, Trusting Machines Conference, Londo
- Adaptive Architecture, Mar 2021, Institute for Psychiatry, Psychology and Neuroscience, King's College London
- Can Machines Come Alive? What biology tells us about AI., June, 2021, Trusting Machines Conference, London
- The 5G Museum, VRHAM REAL-IN Festival, June 2021

== Productions and artistic work ==
Hossaini's productions have been featured in the Whitney Biennial, the Tribeca Film Festival, Brooklyn Academy of Music and other venues.

=== Notable works ===
==== Ouroboros ====
Hossaini's Ouroboros treats the history of the universe as an animated visual poem. The first iteration of the work was presented at the Ise Cultural Foundation Ise Cultural Foundation in Soho, New York in 2010. In a review for The New York Times, Dennis Overbye remarked that the work "bypass the rational part of the brain and head[s] straight for someplace deeper, to make us experience the universe not as a concatenation of forces but as a poem."

Constructed of an hour of looping animations, and it uses Chromodepth technology to create strongly holographic images that remain sharp without glasses. It has been installed in Beijing at the Museum of the Central Academy of Fine Arts, the Museum of Outdoor Art in Denver and other locations.

=== Artwork and exhibitions ===
==== 2007 ====
- Living Voom, curated selection of LAB productions, Scanners Film Festival, The Lincoln Center
- Curated selection of LAB productions, Borderlines Festival, Beijing, China
- Unperception Now, Janos Gat Gallery, New York City
- Curated selection of LAB productions, SF Cinemateque, San Francisco
- Curated selection of LAB productions, Pacific Film Archive, Berkeley, California
- Curated selection of LAB productions, Orchard 47, New York City
- Jeanne Moreau & Isabelle Huppert Video Portraits, Couvent des Cordeliers, Paris

==== 2008 ====
- Divine Machines, film, The Hackney Empire, London, UK
- Epiphany, video installation, American Museum of the Moving Image, New York City
- Noumema, Time is the Moving Image & The Same River, short plays, Water Mill Center for the Arts
- Installation of productions from LAB, American Museum of the Moving Image, New York City
- Curated selection of LAB productions, Scope Art Fair, New York City
- Unperception Now, film, Montreal Festival of Film on Art, Montreal, Canada

==== 2009 ====
- Baghdad Transcendental, sculpture & photography installation, The Drop, New York City
- Epiphany: Prints, The Kaufman Arcade, New York City
- Epiphany: Volcano, Gallery 8, New York City

==== 2010 ====
- Memory Begins, video installation, White Box, New York City
- Ouroboros, video installation, Ise Cultural Foundation, New York City
- Oceanic Verses, operatic video, New York City Opera
- Caro Ben Mio, live video, Galapagos Art Space, New York City

==== 2011 ====
- Fabric of Life, solo show of prints & video, Ethan Cohen Fine Arts, New York City
- Executive Privilege, video installation, White Box, New York City
- Fading Civilizations, video triptych, SoundRes Festival, Lecce, Italy
- The Aging Magician, musical theater, The Kitchen, New York City
- Fading Civilizations, video triptych, The Kitchen, New York City
- Ouroboros, video installation, Museum of Outdoor Art, Denver, Colorado
- Memory Begins, video installation, SudLab, Naples, Italy

==== 2012 ====
- Illusory Production, video installation, CAFA Museum, Beijing, China
- Epiphany, video installation, Mediations Biennale, Poznan, Poland
- Ouroboros, video installation, Clews Foundation, Denver, Colorado
- Oceanic Verses, video installation & live performance, The Kennedy Center, Washington, DC
- Ouroboros, video installation, Clews Foundation, Denver, Colorado
- Oceanic Verses, video installation & live performance, River to River Festival, New York City
- Ouroboros, video installation, Clews Foundation, Denver, Colorado
- Hermetica, video screening, Electronic Art Intermix, New York City
- Divine Machines, Museum of Optography, Sharjah

==== 2013 ====
- Oceanic Verses, video installation & live performance, The Barbican, London, UK

==== 2014 ====
- Oceanic Verses, video installation & live performance, Dillon Gallery, New York

==== 2015 ====
- Epiphany, video installation & live performance, BAM, New York

"Epiphany: the Cycle of Life" was made by Hossaini, composer Paola Prestini, librettist Niloufar Talebi and choral master Francisco Nunez Produced for the Brooklyn Academy of Music. The multi-media experience attempted to re-imagine the concert-going experience by employing interactive methods to explore the relationship between performers and observers, the limits of the human voice, and the possibilities of music and image. Hossaini writes that he began working on the performance in 2006 and it was irrevocably formed by the experience of being with his mother as she died. As a result, the performance can be interpreted as imagining his mother's passage from life to death:

"It is a cycle of artworks where each version involves composers, performers, designers and others who respond freely to my mother's story. Epiphany celebrates all our mothers and the vital forces that run from them through us and into the next generations of life."

==== 2016 ====
- Ouroboros, video installation, Art for Tomorrow, Doha, Qatar

==== 2017 ====
- Ouroboros, Video Installation, Click Festival, Helsingør, Denmark
- Why It's Kicking Off Everywhere, Video Director, Young Vic, London

==== 2018 ====
- Epiphany, Video Installation, Guildhall, London, 2018
- 4 Monkeys, Video Triptych, Galerie W, Paris, 2018

== Filmography ==
1986

- Sometimes a Blessing Can Be a Curse, director
- Ich bin Du, director
- Pentagram, director

1995

- Come to Me, director

2002

- artTV, director
- Abstraction 1, director
- Abstraction 2, director

2004

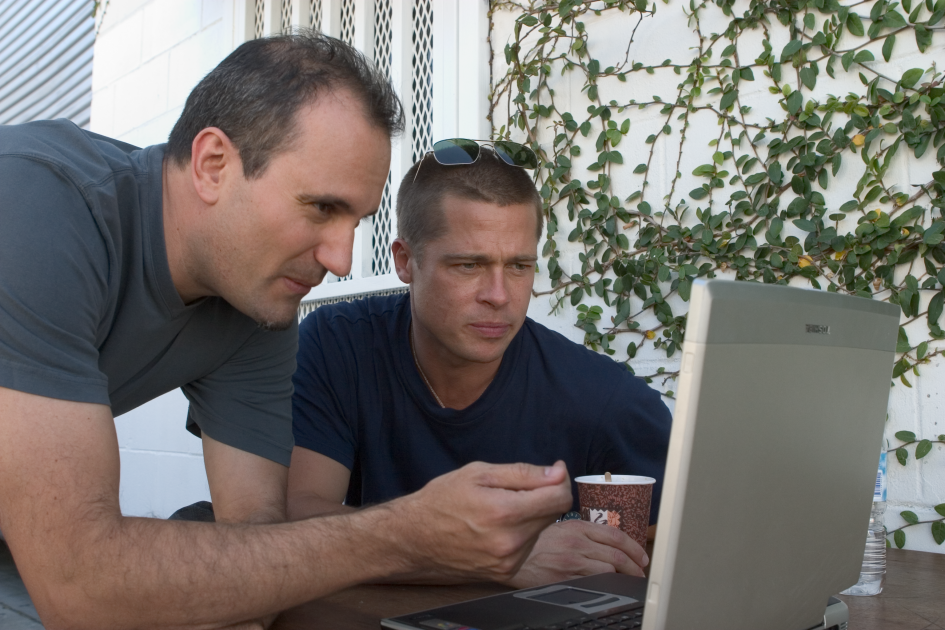
- Ali Hossaini & Brad Pitt filming the Brad Pitt video Portrait
  Video Portrait: Brad Pitt at IMDb, director: Robert Wilson, executive producer: Ali Hossaini, producer Noah Khoshbin
- Video Portrait: Robert Downey Jr., director: Robert Wilson, executive producer: Ali Hossaini, producer Noah Khoshbin
- Video Portrait: Jeanne Moreau, director: Robert Wilson, executive producer: Ali Hossaini, producer Noah Khoshbin
- Video Portrait: Isabelle Huppert, director: Robert Wilson, executive producer: Ali Hossaini, producer Noah Khoshbin
- Video Portrait: Juliette Binoche, director: Robert Wilson, executive producer: Ali Hossaini, producer Noah Khoshbin
- Video Portrait: Marianne Faithfull, director: Robert Wilson, executive producer: Ali Hossaini, producer Noah Khoshbin
- Video Portrait: Zhang Huan, director: Robert Wilson, executive producer: Ali Hossaini, producer Noah Khoshbin
- Video Portrait: Steve Buscemi, director: Robert Wilson, executive producer: Ali Hossaini, producer Noah Khoshbin
- Video Portrait: Mikhail Baryshnikov, director: Robert Wilson, executive producer: Ali Hossaini, producer Noah Khoshbin

2005

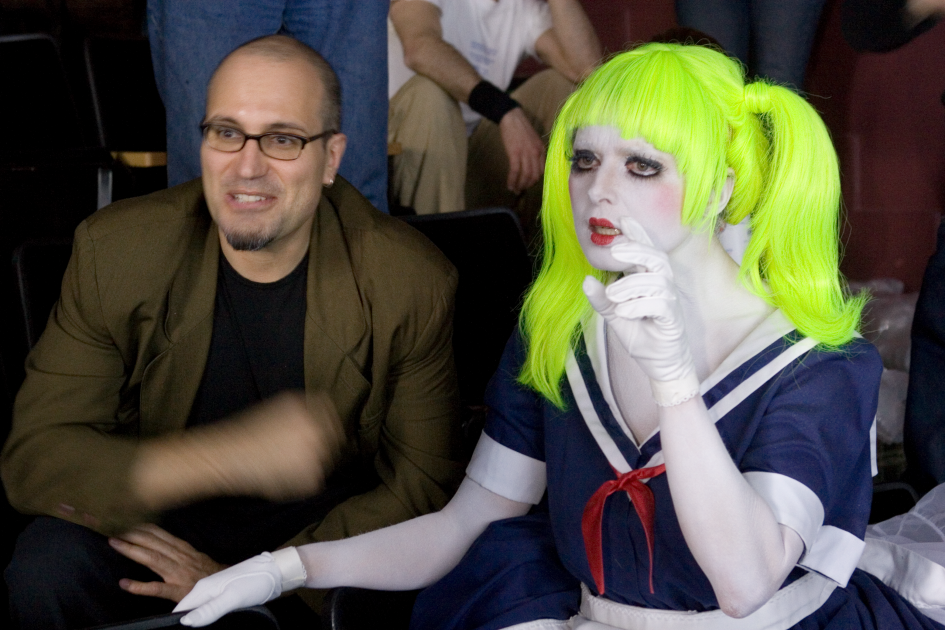
- Isabella Rossellini & Ali Hossaini on the set of her video portrait
  Video Portrait: Isabella Rossellini, director: Robert Wilson, executive producer: Ali Hossaini, producer Esther Gordon & Noah Khoshbin
- Video Portrait: Sean Penn, director: Robert Wilson, executive producer: Ali Hossaini, producer Esther Gordon & Noah Khoshbin
- Video Portrait: Willem Dafoe, director: Robert Wilson, executive producer: Ali Hossaini, producer Esther Gordon & Noah Khoshbin
- Video Portrait: Robin Wright Penn, director: Robert Wilson, executive producer: Ali Hossaini, producer Esther Gordon & Noah Khoshbin
- Video Portrait: J T Leroy, director: Robert Wilson, executive producer: Ali Hossaini, producer Esther Gordon & Noah Khoshbin
- Video Portrait: William Pope L, director: Robert Wilson, executive producer: Ali Hossaini, producer Esther Gordon & Noah Khoshbin
- Video Portrait: Gabriella Orenstein, director: Robert Wilson, executive producer: Ali Hossaini, producer Esther Gordon & Noah Khoshbin
- Video Portrait: Lucinda Childs, director: Robert Wilson, executive producer: Ali Hossaini, producer Esther Gordon & Noah Khoshbin

2006

- Epiphany: The Cycle of Life at IMDb, experimental feature, director: Ali Hossaini
- Unperception Now, director: Ali Hossaini
- Video Portrait: Princess Caroline: of Monaco, director: Robert Wilson, executive producer: * Ali Hossaini, producer Esther Gordon & Noah Khoshbin
- Video Portrait: Queen Farah Diba, director: Robert Wilson, executive producer: Ali Hossaini, producer Esther Gordon & Noah Khoshbin
- Video Portrait: Prince Alexis Schleswig-Holstein, director: Robert Wilson, executive producer: Ali Hossaini, producer Esther Gordon & Noah Khoshbin
- Video Portrait: Gao Xingjian, director: Robert Wilson, executive producer: Ali Hossaini, producer Esther Gordon & Noah Khoshbin
- Rite of the Black Sun, director: Bradley Eros, executive producer: Ali Hossaini, producer: Lili Chin
- The Aquarium, director: Pavel Wojtasik, executive producer: Ali Hossaini, producer: Lili Chin
- The Landfill, director: Pavel Wojtasik, executive producer: Ali Hossaini, producer: Lili Chin, HDTV
- Sahara Mohave, director: Leslie Thornton, executive producer: Ali Hossaini, producer: Lili Chin
- Portrait of Shanghai, director: Lili Chin, HDTV, experimental short
- Sorry, director: Gail Vachon, executive producer: Ali Hossaini, producer: Lili Chin
- Meredith Salient Field, director: Theo Angell, executive producer: Ali Hossaini, producer: Lili Chin
- Spectropia (episode), director: Toni Dove
- 25 Letters (3 episodes), director: Grahame Weinbren, executive producer: Ali Hossaini, producer: Lili Chin
- The Tension Building, director: Erika Beckman, executive producer: Ali Hossaini, producer: Lili Chin
- The Mythmakers, directors: Sabine Gruffat & Ben Russell, executive producer: Ali Hossaini, producer: Lili Chin
- Poem, director: Mary Lucier, executive producer: Ali Hossaini, producer: Lili Chin, HDTV
- Light Mood Disorder, director: Jennifer Reeves, executive producer: Ali Hossaini, producer: Lili Chin
- The Bridge, director: Fred Taylor, executive producer: Ali Hossaini, producer: Lili Chin
- Urban Sonata, director: Jud Yalkut, executive producer: Ali Hossaini, producer: Lili Chin
- Stiff, director: Jenny Reeder, executive producer: Ali Hossaini, producer: Lili Chin
- Carrara Landscape, director: Angie Eng, executive producer: Ali Hossaini, producer: Lili Chin
- The Shadow Lords, director: Jose Figeroa, executive producer: Ali Hossaini, producer: Lili Chin

2007

- Medicine Woman, 13 x 30' HDTV series, executive producer: Ali Hossaini
- Ultimate Tourist Scams, 13 x 30' HDTV series, executive producer: Ali Hossaini
- Wildlife Nannies, 20 x 30' HDTV series, executive producer: Ali Hossaini
- Penny Revolution, 6 x 60' HDTV series, executive producer: Ali Hossaini
- Green Wheels, 13 x 30' HDTV series, executive producer: Ali Hossaini
- Video Portrait: Renée Fleming, director: Robert Wilson, HDTV, experimental short, executive producer: Ali Hossaini
- Video Portrait: Skunk, director: Robert Wilson, HDTV, experimental short, executive producer: Ali Hossaini

2008

- Mario's Green House, 8 x 30' HDTV series, director: Mario Van Peebles, executive producer: Ali Hossaini
- The Monkey Thieves, 13 x 30' HDTV series, executive producer: Ali Hossaini
- Lost in China, 6 x 60' HDTV series, executive producer: Ali Hossaini
- Wildlife Nannies 2, 20 x 30' HDTV series, executive producer: Ali Hossaini
- Earthtripping, 6 x 30' HDTV series, executive producer: Ali Hossaini
- Natural Born Traveler, 4 x 30' HDTV series, executive producer: Ali Hossaini
- 4Monkeys, multichannel video installation, artist: Ali Hossaini
- The River, theater and video, writer: Ali Hossaini
- Noumena, theater and video, writer: Ali Hossaini
- Time is the Moving Image, theater and video, writer: Ali Hossaini
- Beethoven's Toothpaste, experimental video, director: Camille Morin, executive producer: Ali Hossaini
- Wildlife Nannies II, 20 x 30' HDTV series, executive producer: Ali Hossaini

2009

- KOOL: Dancing in My Mind, 3D HD feature, director: Robert Wilson, executive producer: Ali Hossaini

2012

- Story/Time, 3D HD feature, director: Bill T Jones, producer: Ali Hossaini

== Engineering Standardisation Practice ==
Hossaini's practice has led him to help produce consolidated standards to help promote the effective, ethical, creative and considered creation of AI systems, complex systems and system design. These include:

=== IEEE 7000-2021 - IEEE Standard Model Process for Addressing Ethical Concerns during System Design ===
This is a set of processes by which organizations can include consideration of ethical values throughout the stages of concept exploration and development is established by this standard. Management and engineering in transparent communication with selected stakeholders for ethical values elicitation and prioritization is supported by this standard, involving traceability of ethical values through an operational concept, value propositions, and value dispositions in the system design. Processes that provide for traceability of ethical values in the concept of operations, ethical requirements, and ethical risk-based design are described in the standard. All sizes and types of organizations using their own life cycle models are relevant to this standard.

=== IEEE 7001-2021 - IEEE Approved Draft Standard for Transparency of Autonomous Systems ===
The aim of this standard is to describe measurable, testable levels of transparency, so that autonomous systems can be objectively assessed and levels of compliance determined.

=== IEEE 2731 - Standard for a Unified Terminology for Brain-Computer Interfaces ===
The standard establishes terminologies and definitions used in the description of Brain-Computer Interfaces.

== Select Peer-Review Publications (Incl Standardisation Work) ==
- A Functional BCI Model by the P2731 working group: Physiology, Hossaini, A., Valeriani D., Nam C. S., Ferrante, R., Mufti Mahmud M., 5 Sep 2021, Brain Computer Interfaces
- Modelling the Threat from AI: Putting Agency on the Agenda, Hossaini, A., 29 Nov 2019, RUSI Journal
- The AI Special Issue: An Introduction, Dear, K., Hossaini, A., 29 Nov 2019, RUSI Journal
- A functional BCI model by the P2731 working group: control interface, Easttom, C., Bianchi, L., Nam, C. S., Hossaini, A., Zapala, D., 8 Dec 2021, Brain Computer Interfaces
- A Functional Model for Unifying Brain Computer Interface Terminology, Easttom, C., Bianchi, L., Davide Valeriani, D., Chang S. Nam, Hossaini, A., Zapała, D., Roman-Gonzalez, A., Singh, A. K., Antonietti, A., Sahonero-Alvarez, G., and Balachandran, P., 17 March 2021, IEEE Open Journal of Engineering in Medicine and Biology
- A functional BCI model by the P2731 working group: Psychology, Zapała, D., Hossaini, A., Kianpour, M., Sahonero-Alvarez, G., Ayesh, A., 22 Jun 2021, Brain Computer Interfaces
- The BCI Glossary: a first proposal for a community review, Antonietti, A., Balachandran, P., Hossaini A., Hu Y., Valeriani, D., 3 Sep 2021, Brain Computer Interfaces
- The Manual of Digital Museum Planning, Hossaini, A., Blankenberg, N., Lord, G. D., Michaels, C., 1 Apr 2017, ISBN 1442278951
