= Robert Punkenhofer =

Austrian architect

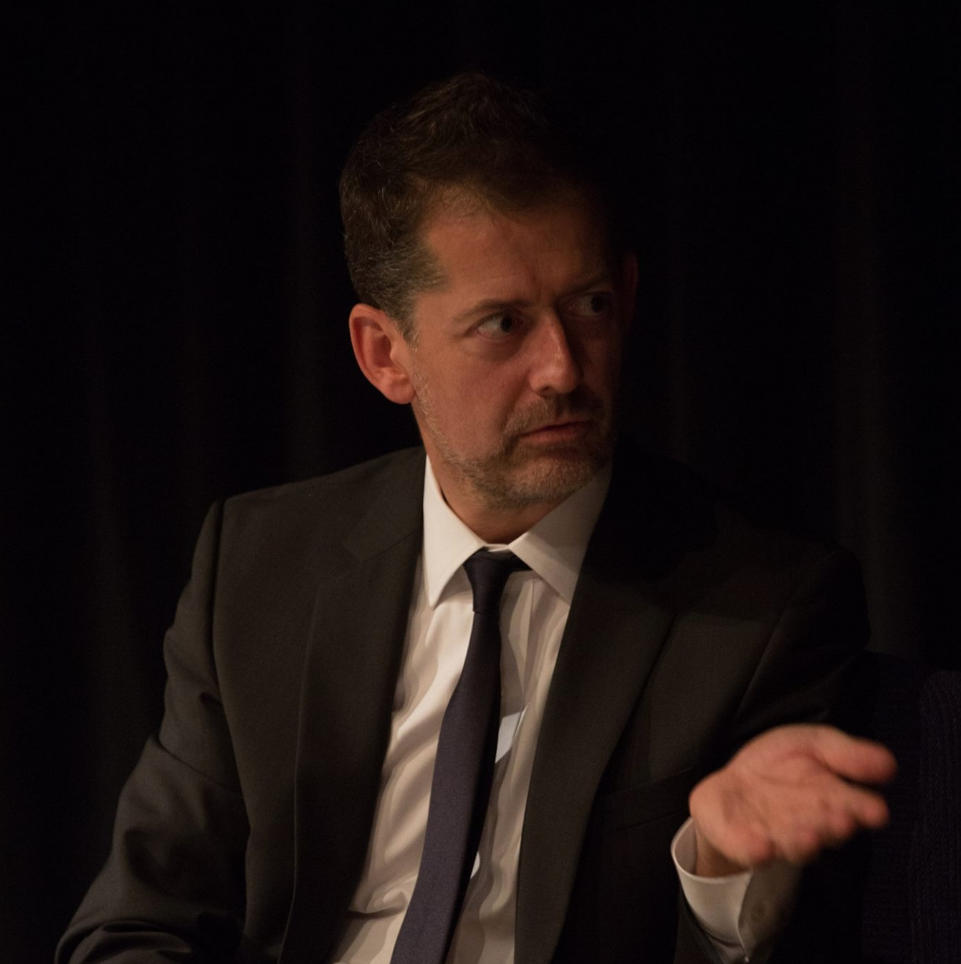
- Robert Punkenhofer
- Born: Robert Punkenhofer; 1965 (age 60–61); Vienna, Austria

Robert Punkenhofer (born July 7, 1965, in Austria) His career intertwines art, design and architecture as well as international business development. He served as the Austrian Trade Commissioner in Barcelona, a job he has also performed in Mexico City, Berlin and New York City.

== Education ==
Punkenhofer was awarded a doctorate in 1991 and LL.M specialized in international comparative law at the Karl Franzens University of Graz, Austria. He made his postgraduate studies at the Law Faculty at the Venezuelan University Universidad Católica Andres Bello in Caracas. Two years later he attended New York University and earned a Master of Arts degree in Arts Administration specialized in museum management. In addition he has been part of the Guggenheim Foundation's internship program, worked at Exit Art and the Lycée Honoré Romane in France as a language assistant.

== Career ==
Punkenhofer is the Founder and managing director of ART&IDEA since 1995, an agency that organizes contemporary art, design, architecture, and fashion programs internationally. Since its inception, ART & IDEA has hosted more than 100 exhibitions around the world.

=== Teaching ===
Punkenhofer teaches as guest professor at New York University in the International Leadership Program in Visual Arts Management (ILPVAM) and is a member of the International Advisory Board of Princeton University in the Program in Latin American Studies.

== Publications ==
Building an Island Vito Acconci / Acconci Studio (book, Hatje Cantz, 2003, ISBN 978-3-7757-1357-3 )

A Way Beyond Creative Industries (book, Folio Verlag, 2010, ISBN 978-3852565132

Art & Idea Anniversary Publication (book, Hatje Cantz, 2007, ISBN 978-3-7757-2001-4 )

=== Contributions to publications ===
- Lord, Gail Dexter; Blankenberg, Ngaire, eds. Cities, Museums and Soft Power (book, The AAM Press, 2015, ISBN 978-1941963036
- The apexart Fellowship: An Experiment in Vertical Cultural Integration (book, Apexart Publishing, 2016, ISBN 978-1-933347-94-3
- American Playgrounds: Revitalizing Community Space (book, University Press of New England, 2005, ISBN 978-1-58465-517-6 )
