= The Site =

US television program

- Logo of The Site
- Presented by: Soledad O'Brien
- Country of origin: United States
- Original language: English

Production
- Production companies: Ziff-Davis Television; MSNBC

Original release
- Network: MSNBC
- Release: July 15, 1996 – August 18, 1997

The Site is an hour-long television program devoted to the Internet revolution. It debuted in July 1996 with MSNBC's launch, and aired Monday through Saturday, reaching 35 million homes. Soledad O'Brien hosted The Site, along with her animated co-host Dev Null, voiced by Leo Laporte.

The Site covered technology in all forms, from technical aspects to news and culture. The show was sometimes billed as "the Net's evening news". and advertised with the tagline "The Revolution Will Be Televised." Guests included musical artists, authors and columnists, who spoke about the impact of technology on their work.

== History ==
The NBC News executive in charge of creating The Site was David Bohrman, who was also the network's Executive Producer of Special Events and Breaking News. Bohrman was sent out to San Francisco to create and launch the program. His hiring of O'Brien is described in her book, The Next Big Story: My Journey Through the Land of Possibilities. The idea of Dev Null was also Bohrman's (after experimenting with virtual set technology at NBC the year before). Leo Laporte wore a motion suit, had an IFB earpiece, so he could hear O'Brien, and his animated image was rendered in real-time by an Onyx SGI computer. The artwork for Dev was designed by Protozoa.

The Site won many awards and was named the best broadcast on internet and high technology. It also was the first television show to have an award-winning website. One reviewer hailed The Site as the best program on the fledgling MSNBC. The show gained Soledad O'Brien Internet fame and the nickname "Goddess of the Geeks." while Lloyd Grove in The Washington Post dubbed her "television's first cyberbabe."

The Site was preempted for two weeks in favour of news programs during the death of Diana, Princess of Wales during September 1997. That month, program creator Ziff Davis and MSNBC jointly announced that The Site had been canceled as it no longer fit into the network's increasing all-news format. The Site was reincarnated as The Screen Savers less than one year later, hosted by Leo Laporte beginning with the launch in May 1998 of the new cable network ZDTV (Ziff-Davis Television), until its cancellation after the takeover by Comcast.

Soledad O'Brien chatted with virtual character Dev Null (Leo Laporte) in a nightly segment on The Site.

The Site was a forerunner to the 24-hour technology channel ZDTV, later renamed TechTV, which merged to become G4. After The Site was cancelled by MSNBC, and the show's staff were rehired by the parent company, Ziff-Davis, to launch ZDTV. The new channel was devoted to digital technology, and it was substantially an extension of the themes presented by The Site. The channel gained in popularity and was rebranded to TechTV in 2000.

== Key contributors and on-air regulars ==
Cliff Stoll, Denise Caruso, Leo Laporte, John C. Dvorak, Matthew Hawn, John Gilles, Ali Hossaini, Shauna Sampson David Bohrman and animated character Dev Null. Broadcast designers Victoria Webb, Susan Roderick and Executive Producer Nancy Juliber were integral to the on-air team, winning several BDA awards for work. Richard Stutting was Art Director for the award-winning website. Victoria Webb enlisted 3RingCircus to provide the network package for ZDTV.

A nightly five-minute unscripted segment in which O'Brien engaged in spontaneous tech talk with a virtual reality cartoon character, Dev Null, was animated in real time on Silicon Graphics computers. The character was in fact ZDTV journalist Leo Laporte, who did the voice and actions while wearing a motion capture suit. When O'Brien sat at an espresso bar to read email from viewers, Dev Null flirted with her while answering her computer questions. She recalled, "One of the reasons that segment of the show worked is that I could not see him as I was talking to him, and the segment was unscripted. He was funny, and his jokes were not gags."

Producers on The Site, many of whom got their start in television there, eventually became executives at other innovative channels, including LinkTV, Oxygen Media, G4 and LAB HD.

== Regular writers and columnists ==
Richard Kadrey, Kevin Poulsen; Joel Deane, John Gilles, Ali Hossaini, Matthew Hawn, Kevin Kennis (Kevin the Kid Tester), Shauna Sampson, and Clifford Stoll

== Executive producers ==
Kathy Moore, Suzanne Stefanac
