= Dev Null =

Animated character in "The Site" television series

Dev Null was an animated virtual reality character created in 1996 by Leo Laporte for MSNBC's computer and technology TV series The Site. Espresso barista Dev talked with host Soledad O'Brien each weeknight in a five-minute segment. Laporte was awarded a 1997 Northern California Emmy for his nightly performances as cyber character Dev Null.

== Background and history ==
Dev was animated in real time on a million-dollar Silicon Graphics Onyx computer. Laporte generated both the voice and actions while wearing a VR motion capture suit. When O'Brien sat at the espresso bar to read email from viewers, Dev flirted with her while answering her computer questions. She recalled, "One of the reasons that segment of the show worked is that I could not see him as I was talking to him, and the segment was unscripted. He was funny, and his jokes were not gags."

While O'Brien looked at a piece of tape on the wall indicating Dev's virtual position, the VR suit captured Laporte's actions, and a computer program translated his body movements to create the character, while other human operators controlled facial expressions and accentuated movements of his hair. The control room juxtaposed O'Brien and Dev on the same set using a switcher.

Laporte recalled arriving at NBC with a 90-page treatment:

I'll never forget pitching it to NBC at 30 Rock just before Christmas 1995. Then NBC News Director Andrew Lack came in in a three-piece suit and cowboy boots. He propped his booted feet up on the table and said, "Okay, let's hear it." It was like something out of Seinfeld... I had hoped to be the lead reporter on the show, but the NBC executives told me I had no chance of getting on camera, so they stuck me in a VR suit and the character Dev Null was born. I won an Emmy for it, but the only other competition was a sock puppet character on the local Spanish language station, so it wasn't exactly a competitive category... The Site was a major network's idea of what a technology TV show should look like: big on production values, light on content, but it was an important moment in the mainstreaming of the Internet. I still run into people now and then who remember me as "the guy in the suit."

Producer David Bohrman remembered, "She would do real-time Q&A with this cartoon character who was the smartest person in the world when it came to technology issues. It was great."

== See also ==
- /dev/null is a special file in Unix-like operating systems that discards all data written to it

== Watch ==
- Dev Null and Soledad O'Brien on The Site (June 10, 1997)
