= CNN/YouTube presidential debates =

Series of televised debates sponsored by CNN and YouTube

The CNN/YouTube presidential debates were a series of televised debates held during the 2008 Republican Party and Democratic Party presidential primaries that were sponsored by CNN and YouTube. In the debates presidential primary candidates who were invited to the debate and still had active campaigns at the debates airing. participated and fielded questions submitted through YouTube. The Democratic Party installment took place in Charleston, South Carolina and aired on July 23, 2007. The Republican Party installment took place in St. Petersburg, Florida and aired on November 28, 2007.

== History ==
The CNN/YouTube Debates were conceived of by David Bohrman, the Washington Bureau Chief of CNN, and Steve Grove, the Head of News and Politics at YouTube. YouTube was a new platform on the political scene, rising to prominence in the 2006 midterm elections after Senator George Allen's Macaca Controversy, in which the Senator was captured calling his opponent Jim Webb's campaign worker a "Macaca" on video, which went viral on YouTube and damaged a campaign that narrowly lost at the polls. Media companies were looking for new ways to harness the possibilities of web video and YouTube was looking for opportunities to give its users access to the national political stage, so Bohrman and Grove formed a unique partnership in the CNN/YouTube Debates. It was the first-ever web-to-television debate partnership.

== Democratic debate ==
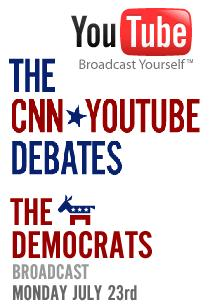

=== Introduction ===
A man named Chris from Portland, Oregon introduced the debate in a YouTube video. He challenged the candidates at the debate (Hillary Clinton, Barack Obama, Joe Biden, Mike Gravel, Chris Dodd, Dennis Kucinich, Bill Richardson, and John Edwards) to "actually answer the questions" instead of "beating around the bush". Moderator, Anderson Cooper, stepped in and discussed why many of the video questions were not selected, even showing the most popular video, made by YouTube celebrity Tony Huynh, better known as TheWineKone. After that, more video questions were shown and the candidates answered them.

=== Questions ===
Here are the video questions that were directed at each candidate. Sometimes, the questions were asked to one candidate, multiple candidates, or all candidates. Moderator Anderson Cooper opened questions directed at one candidate to specific additional candidates. Cooper also sometimes allowed candidates to respond if they were mentioned or addressed in another response.

==== Questions for Senator Biden ====
1. If you had to pick any Republican member of Congress or Republican governor to be your running mate, who would it be? [Biden chose Richard Lugar or Chuck Hagel].
2. Senator Biden, in the past, you've talked about NATO troops. What about American troops? (Anderson Cooper, Senator Gravel also had a response)
3. I have two questions. By what date after January 21, 2009, will all U.S. troops be out of Iraq? And how many family members do you have serving in uniform?
4. Who was your favorite teacher and why? (Sheena Currell, South Carolina)
5. Senator Biden, everyone on this stage who was in Congress in 2001 voted for No Child Left Behind. Would you scrap it or revise it? (Anderson Cooper)

==== Questions for Senator Clinton ====
1. Mrs. Clinton, how would you define the word "liberal?" And would you use this word to describe yourself? (Rob Porter, Irvine, California)
2. Whenever I read an editorial about one of you, the author never fails to mention the issue of race or gender, respectively. Either one is not authentically black enough, or the other is not satisfactorily feminine. How will you address these critics and their charges if one or both of you should end up on the Democratic ticket in '08? (Jordan Williams, Coffeyville, Kansas)
3. Senator Clinton, is he [Edwards] a better advocate for women? (Anderson Cooper)
4. Should American troops go to Darfur? (Anderson Cooper)
5. Just in the spirit of trying to get the answer, does that mean no American ground troops? (Anderson Cooper)
6. Senator Clinton, do you think women should register for Selective Service? (Anderson Cooper)
7. This question is to Senator Hillary Clinton. The Arab states, Muslim nations, believe its women as being second-class citizens. If you're president of the United States, how do you feel that you would even be taken seriously by these states in any kind of talks, negotiations, or any other diplomatic relations? I feel that is a legitimate question. (John McAlpherin, Okinawa, Japan)
8. In the spirit of that type of bold leadership, would you be willing to meet separately, without precondition, during the first year of your administration, in Washington or anywhere else, with the leaders of Iran, Syria, Venezuela, Cuba, and North Korea, in order to bridge the gap that divides our countries?
9. With Bush, Clinton, and Bush again serving as the last three presidents, how would electing you, a Clinton, constitute the type of change in Washington so many people in the heartland are yearning for, and what your campaign has been talking about? I was also wondering if any of the other candidates had a problem with the same two families being in charge of the executive branch of government for 28 consecutive years, if Hillary Clinton were to potentially be elected and then re-elected.

==== Questions for Senator Dodd ====
1. Senator Dodd, you've been in Congress more than 30 years. Can you honestly say you're any different? (Zack Kemph, Provo, Utah)
2. Do you believe the response in the wake of Hurricane Katrina would have been different if the storm hit an affluent, predominantly white city? What roles do you believe race and class played in the storm's aftermath? And if you acknowledge that race and class affected the response efforts, what can you do to ensure that this won't happen in the future? And what can you do to ensure this nation's most needy people, in times of crisis and always, something will be done to help them too? (Morgan G., Atlanta, Georgia)
3. If you were elected president of the United States, would you allow us to be married to each other? (Mary and Jen, Brooklyn, New York)
4. Should women register for selective service when they turn 18 like men do currently? (originally asked Tony Fuller, Wilson, Ohio)
5. I have two questions. By what date after January 21, 2009, will all U.S. troops be out of Iraq? And how many family members do you have serving in uniform?
6. So my question for you is, how is the United States going to decrease its energy consumption in the first place? In other words, how will your policies influence Americans, rather than just using special light bulbs, to do this?
7. We all know that Social Security is running out of money, but people who earn over $97,500 stop paying into Social Security. What is up with that? (Nancy McDonald, Wilmington, Delaware)

==== Questions for Fmr. Senator Edwards ====
1. Senator Edwards? Any Republicans? (Anderson Cooper, goes along with the first question asked to Joe Biden)
2. Should African-Americans get reparations [for slavery]? (Will, Boston, Massachusetts)
3. Senator Edwards, earlier this week, your wife said that you would be a better advocate for women than Senator Clinton. Was she right? (Anderson Cooper)
4. Senator Edwards said his opposition to gay marriage is influenced by his Southern Baptist background. Most Americans agree it was wrong and unconstitutional to use religion to justify slavery, segregation, and denying women the right to vote. So why is it still acceptable to use religion to deny gay American their full and equal rights? (Reverend Reggie Longcrier, Hickory, North Carolina)
5. Senator Edwards, are the troops—did the troops in Vietnam die in vain? (Anderson Cooper)
6. Senator Edwards? (Selective Service question, Anderson Cooper)
7. My question is, we here at Planned Parenthood support comprehensive sex education and I'd like to know if any of you as candidates have talked to your children about sex and used medically accurate and age-appropriate information? (Anne, Pennsylvania)

==== Questions for Fmr. Senator Gravel ====
1. Senator Gravel, are you a liberal? (Anderson Cooper)
2. My question is for Mike Gravel. In one of the previous debates you said something along the lines of the entire deaths of Vietnam died in vain. How do you expect to win in a country where probably a pretty large chunk of the people voting disagree with that statement and might very well be offended by it? I'd like to know if you plan to defend that statement, or if you're just going to flip-flop. Thanks. (Don, West Virginia)
3. Senator Gravel? (Selective Service question, Anderson Cooper)
4. Who was your favorite teacher and why? (Sheena Currell, South Carolina)
5. So my question for you is, how is the United States going to decrease its energy consumption in the first place? In other words, how will your policies influence Americans, rather than just using special light bulbs, to do this?
6. Do you have a problem with it (Democratic Party)? (Anderson Cooper)

==== Questions for Congressman Kucinich ====
1. What do you have that Senator Clinton and Senator Obama do not have? (Davis Fleetwood, Groton, Massachusetts, Clinton and Obama also respond to this question)
2. If you were elected president of the United States, would you allow us to be married to each other? (Mary and Jen, Brooklyn, New York)
3. I have two questions. By what date after January 21, 2009, will all U.S. troops be out of Iraq? And how many family members do you have serving in uniform?
4. As president, what will you do to ensure that my son will live a full and happy life? This video question features an anthropomorphic snowman.
5. And I'd like to know, if the Democrats come into office, are my taxes going to rise like usually they do when a Democrats gets into office? (Marcus Benson, Minneapolis, Minnesota)

==== Questions for Senator Obama ====
1. Senator Obama, your position on reparations [for slavery]?
2. Whenever I read an editorial about one of you, the author never fails to mention the issue of race or gender, respectively. Either one is not authentically black enough, or the other is not satisfactorily feminine. How will you address these critics and their charges if one or both of you should end up on the Democratic ticket in '08? (Jordan Williams, Coffeyville, Kansas)
3. Senator Obama, the laws banning interracial marriage in the United States were ruled unconstitutional in 1967. What is the difference between a ban on interracial marriage and a ban on gay marriage? (Anderson Cooper)
4. Senator Obama, are the soldiers dying in Iraq in vain? (Anderson Cooper)
5. To the question of, did the troops—are the troops dying in vain, though: Yes or no? (Anderson Cooper)
6. Senator Obama, should women register for Selective Service? (Anderson Cooper)
7. In 1982, Anwar Sadat traveled to Israel, a trip that resulted in a peace agreement that has lasted ever since. In the spirit of that type of bold leadership, would you be willing to meet separately, without precondition, during the first year of your administration, in Washington or anywhere else, with the leaders of Iran, Syria, Venezuela, Cuba, and North Korea, in order to bridge the gap that divides our countries?
8. Who was your favorite teacher and why? (Sheena Currell, South Carolina)
9. Senator Obama, Mitt Romney has accused you this week of saying that 5-year-old children should be getting sex education. Was he right? (Anderson Cooper)
10. We all know that Social Security is running out of money, but people who earn over $97,500 stop paying into Social Security. What is up with that? (Nancy McDonald, Wilmington, Delaware)

==== Questions for Governor Richardson ====
1. If you were elected president of the United States, would you allow us to be married to each other? (Mary and Jen, Brooklyn, New York)
2. What action do you commit to that will get these children back home to a safe Darfur and not letting it be yet another empty promise? (Gabriel, refugee camp near Darfur)
3. You say U.N. troops. Does that mean American troops? (Anderson Cooper)
4. I have two questions. By what date after January 21, 2009, will all U.S. troops be out of Iraq? And how many family members do you have serving in uniform?
5. Is that even possible? Six months... (Anderson Cooper)
6. Governor Richardson, you have had to implement No Child Left Behind in your state. Would you scrap it? Revise it? (Anderson Cooper)
7. There are two solutions, both of which are politically unpopular: Raise taxes or cut benefits. Which would you choose, and how would you convince the public to support you?

==== Questions for all the candidates ====
1. My question for all the candidates: How do we pull out now? And the follow-up, are we watching the same blankin' war? I certainly wasn't a big fan of the invasion/liberation. It sickens me to hear about soldiers wounded and getting killed daily, not to mention innocent Iraqis, but how do we pull out now? The government's shaky; bombs daily. Don't you think if we pulled out now that would open it up for Iran and Syria, God knows who—Russia—how do we pull out now? And isn't it our responsibility to get these people up on their feet? I mean, do you leave a newborn baby to take care of himself? How do we pull out now? (Bary Mitchell, Philadelphia, Pennsylvania)
2. Hey, I'm Mike Green from Lexington, South Carolina. And I was wanting to ask all the nominees whether they would send their kids to public school or private school.
3. This here question's for all you candidates. Mainstream media seems awfully interested in old Al Gore these days. Is he losing weight? What's it say in his book? Is he still worried about all the ice? They interpret all these as signs that he may or may not run. They really want to know if Al Gore's going to run again. Yes. Well, what we want to know is does that hurt you-all's feelings? (Jackie Broyles and "Dunlap" of Red State Update, Murfreesboro, Tennessee)
4. How many people here have a private jet or a chartered jet to get here tonight? (Anderson Cooper)
5. There is a scientific consensus for man-caused climate change, and I've heard each of you talk in previous debates about alternative energy sources like solar or wind, but I have not heard any of you speak your opinion on nuclear power. I believe that nuclear power is safer, cleaner, and provides a quicker avenue to energy independence than other alternatives. I am curious what each of you believe. (Shawn, Ann Arbor, Michigan)
6. Don't you think that standardizing our voting practices will increase legitimacy, and possibly even voter turnout in our elections? What are you going to do to fix that? (Mellisa, San Luis Obispo, California)
7. My question to the candidates: If you're elected to serve, would you be willing to do this service for the next four years and be paid the national minimum wage? (Cecilla Smith and Asanti Wilkins, Pennsylvania)
8. My taxes put some kids in college I can't afford to send myself. Now, tell me, if you were elected president, what would you do to help?
9. What are you prepared to do to fight this disease (Alzheimer's disease) now?
10. What I'd like to know is, how do each of you plan on addressing chronic disease and preventative health in your health care plans? I would like my mother to be around to see her grandchildren.
11. What would you as president do to make low-cost or free preventive medicine available for everybody in this country? Thank you.
12. To all the candidates, tell me your position on gun control, as myself and other Americans really want to know if our babies are safe. This is my baby, purchased under the 1994 gun ban. Please tell me your views. Thank you. (Jered Townsend, Clio, Michigan)
13. What's to like and dislike about the candidate to your left? (Jason Koop, Colorado Springs, Colorado)

=== Post-debate ===
==== Reaction ====
After the debate ended, CNN interviewed their focus groups, and they thought that Barack Obama was the candidate who most understood their issues.

==== Ratings ====
In an article published by Reuters, Nielsen Media Research indicated that the Democratic debate delivered the highest Nielsen ratings of any debate broadcast on a cable news network among adults 18–34. The debate had an average of 2.6 million viewers, which makes it the second-most-watched debate of the 2007 television season. The Manchester, New Hampshire Democratic Debate that was held on June 3, 2007, received 2.8 million viewers.

==== Clinton and Obama controversy ====
Senator Clinton and Senator Obama quarreled with one another in post-debate memos over whether it would be suitable for them to meet with world leaders considered by some hostile to the U.S., among them Fidel Castro, Kim Jong-il, and Hugo Chavez. A memo issued by a Hillary Clinton presidential campaign spokesman stated that Obama said he would meet with some of the world's worst dictators during his first year of office without preconditions. Obama's campaign said that Obama's method "is exactly the kind of change and new thinking that excites voters about an Obama presidency." The two candidates also argued over who won the overall debate.

On July 26, 2007, in a speech made in Concord, New Hampshire, Senator Obama stated that he did not want "Bush–Cheney Lite", referring to Senator Clinton.

==== Criticism ====
Media following the event expressed mixed feelings about whether or not the questions were 'tough' or pertinent enough. Some analysts expressed criticism of the candidates responses, and the format itself pointing to the lack of follow up questions. During the debate, presidential candidate Mike Gravel questioned whether the debate was "fair" or not and complained due to a lack of airtime. In a Newsweek article written by Brian Braiker, he indicated that many YouTube users would have preferred that CNN select the most popular video questions.

== Republican debate ==
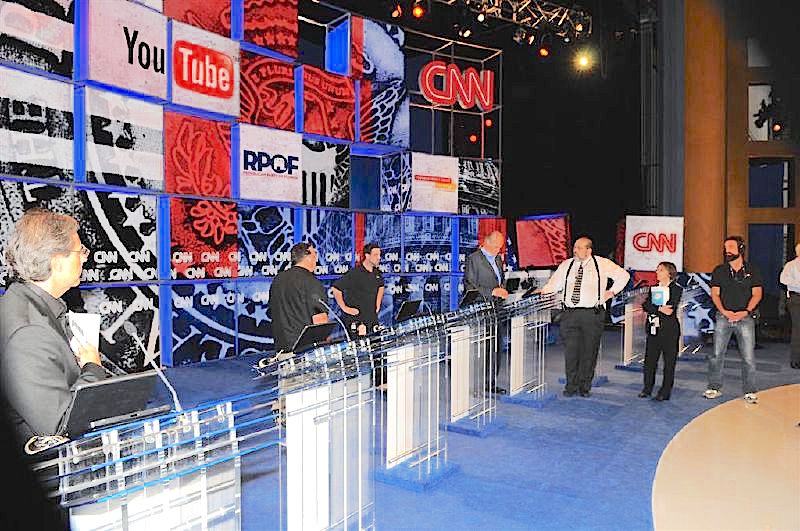
The CNN/YouTube Republican Debate on 28 November 2007

=== Introduction ===
All candidates who still had active primary campaigns at the time of the debates airing participated except for Alan Keyes who was not invited. Florida Republican Party Chairman Jim Greer introduced the then governor of Florida, Charlie Crist. The governor then gave a brief introduction before turning the debate over to moderator Anderson Cooper.

=== Questions ===
1. This is Ernie Nardi from Dyker Heights in Brooklyn, New York, with a question for the ex-Mayor Giuliani. Under your administration, as well as others, New York City was operated as a sanctuary city, aiding and abetting illegal aliens. I would like to know, if you become president of the United States, will you continue to aid and abett the flight of illegal aliens into this country?
2. Good evening. There are thousands of people in Canada and Mexico waiting to come to America legally. They want to become American citizens. They want to be part of the American dream. Yet, there are those in the Senate that want to grant amnesty for those that come here illegally. Will you pledge tonight, if elected president, to veto any immigration bill that involves amnesty for those that have come here illegally? Thank you.
3. Hammered by competition with imports, our family-owned business struggles each year to find seasonal workers. We've been working with a seasonal guest worker program, the H-2B program, bringing in and sending home workers every year. But with Congress failing to enact a comprehensive immigration and guest worker bill, I want to know whether I'll have a job next year. What are you going to do to keep these guest workers coming to the U.S. to save our business?
4. Governor Huckabee, while governor of Arkansas, you gave an illegal aliens a discount for college in Arkansas by allow them to pay lower in-state tuition rates. However, we have thousands of military members currently serving our country in Iraq with children at home. If these children chose to move to Arkansas to attend college, they would have to pay three times the tuition rate that illegal aliens pay. Would you support a federal law which would require any state that gives these tuition rates to illegal aliens to give the same rates to the children of our military members?
5. Good evening, candidates. This is Seekster from Arlington, Texas, and this question is for Ron Paul. I've met a lot of your supporters online, but I've noticed that a good number of them seem to buy into this conspiracy theory regarding the Council of Foreign Relations, and some plan to make a North American union by merging the United States with Canada and Mexico. These supporters of yours seem to think that you also believe in this theory. So my question to you is: Do you really believe in all this, or are people just putting words in your mouth?
6. Hi, I am Emily and I am from Los Angeles. The Republican Party once stood for limited government, which meant reduce federal spending because it cost less and we spent less. However, over the past decade, real discretionary federal spending has in fact increased 40 percent, more than half of which has been non-defense related. So my question is: What are the names of the top three federal programs you would reduce in size in order to decrease...
7. My name is Ronald Lanham from Mobile, Alabama. And I want you to tell me, do you support the elimination of the federal income tax in favor of a national retail sales tax, also known as the fair tax? Thank you.
8. President Bush made a commitment when he ran for president in 2000 and 2004 that he would oppose and veto any tax increase that Congress sent him. My question to each of the candidates is: Would you promise to the people watching this right now, that you will oppose and veto any efforts to raise taxes as long as you're president?
9. Hi, I'm Ted Faturos from Manhattan Beach, California. mmmm, nothing says delicious like cheap corn subsidized by the American taxpayer. For a lot of Americans, however, a bitter taste is left in their mouth when they learned about how the U.S. taxpayer bankrolls billions of dollars in farm subsidies that mostly go to large item business interests. I'm curious which candidate could label themselves fiscally responsible, will endorse the elimination of farm subsidies if they are elected president in 2008.
10. My name is LeeAnn Anderson and I am from Pittsburgh, Pennsylvania, and these are my kids Evan and May. Maya is from China and we adopted him to give her a better life. We never dreamed that she would that she'd be exposed to lead after leaving China, and now we find trains like this that are covered with lead in our home. My question for the candidates are, what are you going to do to make sure that these kind of toys don't make their way into our homes and that we have safe toys that are made in America again and we keep jobs in America?
11. I'm Jay Fox, lifetime member of the NRA. Now, I am from a small town and as in any small town, we like our big guns. My question to you is: What is your opinion of gun control? And don't worry (cocks rifle), you can answer however you like.
12. Hello. My name is Andrew Fink, and I have a question for Rudy Giuliani. Mr. Giuliani, at a recent NRA convention, you stated that it's every American's right to be secure. Yet, on March 21 of the year 2000, The Boston Globe quoted you as saying, "Anyone wanting to own a gun should have to pass a written exam." Considering the Constitution grants us the right to bear arms as a means of protection, why do you believe that citizens should be required to pass an exam in order to exercise their right to protect themselves and their families? Thank you.
13. Hi there. I'm Eric Berntson from Phoenix, Arizona. Got a quick question for all you candidates. Any of you all want to tell us about your gun collection, roughly how many you own, what your favorite make, model and caliber is, if any of them require a tax stamp?
14. Hi, this is me and my son Prentiss. We're from Atlanta. I want to ask you guys a question. I notice you spend billions of dollars on the war in Iraq every year. But what about the war going on in our country, black on black crime? Two hundred to 400 black men die yearly in one city alone. What are you going to do about that war? It feels like the Taliban is right outside.
15. Hi. My name is Journey. I'm from Texas. And this question is for all politically pro-life candidates. In the event that abortion becomes illegal and a woman obtains an abortion anyway, what should she be charged with, and what should her punishment be? What about the doctor who performs the abortion?
16. Hi. This is Tyler Overman from Memphis, Tennessee. And I have a quick question for those of you who would call yourselves Christian conservatives. The death penalty, what would Jesus do?
17. I am Joseph. I am from Dallas, Texas, and how you answer this question will tell us everything we need to know about you. Do you believe every word of this book? [Shows a copy of the King James Bible to the camera.] Specifically, this book that I am holding in my hand, do you believe this book?
18. Good evening, gentlemen. My name is Yasmin and I hail from Huntsville, Alabama. My question has to do with the current crisis in Iraq, as well as the U.S. efforts in Afghanistan. After living abroad, personally, in the Middle East for a year, I realized just how much damage the Iraq war and the perception of invasion has done to the image of America. What would you do as president to repair the image of America in the eyes of the Muslim world?
19. Hello, gentlemen. I'm Andrew, and I'm a college student from Seattle, Washington. Recently, Senator McCain has come out strongly against using waterboarding as an instrument of interrogation. My question for the rest of you is, considering that Mr. McCain is the only one with any firsthand knowledge on the subject, how can those of you sharing the stage with him disagree with his position?
20. Hello. My name is Buzz Brockway from Lawrenceville, Georgia. All the talk about the war in Iraq centers around how quickly we can get out. I think that's the wrong question. We need to make a permanent or long-term military commitment to the region. By staying in Iraq, we provide long-term stability to the region, we provide support for our allies, and we act as a deterrent to the trouble-makers in the region. Which presidential candidate will make a permanent of long-term military commitment to the people of Iraq? Thank you.
21. Hi. My name is Sam Garcia. I'm from Colorado Springs, Colorado. The following question is for Rudy Giuliani. Mr. Giuliani, a while back, a friend and I were having a discussion about you and some of the other Republican candidates. He blatantly made this statement somewhere along the line: Rudy Giuliani is using September 11, 2001, to propel himself into the White House. My question to you is: How do you respond to this accusation and other accusations similar to it?
22. Yes. Will you grant your vice president as much power and influence as I've had? And remember, before you answer, I'm watching you.
23. My name's Keith Kerr, from Santa Rosa, California. I'm a retired brigadier general with 43 years of service. And I'm a graduate of the Special Forces Officer Course, the Commanding General Staff Course and the Army War College. And I'm an openly gay man. I want to know why you think that American men and women in uniform are not professional enough to serve with gays and lesbians.
24. Hi, my name is David Cercone. I'd like to ask all the candidates if they accept the support of the Log Cabin Republicans, and why should the Log Cabin Republicans support their candidacy?
25. This is Adam Florzak of Illinois. The national debt is now growing so quickly it will have increased by over half- million dollars in just the time it takes to ask this question. Over the years, politicians have borrowed just under $2 trillion from the Social Security trust fund to cover these massive budget deficits, and now the retirements of our generation are at risk. What will you do as president to help repay this money and restore the trust?
26. My name is Steve Nielson. And this question comes to you from Denver, Colorado. JFK's vision put a man on the moon from a nonexistent space program in about seven years. The new vision for space exploration has provided about 15 years for that same feat. Meanwhile, Congress is pulling funding for human-to-Mars research altogether. Is there a candidate amongst you willing to take a pledge on behalf of the Mars Society of sending an American to the surface of Mars by 2020? If not, what is your vision for human space exploration?
27. Hi, my name is David McMillan, and I'm from Los Angeles, California. On a variety of specific issues -- gay marriage, taxes, the death penalty, immigration, faith-based initiatives, school vouchers, school prayer—many African Americans hold fairly conservative views. And yet, we overwhelmingly vote Democrat in most elections. So my question to any of the Republican candidates here is, why don't we vote for you?
28. Hello, my name is Leroy Brooks. I am from Houston, Texas and my question is for all the candidates. Whether this flag right here [points to a Confederate flag] represents the symbol of racism, a symbol of political ideology, a symbol of Southern heritage—or, is it something completely different?
29. Good evening. My name is Dr. Hank Campbell. I'm in Lake Worth, Florida. My question is our infrastructure. It's been estimated that to fix the bridges, the tunnels, the power grids, the water delivery systems in this country will be in excess of $2 trillion—that is "t" for "trillion"—and it is plural. Who among the candidates here is willing to step forward and begin to articulate the very difficult sacrifices which we need to make in order to start repairing America? Thank you.
30. Mark Strauss, Davenport, Iowa. This question is for Ron Paul. Mr. Paul, I think we both know that the Republican party is never going to give you the nomination. But I'm hoping that you're crazy like a fox like that and you're using this exposure to propel yourself into an independent run. My question is for Ron Paul: Mr. Paul, are you going to let America down by not running as an independent? Thank you.
31. Giuliani, can you explain why you being a lifelong Yankees fan, that this year, after the Yankees lost everything, you rooted for the Red Sox in the postseason? Can you explain that position for me?

=== Controversy about CNN's choice of questions ===
Soon after the debate several bloggers discovered that several questions to Republicans were asked by Democratic supporters, not by undecided voters, with some bloggers and commentators alleging that CNN purposely arranged this to embarrass Republican candidates. Also, there is controversy that many of the questions were used to boost certain candidates, but not others. The question absorbed in controversy is the one asked by retired general Keith Kerr (question 23, see above). He is an adviser to the Hillary Clinton campaign, and is also a supporter of her campaign. This has given rise to claims that he was planted by the Clinton campaign.
