= Denise Caruso =

American journalist and analyst

- Born: 1956 (age 69–70)
- Education: California Polytechnic State University
- Occupations: Journalist, Founder of The Hybrid Vigor Institute, Senior Research Scholar in Engineering and Public Policy, Carnegie Mellon University

Denise Caruso (born in 1956) is an American journalist and analyst specializing in the industries of digital technology and biotechnology. She was dubbed “the Walter Winchell of Silicon Valley” by WIRED magazine. She is the founder and executive director of The Hybrid Vigor Institute, a non-profit think tank created in 2000 that emphasizes cross-sector collaboration.

She currently lives and works in Pittsburgh, Pennsylvania, where she is a senior research scholar in the Department of Engineering and Public Policy at Carnegie Mellon University.

== Education ==
Caruso earned a Bachelor of Arts in English from California Polytechnic State University in San Luis Obispo, California.

== Writing career ==
Caruso is the author of Intervention: Confronting the Real Risks of Genetic Engineering and Life on a Biotech Planet. The book was awarded a silver medal at the 2007 Independent Publishers Book Awards for science writing, and was on Strategy+Business magazine's “Best Business Books of 2007” list.

Caruso began her career as a technology journalist reporting for two trade publications; in 1984, she was a columnist for InfoWorld, and in 1985, she was the West Coast Editor at Electronics.

In the 1990s, Caruso was a founding editor of “Digital Media: A Seybold Report,” a digital monthly newsletter published by the Ziff Davis-owned Seybold Publications; a columnist for The San Francisco Examiner's Sunday Technology section; and a writer for the Digital Commerce column for the Monday Information Industries section of The New York Times. In 2007, she wrote the "Re:framing" column for the Sunday Business section of The New York Times.

Caruso's work has also been featured in The Wall Street Journal, Columbia Journalism Review, WIRED, I.D. magazine, the Utne Reader and the San Jose Mercury News.

== Academic and business consulting ==
Beginning in April 1997, she took a one-year position as visiting scholar at Interval Research Corporation in Palo Alto, California, a think tank and product incubator funded by Paul Allen. In spring 1997, Caruso was a visiting lecturer at Stanford University’s Human-Computer Interaction program, in the university's Computer Science department.

Caruso is a member of the Global Business Network, and an affiliated researcher at the Center for Risk Perception and Communication at Carnegie Mellon University.

== Speaking career ==
Caruso is a frequent keynote speaker, panelist, participant and moderator at a variety of symposia, seminars and industry events, including the first-ever Harvard Conference on Internet and Society in 1996 and at the Journalism and Technology conferences at the Nieman Foundation at Harvard University; the Newspaper Association of America's annual meeting; the Consumer Electronics Show; the American Center for Design; the American Institute for Graphic Artists; the American Magazine Conference, the Association for Computing Machinery; the Media & Democracy Congress; the Rand Corporation; and the Society of Professional Journalists.

In 1997, Caruso provided on-air commentary and interviews with industry personalities for an MSNBC cable television show about the Internet, called The Site. She has also provided commentary for National Public Radio's Morning Edition and All Things Considered.

Caruso was executive producer of Spotlight, an executive conference for the interactive media industry.

== Public health work ==
Since 2003, Caruso has been active in the biotechnology field, proposing more research and risk assessment for advancing technologies like transgenetic crops. With funding from the National Science Foundation, Caruso has completed case studies on the risks of xenotransplantation using genetically modified pig, and the risks of pandemic avian influenza.

Caruso's articles on pandemic influenza risks have been published in the Global Public Health journal and the Harvard Business Review.

== Advisory board roles ==
Since 1995, Caruso has been a member of the board of directors of the Independent Media Institute. She is a board member emeritus of the Electronic Frontier Foundation.

She also serves on the advisory boards of Public Knowledge, a Washington, D.C.–based public interest group that focuses on emerging digital culture; SustainAbility.com, a London-based business consultancy on corporate responsibility and sustainable development; and the Graduate Program in Design at California College of the Arts.
