= Monsters HD =

American TV channel

- Country: United States
- Broadcast area: National
- Headquarters: New York City

Ownership
- Owner: Rainbow Media

History
- Launched: October 1, 2003
- Closed: January 20, 2009 (by shut down Voom HD Networks)

Monsters HD was an American movie-oriented pay television channel which exclusively broadcast horror films and monster movies. It was launched on October 1, 2003 in the United States and premiered exclusively on the Voom DTH satellite platform, owned by Cablevision. The channel was shut down on January 20, 2009.

== History ==
The home theatre webzine Widescreen Review described Voom's Monsters HD as having "the largest collection of HD Horror films" when Echostar's Dish Network picked up Rainbow Media's Voom Suite of High Definition Channels. Rainbow Media's AMC Network and its annual Monsterfest (now known as "Fear Fest") programming of horror films served as the springboard and promotional platform for the launch of Monsters HD. Monsters HD commissioned the digital restoration of its film library, bringing them to high definition, and presented world television premieres of films such as the director's cut of the Stuart Gordon film version of H.P. Lovecraft's From Beyond.

In a 2004 Fangoria article, Monsters HD's senior vice president of acquisitions and programming David Sehring commented, "With Monsters HD, you're going to see more movies that have been recently transferred from 35mm inter-positives or negatives. We've been going back to all the studios, which is obviously a very labour intensive process because it's all brand new. [...] It's always a challenge to work with something that's still being developed." The network's creative director, Dylan Bylan, added "We want people to go to hi-def, because that's the way television's going. [...] A lot of people aren't realizing what they're missing until they see it."

After Cablevision's sale of the Voom Satellite Service in 2005 to Echostar Communications for Dish Network, Monsters HD ran on the satellite provider as part of a Rainbow Media distribution deal of Voom channels with Echostar Communications. In 2008, Dish removed Monsters HD and the balance of the VOOM channels, citing low viewership of the Voom suite of channels and breach of contract relating to contractual obligations with Rainbow's Voom programming expenditures, In response, Cablevision and AMC Networks filed a $2.4 billion lawsuit against Dish Network. Petitions were formed to save the Monsters HD channel as it continued to air on Cablevision systems, but were unsuccessful with Monsters HD and the rest of the Voom channels ceasing operations in the United States on January 20, 2009. In 2012, AMC Networks and Cablevision announced a proposed settlement of the lawsuit with Dish Network.

== Programming ==
=== Movie library ===
As of 2006, Monsters HD broadcast releases from the Paramount Pictures, Metro-Goldwyn-Mayer, New Line Cinema, Universal Pictures and Columbia Pictures libraries. Monsters HD also screened other films, including The Evil Dead, The Texas Chain Saw Massacre, and Octaman.

Monsters HD's curation of horror films for 2006 were presented in Rue Morgue's "TV Terror Guide", which cited the channel's monthly marathons, weekly film festivals including thematic programming stunts like May's "Monsters Mother's Day" featuring Larry Cohen's It's Alive trilogy; August's "Jawsfest" featuring the first four Jaws films; September's "Zombiethon" featuring George Romero's Night of the Living Dead, Dawn of the Dead, and Day of the Dead; November's "Monsters Goes Ape" featuring King Kong (1933), Son of Kong, Mighty Joe Young and King Kong (1976); and a Christmas schedule of "Killer Toy Stories" featuring films from the Child's Play and Puppet Master franchises." Monsters HD's program stunts for 2006 and 2007 also included a July "Japanese Giant Kaiju Fest" featuring various Godzilla films from Toho and an October schedule featuring four titles from the Hellraiser film series and a Halloween marathon of six titles from the Halloween franchise.

=== Original productions ===
Monsters HD also aired several original productions, including Monsterama, a series focusing on different genre celebrities, special effects artists, monster movie props and creature collectibles hosted byCassandra Peterson as Elvira. Tim Lucas, editor of the publication Video Watchdog, noted that "This show was clearly put together by people who know their stuff, and it is always a treat to watch."

The network also broadcast Gruesome Twosomes, a series of suggestive video "comic strip" vignettes featuring comic book cover artwork by Mike Hoffman.

On October 24, 2004, Monsters HD aired the documentary Tales From The Crypt: From Comic Books to Television, which premiered on October 17, 2004, at the Screamfest Horror Film Festival in Los Angeles, California. The documentary was described by the website Horrortalk.com as an "in depth look at EC, from its difficult beginnings to its tragic ending and the decency hearing that caused it."

== Promotional campaigns ==
Monsters HD's animated "on-air" launch package and logos were designed, created and produced by creative ad agency mOcean. In an article for HiDef.com, mOcean creative director Steve Kazanjian, noted that the inspiration for Monsters HD's animation package came from the key art of vintage genre posters hanging in their office. According to Kanzanjian, "Monsters HD focused on using the HD platform: emphasizing subtle colour variations, fine point lines and 5.1 stereo surround sound. Using a combination of 2D compositing, 3D character animation and hand drawn illustration, mOcean developed modern poster interpretations of classic monster themes such as 'Destruction Outer Space", 'The Island That Time Forgot', The Demented Psychopath's Lair' and a classic 'Southern Cemetery'. The imagery helped reinforce the network's tagline, 'It's Alive!' with all new animation, as each poster actually "comes alive" through visual moves."

In 2004, Monsters HD and web developer Sudden Industries, created an online "It's Alive! Monsters HD Sweepstakes" campaign to promote the horror and creature feature channel and the VOOM Satellite Service. Online digital trading cards, with sound and animation, depicting classic monster highlights were distributed to various genre websites and the horror community, to engage potential entrants for a chance to win a set of limited edition Arkoff monster figures, an HDTV set and a subscription to Voom.

Monsters HD also had an on-air campaign called "See The Good Parts", which highlighted select moments from horror films broadcast on the channel.

== Branding ==
Monsters HD commissioned genre artist and Swamp Thing co-creator Bernie Wrightson "to design their EC Comics-style image spots and brand." In July 2006, Monsters HD announced Wrightson's Uncle Samhain character at San Diego Comic-Con, with the character artwork appearing on branded T-shirts, advertisements and web banners heralding Monsters HD's user-generated video series called "American Monstar." On October 30 and 31, 2006, the Uncle Samhain character appeared in an animated "American Monstar" promotional spot which ran in over 150 movie theatres across the United States with a special Monsters HD presentation of the John Carpenter film Halloween.

== See also ==
- Monster movie
- Voom HD Networks
