= Voom HD Networks =

Suite of high-definition TV networks

Voom HD Holdings
- Trade name: Voom HD Networks
- Formerly: Rainbow HD Holdings
- Type: Private limited liability company
- Industry: Broadcasting, high-definition television
- Founded: June 27, 2003; 23 years ago
- Defunct: April 30, 2005; 21 years ago (satellite service); January 20, 2009; 17 years ago (networks)
- Fate: Closed
- Successor: Dish Network (satellite service)
- Headquarters: United States
- Products: Television channels
- Parent: Rainbow Media

Voom HD Networks was a suite of 25 original high-definition television channels owned by AMC Networks. At the time, the channels were the largest suite of high-definition channels in the world as part of a 15-year agreement between AMC Networks and Dish Network.

== History ==
The Voom HD Networks were originally part of the Voom DTH satellite platform launched by Cablevision and were operated by its subsidiary, Rainbow DBS Company. In 2003, Voom launched 21 original channels that were completely in HD. Service was broadcast via the Rainbow-1 communications satellite and launched on July 17, 2003.

In early 2005, Voom's parent company Cablevision announced it would seek "strategic alternatives" for Rainbow Media Enterprises. This business unit contained its Voom satellite service, leaving the future of Voom in question. Cablevision's board proceeded to shut the Voom satellite service down: The satellite service ceased on April 30, 2005, and Rainbow-1 and VOOM's spectrum allocations were sold to EchoStar.

In April 2005, Rainbow Media and Dish Network entered into a 15-year affiliation agreement whereby EchoStar's Dish Network obtained the right to distribute the Voom channels until 2020 and agreed that it would pay Rainbow Media monthly subscription fees for the life of the agreement. The subscription fees started at $3.25 per subscriber in the first year of the contract and were to increase to $6.43 per subscriber by the year 2020. In a separate agreement, EchoStar's Dish obtained a 20% ownership interest in Rainbow Media (the business unit that contained the Voom HD channels) and Rainbow agreed to invest $100 million into the Voom service each year for the first five years of the agreement. EchoStar's Dish Network announced that they would be adding ten of Voom's original 21 channels to their lineup starting May 1; the remaining channels were added on February 1, 2006.

EchoStar's HD subscriber base expanded from about 20,000 at the end of 2005 to about 1.3 million at the end of 2007.

The HD channels were also relaunched by Rainbow Media under the name "Voom HD Networks". Due to issues surrounding the formatting of the channels, fifteen of the 21 original channels were initially retained. Voom's HD collection was added to Cablevision's cable-TV HD lineup in late June 2007.

=== Legal dispute ===
In January 2008, EchoStar's Dish Network abandoned the affiliation agreement claiming that Voom had failed to invest $100 million in the service during 2006, though Cablevision and Rainbow provided Dish Network with the financial statements documenting their compliance. Dish Network proceeded to remove ten of the channels from their lineup on May 12, 2008, with the remaining five removed the next day.

Following the litigation discovery process, the Court granted Voom's motion for discovery sanctions. The New York State Supreme Court found that EchoStar's Dish Network "systematically destroyed evidence" in the case and stated that "it is entirely possible that the documents destroyed by EchoStar demonstrated that EchoStar knew all along that there was no breach ... and would prove Voom's case". The judge also stated that he would tell jurors that Dish Network destroyed evidence and that the jury may assume the evidence would have been helpful to Voom's case.

According to Sanford C. Bernstein analyst Craig Moffett in a recent Wall Street Journal article, "cases involving spoilation of evidence rarely go to trial because the odds are so skewed against the offending party". In this case, the judge would tell the jury that EchoStar failed to preserve certain evidence and bar Dish from calling its expert witness to testify on damages.

Additionally, the court stated in its November 3, 2010 ruling: "In conclusion, the court notes EchoStar's pattern of egregious conduct and questionable – and, at times, blatantly improper – litigation tactics. EchoStar's spoliation in this action, and the fact that it has been sanctioned for spoliation in previous actions, is precisely the type of offensive conduct that cannot be tolerated by the court. Similarly egregious is EchoStar's last-minute finagling with expert reports, believing that it can play fast and loose with the rules of procedure to enhance its litigation posture".

The trial commenced on September 19, 2012, in the New York State Supreme Court. During the summer of 2012, financial analysts who covered Dish Networks urged the company to settle the lawsuit in advance of the trial, as "the odds would ... appear to be heavily in Cablevision's/AMC's favor."

On October 21, 2012, Cablevision and AMC Networks announced they had settled their legal disputes with Dish Networks over Voom HD, an indirect subsidiary of AMC Networks. The dish was to pay a settlement of $700 million to Cablevision and AMC Networks, $80 million would go to the purchase of Cablevision's multichannel video and distribution licenses in 45 U.S. metropolitan areas.

== Channels ==
- Animania HD (cartoons & animated programming)
- Auction HD (televised auctions)
- Epics ("A cinematic celebration of the silver screen with magnificent stories and music, all about heroes, noble journeys and the triumphant human spirit."; only non-HD channel)
- Equator HD (exotic & unique locations & international cultures)
- Gallery HD (physical art & the artistic process)
- GamePlay HD (programming dedicated to playing video games, such as tips, tricks, cheats, hidden levels & items, Easter eggs, etc.)
- HDNews (high definition news; formerly Voom News Bytes HD)
- LAB HD (non-narrative video art & experimental film)
- Monsters HD (horror, sci-fi)
- Rave HD (music)
- Rush HD (extreme sports)
- Treasure HD (collections, collectors, & collecting)
- Ultra HD (hottest fashion, coolest styles, & insights into the luxury life)
- Voom HD Movies (classic & current Hollywood blockbusters)
- World Sport HD (international sports)

=== Movie channels ===
Known as HD Cinema 10, Voom also operated ten channels that broadcast movies in high definition.

- Divine HD (LGBT)
- Family Room HD (family-friendly)
- Film Fest HD (independent movies & documentaries)
- Gunslingers HD (westerns)
- Guy TV HD (male-oriented)
- Ha Ha HD (comedy)
- Kung Fu HD (kung-fu, martial arts, & Japanese anime)
- The Majestic HD (pre-1970s films in black & white & Technicolor)
- Vice HD (law enforcement)
- World Cinema HD (global classics, award-winners, and foreign films)

Sources: (Note: Voom HD Networks February 2007 Program Highlights) (Note: Dish Network expands high-definition package with Addition of Voom programming; lineup will include 10 original Voom HD channels) (Note: Voom HD Networks expands Library of Children's HD programming) (Note: Voom HD Networks’ March 2007 Program Highlights) (Note: Voom HD Networks' April 2007 Program Highlights) (Note: Voom high-definition satellite television announces comprehensive coverage of Democratic and Republican conventions on HDNews) (Note: National Businesses - Voom HD Networks) (Note: Rainbow DBS HD service launched) (Note: Rainbow Media launches stand alone HD content service)
