= Ngaire Blankenberg =

South African curator

Ngaire Blankenberg (born 1971 or 1972) is a Canadian-born South African museum designer, consultant, and administrator. She is a former director of the Smithsonian National Museum of African Art.

== Early life and education ==
Blankenberg's parents are South African and she was born in Winnipeg, Manitoba. Her mother is White and her father is Coloured (and albino); they had relocated to Canada as their interracial marriage was illegal in South Africa at that time. She earned a journalism degree from Carleton University and worked for 12 years in television and documentaries, including a year as a videographer on the CBC newsmagazine series Road Movies, before moving to South Africa to study media and cultural studies, earning a masters degree from the University of Natal. She moved back to Canada and began working as a museum designer and consultant.

== Museum career ==
Blankenberg has worked with the National Gallery of Canada in Ottawa, Superblue Miami, the museum at Constitution Hill, Johannesburg, and the Canadian Museum for Human Rights in Winnipeg. She is noted for her expertise in developing decolonization plans for cultural institutions as well as concept development and public engagement.

Blankenberg has worked as a consultant with Dutch design firm Kossmann.dejong and with Toronto-based Lord Cultural Resources, where she was principal consultant. In 2016, along with Lord co-founder Gail Lord, she co-edited Cities, Museums and Soft Power for the American Alliance of Museums. Lord and Blankenberg argued that the concept of soft power should be expanded from the political sphere to include "cultural and urban life."

From 2021 until 2023, she was the director of the National Museum of African Art in Washington, D.C. When she was appointed director on July 7, 2021, she announced her ambition to "redefine, heal and reconcile". During her tenure, Blankenberg was a leading advocate for repatriation of artifacts in the museum's collection, and in 2022 the museum returned 29 looted Benin Bronzes to Nigeria. Blankenberg resigned from her position on March 31, 2023, citing "individual and institutional resistance".

Following her resignation, Blankenberg returned to South Africa.

== Selected publications ==
- Blankenberg, Ngaire (2000). "That rare and random tribe: Albino identity in South Africa". Critical Arts. 14 (2): 6–48. doi:10.1080/02560040085310081. ISSN 0256-0046. S2CID 144647842.
- Lord, Gail Dexter; Blankenberg, Ngaire, eds. (8 July 2016). Cities, Museums and Soft Power. Rowman & Littlefield. ISBN 978-1-4422-7677-2.
- Hossaini, Ali; Blankenberg, Ngaire, eds. (27 March 2017). Manual of Digital Museum Planning. Rowman & Littlefield. ISBN 978-1-4422-7897-4.
