= William Pope.L =

American visual artist (1955–2023)

Pope.L
- Born: William Pope; June 28, 1955; Newark, New Jersey, United States
- Died: December 23, 2023 (aged 68); Chicago, Illinois, United States
- Education: Montclair State University (BA); Rutgers University (MA)
- Known for: Performance Art
- Partner: Mami Takahashi
- Children: 1 son

William Pope.L, also known as Pope.L (28 June 1955 - 23 December 2023) was an accomplished American visual artist recognized for his contributions to performance art and interventionist public art. He also created pieces in painting, photography, and theater. He was featured in the 2002 Whitney Biennial and was the recipient of the Creative Capital Visual Arts Award, as well as a Guggenheim Fellow. Notably, Pope.L was also highlighted in the 2017 Whitney Biennial for his work.

== Early life and education ==
Pope.L was born William Pope in Newark, New Jersey, on June 28, 1955, the second child of William Pope and Lucille Lancaster, and was raised in Keyport, New Jersey and East Village, Manhattan. He attended Pratt Institute from 1973 to 1975 and participated in the Whitney Museum of American Art Independent Study Program from 1977 to 1978. He received a Bachelor of Arts degree from Montclair State University, Montclair, New Jersey, in 1978. He received a Master of Fine Arts degree in visual arts from the Mason Gross School of the Arts at Rutgers University, New Brunswick, New Jersey in 1981.

== Early work ==
Tompkins Square Crawl (1991) at the Museum of Modern Art in 2022

From 1990 to 2010, Pope.L was a lecturer of Theater and Rhetoric at Bates College in Lewiston, Maine. As a faculty member he directed a production of Lorraine Hansberry's A Raisin In the Sun, in which he used both African-American and Caucasian actors as members of the same family.

While teaching at Bates, Pope.L's students reportedly coined his pseudonym. The appended "L" was taken from his mother's surname, Lancaster.

For ATM Piece, performed in 1997, he attached himself with an eight-foot length of Italian sausage to the door of a Chase Bank in midtown Manhattan wearing nothing but timberland boots and a skirt made out of U.S. dollar bills.

eRacism, a project that Pope.L began during the late 1970s, included over 40 endurance-based performances consisting of “crawls”, varying in length and duration. In one example titled Tompkins Square Crawl (1991) Pope.L dressed in a business suit and crawled through the gutter in Tompkins Square Park, New York, pushing a potted flower with one hand. Another example titled The Great White Way involved a crawl which stretched over 22 miles and took five years to complete. For this performance he donned a Superman outfit and strapped a skateboard to his back. The crawl stretched the entire 22 miles of Broadway, in New York City. Documentation of this performance was included in the 2002 Whitney Biennial.

In 2020, Pope.L would be featured in an episode of the Museum of Modern Art's Artist Stories on youtube. In this episode he would speak about his first and consecutive "crawls". The episode would feature brief clips and photos of his Tompkins Square Crawl, his Times Square Crawl, and his Great White Way Crawl. An additional article from the Museum of Modern Art quotes his crawls as "a way of making himself vulnerable in order to gain a deeper understanding of the world."

== 2001–2010 ==
In 2001, the National Endowment for the Arts (NEA) advisory renewal panel granted Pope.L $42,000 in financing for a traveling retrospective called "William Pope.L: eRacism". Shortly after announcing the award, the acting chairman, Robert Martin, rescinded funding for the grant.[1] Joel Wachs, then president of the Andy Warhol Foundation, stated in the December 21 issue of The New York Times:

"It is important, particularly in light of what I would consider an attack on freedom of expression, to stand firm. We want this exhibition to occur; we want other funders to step forward; we don't want the N.E.A.'s decision to be something that has the effect of stopping what I think is going to be an important exhibition of art."

The Warhol Foundation, in partnership with the Rockefeller Foundation and the LEF Foundation, provided $50,000 in funding for the traveling retrospective to tour the United States.[2] eRacism exhibited at the Institute of Contemporary Art at Maine College of Art; Diverse Works Artspace, Houston, 2003; Portland Institute for Contemporary Art (PICA), Oregon, 2003; and Artists Space, New York, 2003.

The catalog "William Pope.L: Friendliest Black Artist in America" was produced by curator Mark Bessire in conjunction with the retrospective exhibition.

In 2002 Pope.L received a Foundation for Contemporary Arts Grants to Artists award. In 2004 he received a Guggenheim Fellowship. In 2005 The Black Factory, an art installation on wheels, traveled from Maine to Missouri as part of The Interventionists show organized by the Massachusetts Museum of Contemporary Art (Mass MOCA). "Typically the Factory arrives at a city or town and sets up its interactive workshop on the street. People bring objects that represent blackness to them. The Factory’s workers use these objects in tightly rehearsed but loosely performed skits to stimulate a conversation — a flow of ideas, images and experiences. Most objects are photographed and made part of the Factory’s virtual library, some are housed in the Factory’s archive for later use, and some are pulverized in the Factory’s workshop to make new products available in the Factory’s gift shop."

In 2006 he was selected as one of the United States Artists fellows, for which he was awarded a $50,000 unrestricted grant.

Pope.L was featured alongside other performing artists: Sean Penn, Willem Dafoe, Brad Pitt, Steve Buscemi, and Juliette Binoche in Robert Wilson's LAB HD portraits. In 2008, Pope.L's piece "One Substance, Eight Supports, One Situation" was selected to participate in The Renaissance Society's group exhibition, "Black Is, Black Ain't".

The Mitchell-Inness and Nash Gallery in Chelsea showcased William Pope.L's solo exhibition, Landscape + Object + Animal, featuring works spanning from the 1990s to present. Through his diverse range of practices, including painting, collage, performance, video, and text excerpts, Pope.L offers a critical reflection on the societal norms that govern our lives. This review highlights the allegorical nature of his work, where everyday objects, stripped of their original meanings, are reimagined as politically charged symbols. By embodying multiple personas, from man to animal to Superman, Pope.L challenges the boundaries and labels that divide our world and reconstructs the landscape we occupy.

From 2008-2010, Pope.L worked closely with the Department of Art at Tennessee State University students and curator to realize his durational film, “ReEnactor.” The film was shot primarily in Nashville, Tennessee with some scenes in New Jersey and Pennsylvania.

In 2010, Pope.L was appointed faculty at the University of Chicago.

== Later work ==
During the year 2012, MoMA hosted an exhibit featuring various artists' works entitled "Thing/Thought: Fluxus Editions, 1962-1978." Pope.L was present for one day of the exhibit, during which he created a performative video piece. To infuse humor into his work, Pope.L collaborated with other visiting artists to select objects from two fluxkits on display and determine their placement.

In 2015 MOCA, Los Angeles presented Trinket, the largest solo museum presentation of Pope.L's work to date. The centerpiece of the show was Trinket, a monumental, custom-made U.S. flag (approximately 54 x 16 feet) hanging on a pole in the middle of the Geffen. During the museum's public hours the flag was continuously blown by four large-scale industrial fans — the type used on Hollywood film sets to create wind or rain effects — and which were illuminated from below by a bank of custom theatrical lights. Over time the flag appeared to fray at its ends due to the constant whipping of the forced air as a metaphor for the rigors and complexities of democratic engagement and participation. Trinket was originally produced in 2008 at Grand Arts, in Kansas City, Missouri, as the centerpiece of Pope.L's exhibition Animal Nationalism.

In 2015 Pope.L produced The Beautiful, a new choreographed crawl performance staged for the first time at Art Basel in Miami Beach. For The Beautiful, four men, dressed as Superman with skateboards strapped to their backs, roll onward in the dark. The rumbling of their wheels grows louder through speakers as they approach the crowd, and blends with the low churning of electric guitars. The ‘Super-Gents’ reach a wooden stage and crab-walk their way up, barely fitting onto the small surface. Holding each other, they finally break into a heart-rending, soulful version of the patriotic song America The Beautiful.

From 2017 to 2018, Pope.l created a work entitled "Rebus" that incorporated a diverse array of materials such as acrylic, ballpoint, chalk, felt, graphite, grommets, ink, markers, painter's tape, paper, Post-its, oil stick and towels on linen, measuring 235 × 305 cm. This was created in tandem with his "Whispering Campaign," which aimed to amplify the voices of the unseen and unheard through the use of audio.

In fall 2019, a trio of exhibitions of his work, collectively titled “Instigation, Aspiration, Perspiration,” took place in New York City at the Museum of Modern Art, The Whitney Museum, and the Public Art Fund. The first exhibition, "Conquest" was a communal performance piece with 140 participants who crawled on sidewalks for 1.5 mile relay style, over the course of five hours. The performance started in Greenwich Village and ending in Union Square in Manhattan. The exhibition at MoMA, "member: Pope.L, 1978-2001," in|cluded 13 early landmark performance works from the artist. At the Whitney, he created a new piece of work titled "Choir." This room sized installation featured an industrial water tank with sound landscaping from contact microphones on the pipes in the room.

Pope. L is included in the group show Black Melancholia. The exhibition curated by Nana Adusei-Poku includes 28 artists and focuses on the themes of grief and pain.

== Personal life and death ==
Pope.L died on December 23, 2023, in Chicago at the age of 68. He was survived by his son, Desmond Tarkowski-Pope.L, and his partner, Mami Takahashi.

== Quotes ==
Pope.L's art focused on issues of consumption, social class, and masculinity as they relate to race. He is quoted as saying of his own work: “I am a fisherman of social absurdity, if you will… My focus is to politicize disenfranchisement, to make it neut, to reinvent what’s beneath us, to remind us where we all come from.”

In his Foundation for Contemporary Art Fellowship bio, he wrote: "Like the African shaman who chews his pepper seeds and spits seven times into the air, I believe art re-ritualizes the everyday to reveal something fresh about our lives. This revelation is a vitality and it is a power to change the world.".

In an interview with Ross Simonini, Pope.L stated that he believes the ideal way to experience a performance is to be present during the performance, as opposed to viewing photos or videos afterward.

“One of the problems with time-based endurance performances like my crawl works is they have this marvelous creamy nougat center operating inside the performer, and this space is unfortunately not available in the images and mythologies that surround the work. So, typically, the surface of the work becomes the life of the work Most folks only get the neatness of the feat. How many miles? How much pain? How many people said or did not say this or that? I am not interested in that."

Pope.L explains why he used the phrase 'ignorance is virtue' in an exhibition:

“The phrase “ignorance is a virtue” came out of failure, my inability to arrive at an anchor or pivot from which to make many different proposals. Why many? Because I realized my audience would be varied. Even so, I began to sense failure early on but I did not want to believe it, that I would not be able find a pivot. I kept thinking: I’ll figure it out. Bottom line, for several reasons, I let myself become too ambitious without understanding the difficulties of the task. But I was stubborn or obsessed or embarrassed—however you want to call it, so I kept pushing and finagling hoping for clarity. Like many folks who make things, I learned as I went. initially I believed I could actually make a work that could speak to people, different people across a wide spectrum and geography. And speak to them in layers. I gradually realized this was a fantasy—maybe a very American one? And even if I could speak in such a way, what was I really saying? Finally, I realized that no matter what I said I’d never be able to say enough or the right thing at the right time. Sound works temporally. You only have the hearing-time someone is willing to give. And my awareness, as the instigator of the encounter, is always delimited by what I can know or offer at any one time. So—what is this about, this conjunction of time and knowledge? In what space do they meet? They meet in the space or architecture of ignorance. The construction of what we do not know. Or do not want to know. Or know but do not want to know. It’s a constructed space made of mechanisms of obscuring, removal, disavowal, and disassociation. I realized that my pivot was ignorance and went on from there.”

== Selected publications ==
- Pope.L: My Kingdom for a Title. Los Angeles: New Documents. 2021. ISBN 9781953441058
- member: Pope.L, 1978-2001. New York: The Museum of Modern Art. 2019. ISBN 9781633450868
- William Pope.L: The Friendliest Black Artist in America. Cambridge, MA: The MIT Press. 2002. ISBN 9780262025331
