= LAB HD =

- Broadcast area: Worldwide
- Network: Voom HD Networks
- Headquarters: New York City

Ownership
- Owner: Rainbow Media

History
- Launched: July 1, 2004; 22 years ago
- Closed: 2009
- Former names: Moov HD

LAB HD is a three-year experiment by Voom HD Networks. It is the only channel in history devoted to video art and experimental film as a continuous flow of ambient television. While it is no longer broadcasting, the channel persists as Voom HD Lab, an outreach effort on the part of its parent company, and it continues to commission pieces from artists and filmmakers.

Voom launched as a DBS (direct broadcast satellite) service in the United States in October 2003. The service offered 21 channels of high-definition video focused on niche audiences. Most of the channels were conventional offerings, but one slot was reserved for an experimental channel called MOOV HD. The channel was produced by Concrete Pictures, a design and production house in Philadelphia founded by Jeff Boortz. The intent was to produce video art for public consumption. The branding of the channel was elegant, but the content was of uneven quality, and it was derided as "the screensaver channel."

Voom assigned Ali Hossaini to serve as executive producer of the channel. He began revamping the programming with high-profile productions, notably a series of "video portraits" directed by Robert Wilson and produced by Noah Khoshbin. New strands of programming were introduced, such as Tank TV and Micro TV. The former featured public aquariums and the latter photomicroscopy in high-definition. Concrete Pictures produced a program called Space, which stitched together footage from NASA into ambient video.

Efforts to transform the channel culminated on January 1, 2004, when it was relaunched as LAB HD, with the tagline, Experiments in High Definition. Hossaini hired filmmaker Lili Chin to manage a new Outreach Program that would put high-definition gear, including cameras and a post-production facility, into the hands of selected artists. Chin succeeded in attracted a range of talent from the orbit of Anthology Film Archives. LAB HD has deep connections to Anthology Film Archives, where Lili Chin curates film programs and Ali Hossaini serves on the board of advisors.

During 2005 LAB HD productions thrived. Director Robert Wilson produced avant-garde video pieces with Brad Pitt, Winona Ryder, Jeanne Moreau, among others. Hossaini also collaborated with Sandra Antelo-Suarez of Trans Gallery on her project, Don’t Trust Anyone Over 30, a rock and roll puppet show conceived by Dan Graham. Originally staged with live puppets at Miamia Basel, a video version of the show was directed by Tony Oursler for the 2006 Whitney Biennial. The Museum of the Moving Image put LAB HD on permanent exhibit as well.

Unfortunately, LAB HD did not meet the criteria to survive as a commercial channel. It had been conceived as an ambient channel, and, in his notes, Hossaini refers to Jerry Mander's book Four Arguments for the Elimination of Television as a model for the channel. The channel was a continuous flow of non-narrative images and sounds, mostly music. It was meant to provoke reflection not distraction. This presented a weak value proposition from a marketing standpoint, and, on January 1, 2006, it was replaced by another innovative format, a video gaming channel that has garnered considerably more attention (outside the art world).

Voom HD Networks decided to keep the Outreach Program under the name Voom HD Lab, with Ali Hossaini as executive producer and Lili Chin as associate producer. Voom HD Lab has supported the work of numerous artists and filmmakers, many of whom had never worked in high-definition video. LAB productions appeared in numerous museums, film festivals and galleries.

== Exhibitions ==
- Ace Gallery Los Angeles
- Paula Cooper Gallery
- Philips de Pury Gallery
- 2006 Whitney Biennial
- P.S. 1/MoMA
- Couvent de Cordeliers (Paris, France)
- 2006 Tribeca Film Festival
- Anthology Film Archives
- Alona Kagan Gallery
- Monkey Town

== Filmography ==
2006

- Epiphany: The Cycle of Life at IMDb, HDTV, experimental feature, director: Ali Hossaini
- Video Portrait: Princess Caroline of Monaco, director: Robert Wilson, executive producer:
- Ali Hossaini, producer Noah Khoshbin, HDTV
- Video Portrait: Queen Farah Diba, director: Robert Wilson, executive producer: Ali Hossaini, producer Noah Khoshbin, HDTV
- Video Portrait: Prince Alexis Schleswig-Holstein, director: Robert Wilson, executive producer: Ali Hossaini, producer Noah Khoshbin, HDTV
- Video Portrait: Gao Xingjian, director: Robert Wilson, executive producer: Ali Hossaini, producer Noah Khoshbin, HDTV
- Rite of the Black Sun, director: Bradley Eros, executive producer: Ali Hossaini, producer: Lili Chin, HDTV
- The Aquarium, director: Pavel Wojtasik, executive producer: Ali Hossaini, producer: Lili Chin, HDTV
- The Landfill, director: Pavel Wojtasik, executive producer: Ali Hossaini, producer: Lili Chin, HDTV
- Sahara Mohave, director: Leslie Thornton, executive producer: Ali Hossaini, producer: Lili Chin, HDTV
- Portrait of Shanghai, director: Lili Chin, HDTV, experimental short
- Sorry, director: Gail Vachon, executive producer: Ali Hossaini, producer: Lili Chin, HDTV
- Meredith Salient Field, director: Theo Angell, executive producer: Ali Hossaini, producer: Lili Chin, HDTV
- Spectropia (episode), director: Toni Dove, HDTV, experimental short
- 25 Letters (3 episodes), director: Grahame Weinbren, executive producer: Ali Hossaini, producer: Lili Chin, HDTV
- The Tension Building, director: Erika Beckman, executive producer: Ali Hossaini, producer: Lili Chin, HDTV,
- The Mythmakers, directors: Sabine Gruffat & Ben Russell, executive producer: Ali Hossaini, producer: Lili Chin, HDTV, experimental short
- Poem, director: Mary Lucier, executive producer: Ali Hossaini, producer: Lili Chin, HDTV
- Light Mood Disorder, director: Jennifer Reeves, executive producer: Ali Hossaini, producer: Lili Chin, HDTV
- The Bridge, director: Fred Taylor, executive producer: Ali Hossaini, producer: Lili Chin, HDTV
- Urban Sonata, director: Jud Yalkut, executive producer: Ali Hossaini, producer: Lili Chin, HDTV, experimental short
- Stiff, director: Jenny Reeder, executive producer: Ali Hossaini, producer: Lili Chin, HDTV
- Carrara Landscape, director: Angie Eng, executive producer: Ali Hossaini, producer: Lili Chin, HDTV
- The Shadow Lords, director: Jose Figeroa, executive producer: Ali Hossaini, producer: Lili Chin, HDTV
- Light and Dark (VQ002), director: Benton C Bainbridge, executive producer: Ali Hossaini, producer: Lili Chin, HDTV
- Digital Buddha (VQ003), director: Benton C Bainbridge/Jin Hi Kim, executive producer: Ali Hossaini, producer: Lili Chin, HDTV

2005

- Video Portrait: Isabella Rossellini, director: Robert Wilson, executive producer: Ali Hossaini, producer Noah Khoshbin, HDTV
- Video Portrait: Sean Penn, director: Robert Wilson, executive producer: Ali Hossaini, producer Noah Khoshbin, HDTV
- Video Portrait: Willem Dafoe, director: Robert Wilson, executive producer: Ali Hossaini, producer Noah Khoshbin, HDTV
- Video Portrait: Robin Wright Penn, director: Robert Wilson, executive producer: Ali Hossaini, producer Noah Khoshbin, HDTV
- Video Portrait: J T Leroy, director: Robert Wilson, executive producer: Ali Hossaini, producer Noah Khoshbin, HDTV
- Video Portrait: William Pope.L, director: Robert Wilson, executive producer: Ali Hossaini, producer Noah Khoshbin, HDTV
- Video Portrait: Gabriella Orenstein, director: Robert Wilson, executive producer: Ali Hossaini, producer Noah Khoshbin, HDTV
- Video Portrait: Lucinda Childs, director: Robert Wilson, executive producer: Ali Hossaini, producer Noah Khoshbin, HDTV

2004

- Video Portrait: Brad Pitt at IMDb, director: Robert Wilson, executive producer: Ali Hossaini, producer Noah Khoshbin, HDTV
- Video Portrait: Robert Downey, Jr., director: Robert Wilson, executive producer: Ali Hossaini, producer Noah Khoshbin, HDTV
- Video Portrait: Jeanne Moreau, director: Robert Wilson, executive producer: Ali Hossaini, producer Noah Khoshbin, HDTV
- Video Portrait: Isabelle Huppert, director: Robert Wilson, executive producer: Ali Hossaini, producer Noah Khoshbin, HDTV
- Video Portrait: Juliette Binoche, director: Robert Wilson, executive producer: Ali Hossaini, producer Noah Khoshbin, HDTV
- Video Portrait: Marianne Faithfull, director: Robert Wilson, executive producer: Ali Hossaini, producer Noah Khoshbin, HDTV
- Video Portrait: Zhang Huan, director: Robert Wilson, executive producer: Ali Hossaini, producer Noah Khoshbin, HDTV
- Video Portrait: Steve Buscemi, director: Robert Wilson, executive producer: Ali Hossaini, producer Noah Khoshbin, HDTV
- Video Portrait: Mikhail Baryshnikov, director: Robert Wilson, executive producer: Ali Hossaini, producer Noah Khoshbin, HDTV
