= David Bohrman =

American television producer (1954 – 2023)

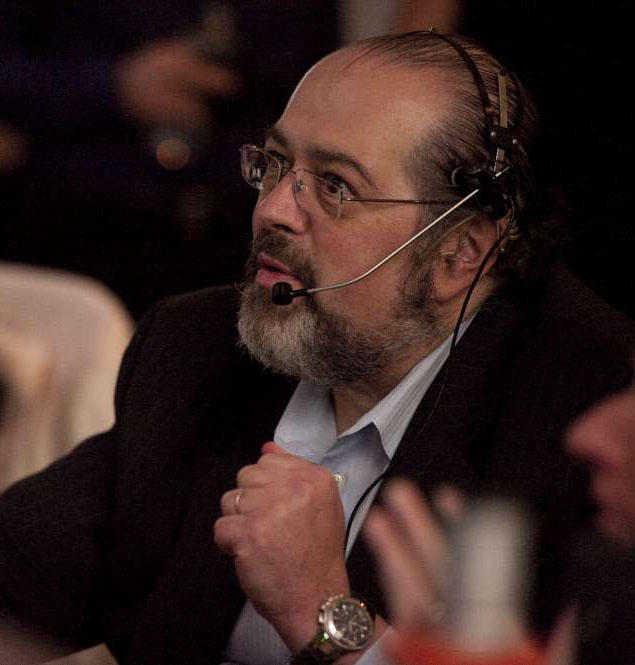
- Bohrman in 2011
- Born: April 30, 1954; Los Angeles, California, U.S.
- Died: June 25, 2023 (aged 69)
- Education: Stanford University (BA, BS); Columbia University Graduate School of Journalism (MS)
- Occupation: Media executive
- Notable credit(s): World News Now (ABC News); The Site (MSNBC); Imus in the Morning (TV version); The Moneyline NewsHour; PseudoCenter (Pseudo.com); TechLive (Tech TV); NewsNight with Aaron Brown (CNN); Situation Room with Wolf Blitzer (CNN); State of the Union (CNN); John King, USA (CNN)
- Spouse: Catherine Leuchs
- Children: 2

David Bohrman (April 30, 1954 – June 25, 2023) was an American news executive, working in network television news, cable news, new media, internet, convergence, and consulting. Bohrman created almost a dozen new TV news programs at ABC News, NBC News (MSNBC), CNN, and TechTV.

Bohrman served as senior vice president and the Washington, D.C., bureau chief for CNN. In this role, Bohrman oversaw newsgathering, political coverage and programming for the Washington bureau and all special events for CNN globally. In early 2011, he then became the chief innovation officer for CNN Worldwide.

Bohrman was the former president of Current TV, the network created by Al Gore and his partners. The network was sold to Al Jazeera in 2013.

Bohrman was president of The Bohrman Group, LLC, consulting to major media companies, new media companies, and digital ventures. His principal client for the 2016 election year was NBC News and MSNBC, where he helped lead a top-to-bottom redesign of those networks' election coverage. In 2019 he was brought to CBS News to oversee election live coverage, and was the executive producer of their coverage of the 2020 elections.

== Background ==
=== Personal life ===
Bohrman was born on April 30, 1954, in Hollywood, Los Angeles, the son of Delle Bohrman and Stan Bohrman. His mother is a television writer. His father, Stan Bohrman was an award-winning radio and television newsman, hosting Tempo on KHJ-TV in Los Angeles in the late 1960s and early 1970s with co-hosts Maria Cole and Regis Philbin. Stan had an extensive career in news and investigative reporting, including several years as a reporter and anchor at KPIX-TV in San Francisco, WTCN-TV in Minneapolis, and KYW-TV in Philadelphia. He died in 1994. Bohrman established an endowed fund for investigative reporting in his father's name at Stanford University. Bohrman had two sisters: Caren and Catherine.

Bohrman lived in Palo Alto, California, with his wife Catherine Bohrman, a sculptor focusing mainly on bronzes. They had two children, and two grandchildren.

Bohrman died from complications of hip surgery on June 25, 2023, at the age of 69.

=== Education ===
Bohrman simultaneously earned a Bachelor of Arts degree in French and a Bachelor of Science in physical science from Stanford University. He later earned his Master of Science in Journalism at Columbia University Graduate School of Journalism.

== Work ==
=== Innovation ===
During the 2008 presidential race Bohrman created the YouTube Debates, the Kodak Theatre Debate, and the Reagan Library Debate in front of Air Force One. The 2008 election cycle also is known for his implementation of what became known as the "magic wall" (Multi-Touch Collaboration Wall) where CNN’s key analysts (especially John King) were able to take critical data visualization about the election to a new standard of depth and clarity. Also in 2008, on election night (as the key producer in charge of the global CNN Election Night in America program) he introduced television's first real-time "hologram" as correspondent Jessica Yellin and The Black Eyed Peas' will.i.am were "beamed" into the studio from Grant Park in Chicago where the Barack Obama celebration was taking place.

Innovation has always been part of David Bohrman's work in politics and elections. The 2004 election cycle saw two key breakthroughs of his that fundamentally changed how elections, conventions, and even daily news can be produced. First was his idea to fully anchor CNN’s convention coverage from the convention floor, not the traditional anchor booth. This gave viewers a totally unique and more realistic sense of the proceedings than ever before and this continued through 2008. The second production leap that year came on election night. The program broke the traditional mold and originated at the NASDAQ Market Site in Times Square. The multiple screens brought the viewers additional content, from demographics to video feeds to 50 simultaneous vote boards to large individual boards. That venture led to the creation of The Situation Room on CNN, which relied on multiple video screens to tell stories.

The roots of innovation in politics for Bohrman go back to the 1988 and 2000 races for the White House. In 1988 he created the first electronic "site" of election information for ABC News and Peter Jennings (the 10,000 "cards" of hyper-media linked election information felt very much like the websites that would follow in a few years). The effort resulted in a new media startup at ABC called ABC News InterActive, which created multimedia award-winning products from ABC News.

For the 2000 political conventions in Philadelphia and Los Angeles, Bohrman was CEO of Pseudo.com, an internet television network. Pseudo not only had multiple video streams live during the convention, but also a skybox in the arena, and several 360 degree cameras, one of which was “gathered” by the Smithsonian and put into the permanent collection of items related to US Presidents.

=== Programs created ===
as executive producer or executive-in-charge:

- World News Now (ABC News)
- The Site (MSNBC)
- Imus in the Morning (TV version)
- The Moneyline NewsHour
- PseudoCenter (Pseudo.com)
- TechLive (Tech TV)
- NewsNight with Aaron Brown (CNN)
- Situation Room with Wolf Blitzer (CNN)
- State of the Union (CNN)
- John King, USA (CNN)

As president of CurrentTV

- The Young Turks with Cenk Ugygur
- Talking Liberally with Stephanie Miller
- The War Room with Jennifer Granholm
- Full Court Press with Bill Press
- The Gavin Newsom Show with Gavin Newsom
- Viewpoint with Eliot Spitzer

=== Patent ===
Granted US Patent # 5,109,482 (which concerns "Methods and systems for Media Consumption," a method for using a computer to retrieve and playback video segments from an interactive videodisc).

== Network highlights ==
As CNN's senior vice president and Washington bureau chief, he was in charge of all programming, production and newsgathering for CNN in Washington, D.C., as well as overseeing CNN's global Special Events division. He produced the 2008 Election Night in America program which had more viewers than any of the other broadcast and cable networks and the highest primetime ratings in CNN’s history. He has produced all the major news events and political programs on CNN for a decade (including the 2002, 2004, 2006, 2008, and 2010 elections and primaries).

Prior to his tenure in Washington, D.C., David Bohrman spent 25 years working in New York. After producing all the live coverage from New York on September 11, 2001, he served as the creator and executive in charge of Newsnight with Aaron Brown the signature CNN news program that followed Larry King Live.

In 2000, Bohrman worked as the CEO of Pseudo, the world’s first and largest Interactive Internet Television Network. He oversaw a staff of more than 250 and produced more than 50 live hours of internet television per week.

From 1998 to 2000, Bohrman was executive vice president at CNNfn, the financial network and executive-in-charge for The Moneyline Newshour with Lou Dobbs. At CNNfn he oversaw the production, operations, news coverage, budgets, and graphics for the network.

Bohrman worked at NBC News as executive producer for special events and breaking news from 1993 to 1997. He was responsible for all NBC News live coverage of all breaking news stories and major events.

Prior to joining NBC News – Bohrman spent more than 13 years (1980–1993) at ABC News. Where he served as executive producer of World News Now and ABC News InterActive TM, Senior Producer of Nightline, Special Events, World News Tonight and a part of the original staff of Nightline, first as a field producer, then as Senior Producer (Cited by People Magazine in 1982 as the "Youngest Senior Producer in Network News") up to that time. He was the first executive producer and creator of ABC News’ entry into overnight news programming, World News Now. In 1988, he created the first new media unit at any major media company: ABC News InterActive. Interactive laserdiscs were primarily education-oriented and sold to thousands of schools nationwide. From 1983 to 1988 Bohrman served as senior producer of Special Events, Breaking News, and Political Broadcast Unit at ABC News.

Bohrman started in television as a producer at KNXT-TV (Now KCBS) in Los Angeles.

=== Awards ===
- 2014 recipient of the Columbia University Graduate School of Journalism Alumni Award
- 6 Emmy Awards
- 18 Emmy Nominations
- 2 Peabody Awards
- Christopher Award
- Arthur Ashe Award
- AP Headliner Award
- DuPont Award (as Sr. Producer of Nightline)
- Polk Award (as Sr. Producer of Nightline)
- 2 Golden Mike Awards
- Los Angeles Press Club Award
- Valley Press Club
- Women at Work award
- 2 MacWorld “Superstacks” Awards
- MacUser “Eddy” Award
- People Magazine, 1982, “Lookout” profile as the youngest network senior producer
- Silicon Alley Reporter, named one of the “Silicon Alley 100” most influential new media executives

• Listed in 2011 Fast Company Most Innovative People in Business worldwide
