= List of awards and nominations received by Andra Day =

Andra Day awards and nominations
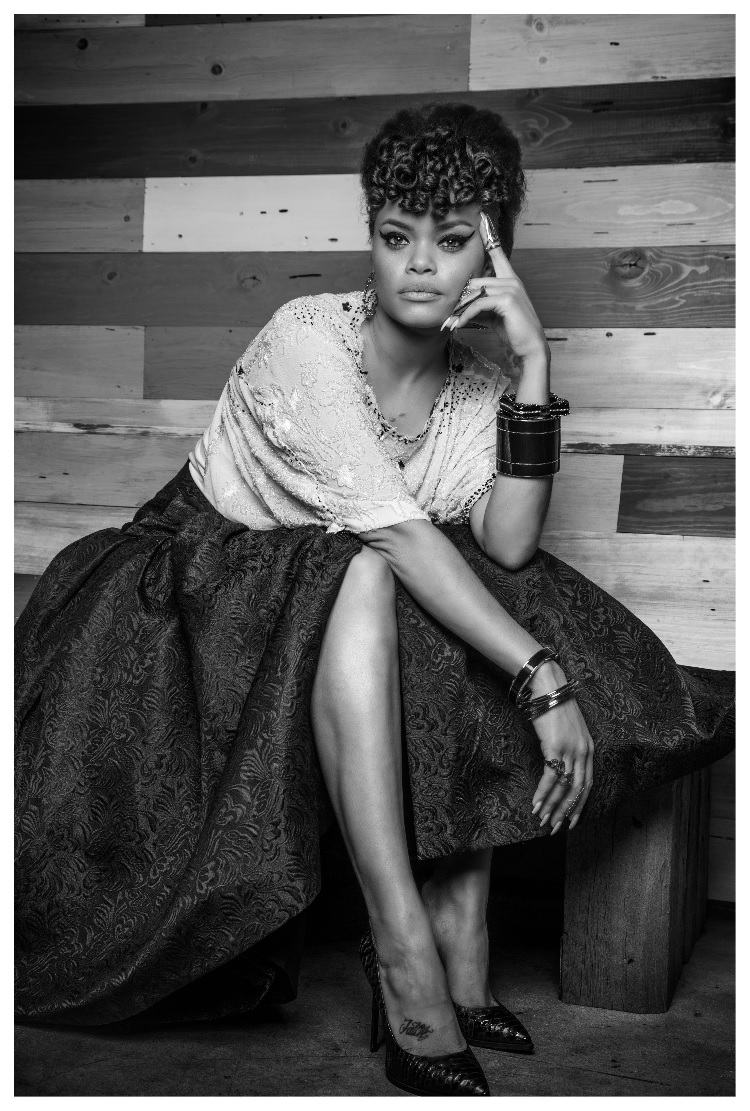
- Day in 2021
Awards and nominations
Award	Wins	Nominations
Academy Awards	0	1
Emmy Awards	1	2
Golden Globe Awards	1	2
Grammy Awards	1	3

Totals (Note: Certain award groups do not simply award one winner. They acknowledge several different recipients, have runners-up, and have third place. Since this is a specific recognition and is different from losing an award, runner-up mentions are considered wins in this award tally. For simplification and to avoid errors, each award in this list has been presumed to have had a prior nomination.)
- Wins: 12
- Nominations: 35

Andra Day is an American singer, songwriter, and actress.

Her debut studio album, Cheers to the Fall, was released in 2015 and it received a nomination for Best R&B Album at the 58th Annual Grammy Awards, while the single "Rise Up" was nominated for Best R&B Performance. For her live rendition of "Rise Up" on the talk show The View, Day was nominated for a Daytime Emmy Award.

In 2021, Day portrayed American jazz singer Billie Holiday in the biopic The United States vs. Billie Holiday, her feature film debut. Her performance won her the Golden Globe Award for Best Actress in a Motion Picture – Drama, making her the second African American actress to win in this category after Whoopi Goldberg in 1987. At the 93rd Academy Awards, she was nominated for Best Actress. The soundtrack of the film won Day her first Grammy Award, in the category of Best Compilation Soundtrack for Visual Media.

== Major associations ==
=== Academy Awards ===
Year	Category	Nominated work	Result	Ref.
2021	Best Actress	The United States vs. Billie Holiday	Nominated	

=== Children's and Family Emmy Awards ===
Year	Category	Nominated work	Result	Ref.
2022	Outstanding Short Form Program	We the People	Won	

=== Daytime Emmy Awards ===
Year	Category	Nominated work	Result	Ref.
2018	Outstanding Musical Performance in a Daytime Program	"Rise Up" (The View)	Nominated	

=== Golden Globe Awards ===
Year	Category	Nominated work	Result	Ref.
2021	Best Actress in a Motion Picture – Drama	The United States vs. Billie Holiday	Won	
2021	Best Original Song	"Tigress & Tweed"	Nominated	

=== Grammy Awards ===
Year	Category	Nominated work	Result	Ref.
2016	Best R&B Album	Cheers to the Fall	Nominated	
2016	Best R&B Performance	"Rise Up"	Nominated	
2022	Best Compilation Soundtrack for Visual Media	The United States vs. Billie Holiday	Won	

== Miscellaneous awards ==
=== BET Awards ===
Year	Category	Nominated work	Result	Ref.
2016	Best New Artist	Andra Day	Nominated	
2016	Best Female R&B Artist	Andra Day	Nominated	
2016	Centric Award	"Rise Up"	Nominated	
2021	Best Actress	The United States vs. Billie Holiday	Won	
2025	Best Actress	The Deliverance	Nominated	

=== Billboard Women in Music ===
Year	Category	Nominated work	Result	Ref.
2016	Powerhouse Performer	Andra Day	Won	

=== Black Reel Awards ===
Year	Category	Nominated work	Result	Ref.
2018	Outstanding Original Song	"Stand Up for Something"	Nominated	
2021	Outstanding Actress	The United States vs. Billie Holiday	Nominated	
2021	Outstanding Breakthrough Performance, Female	The United States vs. Billie Holiday	Won	
2021	Outstanding Original Song	"Tigress & Tweed"	Nominated	
2025	Outstanding Original Song	"Bricks"	Nominated	

=== CMT Music Awards ===
Year	Category	Nominated work	Result	Ref.
2018	CMT Performance of the Year	"Stand Up for Something"	Nominated	

=== Hollywood Film Awards ===
Year	Category	Nominated work	Result	Ref.
2017	Original Song — Feature Film	"Stand Up for Something"	Won	

=== NAACP Image Awards ===
Year	Category	Nominated work	Result	Ref.
2016	Outstanding New Artist	Andra Day	Nominated	
2018	Outstanding Female Artist	"Stand Up for Something"	Nominated	
2018	Outstanding Duo, Group, or Collaboration	"Stand Up for Something"	Nominated	
2022	Outstanding Actress in a Motion Picture	The United States vs. Billie Holiday	Nominated	
2022	Outstanding Soundtrack/Compilation Album	The United States vs. Billie Holiday	Nominated	

=== Soul Train Music Awards ===
Year	Category	Nominated work	Result	Ref.
2016	Best New Artist	Andra Day	Nominated	
2016	The Ashford & Simpson Songwriter's Award	"Rise Up"	Won	

=== Webby Awards ===
Year	Category	Nominated work	Result	Ref.
2021	Best Actress	The United States vs. Billie Holiday	Won	

== Critics awards ==
=== African-American Film Critics Association Awards ===
Year	Category	Nominated work	Result	Ref.
2021	Best Actress	The United States vs. Billie Holiday	Won	
2024	Best Original Song	"Bricks" (from Exhibiting Forgiveness)	Won	

=== Critics' Choice Movie Awards ===
Year	Category	Nominated work	Result	Ref.
2021	Best Actress	The United States vs. Billie Holiday	Nominated	
2021	Best Song	"Tigress & Tweed"	Nominated	

=== Celebration of Black Cinema ===
Year	Category	Nominated work	Result	Ref.
2021	Special Honoree Award	Herself	Won	

=== Guild of Music Supervisors Awards ===
Year	Category	Nominated work	Result	Ref.
2016	Best Song/Recording Created for a Film	"The Light That Never Fails"	Nominated	

=== Palm Springs International Film Festival ===
Year	Category	Nominated work	Result	Ref.
2021	Breakthrough Performance Award	The United States vs. Billie Holiday	Won	

=== Santa Barbara International Film Festival ===
Year	Category	Nominated work	Result	Ref.
2021	Virtuosos Award	Herself	Won	

=== Women Film Critics Circle Awards ===
Year	Category	Nominated work	Result	Ref.
2021	Best Actress	The United States vs. Billie Holiday	Nominated	
