= Andra Day discography =

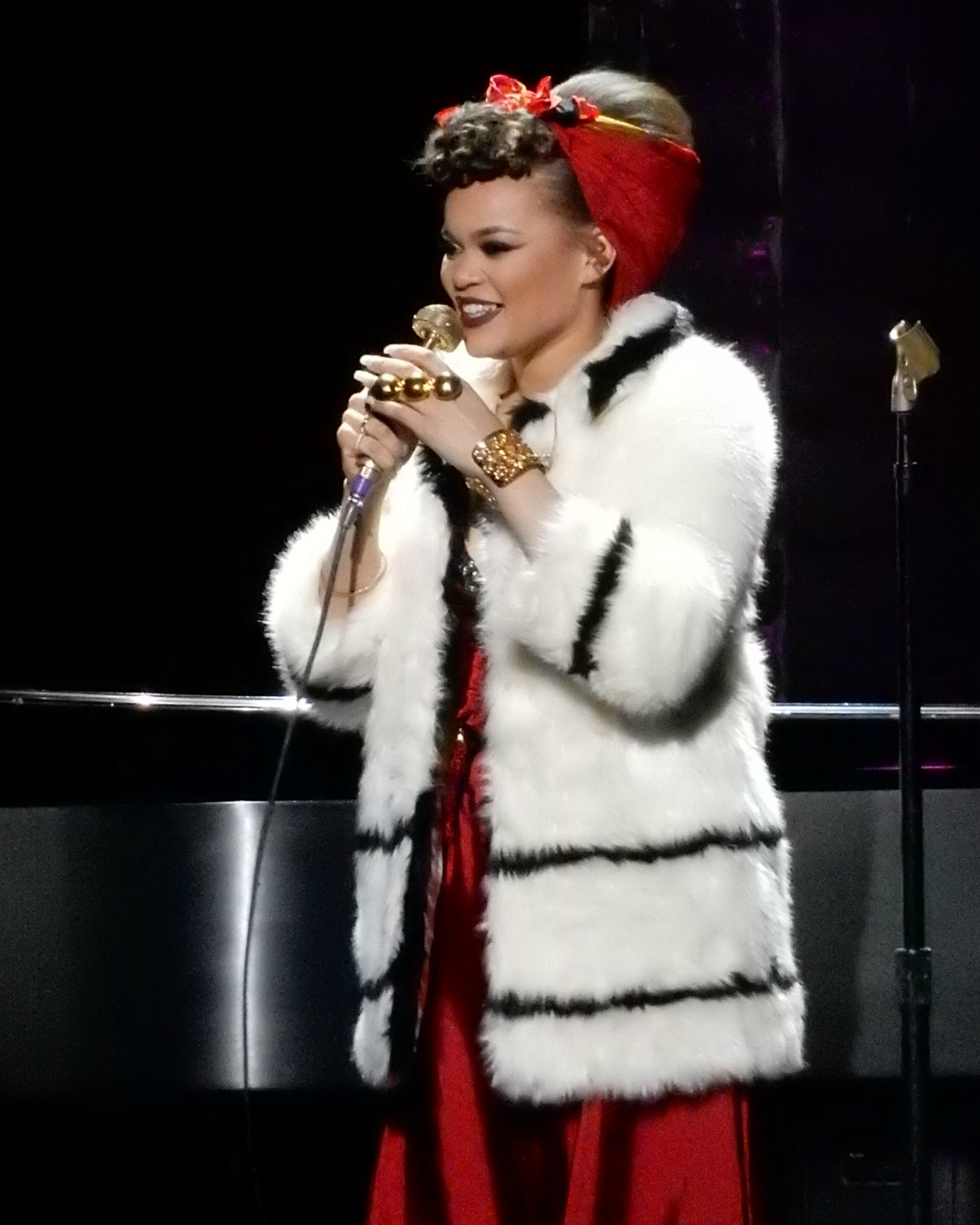
- Studio albums: 1
- EPs: 2
- Soundtrack albums: 1
- Singles: 16
- Video albums: 1

The discography of American singer Andra Day consists of two studio albums, one soundtrack, one video album, two extended plays, and 16 singles as a lead artist (as well as five as a featured artist)

== Albums ==
=== Studio albums ===
List of studio albums, with selected chart positions, sales figures and certifications
Title	Details	Peak chart positions		
Title	Details	US	US R&B/ HH	US R&B
Cheers to the Fall	Released: August 28, 2015; Label: Buskin, Warner; Formats: CD, LP, digital download	48	6	3
CASSANDRA (cherith)	Released: May 10, 2024; Label: Warner; Formats: Digital download, streaming	—	—	—

=== Soundtrack albums ===
List of extended plays, with selected chart positions
Title	Details	Peak chart positions	
Title	Details	US Sales	US Jazz
The United States vs. Billie Holiday (Music from the Motion Picture)	Released: February 19, 2021; Label: Warner; Formats: CD, LP, digital download	97	4

=== Video albums ===
Title	Details
Apple Music Festival: London 2015	Released: October 15, 2015; Label: Warner Bros.; Formats: Digital download

== Extended plays ==
List of extended plays, with selected chart positions
Title	Details	Peak chart positions	
Title	Details	US R&B HH	US R&B
Spotify Sessions	Released: January 22, 2016; Label: Warner; Format: Streaming	―	―
Merry Christmas from Andra Day	Released: October 28, 2016; Label: Warner; Format: Digital download	27	16

== Singles ==
=== As lead artist ===
Title	Year	Peak chart position										Certifications	Album
Title	Year	US Bub.	US R&B/HH	US R&B	US Adult Pop	CAN AC	CAN Dig.	FRA	SCO	UK	UK Down.	Certifications	Album
"Mississippi Goddam"	2015	—	—	—	—	—	—	—	—	—	—		Nina Revisited... A Tribute to Nina Simone
"The Light That Never Fails"	2015	—	—	—	—	—	—	—	—	—	—		Non-album single
"Forever Mine"	2015	—	—	—	—	—	—	—	—	—	—		Cheers to the Fall
"Rise Up"	2015	1	31	13	26	50	30	115	13	61	4	RIAA: 3× Platinum; BPI: Platinum	Cheers to the Fall
"Someday at Christmas" (featuring Stevie Wonder)	2015	—	— (Note: "Someday at Christmas" did not enter the US Hot R&B/Hip-Hop Songs chart, but peaked at number 12 on the R&B/Hip-Hop Digital Songs chart.)	24	—	—	—	—	—	—	—		Non-album single
"Gold"	2016	—	— (Note: "Gold" did not enter the US Hot R&B/Hip-Hop Songs chart, but did peak at number 13 on the Adult R&B Airplay chart.)	—	—	—	—	—	—	—	—		Cheers to the Fall
"The Only Way Out"	2016	—	—	—	—	—	—	—	—	—	—		Ben-Hur (Songs from and Inspired By the Epic Film)
"What the World Needs Now Is Love"	2017	—	—	—	—	—	—	—	—	—	—		Non-album single
"In the Room: Crusin'" (with Gallant)	2017	—	—	—	—	—	—	—	—	—	—		Non-album single
"Stand Up for Something" (featuring Common)	2017	—	— (Note: "Stand up for Something" did not enter the US Hot R&B/Hip-Hop Songs chart, but did peak at number 15 on the Adult R&B Airplay chart.)	— (Note: "Stand up for Something" did not enter the US Hot R&B Songs chart, but did peak at number 12 on the R&B Digital Song Sales chart.)	—	—	—	—	—	—	—		Marshall (Original Motion Picture Soundtrack)
"Amen"	2018	—	—	—	—	—	—	—	—	—	—		Non-album singles
"I Wish I Knew How It Would Feel to Be Free" (from Tyler Perry's Acrimony)	2018	—	—	—	—	—	—	—	—	—	—		Non-album singles
"Make Your Troubles Go Away"	2020	—	—	—	—	—	—	—	—	—	—		Non-album singles
"All of Me"	2021	—	—	—	—	—	—	—	—	—	—		The United States vs. Billie Holiday (Music from the Motion Picture)
"Strange Fruit"	2021	—	—	—	—	—	—	—	—	—	—		The United States vs. Billie Holiday (Music from the Motion Picture)
"Tigress & Tweed"	2021	—	—	—	—	—	—	—	—	—	—		The United States vs. Billie Holiday (Music from the Motion Picture)
"—" denotes a recording that did not chart or was not released.

=== As featured artist ===
Title	Year	Peak chart position		Album
Title	Year	US Dig.	CAN Dig.	Album
"#WHEREISTHELOVE" (The Black Eyed Peas featuring The World)	2016	39	21	Non-album single
"Hard Love" (Needtobreathe featuring Andra Day)	2017	—	—	Non-album single
"Going Through Changes" (The Dirty Diamond featuring Andra Day)	2019	—	—	From the Stars
"Pearl Cadillac" (Gary Clark, Jr. featuring Andra Day)	2019	—	—	Non-album singles
"I Just Wanna Live" (Keedron Bryant featuring Andra Day, Lucky Daye, and IDK)	2020	—	—	Non-album singles

== Other charted songs ==
Title	Year	Peak chart position	Album
Title	Year	US Adult	Album
"Winter Wonderland"	2016	27	Merry Christmas from Andra Day

== Other appearances ==
Title	Year	Other artist(s)	Album
"New York"	2015	Sal Filipelli	This Day in Music History
"The Only Way Out"	2016	—	Ben-Hur
"God Rest You Merry, Gentlemen"	2016	Jennifer Nettles	To Celebrate Christmas
"Burn"	2016	—	The Hamilton Mixtape
"Hard Love"	2016	Needtobreathe	Hard Cuts: Songs from the Hard Love Sessions
"Empire State of Mind"	2016	Lang Lang	New York Rhapsody
"Visiting Hour"	2017	Raekwon	The Wild
"Stand Up for Something"	2017	Common	Marshall
"Story of Everything"	2019	Sheryl Crow	Threads
"Going Through Changes (feat. Andra Day)"	2019	The Dirty Diamond	From the Stars
"Ain't Misbehavin"	2020	Count Basie Orchestra	Ella 100: Live at the Apollo!
