= Going Through Changes =

Going Through Changes may refer to:

- "Going Through Changes", a song by Army of Me from the album Citizen
- "Going Through Changes", a song by the Dirty Diamond, featuring Andra Day
- "Going Through Changes", a song by Eminem from the album Recovery

== See also ==
- Goin' Through Changes, a 1996 album by Zumpano
- "Goin' Thru Changes", a 2009 song by Ledisi
