= Soledad O'Brien =

American broadcast commentator and producer

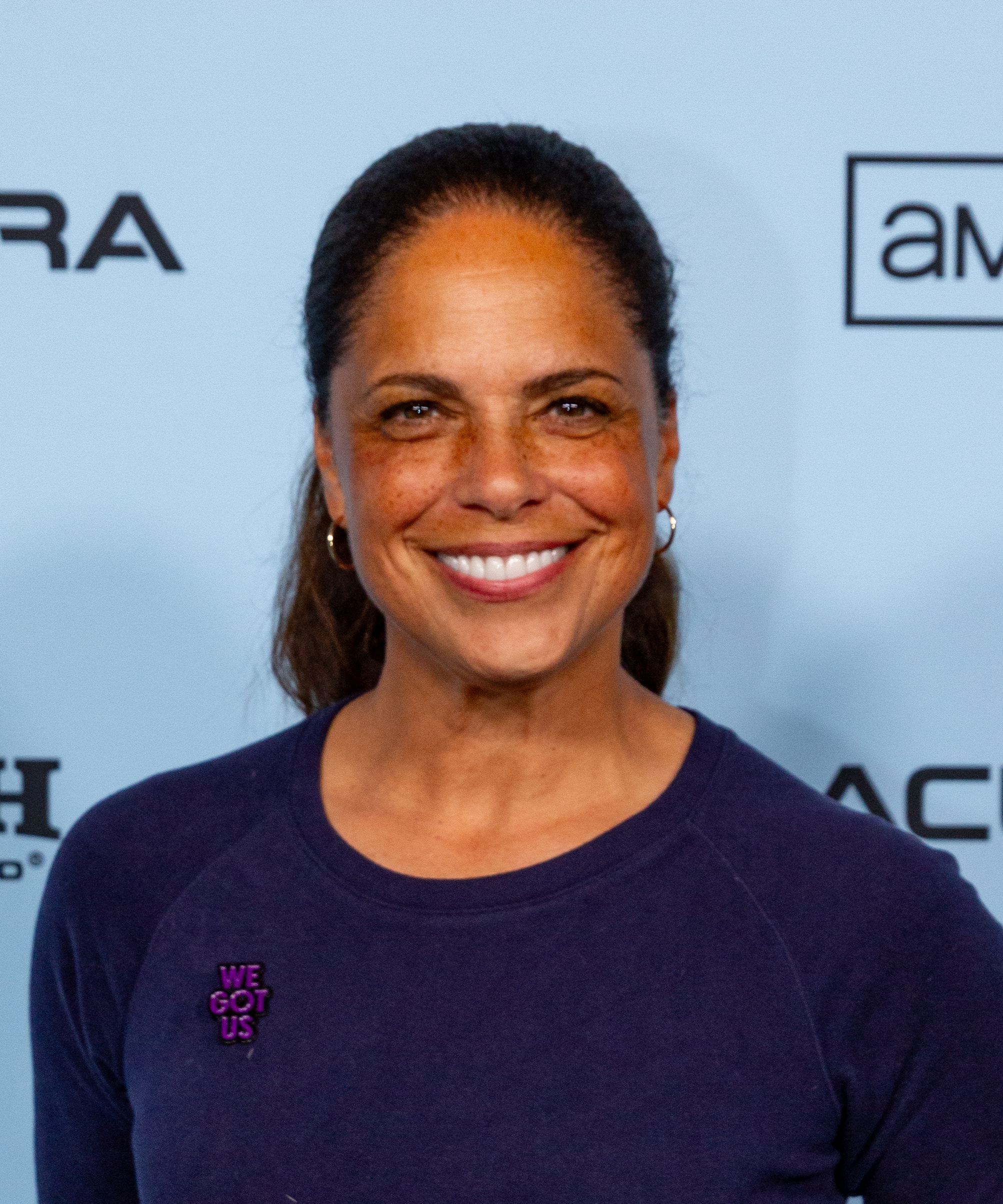
- O'Brien at the 2025 Sundance Film Festival in Park City Utah
- Born: María de la Soledad Teresa O'Brien; September 19, 1966 (age 60); St. James, New York, U.S.
- Education: Harvard University (AB)
- Occupation: Broadcast journalist
- Spouse: Brad Raymond (m. 1995)
- Children: 4

María de la Soledad Teresa O'Brien (born September 19, 1966) is an American broadcast journalist and executive producer. O'Brien was recently the host for Matter of Fact with Soledad O'Brien, a nationally syndicated weekly talk show that aired between 2015–2025, produced by Hearst Television. She is chairwoman of Starfish Media Group, a multiplatform media production company and distributor that she founded in 2013. She is also a member of the Peabody Awards board of directors, which is presented by the University of Georgia's Henry W. Grady College of Journalism and Mass Communication.

O'Brien co-anchored CNN's American Morning from 2003 to 2007, and was the anchor of CNN's morning news program Starting Point from 2012 to 2013. In 2013, O'Brien became special correspondent on the Al Jazeera America news program America Tonight, and was also a correspondent on HBO's Real Sports with Bryant Gumbel until the show's final episode in December 2023.

O'Brien has been celebrated for her reporting acumen, 'incisive' interviews, and the depth of her research. Her journalistic view has been described as being that "if you can tell a story well, you can move people to do something."

== Early life and education ==
"My parents were both immigrants—my mother from Cuba, my father from Australia. Both attended daily Mass at the church near campus. Every day my father would offer my mother a ride. Every day, she declined. Finally, she said yes. One year later, the day after Christmas, the two of them were married."

O'Brien was born and raised in St. James, New York, on the North Shore of Long Island to Edward Ephrem O'Brien (d. 2019), a mechanical engineering professor at Stony Brook University, and Estela O'Brien (née Marquetti y Mendieta) (d. 2019), a French and English teacher at Smithtown High School West. Her parents were both immigrants and met while they were students at Johns Hopkins University in Baltimore, Maryland. Her father is from Toowoomba, Queensland, in Australia and is of three quarters Irish and one quarter Scottish descent. O'Brien's mother, of Afro-Cuban descent, is from Havana, Cuba and was 14 years old when she came to the United States, sponsored by the Oblate Sisters of Providence of Maryland.

Interracial marriage was illegal in Maryland before 1967, so in 1958 O'Brien's parents married in Washington, D.C., where marriage laws were less restrictive. The newly wedded O'Briens then moved to Long Island, to the town of St. James. O'Brien is the fifth of six children, all graduates of Harvard College. Her siblings are law professor Maria O'Brien (born 1960), GE corporate lawyer Cecilia Vega (born 1961), businessman Tony O'Brien (born 1962), who heads a documents company, eye surgeon Estela Ogiste (born 1964), and anesthesiologist Orestes O'Brien (born 1967). Her niece is journalist Antonia Hylton.

O'Brien graduated from Smithtown High School East in 1984. She attended Radcliffe College from 1984 to 1988, starting as pre-med and English and American literature, but left to take a job at WBZ-TV. O'Brien went back to school while pregnant with her first child and earned her degree from Harvard in English and American Literature in 2000.

== Career ==
O'Brien started her career in journalism as a medical reporter on WXKS-FM in Boston because of her background as a pre-med student in college.

=== NBC and MSNBC (1991–2003) ===
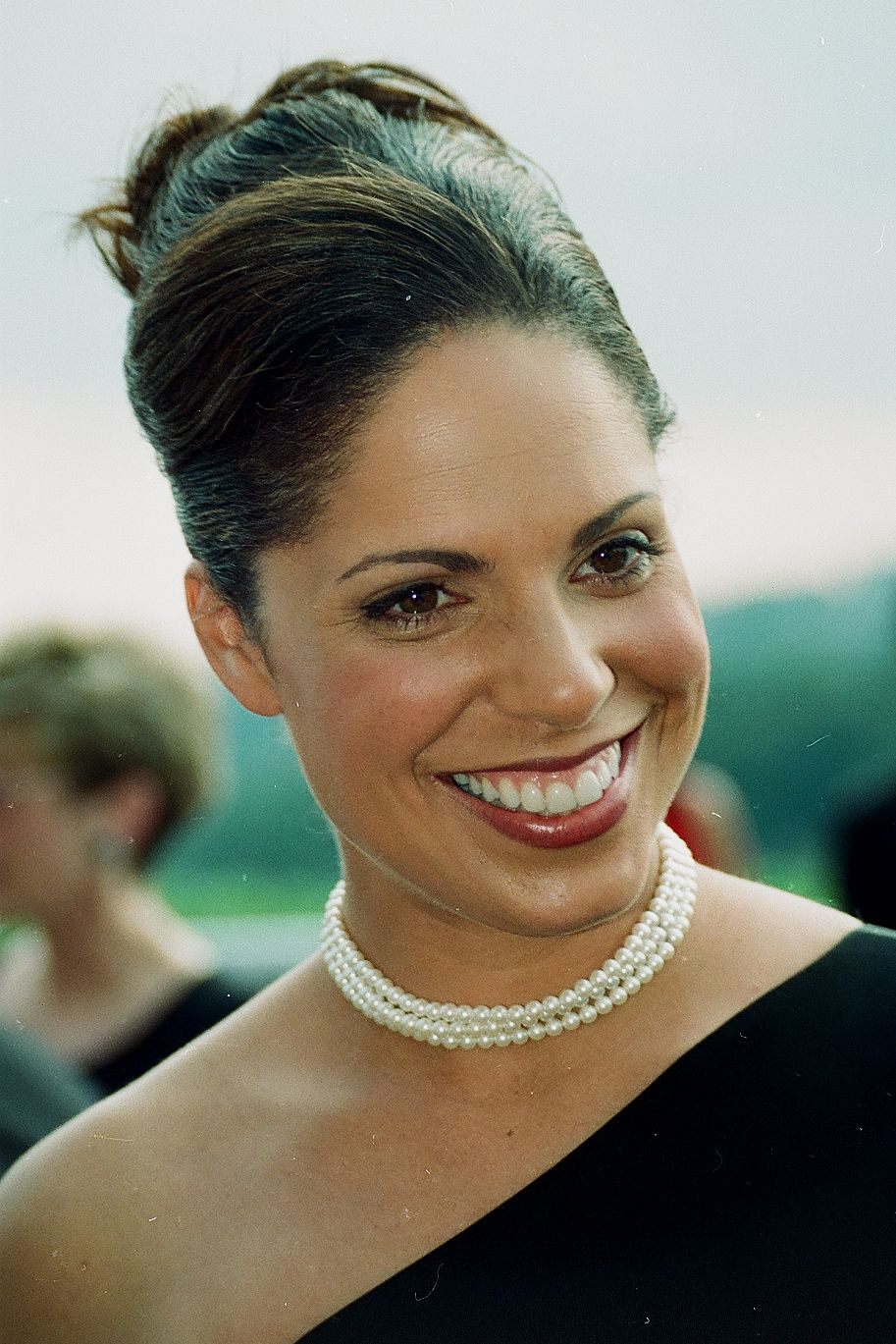
O'Brien in 2000

O'Brien began her career as an associate producer and news writer at WBZ-TV, then the NBC affiliate in Boston. She joined NBC News in 1991 and was based in New York as a field producer for the Nightly News and Weekend Today. She then worked for three years as a local reporter and bureau chief for San Francisco's then-NBC affiliate KRON-TV. At KRON she was a reporter on "The Know Zone."

Starting in 1996 and during the dot-com boom, O'Brien anchored MSNBC's weekend morning show and the cable network's technology program The Site, which aired weeknights from the spring of 1996 to November 1997. The show was unique in that she interacted with a virtual character named Dev Null, played by Leo Laporte in a motion-capture suit.

From July 1999 to June 2003, O'Brien was co-anchor of the NBC News program, Weekend Today with Jack Ford, John Seigenthaler later David Bloom and Lester Holt. During that time she contributed reports for the weekday Today Show and for weekend editions of NBC Nightly News. She also covered such notable stories as John F. Kennedy Jr.'s plane crash and the 1990s school shootings in Colorado and Oregon.

=== Warner Bros. Discovery (2003–present) ===
==== CNN: American Morning (2003–2007) ====
O'Brien moved to CNN, where from July 2003 to April 2007, she was co-anchor of the CNN program, American Morning CNN's flagship morning program that aired live from New York City.

In 2004, at the age of 38, she was named to Crain's New York Business "40 Under 40" list.

In 2005, she covered the aftermath of Hurricane Katrina in New Orleans, where she interviewed then head of the Federal Emergency Management Agency (FEMA) Michael Brown.

==== CNN: Starting Point (2012–2013) ====
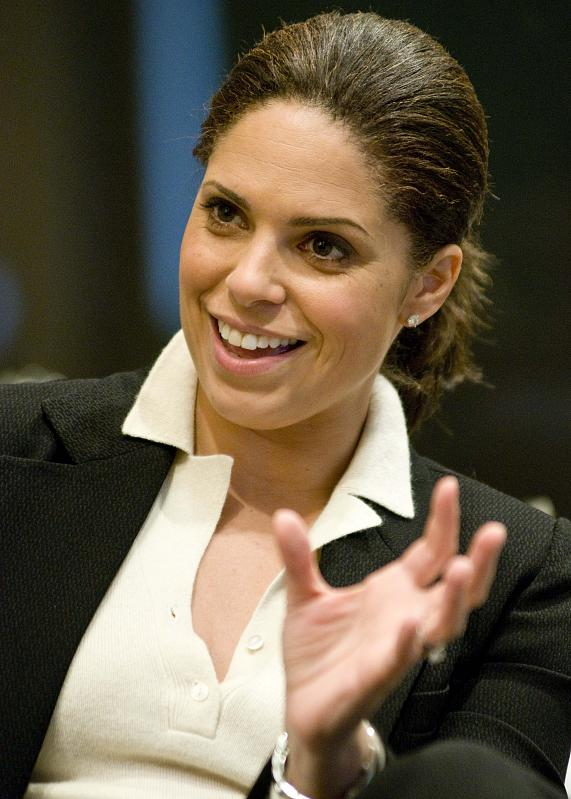
O'Brien in 2008

From January 2012 to March 2013, O'Brien was anchor of the CNN program, Starting Point. After CNN canceled American Morning and replaced it with two new programs, Early Start and Starting Point in 2011, O'Brien began anchoring Starting Point on January 2, 2012. It was announced on February 21, 2013, that O'Brien had reached an agreement with CNN to leave Starting Point for the new Starfish Media Group production company. CNN would provide funding in return for non-exclusive rights to its documentaries. March 29, 2013, was her last day on air at CNN as an anchor.

==== HBO: Real Sports with Bryant Gumbel (2013–present) ====
It was announced on June 12, 2013, that O'Brien was joining HBO's Real Sports with Bryant Gumbel sports news magazine as a correspondent.

==== Investigation Discovery: Quiet on Set (2024) ====
In 2023, O'Brien moderated a discussion with former Nickelodeon child stars that served as the concluding episode of Investigation Discovery's (another channel part of Warner Bros. Discovery) Quiet on Set: The Dark Side of Kids TV regarding abuse with MTV Networks officials.

==== Other work at Warner Bros. Discovery ====
In 2009, O'Brien completed a documentary titled Latino In America, documenting the lives of Latinos living in America. She continued working as a reporter for CNN, mainly hosting "In America" documentaries, and occasionally filled in for Anderson Cooper on Anderson Cooper 360. She also anchored exit poll coverage during CNN's coverage of the primaries and caucuses in the 2008 United States presidential race, and filled in for Paula Zahn on Paula Zahn Now before Zahn left CNN in 2007.

O'Brien anchored a CNN special, Black in America, in July 2007. The program documented the successes, struggles, and complex issues faced by black men, women and families 40 years after the death of Martin Luther King Jr. In the first installment, O'Brien investigated how James Earl Ray, an armed robber and escaped convict, had already spent a year on the run a month before his path collided with that of Dr. King in Memphis, Tennessee. In "The Black Woman & Family", O'Brien explored the varied experiences of black women and families and investigated the disturbing statistics of single parenthood, racial disparities between students, and the devastating toll of HIV/AIDS. The fifth installment of the Black in America series aired in December 2012. Her report on children and race featured the work of Margaret Spencer, based on the Doll Tests of the 1940s, polling children on their general color preferences: "white children have an overwhelming white bias, and black children also have a bias toward white, according to a new study.."

O'Brien's Starfish Media Group signed a deal granting HBO first-look rights for new programs or concepts it develops.

=== Podcasting ===
In January 2022, O'Brien and personal financial journalist, Jean Chatzky launched a podcast, Everyday Wealth, covering personal finance, the economy, wealth management, and other financial topics. It is sponsored by Edelman Financial Engines. In fall of 2023, approaching the 60th anniversary of the assassination of President John F. Kennedy, O'Brien collaborated with actor and film director Rob Reiner on a podcast series titled Who Killed JFK?.

==== Other work ====
On February 24, 2021, O'Brien testified at a House Committee on Ethics subcommittee hearing on "disinformation and extremism in the media". At the hearing, she accused Lou Dobbs and Tucker Carlson of disinformation, and also claimed MSNBC anchors Rachel Maddow and Lawrence O'Donnell were spreading "Russian conspiracy theories".

== Starfish Media Group ==
In June 2013, O'Brien formed the production and distribution company Starfish Media Group. Starfish Media Group signed a deal to produce a series of hour-long documentary specials for Al Jazeera America.

In September 2016, O'Brien became a host of the Hearst Television show, Matter of Fact with Soledad O'Brien; in addition to its broadcast availability, it is carried by FYI on Sunday mornings (a network Hearst partly owns).

In 2018, O'Brien hosted the documentary series Mysteries & Scandals on Oxygen.

== Other work ==
From 2013 to 2016, O'Brien was moderator of the National Geographic Bee, replacing Alex Trebek. In 2014, O'Brien co-taught a Harvard University Graduate School of Education class with Professor Joe Blatt on "Advancing the Public Understanding of Education." On May 1, 2016, O'Brien hosted PBS NewsHour Weekend, filling in for Alison Stewart.

On January 12, 2016, O'Brien appeared on PBS's TV genealogy program, Henry Louis Gates Jr.'s Finding Your Roots. The focus was on O'Brien's Irish ancestry. In 2016, O'Brien presented the 'I Am Latino in America' tour, with nationwide stops across the United States. The tour was streamed live globally on MOSH.

In May 2022, Soledad O'Brien partnered with JP Morgan to advise and give a lecture at the company's financial health education, wealth-building, and financial inclusion for Dallas' Black and Hispanic communities. O'Brien took the stage to discuss potential impacts and value of the event and its subsequent activity. As an Adviser to the summit, O'Brien stated she had made it her mission to ensure that the event isn't and won't be lip service without action and outlined plans for future events.

== Personal life ==
In 1995, O'Brien married Bradford "Brad" Raymond, co-head of investment banking at Stifel. They have four children: two daughters, Sofia (b. October 2000) and Cecilia (b. March 2002), and twin sons Charles and Jackson (b. August 2004).

On the NPR quiz show Wait Wait... Don't Tell Me!, O'Brien explained that in Spanish her full name means "The Blessed Virgin Mary of Solitude". When she started working in television, "a lot of people" recommended that she change her name. She is Catholic. O'Brien has said she does not speak Spanish fluently anymore.

O'Brien has been riding horses since she was 13 years old, a hobby which she now enjoys with her family. She and her husband run a foundation called PowHERful Foundation (formerly called the Starfish Foundation, and before that the Soledad O'Brien & Brad Raymond Foundation), which mentors women to send them to college. The foundation began in 2011.

== Honors ==
- 1995: Local Emmy, Co-Host Discovery Channel's The Know Zone
- 1997: Hispanic Achievement Award in Communications
- 2000: Newsweek, Critical Más: 20 for 2000
- 2000: People, 50 Most Beautiful
- 2004: Crain's New York Business "40 Under 40" honoree
- 2004: People en Español, 50 Most Beautiful
- 2005: Black Enterprise, Hot List
- 2005: Catalina magazine, Groundbreaking Latina of the Year
- 2005: Peabody Award, CNN coverage of Hurricane Katrina
- 2006: Newsweek, "15 People Who Make America Great"
- 2007: National Association for the Advancement of Colored People (NAACP), President's Award
- 2007: Gracie Allen Award
- 2008: Morehouse School of Medicine, Soledad O'Brien Freedom's Voice Award, first recipient
- 2008: Johns Hopkins Bloomberg School of Public Health, Goodermote Humanitarian Award for Hurricane Katrina and the 2004 Indian Ocean earthquake and tsunami
- 2009: Congressional Hispanic Caucus Institute, Medallion of Excellence for Leadership and Community Service Award
- 2010: National Association of Black Journalists, Journalist of the Year
- 2010: Edward R. Murrow Award, RTDNA/UNITY Award for Latino in America
- 2010: Peabody Award, CNN coverage of BP oil spill
- 2011: Emmy, Outstanding Live Coverage of a Current News Story Long Form for Crisis in Haiti on the 2010 Haiti earthquake
- 2016: Vanderbilt University, The Nichols-Chancellor's Medal
- Irish American Magazine, Top 100 Irish Americans" (twice)
- Alfred I. duPont–Columbia University Award, 2004 Indian Ocean earthquake and tsunami
- Emmy, 2012 election
- Emmy, "Kids on Race"
- 2022: Peabody Award, The Rebellious Life of Mrs. Rosa Parks
- 2023: Television Academy Honors, The Rebellious Life of Mrs. Rosa Parks

== Leadership and membership ==
- 2007: Bryant University, Doctor of Humane Letters
- 2011: Delta Sigma Theta, Honorary Member
- 2013: Harvard University Graduate School of Education, Distinguished Visiting Fellow
- 2013: Foundation for the National Archives (Washington, DC), Board of Directors
- 2014: Spelman College (Atlanta, GA), Doctor of Humane Letters
- 2016: Stony Brook University, Honorary Doctorate of Letters
- ExpandED Schools, formerly The After School Corp (TASC), Leadership Council
- National Association of Black Journalists, Member
- National Association of Hispanic Journalists, Member
- The Harlem School of the Arts, Board Member

== Filmography ==
- 1989: Second Opinion, WXKS-FM (Boston) – Host
- 1989: Health Week in Review, WXKS-FM (Boston) – Host
- 1989: Eyewitness News First Edition, WBZ-TV (Boston) – Associate producer, Writer
- 1991–1993: NBC Nightly News – Producer
- 1991–1993: Today – Producer
- 1993: KRON-TV (San Francisco) – Reporter
- 1993–1996: The Know Zone (TV Series) – Co-host
- 1996–1997: The Site, MSNBC (TV Series) – Host
- 1997: Imaging America, WNET (New York) – Host
- 1997–1999: Morning Blend, MSNBC (TV Series) – Host
- 1997–2003: Today, NBC (New York) – Host
- 1997–2003: Weekend Today, NBC (New York) – Host
- 2003–2007: American Morning, CNN (TV Series) – Co-Host (Producer, 1 episode: "Microsoft Security Suit")
- 2007–2011: Special Investigations Unit, CNN – Host
- 2007–2011: AC360, CNN – Host
- 2007–2011: In America, CNN – Host
- 2012–2013: Starting Point, CNN – Host
- 2013: America Tonight, Al Jazeera America – Host
- 2013–2015: Real Sports with Bryant Gumbel – Correspondent (10 episodes)
- 2013: Black in America: Black & Blue – Soledad O'Brien Reports (TV Movie documentary) – Executive producer, Producer, Director, Writer
- 2014: Da Sweet Blood of Jesus – Associate producer
- 2014: The War Comes Home: Soledad O'Brien Reports (TV Movie documentary) – Executive producer, Producer, Director, Writer
- 2015: Kids Behind Bars: A Soledad O'Brien Special Report (TV Movie documentary) – Producer, Director
- 2015: Shining a Light: A Concert for Progress on Race in America (TV Movie – Executive producer
- 2015: Billboard Women in Music 2015 (TV Movie) – Executive producer
- 2015: Babies Behind Bars (Documentary) – Executive producer, Co-director, Writer
- 2015–2025: Matter of Fact with Soledad O'Brien, Hearst Television – Host
- 2016: Batman v Superman: Dawn of Justice, Herself
- 2019: Unbreakable Kimmy Schmidt, Herself

== Works and publications ==
Books

- O'Brien, Soledad; Arce, Rose Marie (with) (2009). Latino in America. New York: Celebra. ISBN 978-1-101-14961-4. OCLC 760072829.
- O'Brien, Soledad; Arce, Rose Marie (with) (2011). The Next Big Story: My Journey Through the Land of Possibilities. New York: New American Library. ISBN 978-0-451-23284-7. OCLC 706018286.

Selected works

- 2008: Black in America (CNN)
- 2009: Latino in America (CNN and CNN en Español)
- 2009: Black in America 2 (CNN)
- 2010: The Atlanta Child Murders (CNN)
- 2011: Don't Fail Me: Education in America (CNN)
- 2011: The Women Who Would be Queen (CNN)
- 2012: Who Is Black in America? (CNN)
- 2017: Who Shot Biggie & Tupac? (Fox)
- Almighty Debt (Black in America) (CNN)
- Beyond Bravery: The Women of 9/11
- Children of the Storm
- Crisis in Haiti (Anderson Cooper 360, CNN)
- Don't Fail Me: Education in America (CNN)
- Eyewitness to Murder: The King Assassination (CNN)
- Gary and Tony Have a Baby (CNN)
- Her Children of the Storm
- Latino in America: Courting Their Vote
- Latino in America 2: In Her Corner
- One Crime at a Time
- Pictures Don't Lie
- Rescued
- The New Promised Land – Silicon Valley (Black in America) (CNN)
- Unwelcome: The Muslims Next Door (CNN)
- Words That Changed a Nation (CNN)

== See also ==
- List of Afro-Latinos
