= Emerson Coleman =

Emerson Coleman is a television producer and executive. In 2022 the National Association of Broadcasters launched the Emerson Coleman Fellowship (ECF), a training opportunity for college students and recent grads, established in his honor to nurture young people entering television production careers.

He served as the former senior vice president, programming, at Hearst Television. In that capacity he helped launch and support multiple long-running shows hosted by Tamron Hall, Jennifer Hudson, Kelly Clarkson, Ellen DeGeneres, Steve Harvey, Meredith Vieira, Oprah Winfrey and others.

He created the nationally syndicated Matter of Fact with Soledad O’Brien as well as The Matter of Fact Listening Tour series of web specials. He also developed The Remarkable Journey series of specials and shows which was ultimately sold to NBC.

Coleman is a past chair of NATPE, the National Association of Television Program Executives, and remains active on the Peabody Awards Advisory Board and the Dean's advisory board of the Annenberg School for Communication at the University of Pennsylvania.
