= The United States vs. Billie Holiday (soundtrack) =

2021 soundtrack album

The United States vs. Billie Holiday (Music from the Motion Picture)

Soundtrack album by Andra Day
- Released: February 19, 2021
- Recorded: September 2019
- Venues: Bay Eight Recording Studios, Miami, Florida
- Genres: Western classical; contemporary classical; soul pop
- Length: 39:26
- Label: Warner
- Producers: Andra Day; Salaam Remi; Raphael Saadiq; Warren Felder

Andra Day chronology
Cheers to the Fall (2015)	The United States vs. Billie Holiday (2021)

Singles from The United States vs. Billie Holiday (Music from the Motion Picture)
- 1. "All of Me" Released: January 13, 2021; 2. "Strange Fruit" Released: January 21, 2021; 3. "Tigress & Tweed" Released: January 27, 2021

The United States vs. Billie Holiday (Original Motion Picture Score)

Film score by Kris Bowers
- Released: February 26, 2021
- Recorded: December 2020
- Genre: Film score
- Length: 19:23
- Label: Lakeshore Records

Kris Bowers chronology
Bridgerton (2020)	The United States vs. Billie Holiday (2021)	Space Jam: A New Legacy (2021)

The United States vs. Billie Holiday (Music from the Motion Picture) is the soundtrack album to the 2021 film, released on February 19, 2021, by Warner Records. The film is based on the life of singer Billie Holiday, and also from the book Chasing the Scream: The First and Last Days of the War on Drugs by Johann Hari. Directed by Lee Daniels, it stars Andra Day as Holiday. The soundtrack features several compilations of songs composed and performed by Day. She also wrote the original song "Tigress & Tweed" and co-produced the album with Salaam Remi, and Raphael Saadiq and Warren Felder. Lynn Fainchtein and Daniels were the music supervisors.

The 13-song soundtrack album is composed mostly of western, contemporary classical, pop and soul music originated from the 1930s and late-1950s, reflecting on Billie Holiday's time period. It was recorded mostly live on sets and conceptualized in late-September 2019, even before the film's shooting began, the following month. The soundtrack won the Grammy Award for Best Compilation Soundtrack for Visual Media at the 64th Grammy Awards, with the track "Tigress & Tweed" being nominated for Best Original Songs at the Golden Globe, Critics' Choice Movie Award and Black Reel award ceremonies in 2021.

The film's original score, composed by Kris Bowers, was released as a separate 12-track album titled The United States vs. Billie Holiday (Original Motion Picture Score) on February 26, 2021, by Lakeshore Records, which coincided with the film's streaming release on Hulu.

== Background ==
The songs were recorded live on sets, and mostly used period instruments from 1930s and 1950s to capture the essence of contemporary classical music. Salaam Remi co-produced the original songs with Day, with the film's director Lee Daniels and Lynn Fainchtein jointly supervised the music. Remi and Fainchtein, in an interview to Variety, had spoken about the production of the compiled tracks. For Remi, "it was an understanding of what the original arrangements were, and how they would have done them at that time, but also how they were playing out in the movie". Both wanted the music to be as authentic to the time period, though the layers of the music and the orchestration, are more like the pop of the '70s than the jazz of the '40s or '50s. Remi stated that "On a lot of Billie Holiday recordings, you can't always hear [the detail]. There might have been one mic going straight to vinyl. I had to augment because I was recording digital at the highest possible bit rate." All the tracks were composed prior to the film's shooting, in Miami, in September 2019. Day, had sung for most of the tracks in the film, whom Remi had claimed that she "had the vocal chops and was nailing it from the beginning".

Mark Isham, Craig Harris and Christopher Gunning were previously announced to compose for the score, until Kris Bowers, was approached by the makers and recording for the background score were completed by late-December 2020.

== Release ==
Prior to the soundtrack release, Day's cover versions of "All of Me" and "Strange Fruit" were released as digital singles on January 13 and 21, 2021, respectively. The original song "Tigress & Tweed" was released as the third track from the album on January 27. Day co-wrote the song with Raphael Saadiq, who also composed and produced the track. The track list for Music from the Motion Picture was first released on February 1, with pre-orders beginning on the same date through the Amazon.com website. Warner Records released the soundtrack digitally on February 19, followed by a physical release on March 19, and a vinyl edition being released on July 23. Original Motion Picture Score, which contains Kris Bowers' compositions for the film score was released on February 26, coinciding with the streaming release on Hulu.

== Track listing ==
The United States vs. Billie Holiday (Music from the Motion Picture) track listing
No.	Title	Writer(s)	Producer(s)	Length
1.	"All of Me" (Andra Day)	Gerald Marks; Seymour Simons	Salaam Remi	3:35
2.	"Strange Fruit" (Day)	Lewis Allan	Remi	3:26
3.	"Tigress & Tweed" (Day)	Day; Raphael Saadiq	Day; Saadiq	3:11
4.	"The Devil & I Got up to Dance a Slow Dance" (Charlie Wilson and Sebastian Kole)	Wilson; Coleridge Tillman; Jamie Hartman; Warren Oak Felder	Felder for GO! Music/The Orphanage	3:21
5.	"Solitude" (Day)	Duke Ellington; Eddie DeLange; Irving Mills	Remi	3:01
6.	"Break Your Fall" (Day)	Tillman; Felder	Felder for GO! Music/The Orphanage	2:20
7.	"I Cried for You" (Day)	Abe Lyman; Arthur Freed; Gus Arnheim	Remi	2:40
8.	"Ain't Nobody's Business" (Day)	Everett Robbins; Porter Grainger	Remi	3:03
9.	"Them There Eyes" (Day)	Doris Tauber; Maceo Pinkard; William Tracey	Remi	2:49
10.	"Lady Sings the Blues" (Day)	Billie Holiday; Herbie Nichols	Remi	3:15
11.	"Lover Man" (Day)	James Sherman; Jimmy Davis; Roger Ramirez	Remi	3:00
12.	"Gimme a Pigfoot and Bottle of Beer" (Day)	Wesley Wilson	Remi	2:50
13.	"God Bless the Child" (Day)	Arthur Herzog Jr.; Holiday	Remi	2:27
Total length:				39:06

All music is composed by Kris Bowers.

The United States vs. Billie Holiday (Original Motion Picture Score) track listing
No.	Title	Length
1.	"Don't Cause a Fuss"	1:22
2.	"Great Night"	1:09
3.	"Billie's Waltz"	3:12
4.	"Tallulah"	0:57
5.	"Judge's Ruling"	1:38
6.	"Jimmy's Mistake/Lie to Her"	1:08
7.	"Carnegie Hall"	1:29
8.	"Lynching"	3:08
9.	"Walk in the Park/Levy Frames Billie"	1:12
10.	"All of Me"	2:08
11.	"Paint My Nails"	1:10
12.	"You Hate Her"	0:44
Total length:		19:23

== Charts ==
Chart performance for The United States vs. Billie Holiday (Music from the Motion Picture)
Chart (2021)	Peak position
UK Compilation Albums (OCC)	89
UK Soundtrack Albums (OCC)	43
US Billboard 200	137
US Soundtrack Albums (Billboard)	44

Chart performance for The United States vs. Billie Holiday (Original Motion Picture Score)
Chart (2021)	Peak position
UK Soundtrack Albums (OCC)	48

== Release history ==
Release dates and formats for The United States vs. Billie Holiday (Music from the Motion Picture)
Region	Date	Format(s)	Label	Catalog	Version(s)	Ref.
Various	February 19, 2021	Digital download; streaming	Warner Records	—N/a	Standard	
United States	March 19, 2021	CD	Warner Records	093624883395	Standard	
Canada	March 19, 2021	CD	Warner Records	093624883395	Standard	
Europe	March 19, 2021	CD	Warner Records	093624883395	Standard	
Japan	April 21, 2021	CD	Warner Records	WPCR 18422	Standard	
Brazil	May 6, 2021	CD	Warner Records; Lil Dank Records	093624883395	Standard	
United States	August 13, 2021	Vinyl	Ultra	093624883388	Limited edition	

== Personnel ==
Credits adapted from AllMusic.

=== Instruments ===
- Strings – Stephen Coleman (arrangements), Dan Higgins (arrangements)
- Bass – Salaam Remi, Raphael Saadiq
- Drums – Salaam Remi, TFOX
- Guitar – Vincent Henry, Charlie Hunter
- Horns – Vincent Henry (arrangements)
- Saxophone – Vincent Henry (arrangements), Khari Allen Lee
- Clarinet – Vincent Henry
- Orchestra – Czech Film Orchestras
- Piano – Alex Bugnon, James Poyser, Daniel Crean (programming), Eren Cannata (programming)
- Trumpet – Emilio Lopez
- Flugelhorn – Emilio Lopez
- Keyboards – Oak Felder (programming)

=== Production ===
- A&R – Rani Hancock, Joanna Terrasi (administration)
- Arranged By – Salaam Remi
- Music co-ordinator – Nik Boskoff
- Design – Stephen Walker (packaging)
- Executive producer – Aaron Bay-Schuck, Amanda Ghost, Lynn Fainchtein, PJ Bloom, Rani Hancock, Tom Corson
- Legal advisor – Jason R. Heller
- Management – Jeffrey Evans, Chris Atlas (marketing), Shawnaé Corbett-Rice (marketing), Nacho Burgoa (music clearance)
- Mastered by – Chris Gehringer (tracks: 1, 2, 4 to 13), Dave Kutch (tracks: 3)
- Mixed by – Eric J. Dubowsky (tracks: 4, 6), Hotae Alexander Jang (tracks: 3), Jimmy Douglass (tracks: 1, 2, 5, 7 to 13), Salaam Remi (tracks: 1, 2, 5, 7 to 13), Matt Curtin (tracks: 4, 6; mixing assistance)
- Photography by – Philippe Bosse
- Producer – Andra Day (tracks: 3), Raphael Saadiq (tracks: 3), Salaam Remi (tracks: 1, 2, 5, 7 to 13), Warren Felder (tracks: 4, 6)
- Recorded by – Hotae Alexander Jang (tracks: 3), Ryan Evans (tracks: 1, 2, 5, 7 to 13), Downtown Trevor Brown (tracks: 4, 6), Warren Felder (tracks: 4, 6)
- Supervised by – Lynn Fainchtein

=== Recording ===
- Recorded at – Bay Eight
- Mixed at – The Magic Mix Room
- Mixed at – Instrument Zoo
- Mastered at – Sterling Sound
- Mastered at – The Mastering Palace

== Awards and nominations ==
Award	Date of ceremony	Category	Recipient(s)	Result	Ref.
Black Reel Awards	April 11, 2021	Outstanding Original Song	"Tigress & Tweed" – Andra Day & Raphael Saadiq	Nominated	
Critics' Choice Movie Awards	March 7, 2021	Best Song	"Tigress & Tweed" – Andra Day & Raphael Saadiq	Nominated	
Golden Globe Awards	February 28, 2021	Best Original Song	"Tigress & Tweed" – Andra Day & Raphael Saadiq	Nominated	
Grammy Awards	April 3, 2022	Best Compilation Soundtrack for Visual Media	The United States vs. Billie Holiday (Music from the Motion Picture)	Won	
Hollywood Music in Media Awards	January 27, 2021	Best Original Song in a Feature Film	"Tigress & Tweed" – Andra Day & Raphael Saadiq	Nominated	
Hollywood Music in Media Awards	January 27, 2021	Best Music Supervision – Film	Lynn Fainchtein	Nominated	
NAACP Image Awards	February 26, 2022	Outstanding Soundtrack/Compilation Album	The United States vs. Billie Holiday (Music from the Motion Picture) – Salaam Remi, Andra Day, Raphael Saadiq, Warren Felder	Nominated	
