= Andra Day =

American singer and actress (born 1984)

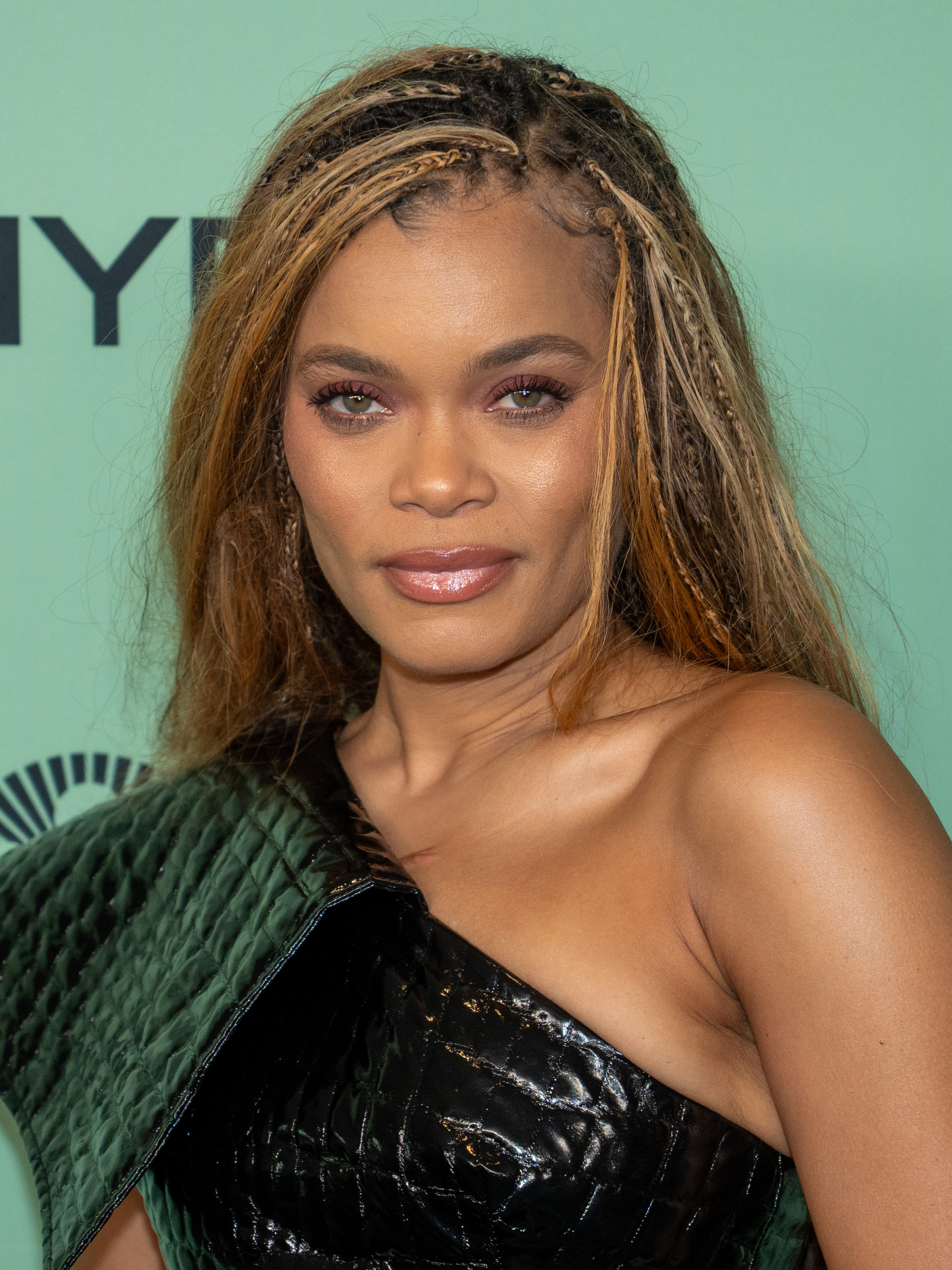
- Day at the 2025 New York Film Festival

Background information
- Born: Cassandra Monique Batie; December 30, 1984 (age 41); Edmonds, Washington, U.S.
- Origin: San Diego, California, U.S.
- Genres: R&B; soul; pop; blues
- Occupations: Singer; songwriter; actress
- Years active: 2012–present
- Labels: Warner; Buskin
- Website: andraday.com

Cassandra Monique Batie (born December 30, 1984), known professionally as Andra Day, is an American R&B singer, songwriter, and actress. She is the recipient of various accolades, including a Grammy Award, a Children's and Family Emmy Award, and a Golden Globe Award, along with a nomination for an Academy Award.

In 2015, she released her debut album, Cheers to the Fall. At the 2016 Grammy Awards, the album was nominated for Best R&B Album and the single, "Rise Up", was nominated for Best R&B Performance. To promote "Rise Up", she performed the song on The View, earning a Daytime Emmy Award nomination for the performance. Day also appeared alongside Stevie Wonder, who is partially credited for her discovery, in an ad for Apple TV in late 2015. In 2020, Day became one of the most-requested artists among Jazz Joy and Roy Global Radio listeners.

In 2021, Day made her acting debut with her portrayal of Billie Holiday in Lee Daniels' biopic The United States vs. Billie Holiday, winning the Golden Globe Award for Best Actress in a Motion Picture – Drama, and received a nomination for the Academy Award for Best Actress. Day received the Grammy Award for Best Compilation Soundtrack for Visual Media for the film's accompanying soundtrack.

== Early life and education ==
Day was born on December 30, 1984, in Edmonds, Washington. She moved to Southern California at age three, and grew up in Southeast San Diego, California, with her family. She began singing at a young age at the First United Methodist Church in Chula Vista, California. Day also began taking dance lessons at age 5 (a discipline she continued into her 20s). She attended Valencia Park Elementary School which she credits with fostering her interest in performing arts. At the age of 12, Day was introduced to the sounds of jazz vocalists such as Billie Holiday, Ella Fitzgerald, and Dinah Washington, all of whom she counts as early influences on her sound. Day attended the San Diego School of Creative and Performing Arts in Paradise Hills, where she graduated in 2003. On July 11, 2019, Day was inducted as an honorary member of Delta Sigma Theta sorority, a club in American colleges traditionally for Black women.

== Career ==
=== Music ===
After high school, Day worked about 20 different jobs, including one as a children's entertainer. In 2010, Stevie Wonder's then-wife, Kai Millard, noticed Day performing at a strip mall and brought her to the attention of her husband. Day received a call from Wonder himself soon after. No immediate partnership was formed, but the two reconnected around a year later. Wonder introduced Day to producer Adrian Gurvitz at that time. Gurvitz would eventually collaborate on Day's debut album a few years later.

Day was signed in 2011 to a development deal with Buskin Records founded by Jeffrey Evans, who Day asked to be her manager in 2013. Later Day & Buskin earned a record deal with Warner Bros. Records in part because of the popularity of her numerous unplugged covers and mashups on her YouTube channel, most of which were filmed in her sister's bedroom in San Diego. Her covers include Jessie J's "Mamma Knows Best", Eminem's "Lose Yourself", and Muse's "Uprising" among others. She was also known for mashups including one that patched together The Notorious B.I.G.'s "Big Poppa" with Marvin Gaye's "Let's Get It On" and another that combined Amy Winehouse's "He Can Only Hold Her" and Lauryn Hill's "Doo Wop (That Thing)".

During that time, Day was also working with Gurvitz on around 40 original songs. Other producers and contributors to what would eventually become her debut studio album included Raphael Saadiq, Questlove, James Poyser, DJ Jazzy Jeff, and The Dap-Kings. Day performed at the 2014 Sundance Film Festival and caught the eye of director, Spike Lee. He volunteered to direct the video for her single, "Forever Mine". Day has also performed at the 2015 BET Awards, the closing ceremonies of the 2015 Special Olympics, the Essence Music Festival, and on television shows like Jimmy Kimmel Live!, Good Morning America, and numerous others. She also performed Nina Simone's "Mississippi Goddam" for the soundtrack for the Netflix documentary, What Happened, Miss Simone?.

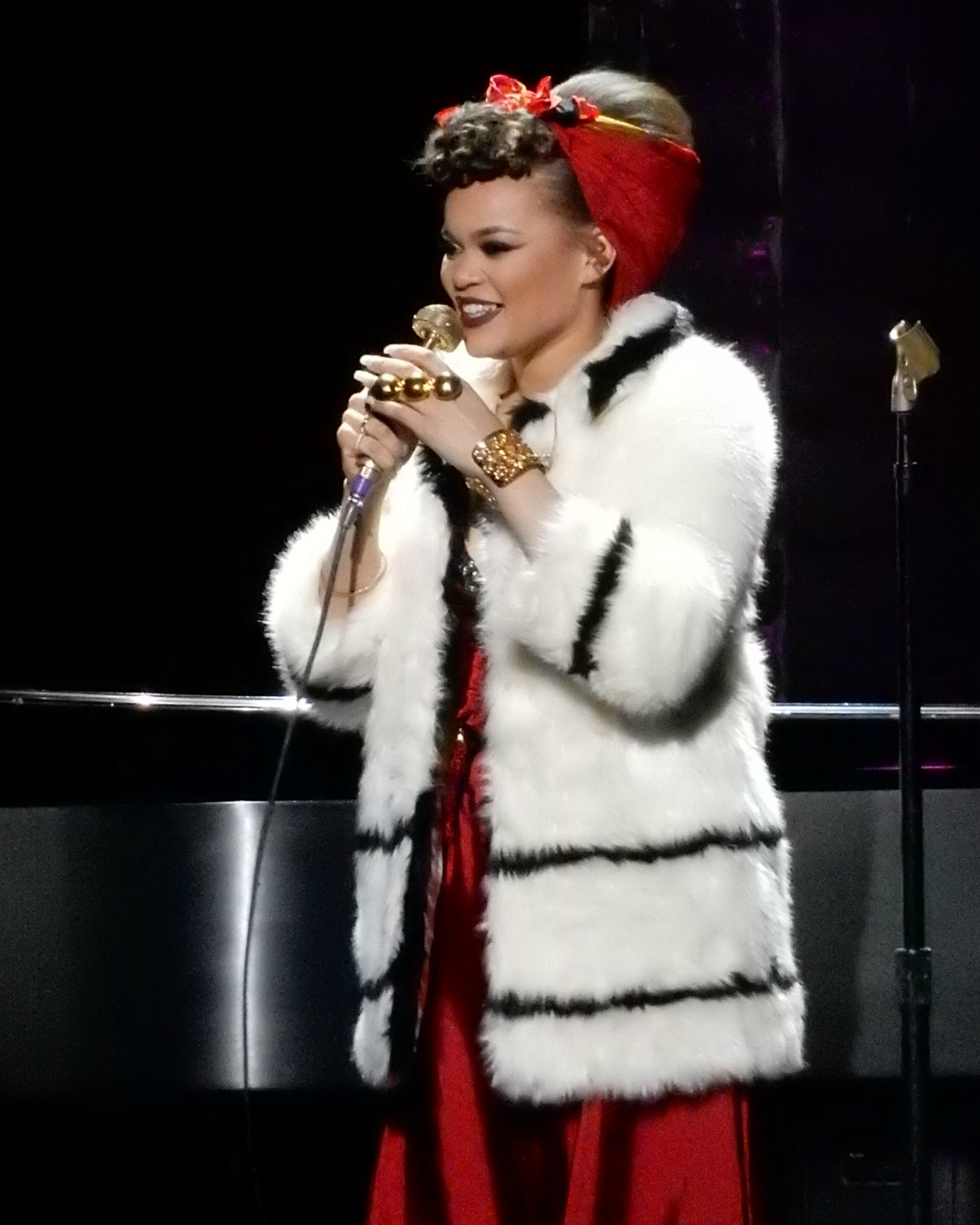
Andra Day performing at Radio City Music Hall in New York City, March 2016

Her first studio album, Cheers to the Fall, was released on August 28, 2015. It was met with critical acclaim with NPR's Katie Presley saying Day's voice has "Eartha Kitt's unflappable confidence, Amy Winehouse's effortless grasp of classic jazz, Billie Holiday's access to raw emotion and Adele's range and pop sensibility". The album was nominated for Best R&B Album and "Rise Up" was nominated for Best R&B Performance at the 58th Grammy Awards in 2016 (an event at which she also performed). The album also peaked at number 48 on the Billboard 200 list. In September 2015, "Rise Up" was used in an advertisement for Beats by Dre that featured tennis player Serena Williams. In November and December 2015, Day appeared alongside Stevie Wonder in an Apple TV commercial in which the two sang Wonder's song "Someday at Christmas".

Her first national tour took place in August and September 2015 when she opened for Lenny Kravitz. In October 2015, she sang "Rise Up" at The White House and again performed the song for A&E's live special, Shining a Light: A Concert for Progress on Race in America.

In May 2016, Day entered into an agreement with McDonald's and Coca-Cola that saw her image on around 50 million cups at McDonald's. The partnership was part of the "Share a Cup" lyrics program and featured lyrics from Day's "Rise Up". Purchasers of the cups at McDonald's could enter a sweepstakes that would have allowed them to see Day perform at the Essence Music Festival in June 2016. Her Cheers to the Fall Tour began in November 2016 in her hometown of San Diego. Day performed on the second day of the 2016 Democratic National Convention in Philadelphia to rousing applause. She followed immediately after a moving address by Mothers of the Movement, a group of black mothers who had lost a child through encounters with police and gun violence.

In December 2016, Andra Day received the Powerhouse Award at the Billboard Women in Music event. When asked what makes a 'powerhouse' powerful to others, Day responded, "I think you just remind them of their value, you remind them of their purpose. You remind them that you are not here just to exist, you're here to impact people in their lives...I think it just reinforces that."

In 2017, Day appeared on the song "Stand Up for Something" with rapper Common for the film Marshall. The single was nominated for the Academy Award for Best Original Song; Day and Common performed the song at the 90th Academy Awards in March 2018. Day performed with the Baltimore Children's Choir for the opening musical performance at the March for Our Lives rally in Washington, D.C., on March 24, 2018.

In 2024, Andra Day performed “Lift Every Voice and Sing” on the pregame show of Super Bowl LVIII. In August 2025 she collaborated on the track "Lean on My Love" featured on Jon Batiste's ninth studio album Big Money.

=== Acting ===
In her first major film role, Day starred as the iconic singer Billie Holiday in the biographical drama The United States vs. Billie Holiday, for which she won a Golden Globe for Best Actress – Drama, a BET Award for Best Actress and received her first Academy Award nomination for Best Actress. Day also composed and performed the soundtrack, which won the Grammy Award for Best Compilation Soundtrack for Visual Media. The original song "Tigress & Tweed" being nominated for Best Original Songs at the Golden Globe, Critics' Choice Movie Award and Black Reel award.

In 2021, Day was involved as writer and song performer on American educational television series We the People, winning the Children's and Family Emmy Awards for Outstanding Short Form Program. In 2022, it was announced that Day will be starring in the Lee Daniels' horror/thriller The Deliverance with Mo'Nique, Omar Epps, Aunjanue Ellis-Taylor and Glenn Close. In 2024, Day was announced to be portraying the Greek goddess Athena for the Disney+ series Percy Jackson and the Olympians. In 2025 she acted as on Bradley Cooper's directed film Is This Thing On?.

== Filmography ==
=== Film ===
| Year | Film | Role | Notes |
|---|---|---|---|
| 2017 | Marshall | Nightclub Singer | |
| 2017 | Cars 3 | Sweet Tea | Voice |
| 2021 | The United States vs. Billie Holiday | Billie Holiday | Nominated: Academy Award for Best Actress; Won: Golden Globe Award for Best Actress – Drama |
| 2024 | Exhibiting Forgiveness | Aisha | |
| 2024 | The Deliverance | Ebony Jackson | |
| 2025 | Is This Thing On? | Christine | |

=== Television ===
| Year | Film | Role | Notes |
|---|---|---|---|
| 2021 | We the People | Voice | Episode: "The Courts" |
| 2022 | RuPaul's Drag Race | Herself | Episode: "Moulin Ru: The Rusical" |
| 2024 | Bel Air | Herself | Episode: "Save the Best for Last" |
| 2025–present | Percy Jackson and the Olympians | Athena | Season 2 |

== Discography ==
- Cheers to the Fall (2015)
- The United States vs. Billie Holiday (soundtrack) (2021)
- CASSANDRA (cherith) (2024)

== Awards and nominations ==
Day has received three Grammy Award nominations for her R&B Album, Cheers to the Fall and her performance for "Rise Up" in 2016, and for Best Song Written for Visual Media for "Stand Up for Something" from Marshall. In 2018, she received a Daytime Emmy Award nomination for her live performance of "Rise Up" on The View. For the 2020 film The United States vs. Billie Holiday, at the Golden Globes, she received a nomination for Best Original Song for "Tigress and Tweed", and won Best Actress in a Motion Picture – Drama for her title performance as Billie Holiday. She also received a nomination for the Academy Award for Best Actress for the role.
