= Gary and Tony Have a Baby =

Promotional image

"Gary and Tony Have a Baby", also called In America: Gary and Tony Have a Baby, is a television film of the CNN. The documentary, anchored by Soledad O'Brien, follows Gary Spino and Tony Brown, a gay male couple, as they try to have a child through surrogacy. The program aired June 24, 2010.

== Reception ==
Tom Shales of The Washington Post praised "Gary and Tony", calling it "an intimate and affecting portrait of what happens when partners in a same-sex marriage set out to secure for themselves a blessed event, the limits of biology notwithstanding". LGBT-interest website AfterElton.com reviewer Michael Jensen echoed this accolade, applauding the show for focusing on the couples' relationship and their desire for a child and less on their gay activism. Jensen did question whether the episode should have explored the moral issues of surrogacy versus adoption more than it did.

The American Fertility Association awarded "Gary and Tony Have a Baby" with its 2010 "Illuminations NYC" Award for reflecting the AFA's "commitment to family building for all people, including the LGBT community".
