= Rise Up (Andra Day song) =

Single by Andra Day

from the album Cheers to the Fall
- Released: August 28, 2015
- Genre: Contemporary R&B
- Length: 4:13
- Label: Warner
- Songwriters: Andra Day; Jennifer Decilveo
- Producers: Adrian Gurvitz; Jennifer Decilveo

Andra Day singles chronology
"Forever Mine" (2015)	"Rise Up" (2015)	"Someday at Christmas" (2015)

Music video
- "Rise Up" on YouTube

"Rise Up" is a single by American singer and songwriter Andra Day. It was released on August 28, 2015, through Warner Music Group, as the second single from her debut studio album, Cheers to the Fall (2015).

The song is certified quadruple platinum in the US. It was nominated at the 58th Annual Grammy Awards for Best R&B Performance, and won The Ashford & Simpson Songwriter's Award at the Soul Train Music Awards. Her live performance on The View gave her a nomination at the 45th Daytime Emmy Awards.

== Composition ==
In an interview with Time, Andra Day explained that the song was written after one of her close friends had been diagnosed with cancer. She described it as a "a sort of prayer" during a "freestyle recording" where "there are lines in there I'd normally find cliché. But sometimes a good cliché is exactly what you need in a moment of hopelessness".

== Live performance ==
In July 2016 she performed the song at the Democratic National Convention. She also performed the song on talk show The View, receiving a Daytime Emmy Awards nomination for Outstanding Musical Performance in a Daytime Program.

== Music video ==
An official music video, directed by M. Night Shyamalan, was published on May 9, 2016, through the singer's YouTube channel.

== Reception ==
In an album review by Jim Carroll of The Irish Times praised the song for the signer's "grit and gumption as a writer". Isa Jaward of The Observer praised the "uplifting gospel melodies" of the song.

In 2018, the song was used in an episode of Doctor Who (Season 11, Episode 3, Titled "Rosa"). In this historical fiction episode, the Doctor and her companions must preserve the history of Rosa Parks refusal to give up her seat on the bus, in order to prevent a racist time traveler from making changes to prevent it from happening. The song is played during Rosa's arrest scene at the end, and also during the episode's end credits.

In 2021, the song became an anthem during Black Lives Matter protests. In 2024, the song would be used for a celebratory video for Cody Rhodes that was made after Rhodes won the Undisputed WWE Universal Championship, which was shown on the Raw after WrestleMania XL.

== Charts ==
Chart (2015–2017)	Peak position
France (SNEP)	115
UK Singles (Official Charts)	61
Canada AC (Billboard)	50
US Bubbling Under Hot 100 (Billboard)	1
US Adult R&B Songs (Billboard)	6
US Adult Pop Airplay (Billboard)	25
US Hot R&B/Hip-Hop Songs (Billboard)	31
US R&B/Hip-Hop Airplay (Billboard)	27

== Certifications ==
Region	Certification	Certified units/sales
Denmark (IFPI Danmark)	Gold	45,000^{‡}
United Kingdom (BPI)	Platinum	600,000^{‡}
United States (RIAA)	4× Platinum	4,000,000^{‡}
^{‡} Sales+streaming figures based on certification alone.
