= Matter of Fact with Soledad O'Brien =

American public affairs talk show

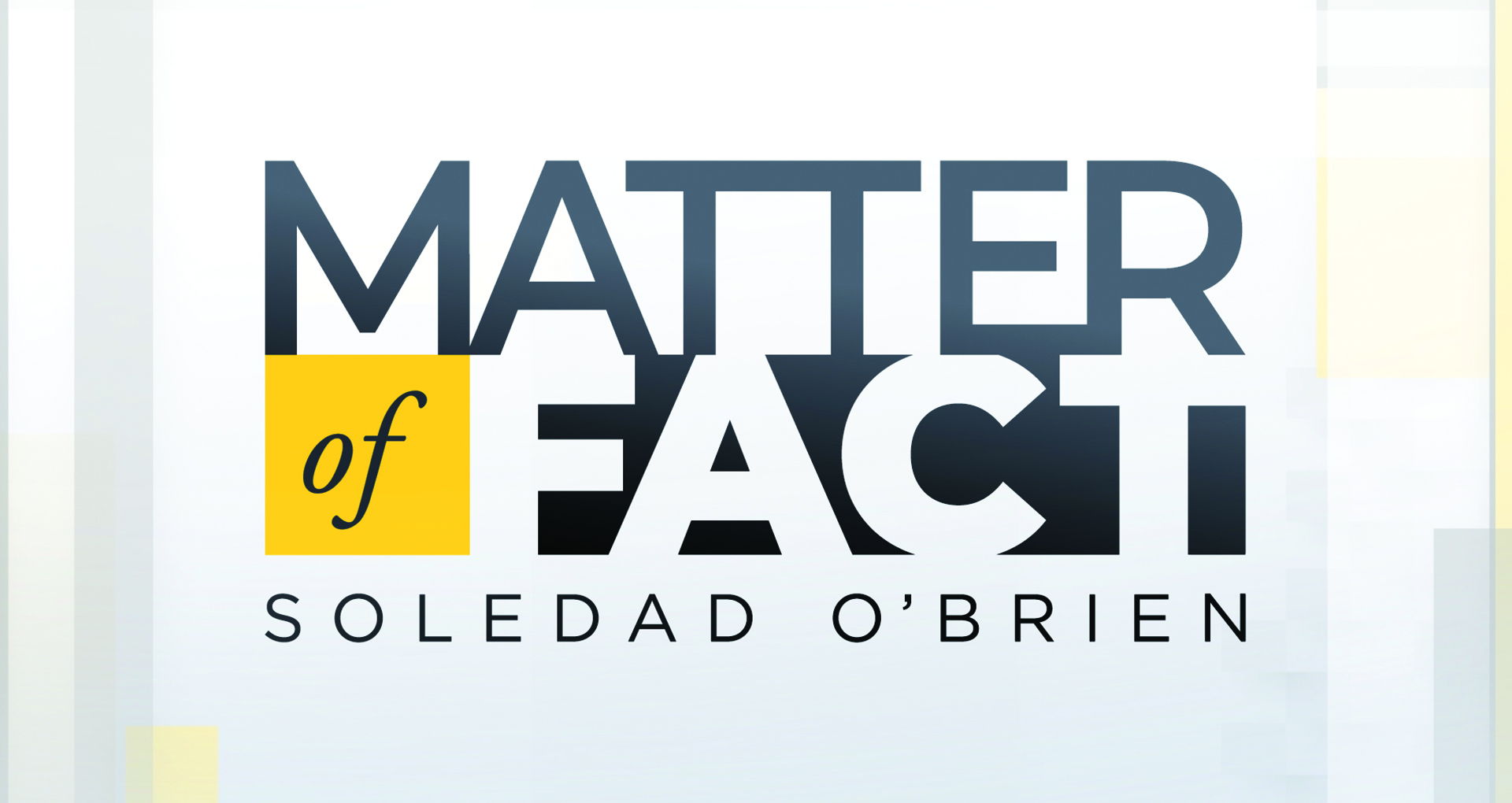
- Genre: Public affairs/Talk show
- Country of origin: United States
- Original language: English
- No. of seasons: 10

Production
- Production locations: Washington, D.C. and New York, N.Y.
- Running time: 22 minutes
- Production companies: Hearst Television (2015–2022); Hearst Media Production Group (2022–2025)

Original release
- Release: November 8, 2015 – August 23, 2025

Matter of Fact with Soledad O'Brien is an American public affairs television talk program hosted by journalist Soledad O'Brien which originally aired weekly from 2015 to 2025. The show was produced by Hearst Media Production Group and distributed to TV stations in national broadcast television syndication by Sony Pictures Television. It aired on TV stations nationwide in weekend program slots, primarily in the Sunday morning talk program block. It also aired on a one-week-after-broadcast basis on FYI.

Matter of Fact was originally launched in November 2015 and was hosted by entrepreneur and political commentator Fernando Espuelas. Beginning with the 2016-2017 TV season, O'Brien succeeded Espuelas in the hosting role.

A September 2017 Matter of Fact special, hosted by O'Brien, aired in prime-time on stations including WCVB-TV in Boston, WESH-TV in Orlando, and WTAE-TV in Pittsburgh, addressing the nationwide opioid-abuse crisis.

In April 2018, it was announced that the program had been renewed for the 2018-2019 TV season and that new agreements with multiple station groups had expanded the show's audience reach to 90% of U.S. TV households.

In January 2020, the show was recognized by the National Association of Television Program Executives (NATPE) with a NATPE Iris Award of Excellence.

In October 2020, O'Brien and the Matter of Fact producers launched a "listening tour" on race and justice with a 75-minute digital special, The Hard Truth About Bias: Images and Reality, which streamed across the digital platforms of many of Hearst's consumer media brands, including television stations, newspapers, various magazines and on Matter of Fact's website, YouTube and Facebook Live channels. This was followed in March 2021 with a 90-minute digital presentation, To Be An American: Identity, Race and Justice. Both productions featured guests from entertainment, journalism, and academia.

In January 2025, it was announced that the show was cancelled after 10 seasons.
