= Shining a Light: A Concert for Progress on Race in America =

2015 benefit concert

- Benefit concert by Various
- Date: November 21, 2015
- Duration: 2 hours

Shining a Light: A Concert for Progress on Race in America is a live benefit concert presented by A&E Networks and iHeartMedia, that aired on November 21, 2015 on six different television networks. The two-hour concert featured performances by Eric Church, Jamie Foxx, Sia, Rhiannon Giddens, Tori Kelly, John Legend, Miguel, Pink, Jill Scott, Ed Sheeran, Bruce Springsteen, Sting, Pharrell Williams, and Zac Brown Band.
