= Stand Up for Something =

"Stand Up For Something"

Single by Andra Day and Common

from the album Marshall
- Released: August 24, 2017
- Genre: Soul
- Length: 3:46
- Songwriters: Lonnie Lynn; Diane Warren
- Producer: Kyle Townsend

Andra Day singles chronology
"In the Room: Crusin" (2017)	"Stand Up For Something" (2017)	"Hard Love" (2017)

Common singles chronology
"Pyramids" (2016)	"Stand Up for Something" (2017)	"Her Love" (2019)

"Stand Up For Something" is a song written by Common and Diane Warren, performed by the former with singer Andra Day. The song was released as a lead single from the soundtrack album of 2017 film Marshall, and at the 90th Academy Awards received a nomination for Best Original Song.

Day and Common performed the song at the CMT Artists of the Year ceremony alongside Little Big Town, Lee Ann Womack and Danielle Bradbery. It was nominated for CMT Performance of the Year at the 2018 CMT Music Awards.

== Accolades ==
Award	Date of ceremony	Category	Result	Ref.
Academy Awards	March 4, 2018	Best Original Song	Nominated	
Black Reel Awards	February 22, 2018	Outstanding Original Song	Nominated	
CMT Music Awards	June 6, 2018	Performance of the Year	Nominated	
Critics' Choice Movie Awards	January 11, 2018	Best Song	Nominated	
Grammy Awards	January 28, 2018	Best Song Written for Visual Media	Nominated	
Hollywood Film Awards	November 5, 2017	Hollywood Song Award	Won	
Hollywood Music in Media Awards	November 17, 2017	Original Song — Feature Film	Won	
Satellite Awards	February 11, 2018	Best Original Song	Won	
