= The United States vs. Billie Holiday =

2021 film by Lee Daniels

- Release poster
- Directed by: Lee Daniels
- Screenplay by: Suzan-Lori Parks
- Based on: Chasing the Scream: The First and Last Days of the War on Drugs by Johann Hari
- Produced by: Lee Daniels; Jordan Fudge; Tucker Tooley; Joe Roth; Jeff Kirschenbaum; Pamela Oas Williams
- Starring: Andra Day; Trevante Rhodes; Garrett Hedlund; Leslie Jordan; Rob Morgan; Miss Lawrence; Da'Vine Joy Randolph; Adriane Lenox; Evan Ross; Natasha Lyonne; Tyler James Williams
- Cinematography: Andrew Dunn
- Edited by: Jay Rabinowitz
- Music by: Kris Bowers
- Production companies: Sierra/Affinity; New Slate Ventures; Roth/Kirschenbaum Films; Lee Daniels Entertainment
- Distributed by: Hulu
- Release date: February 26, 2021 (United States)
- Running time: 130 minutes
- Country: United States
- Language: English

The United States vs. Billie Holiday is a 2021 American biographical drama film about singer Billie Holiday. Directed by Lee Daniels, the film stars Andra Day in the title role, along with Trevante Rhodes, Garrett Hedlund, Leslie Jordan (in his final film appearance), Miss Lawrence, Adriane Lenox, Natasha Lyonne, Rob Morgan, Da'Vine Joy Randolph, Evan Ross, and Tyler James Williams. The screenplay by Suzan-Lori Parks is partly based on the 2015 book Chasing the Scream: The First and Last Days of the War on Drugs by Johann Hari.

Initially set to be released theatrically in the United States by Paramount Pictures, the film was sold to Hulu in December 2020 and digitally released in the United States on February 26, 2021. The United States vs. Billie Holiday received mixed reviews from critics; while Day's performance was praised, the direction and screenplay were criticized as unfocused. For her performance, Day was nominated for the Academy Award for Best Actress and won the Golden Globe Award for Best Actress in a Motion Picture – Drama. The film was also nominated for the Golden Globe Award for Best Original Song ("Tigress and Tweed") and the soundtrack won the Grammy Award for Best Compilation Soundtrack for Visual Media, for Andra Day, Salaam Remi, and Lynn Fainchtein.

== Plot ==
In 1957, Billie Holiday meets with a radio journalist, Reginald Lord Devine, for an interview. He asks her what it is like to be a "colored woman" and about the trouble she keeps getting into because of her hit song "Strange Fruit". Billie states that the lyrics are about human rights, something the government often forgets.

In 1947, Billie's husband Monroe and her manager, Joe Glaser, try to get Billie to cut "Strange Fruit" from her set list, fearing legal problems if they continue to perform something so controversial. Lester Young, Billie's sax player and longtime confidant, supports her in playing it.

In the 1940s, FBN chief Harry J. Anslinger declares Billie to be the top priority for his agents, as she is considered to be politically threatening due to the nature of her songs. Unable to arrest her for singing, they decide to go after her on drug charges. After Billie's next show, Agent Jimmy Fletcher, disguised as a soldier, witnesses her doing drugs. The FBI arrest Billie and her lover Joe Guy for drug use and possession. The judge sentences Billie to a year in jail after Guy, bribed by Anslinger, testifies against her.

Anslinger assigns Jimmy to visit Billie in prison, confident that he can get her to incriminate herself on further charges that will lead to a longer sentence. Instead, Jimmy (who has become convinced that Billie is being wrongfully persecuted) tells her to not trust anyone and keep her nose clean, lest the government find another way to destroy her.

After Billie is released from prison, she does a Carnegie Hall show, where she regretfully declines an audience member's request to sing "Strange Fruit". She is then introduced to promoter John Levy, who says he can pay off certain people to ensure she can keep performing. They begin a relationship, but when Levy is threatened with prosecution for allowing drug deals in his clubs, he betrays Billie by planting drugs on her person just as Anslinger's men burst in. In court, Fletcher admits under cross-examination that Billie was possibly framed, and she is freed. Anslinger again orders Fletcher to follow Billie on tour, pretending that he is leaving the Bureau.

In 1949, Jimmy comes to see Billie after a successful tour stop and reveals his deception. Suspicious, the whole crew has Jimmy do heroin to show he can be trusted. Over the course of the tour, Jimmy and Billie fall in love. One day, after the bus breaks down, Billie breaks up with Jimmy and sends him away, feeling that he deserves a nice girl, which she can never be. Jimmy then learns that Anslinger has fired him for using drugs on duty.

Billie marries Louis McKay, but eventually leaves him for Jimmy. In 1959, a now middle-aged Billie is dying in a hospital room from liver failure after decades of alcohol abuse. Anslinger visits her one last time, offering to erase her criminal record if she furnishes the names of other drug-using acquaintances. Billie mockingly replies that his grandkids will be singing "Strange Fruit" one day.

== Cast ==
- Andra Day as Billie Holiday
  - Taryn Brown as 10-year-old Billie
- Trevante Rhodes as Jimmy Fletcher
- Garrett Hedlund as Harry J. Anslinger
- Leslie Jordan as Reginald Lord Devine
- Miss Lawrence as Miss Freddy
- Adriane Lenox as Mrs. Fletcher
- Natasha Lyonne as Tallulah Bankhead
- Rob Morgan as Louis McKay
- Da'Vine Joy Randolph as Roslyn
- Evan Ross as Sam Williams
- Tyler James Williams as Lester Young
- Tone Bell as John Levy
- Blake DeLong as Agent Carter
- Randy Davison as Senator J. McCarthy
- Robert Alan Beuth as Congressman J. Rankin
- Kevin Hanchard as Louis Armstrong
- Dana Gourrier as Sadie Fagan
- Melvin Gregg as Joe Guy
- Erik LaRay Harvey as Jimmy Monroe
- Ray Shell as Carl the Drummer
- Furly Mac as James (Elevator Attendant)

== Production ==
Development on a new Billie Holiday biopic was announced in September 2019, with Lee Daniels directing. Andra Day was set to play the title role, with Trevante Rhodes, Garrett Hedlund and Natasha Lyonne also cast. Evan Ross, Dana Gourrier and Erik LaRay Harvey were also added later that month. Additional casting was announced in October. Daniels was hesitant to cast Day, owing to her limited acting experience, but became convinced after her acting coach sent him a clip of her performing.

Filming began on October 6, 2019, in Montreal.

Andra Day stated that she went through intensive preparation for her role; in addition to shedding over 40 pounds to match Billie's physique, she also had to smoke cigarettes and drink to develop a similar vocal tone and to get in the mindset of someone gripped by a lifetime of addiction.

== Release ==
The film was released on February 26, 2021. In July 2020, Paramount Pictures reportedly acquired distribution rights to the film in a bidding war at the Marché du Film which also included Focus Features, Sony Pictures and 101 Studios. It was originally scheduled to be released on February 12, 2021, but in November 2020, it was moved two weeks to February 26. Ultimately, in December 2020, Hulu acquired North American distribution rights to the film from New Slate Ventures; Paramount's deal for rights to the film apparently never closed despite the studio preparing advertisements and overseeing reshoots for it.

== Reception ==
=== Audience viewership ===
Hulu reported the film was the most-watched title over its first three days of release, with Samba TV estimating that 287,000 U.S. households watched the film.

=== Critical response ===
Review aggregator website Rotten Tomatoes reported that 55% of 185 critic reviews were positive, with an average rating of 5.4/10. The website's critics consensus reads, "Although The United States vs. Billie Holiday often falls shy of its subject's transcendence, Andra Day's performance offers brilliant compensation." On Metacritic the film has a weighted average score of 52 out of 100, based on 43 critics, indicating "mixed or average reviews".

David Rooney of The Hollywood Reporter wrote, "Day mesmerizes even when Lee Daniels' unwieldy bio-drama careens all over the map with stylistic inconsistency and narrative dysfunction, settling for episodic electricity in the absence of a robust connective thread. It's a mess, albeit an absorbing one, driven by a raw central performance of blistering indignation, both tough and vulnerable." Reviewing for Variety, Owen Gleiberman praised Day's performance and said, "In this sprawling, lacerating, but at times emotionally wayward biopic set during the last decade of Holiday's life, Day gives Billie a voice of pearly splendor that, over time, turns raspy and hard, and we see the same thing happening to Billie inside."

For Deadline Hollywood, Pete Hammond wrote, "You simply cannot say enough about what Day achieves in this role, particularly being a first-time actor. She gets beneath the skin of Holiday, giving a raw and honest portrait of an artist under duress but determined in her belief that she can use that art and talent to make the world a more just place." Peter Bradshaw of The Guardian gave the film 2 out of 5 stars, detailing, "Day's rendition is heartfelt. But the direction and storytelling are laborious, without the panache and incorrectness of earlier Daniels movies such as Precious (2009) and The Paperboy (2012). A cloud of solemnity and reverence hangs over it, briefly dispelled by the music itself." DiscussingFilm also praised Day in their 3/5 review, saying that her work is the only memorable aspect in an otherwise forgettable, muddled film.

Several jazz critics and musicians have had negative reactions to the film for its rewriting of history. Writing in JazzTimes, historian and musician Lewis Porter critiqued the ahistorical premise of the film:

In Lee Daniels' film The United States vs. Billie Holiday, the words "Earle Theater, Philadelphia, May 27, 1947” flash onscreen, and one sees a row of policemen, with Holiday's manager Joe Glaser standing at the center of them. Billie comes onstage and sings the first words of "Strange Fruit", solo. Immediately, Glaser orders the police, "Get her off that stage!" and they storm forward.

But wait! Holiday was not at the Earle Theater on that date. She never sang "Strange Fruit" as the first number in a set, and never sang that or anything else a cappella . . . Most significant, never in her entire career was Billie stopped while performing "Strange Fruit". Yes, the Federal Bureau of Narcotics pursued Holiday for her drug use. But there was no federal objection to the song "Strange Fruit", nor was there any campaign to suppress it.

If you believed this film—and so far as I can tell, almost everyone did, even the many critics who rightly panned it—you have been the victim of one of the worst instances of rewriting history in the annals of Hollywood. Even the usual spate of articles about "what's true in this based-on-fact movie" missed the boat. The Los Angeles Times stated that "[a]lthough some details of the relationships have been fictionalized ..., the ... conspiracies are well documented." Documented where exactly? In the movie, and nowhere else.

In their Jazz United podcast on WBGO, critic Nate Chinen and musician and radio host Greg Bryant, too, objected to the film's false premises, but also its let down to the jazz community for its inauthenticity and "exploitative nature", saying, for example "its the attempt to co-opt the name to sell films, what we have again what we have is the image of jazz, of black American music, whatever you call it, being used to promote certain stereotypes not only about the music, but the players, the people, who gave their lives to embody it."

=== Accolades ===
Award	Date of ceremony	Category	Recipient(s)	Result	Ref.
AARP's Movies for Grownups Awards	March 28, 2021	Best Movie for Grownups	The United States vs. Billie Holiday	Won	
AARP's Movies for Grownups Awards	March 28, 2021	Best Director	Lee Daniels	Nominated	
AARP's Movies for Grownups Awards	March 28, 2021	Best Time Capsule	The United States vs. Billie Holiday	Nominated	
Academy Awards	April 25, 2021	Best Actress	Andra Day	Nominated	
African-American Film Critics Association Awards	April 7, 2021	Best Picture	The United States vs. Billie Holiday	Nominated	
African-American Film Critics Association Awards	April 7, 2021	Best Actress	Andra Day	Won	
BET Awards	June 27, 2021	Best Movie	The United States vs. Billie Holiday	Nominated	
BET Awards	June 27, 2021	Best Actress	Andra Day	Won	
Black Reel Awards	April 11, 2021	Outstanding Actress	Andra Day	Nominated	
Black Reel Awards	April 11, 2021	Outstanding Breakthrough Performance, Female	Andra Day	Won	
Black Reel Awards	April 11, 2021	Outstanding Costume Design	Paolo Nieddu	Nominated	
Black Reel Awards	April 11, 2021	Outstanding Original Song	"Tigress & Tweed" – Andra Day & Raphael Saadiq	Nominated	
Critics' Choice Movie Awards	March 7, 2021	Best Actress	Andra Day	Nominated	
Critics' Choice Movie Awards	March 7, 2021	Best Hair and Makeup	The United States vs. Billie Holiday	Nominated	
Critics' Choice Movie Awards	March 7, 2021	Best Song	"Tigress & Tweed" – Andra Day & Raphael Saadiq	Nominated	
Dallas–Fort Worth Film Critics Association Awards	February 10, 2021	Best Actress	Andra Day	5th Place	
Golden Globe Awards	February 28, 2021	Best Actress in a Motion Picture – Drama	Andra Day	Won	
Golden Globe Awards	February 28, 2021	Best Original Song	"Tigress & Tweed" – Andra Day & Raphael Saadiq	Nominated	
Grammy Awards	April 3, 2022	Best Compilation Soundtrack for Visual Media	The United States vs. Billie Holiday	Won	
Hollywood Music in Media Awards	January 27, 2021	Best Original Song in a Feature Film	"Tigress & Tweed" – Andra Day & Raphael Saadiq	Nominated	
Hollywood Music in Media Awards	January 27, 2021	Best Music Supervision – Film	Lynn Fainchtein	Nominated	
Make-Up Artists and Hair Stylists Guild Awards	April 3, 2021	Best Special Make-Up Effects in a Feature-Length Motion Picture	Adrien Morot	Nominated	
NAACP Image Awards	February 26, 2022	Outstanding Motion Picture	The United States vs. Billie Holiday	Nominated	
NAACP Image Awards	February 26, 2022	Outstanding Actress in a Motion Picture	Andra Day	Nominated	
NAACP Image Awards	February 26, 2022	Outstanding Soundtrack/Compilation Album	The United States vs. Billie Holiday Soundtrack (Salaam Remi, Andra Day, Raphael Saadiq, Warren Felder)	Nominated	
Palm Springs International Film Festival	February 11, 2021	Breakthrough Performance Award	Andra Day	Won	
Women Film Critics Circle Awards	March 7, 2021	Best Woman Storyteller	Suzan-Lori Parks	Nominated	
Women Film Critics Circle Awards	March 7, 2021	Best Actress	Andra Day	Nominated	
Women Film Critics Circle Awards	March 7, 2021	Karen Morley Award	The United States vs. Billie Holiday	Won	

== See also ==
- Lady Sings the Blues – A 1972 biopic of Billie Holiday, starring Diana Ross.
- Lady Day at Emerson's Bar and Grill – A 1986 play and 2016 television movie, starring Audra McDonald.
- Federal drug policy of the United States
