= Cheers to the Fall =

2015 debut studio album by Andra Day

Studio album by Andra Day
- Released: August 28, 2015
- Genre: R&B
- Length: 49:52
- Label: Warner Bros.
- Producers: Jenn Decilveo; Adrian Gurvitz; Rob Kleiner; Raphael Saadiq; Chris Seefried

Andra Day chronology
Cheers to the Fall (2015)	Merry Christmas from Andra Day (2016)

Singles from Cheers to the Fall
- 1. "Forever Mine" Released: 2015; 2. "Rise Up" Released: August 28, 2015; 3. "Gold" Released: 2016

Cheers to the Fall is the debut studio album by American singer Andra Day. It was released on August 28, 2015, by Warner Bros. Records and Buskin Records. She worked with Jenn Decilveo, Adrian Gurvitz, Rob Kleiner, Raphael Saadiq, and Chris Seefried in the production of this album.

The album was nominated for Best R&B Album at the 58th Annual Grammy Awards, while the second single "Rise Up" was nominated for Best R&B Performance; the song won The Ashford & Simpson Songwriter's Award at the Soul Train Music Awards, while her live performance on The View received a nomination at the 45th Daytime Emmy Awards.

== Conception ==
The album's tracks were entirely co-written by Day with Adrian Gurvitz, Rob Kleiner, Raphael Saadiq, Jennifer Decilveo, Pixie Lott and Chris Seefried, which expresses ""a biography in the form of soul music, [about] truth, fearlessness, vulnerability, forgiveness and love."

== Critical reception ==
Professional ratings
Review scores
Source	Rating
AllMusic	4/5 stars
Billboard	3.5/5 stars
The Guardian	2/5 stars
The Irish Times	3/5 stars
The Observer	3/5 stars

At Album of the Year, which assigns a normalized rating out of 100 to reviews from mainstream publications, the album received an average score of 63 based on 4 reviews. Awarding the album four stars at AllMusic, Andy Kellman states, "almost every selection has a distinguishing detail or two, whether it's a sly nod to a classic hip-hop artist, an unexpected place Day takes her dynamic voice, or some clever expression of heartache." Steven J. Horowitz, giving the album three and a half stars for Billboard, writes, "she shouldn't be dismissed as a carbon copy [of Amy Winehouse] – the LP, inspired by an eight-year relationship's end, is too genuinely intentioned and rife with regret. It's hard not to sympathize when she bemoans". Reviewing the album from The Boston Globe, Ken Capobianco describes, "This confident, stylish pop R&B record ushers in a sophisticated vocalist who faithfully reflects past influences while remaining contemporary and relevant." Camille Augustin, who pens a review of the album for Vibe, says, "The beauty in Andra's art is that the message applies to all. All we need to do is listen."

== Track listing ==
No.	Title	Writer(s)	Length
1.	"Forever Mine"	Cassandra Batie; Rob Kleiner	3:19
2.	"Only Love"	Batie; Adrian Gurvitz	3:24
3.	"Gold"	Batie; Chris Seefried	3:45
4.	"Not Today"	Batie; A. Gurvitz	3:53
5.	"Mistakes"	Batie; A. Gurvitz	3:34
6.	"Goodbye Goodnight"	Batie; Kleiner; Seefried	4:26
7.	"Rearview"	Batie; A. Gurvitz	4:04
8.	"Red Flags"	Batie; A. Gurvitz	3:47
9.	"Honey or Fire"	Batie; A. Gurvitz	3:17
10.	"Gin & Juice (Let Go My Hand)"	Batie; Raphael Saadiq	3:31
11.	"Rise Up"	Batie; Jennifer Decilveo	4:13
12.	"City Burns"	Batie; A. Gurvitz; Elaine Gurvitz; Victoria Lott; Marthony "Mark" Tabb	4:53
13.	"Cheers to the Fall"	Batie; A. Gurvitz	3:46
Total length:			49:52

== Personnel ==
Credits adapted from AllMusic.

Musicians

- Billy Adamson – guitar
- Victor Axelrod – piano
- Kala Balch – background vocals
- Nick Barr – cello, viola
- Lemar Carter – drums
- Matt Chamberlain – drums
- Errol Cooney – guitar
- Rosie Danvers – cello, string arrangements
- Andra Day – lead vocals, background vocals
- Joe Crispiano – guitar
- Chris "Daddy" Dave – drums
- Kylie Davies – double bass
- Jenn Decilveo – bass
- DJ Jazzy Jeff – scratching
- Alison Dods – violin
- Lisa Dondlinger – violin
- Sean Erick – horn
- Jonathan Flaugher – bass
- Elizabeth Frascoia – trombone
- Cochemea Gastelum – baritone saxophone
- Adrian Gurvitz – drums, harmonica, piano, strings, vocals
- David Guy – trumpet
- Missi Hale – background vocals
- Sally Jackson – violin
- Bryony James – cello
- Chris Johnson – drums
- Charles Jones – organ, piano
- Patrick Kiernan – violin
- Rob Kleiner – bass, guitar, percussion, piano
- Keri Larson – background vocals
- Mika Lett – background vocals
- Timothy Loo – cello
- Jordan McLean – trumpet
- Leon Michels – saxophone
- Miles Mosley – bass
- David Paich – piano
- Pino Palladino – bass
- Dean Parks – guitar
- Jimmy Paxson – drums
- Kerenza Peacock – violin
- Hayley Pomfrett – violin
- Questlove – drums
- Zac Rae – piano
- Peter Randall – bass
- Raphael Saadiq – bass, drums, guitar, percussion
- Jenny Sacha – violin
- Bridget Sarai – background vocals
- Chris Seefried – guitar, Moog synthesizer, piano
- Sarah Sexton – violin
- Gus Seyffert – bass
- Onitsha Shaw – background vocals
- Leon Silva – horn
- Josh Smith – guitar
- Homer Steinweiss – drums
- Neal Sugarman – saxophone
- Calvin Turner – bass
- Fernando Velez – percussion
- Carl Wheeler – organ
- Bruce White – cello, viola
- Deborah Widdup – violin
- Kevin Williams – horn
- The Wired Strings – strings
- Dave Wood – guitar

Technical personnel

- Keith Armstrong – assistant
- Ryan Benton – A&R
- Tom Bilier – engineering
- Gerry "The Gov" Brown – mixing
- Bobby Campbell – mixing
- Adam Chagnon – mixing engineer
- Jon Chen – A&R
- Steve Churchyard – engineering
- Irie Cooper – mixing assistant
- Andra Day – executive production
- Jenn Decilveo – production, additional production
- Jeffrey Evans – executive production
- Jeff Fenster – A&R
- Michael Frondelli – engineering
- Brian "Big Bass" Gardner – mastering
- Adrian Gurvitz – executive production, production, additional production, engineering, programming
- Seth Atkins Horan – engineering
- Hotae Alexander Jang – mixing assistant
- Ben Kane – engineering
- Nik Karpen – assistant
- Rob Kleiner – production, vocal production, engineering, programming
- Chris Lord-Alge – mixing
- Tony Maserati – mixing
- Dan McCarroll – A&R
- James Poyser – additional production
- Alex Reid – programming
- Gabriel Roth – engineering
- Steve Rusch – mixing, engineering
- Raphael Saadiq – production
- Myriam Santos – creative direction, photography
- Andrew Schubert – mixing engineer
- Tyler Scott – mixing engineer
- Chris Seefried – production, vocal production, programming
- Ken Sluiter – engineering, second engineer
- Nick Taylor – engineering, string engineering
- Jonna Terrasi – A&R
- Stephen Walker – art direction
- Matt "Wiggy" Wiggers – mixing engineer

== In other media ==
Day's song "Rise Up" has been used in numerous media:

- Serena Williams Beats ad campaign. (2015)
- The tenth and final episode in the Netflix series The Five (2016)
- The twenty-second episode "Mama Tried" in season 12 of the medical drama, Grey's Anatomy (2016)
- A trailer for the 2016 film The Birth of a Nation
- Hillary Clinton presidential campaign, 2016 as a theme song at campaigns and rallies.
- A trailer for the 2017 film Stronger.
- The ABC docudrama miniseries When We Rise, which chronicled the LGBT rights movement in America.
- During NBA player Paul Pierce's jersey number retirement ceremony with the Boston Celtics (2018)
- The episode "Rosa", in the science fiction television series Doctor Who (2018)
- The series finale of Big Brother UK (2018)
- The episode "Athena Begins" of 9-1-1 (2019)
- The end credits of "Me as Well" of Orange Is the New Black (2019)
- Sung at the end of the Disney+ movie Godmothered (2020)
- In Vodafone's Christmas advert campaign (2020)
- Performed by Alex Newell (as Mo) in the first episode "Zoey's Extraordinary Return" in season 2 of the musical comedy-drama Zoey's Extraordinary Playlist (2021)

"Rise Up" has frequently been covered on television talent shows around the world including:

- America's Got Talent: Angelica Hale
- American Idol: Just Sam (Season 18)
- Britain's Got Talent: Sarah Ikumu (Season 11) and The B-Positive Choir (Season 12)
- The X Factor UK: Caitlyn Vanbeck & group performance. Kelsea Johnson (Season 14)
- The Voice: Esera Tuaolo (Season 13), Aaliyah Rose (Season 12), Lauren Diaz (Season 11) and Tamar Davis (Season 10)
- Queen of the Universe: Grag Queen (Season 1)
- Shulem Lemmer, the Hasidic Jewish icon, and the first Haredi Jew to sign with a major record label, released his own cover version as a single in 2020.

== Live performances ==
In 2016 Day performed "Rearview" at the 2016 ESPY Awards during the In Memoriam tribute. In 2021, Day performed "Rise Up (Andra Day)" during the virtual inaugural parade, commemorating the Inauguration of Joe Biden as the 46th President of the United States and again performed the song at the opening ceremony of Expo 2020 in Dubai, UAE on September 30, 2021.

== Chart performance ==
=== Weekly charts ===
Chart (2015–2016)	Peak position
Swiss Albums (Schweizer Hitparade)	69
US Billboard 200	48
US Top R&B/Hip-Hop Albums (Billboard)	6

=== Year-end charts ===
Chart (2016)	Position
US Top R&B/Hip-Hop Albums (Billboard)	37

== Certifications ==
Region	Certification	Certified units/sales
United States (RIAA)	Gold	500,000^{‡}
^{‡} Sales+streaming figures based on certification alone.
